= Children's Christmas Parade =

Coordinates: 33°47′26.3″N 84°23′6.5″W

The Children's Christmas Parade logo

The Children's Christmas Parade was a major Christmas parade held to benefit Children's Healthcare of Atlanta. The parade started in 1981 as the Egleston Christmas Parade. It became the Children's Christmas Parade, following the 1998 merger of Egleston Children’s Hospital and Scottish Rite Children's Hospital. The Children's Christmas Parade was held on the first Saturday in December.

Nielsen estimates of TV viewing audience and crowd attendance together exceeded 500,000 in 2011.

The parade featured floats, giant helium-filled balloons and marching bands. It was the largest holiday parade in the Southeast.

The Children's Christmas Parade aired live from 10:30 AM EST until noon on WSB-TV 2.1 in HDTV, previously after a half-hour pre-show (until 2010) about the children at the hospital. It was re-run again on Christmas Day.

Parade sponsors included Wells Fargo, Macy's, Geico, Coca-Cola, SunTrust, Fidelity Bank, Georgia's Own Credit Union, Aarons, Publix, KidsRKids, Ringling Bros, Atlanta Peach Movers, Foresters Insurance, and Southwest Airlines. In its earliest years, it was sponsored by Davison's, one of the three major regional department stores based in Atlanta until they were eliminated by Macy's.

The COVID-19 pandemic prompted organizers to cancel the parade in 2020. WSB-TV instead aired a special program, looking back at 40 years of Children's Christmas Parade memories.

Children's Healthcare of Atlanta announced they would be ending the parade in 2021. A new event called, "Children's Season on the Square," will replace the parade and feature a Christmas tree lighting at Colony Square in Midtown Atlanta.

== Parade route ==
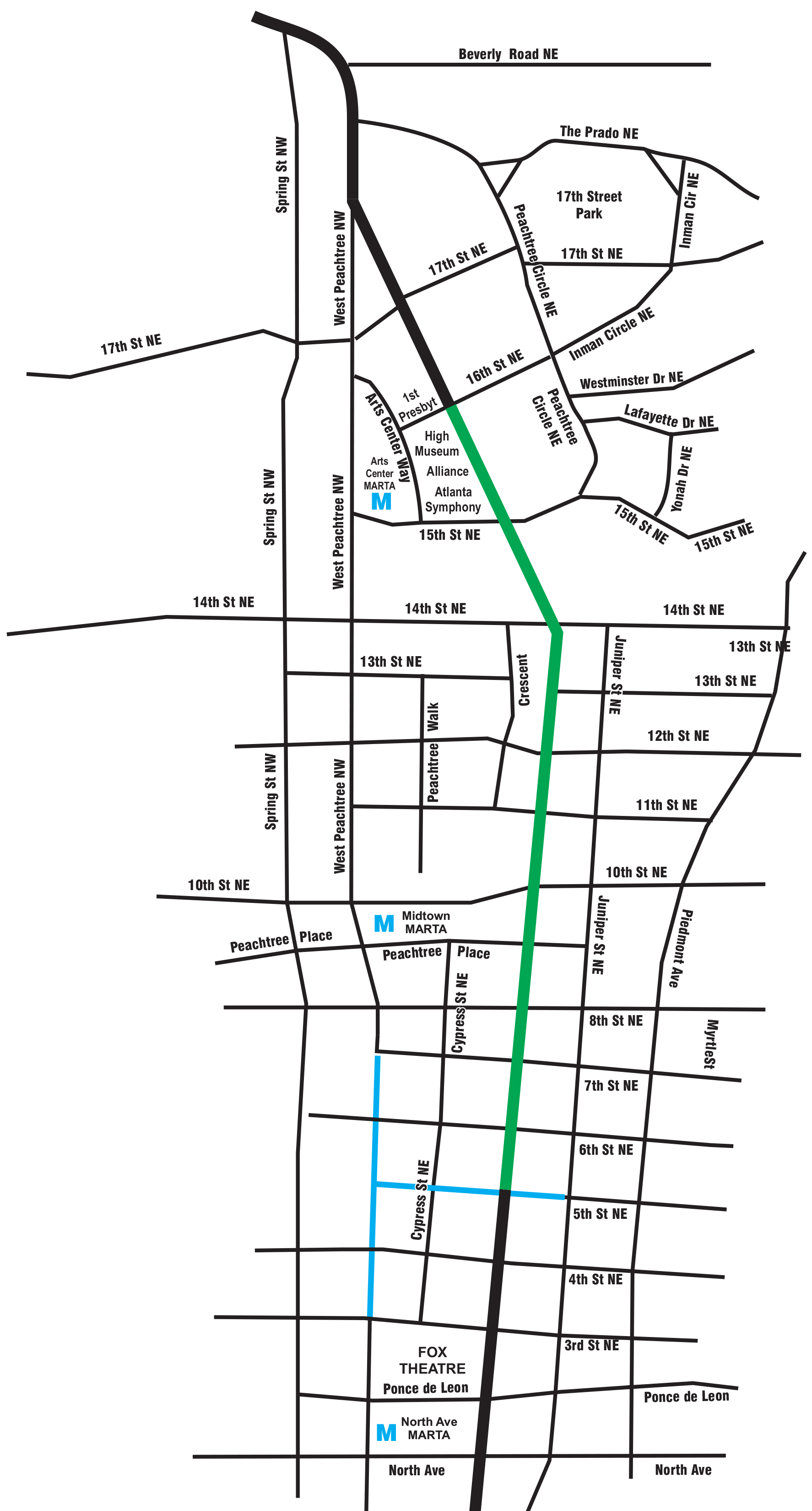
2013 Children's Christmas Parade route

For much of the parade's history, it began at Peachtree Street near Baker Street in downtown Atlanta. The 1.5-mile (2.4 km) route followed Atlanta's famed Peachtree Street southward before turning right onto Marietta Street at Five Points. The parade then turned left ending near the entrance to Centennial Olympic Park. This route took it by the 1927 Davison's (later overtaken by Macy's) building at 200 Peachtree.

In 2013, organizers announced the Children's Christmas Parade would be moving from downtown to Midtown to make way for construction of the new Atlanta Streetcar. The new parade route (shown left) started at Peachtree Street and 16th Street, in front of the High Museum of Art, and continued for 1.0 mile (1.6 km), before ending at Peachtree Street and 5th Street.

== Festival of Trees ==
The parade also served as the opening event for the nine-day Festival of Trees, also benefiting CHoA, and originally held at the Georgia World Congress Center. Even though the Festival of Trees left its longtime home in 2007, the Children's Christmas Parade remained in downtown Atlanta continuing a nearly three-decade Atlanta tradition. The festival, which started in 1979, was canceled in 2009, after having been drastically reduced in previous years. In 2008, the "festival" was a gala hosted by the Savannah College of Art and Design satellite campus in Atlanta.
