= Scottish Rite Hospital =

Scottish Rite Hospital may refer to:

- CHOA Scottish Rite Hospital, Atlanta, Georgia, United States
- Texas Scottish Rite Hospital for Children, Dallas, Texas, United States

== See also ==
- Scottish Rite Cathedral (disambiguation)
