= Scottish Rite Cathedral =

Scottish Rite Cathedral and Scottish Rite Temple are names commonly applied to buildings used by Ancient and Accepted Scottish Rite, a body associated with Freemasonry. It may refer to any of a number of specific buildings, including:

== United States ==
(alphabetical by state then town or city)

- The Temple Downtown, listed on the National Register of Historic Places (NRHP) as Scottish Rite Temple, in Mobile County, Alabama
- Scottish Rite Cathedral (Tucson, Arizona), listed on the NRHP in Pima County, Arizona
- Scottish Rite Cathedral (Long Beach, California), Long Beach Historic Landmark
- Scottish Rite Masonic Temple (Los Angeles), California
- Scottish Rite Cathedral (Pasadena, California), deemed NRHP-eligible but not listed
- Scottish Rite Masonic Center (San Francisco, California)
- Scottish Rite Cathedral (Peoria, Illinois)
- Scottish Rite Cathedral (Indianapolis, Indiana), listed on the NRHP in Marion County, Indiana
- Scottish Rite Consistory Building, Des Moines, Iowa, listed on the NRHP in Polk County, Iowa
- Scottish Rite Temple (Kansas City, Kansas), listed on the NRHP in Wyandotte County, Kansas
- Scottish Rite Temple (Wichita, Kansas), listed on the NRHP in Sedgwick County, Kansas
- Ancient and Accepted Scottish Rite Temple, Louisville, KY, listed on the NRHP in Jefferson County, Kentucky
- Scottish Rite Cathedral (Shreveport, Louisiana), listed on the NRHP in Caddo Parish, Louisiana
- Scottish Rite Temple (Minneapolis, Minnesota)
- Scottish Rite Cathedral (Joplin, Missouri), listed on the NRHP in Jasper County, Missouri
- Scottish Rite Temple (Lincoln, Nebraska), listed on the NRHP in Lancaster County, Nebraska
- Scottish Rite Cathedral (Omaha, Nebraska), now known as the Omaha Scottish Rite Masonic Center, listed on the NRHP in Douglas County, Nebraska
- Scottish Rite Temple (Santa Fe, New Mexico), listed on the NRHP in Santa Fe County, New Mexico
- Scottish Rite Temple (Guthrie, Oklahoma), listed on the NRHP in Logan County, Oklahoma
- McAlester Scottish Rite Temple (McAlester, Oklahoma), listed on the NRHP in Pittsburg County, Oklahoma
- Scottish Rite Cathedral (Harrisburg, Pennsylvania)
- Scottish Rite Cathedral (New Castle, Pennsylvania), listed on the NRHP in Lawrence County, Pennsylvania
- Masonic Temple and Scottish Rite Cathedral, Scranton, PA, now known as the Scranton Cultural Center and listed on the NRHP in Lackawanna County, Pennsylvania
- Dallas Scottish Rite Temple (Dallas, Texas), listed on the NRHP in Dallas County, Texas
- Scottish Rite Cathedral (Galveston, Texas), listed on the NRHP in Galveston County, Texas
- Scottish Rite Cathedral (San Antonio, Texas), listed on the NRHP in Bexar County, Texas

== See also ==
- Scottish Rite Dormitory, Austin, Texas, listed on the NRHP in Texas
- Scottish Rite Hospital for Crippled Children, Decatur, Georgia, listed on the NRHP in Georgia
- Texas Scottish Rite Hospital for Children, Dallas, Texas
- House of the Temple in Washington, D.C.
