= Children's Healthcare of Atlanta at Hughes Spalding =

Children's at Hughes Spalding
- Children's Healthcare of Atlanta, Grady Health System

Geography
- Location: Atlanta, Georgia, United States
- Coordinates: 33.7536°N 84.3821°W

Organization
- Type: General
- Affiliated university: Emory University School of Medicine, Morehouse School of Medicine
- Network: Children's Healthcare of Atlanta

Services
- Beds: 24

History
- Founded: 1952

Links
- Website: http://www.choa.org
- Lists: Hospitals in the United States

The Children's Healthcare of Atlanta - Hughes Spalding Children's Hospital is a freestanding, 24-bed, pediatric acute care and outpatient children's hospital located in downtown Atlanta, Georgia. It is affiliated with both the Emory University School of Medicine and the Morehouse School of Medicine, and is a member of the Children's Healthcare of Atlanta system, 1 of 3 of the children's hospitals in the system. The hospital provides comprehensive pediatric specialties and subspecialties to infants, children, teens, and young adults age 0–21 throughout the Atlanta region.

In 2022, Hughes Spalding hospital managed 88,178 patient visits and 55,982 Emergency Department visits.

== History ==
The Hughes Spalding Pavilion opened as a private hospital that served African-American patients beginning in 1952, but plans for the hospital began in the late 1940s. As World War II ended, it became apparent that African Americans in Atlanta did not have sufficient healthcare options. In comparison to white Atlanta residents, Black Atlanta residents had a higher mortality rate and limited access to medical professionals and healthcare facilities. Prominent Atlanta businessman and attorney Hughes Spalding recognized the need for a hospital to serve the Black population and led a movement to change these inadequacies.

Spalding’s desire to help was initially sparked in 1946 when Margaret Mitchell, famed author of the Pulitzer Prize-winning novel Gone With the Wind, wrote to him to express her concern about the healthcare system available to African Americans in Atlanta. She had experienced its shortcomings firsthand when her longtime laundress, an African-American woman, neared the final days of her life after a battle with cancer and Mitchell was unable to find a suitable hospital facility for her. Also included in her letter to Spalding was a donation to help address this problem and fund a better medical facility in Atlanta for African Americans. Inspired by Mitchell’s letter and donation, Spalding then looked to other leaders in Atlanta to raise money to build this new facility. Spalding suggested the hospital be named in Mitchell’s honor, but Atlanta community leaders decided to name it after him instead in recognition of his efforts.

In May 1947, the Fulton-DeKalb Hospital Authority, led by Hughes Spalding, authorized construction to begin on the hospital. Emory University donated 3 acres of land across from Grady Hospital in downtown Atlanta for the new facility, which would be operated through the Grady Health System. The hospital continues to operate at this original location today. When it finally opened in 1952, the Hughes Spalding Pavilion held more than 130 beds and provided medical care for African American adults and children. The hospital also provided medical training for African Americans in the workforce.

In 1983, Hughes Spalding Pavilion expanded its facilities. Along with this expansion, the hospital began to specialize in pediatric care. Along with this expansion, the hospital began to specialize in pediatric care. The hospital was briefly closed from 1989 to 1991 and then reopened in 1992 as Hughes Spalding Children’s Hospital.

In 2004, Children's Healthcare of Atlanta and Grady Health System jointly announced plans for Children’s to provide pediatric services at Hughes Spalding. These plans became a reality in 2006 when Children’s assumed management of the hospital. The 2006 merger was facilitated by a $20 million donation by philanthropist Diana Blank.

In 2010, a new building for the hospital opened at the same location, providing expanded facilities, updated equipment, a primary care center, a sickle cell clinic and an asthma clinic.

== See also ==
- Grace Towns Hamilton
- Children's Healthcare of Atlanta
- List of children's hospitals in the United States
- Arthur M. Blank Hospital
- Scottish Rite Medical Center
- Egleston Hospital
