= Davison's =

American department store chain

Coordinates: 33°45′32″N 84°23′17″W

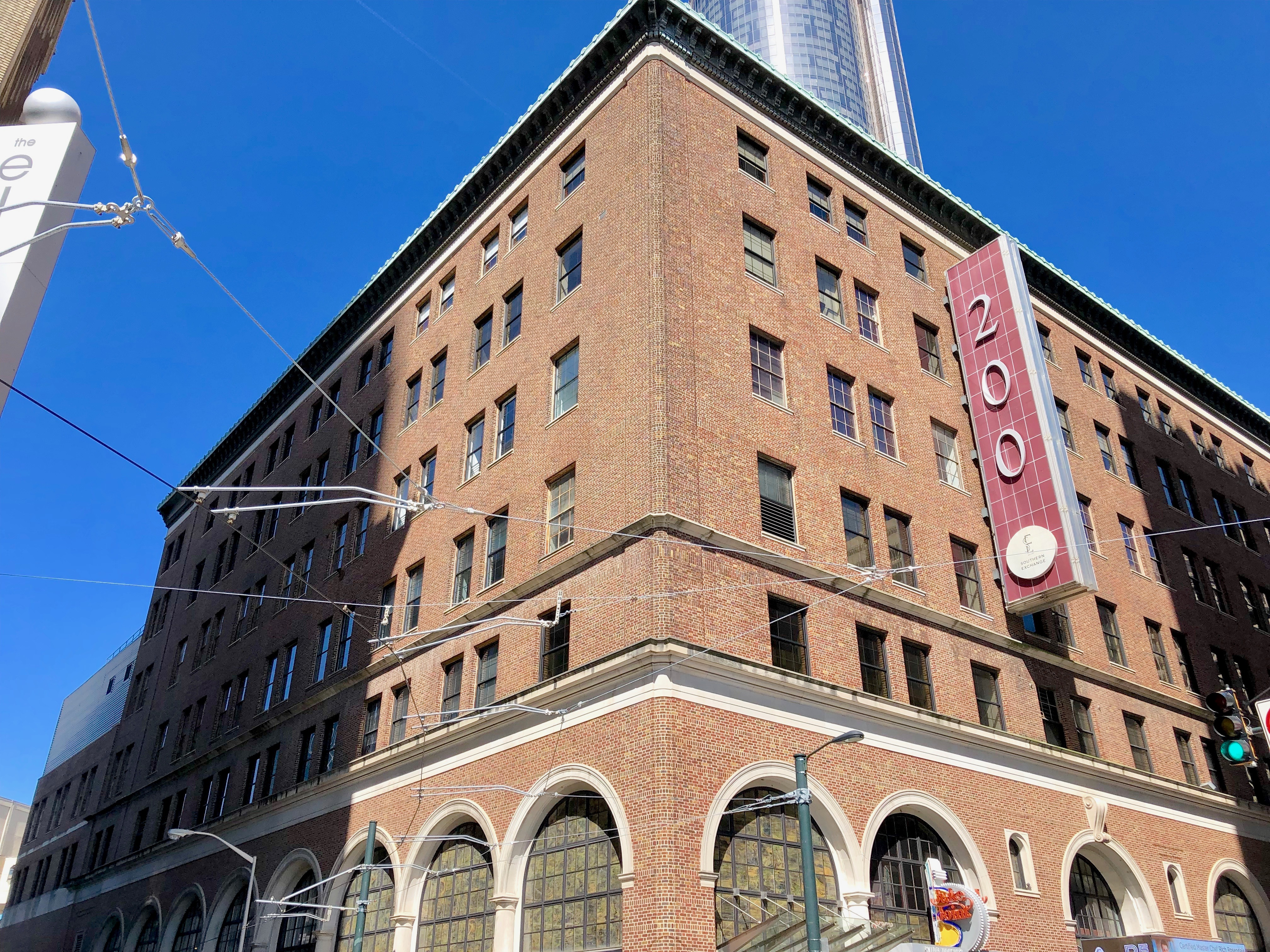
- Exterior of the former flagship store in downtown Atlanta (2019)
- Formerly: Davison & Douglas; Davison–Paxon–Stokes; Davison Paxon Co.
- Type: Division
- Industry: Retail
- Genre: Department stores
- Founded: 1891; 135 years ago in Atlanta, Georgia, United States
- Defunct: 1985; 41 years ago
- Fate: Rebranded by Macy's
- Successor: Macy's
- Headquarters: Atlanta, Georgia, United States
- Areas served: Georgia; South Carolina
- Products: Clothing; footwear; bedding; furniture; jewelry; beauty products; housewares
- Parent: Macy's (1925–1985)

Davison's was an American department store chain founded in 1891 in Atlanta, Georgia, United States. It was a local institution, and competed with Rich's in the Atlanta market. Davison's expanded throughout Georgia and South Carolina. It was acquired by Macy's in 1925, and ultimately converted to Macy's in 1985.

== History ==
=== Establishment ===
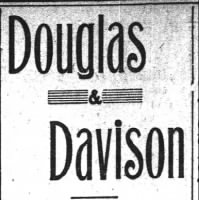
Douglas & Davison logo

Davison's first opened its doors in Atlanta in 1891 and had its origins in the Davison & Douglas company. In 1901, the store changed its name to Davison-Paxon-Stokes after the retirement of E. Lee Douglas from the business and the appointment of Frederic John Paxon as treasurer. In early 1927 the company dropped the "Stokes" to become Davison Paxon Co.

=== Acquisition by Macy's ===
While rival M. Rich Brothers Dry Goods Company remained a family owned store, Davison-Paxon-Stokes was sold to R.H. Macy & Co. in 1925. By 1927, R.H. Macy built the huge Peachtree Street store, 200 Peachtree, which still stands today.

The downtown Davison's store was a classic example of a downtown shopping experience. The main entrance on Peachtree features a very stately marble-floored cosmetics and jewelry area, modelled after Macy's flagship store on Herald Square in New York. There is a mezzanine overlooking the level with escalators leading to that floor. A bank of elevators in the rear serves floors from the basement through the sixth floor. The mezzanine and the third floor connected with the parking garage across Carnegie Way. When the Westin Peachtree Plaza Hotel opened next door in 1976, an entrance connected the two buildings, although the difference in floor heights required several steps up from Davison's into the hotel.

Davison's was owned by Macy's for sixty years under its own name, and made no effort to disguise its affiliation with Macy's. Advertisements clearly stated "Davison's - a division of R.H. Macy & Co." and charge cards from Davison's were usable at Macy's and Bamberger's (and vice versa).

=== Expansion ===
Previous Davison's logo, in use from 1970 until 1985

Over time, the Davison-Paxon Company name was shortened to simply Davison's. Not long after, the company embarked on an aggressive expansion plan across Georgia and South Carolina. Locations opened in the downtowns of Athens, Augusta, Macon and Columbus, as well as a store in downtown Columbia, South Carolina. During this time, Rich's remained exclusively in Atlanta. In Augusta, Davison's competed with the J.B. White chain and in Columbus, Kirven's was its main rival. In 1959, Davison's opened its first suburban location at Lenox Square mall along with Rich's.

Throughout the 1960s, Rich's began to very aggressively expand in the suburbs while Davison's remained a downtown player for the most part. However, Davison's did open one mall location at the now-demolished Columbia Mall (later known as Avondale Mall) near Avondale Estates. Davison's expanded once again in the 1970s and 1980s with locations at Cumberland, Southlake, Gwinnett Place, Shannon, Northlake and Perimeter Malls. New locations also replaced the downtown stores in all the other cities mentioned except Columbus, which faced stronger competition from regional chains. The Columbia store continued as the only downtown store (except for the headquarters Peachtree St. store) in the Macy's Atlanta division until it was forced to close in 1992 as part of the Chapter 11 reorganization. Today, it is the site of the Columbia Museum of Art. The new Davison's stores were typically white brick with small glass atriums at the entrance.

Davison's also sponsored the Egleston Children's Christmas Parade, whose route still passes the former downtown store location.

=== Conversion to Macy's ===
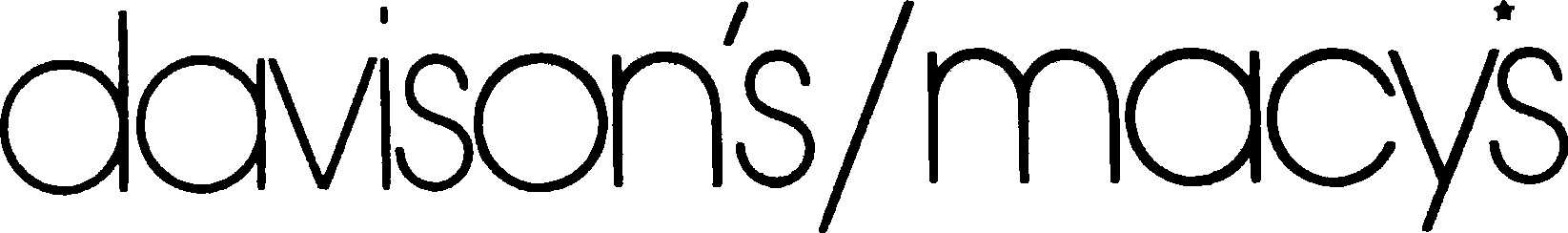
Davison's/Macy's division logo, used in 1985

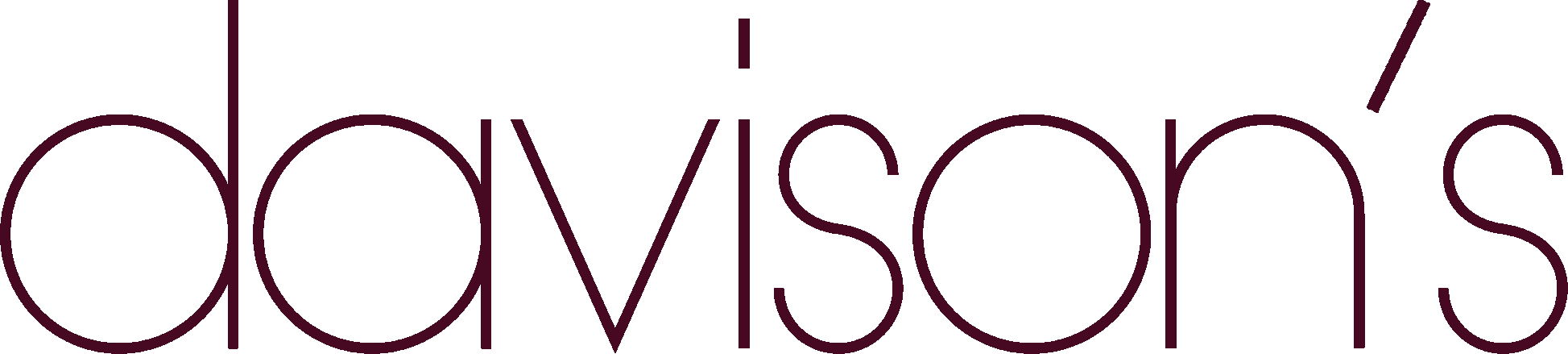
Davison's Department Store Final Logo

In the mid-1980s, Macy's began to consolidate its regional divisions to streamline its corporate structure. On February 1, 1985, Davison's and Macy's Midwest were combined into one division, Macy's Atlanta.

Macy's slowly began to retire the Davison's name. In 1984, the logo was changed to the same thin typeface of its more famous counterpart in the ITC Avant Garde font.

By November 1985, all Davison's stores were formally renamed Macy's. In February 1986, the first Atlanta-area store to begin under the Macy's name opened at Town Center at Cobb.

== Notable real estate ==
=== Flagship store ===
The downtown location no longer functions as a department store. Most of the building (338,000 square feet (31,400 m^{2})), with the address 180 Peachtree, is as of 2012 used as a data center. Another part, owned by 200 Peachtree Retail, a group of investors embarked on a major effort to transform part of the historic building — which had remained mostly vacant since Macy’s closed in 2003 — into an event center called Southern Exchange Ballrooms, that hosts conferences, weddings, parties and other special events. The group invested more than $30 million into the project. The building now features an over-11,000-square-foot (1,000 m^{2}) Whitehall ballroom, 7,000 square feet (650 m^{2}) of balcony space, 15,000 square feet (1,400 m^{2}) of The Davison Ballroom, The Cellar & The 155 event space with over 43,000 square feet, 20,000 square feet (1,860 m^{2}) of conference center space, and a 4,000-square-foot (370 m^{2}) kitchen which is home to Rosendale Events, a catering company exclusive located at Southern Exchange Ballroom led by Certified Master Chef Rich Rosendale. Additionally the venue is also home to famed Event Planner & Designer Brian Worley and his company B. Worley Productions. The historic building also features five restaurants, and recently hosted large parties from the 2019 NFL Super Bowl, Major League Soccer Digital Headquarters, SEC Championship party and will soon be host to the Golf Channel's live broadcast of the Payne Stewart Awards among many other events.

=== Branch redevelopments ===
By spring 2003, most all former Davison's stores were closed when Rich's and Macy's were consolidated under the "Rich's-Macy's" nameplate. That same year, the historic downtown Davison's/Macy's store on Peachtree Street was also closed. This ended the era of department-store shopping in downtown Atlanta. All of the old Davison's mall stores in Atlanta were left vacant except for three locations. The Perimeter Mall and Lenox Square locations were closed, renovated, and reopened several months later as Bloomingdale's in late 2003 and the Perimeter Mall location closed in March 2012 and became Von Maur and the Lenox Square location is still open as of 2021. The Northlake location was re-branded as Rich's-Macy's before changing back to simply Macy's two years later and as of Sunday January 11, 2026 this location is permanently closing for good in March . One floor of the Town Center location, which had originally opened as Macy's, became a Rich's-Macy's Furniture Gallery location. It is now a Macy's Furniture Gallery location and a Macy's Furniture Clearance Center on the upper level, and now has a Macy's Men's Store on the lower level. And Macy's Furniture Gallery on the middle level.

The remainder of Davison's former locations remain vacant except for the locations at Cumberland Mall, Avondale/Columbia Mall, Gwinnett Place and Augusta Mall. The Cumberland Mall location was torn down in late 2005 for a major overhaul at the 32-year-old center, a detached Costco now sits just to the west of the Davison's footprint The Cumberland Mall location is now a courtyard/lifestyle center containing Ted's Montana Grill closed in 2020 due to COVID-19 financial restraints, Cheesecake Factory, Pf Changs, and Maggiano's Little Italy. The Avondale/Columbia Mall location was completely demolished with the rest of the mall for a Wal-Mart SuperCenter. The Gwinnett Place location is now home to Korean chain Mega Mart. The Augusta Mall location was open till 2006 as a Macy's Furniture Showroom. It has closed to make way for a lifestyle center similar to Cumberland Mall, another General Growth Properties mall.

== Gallery ==
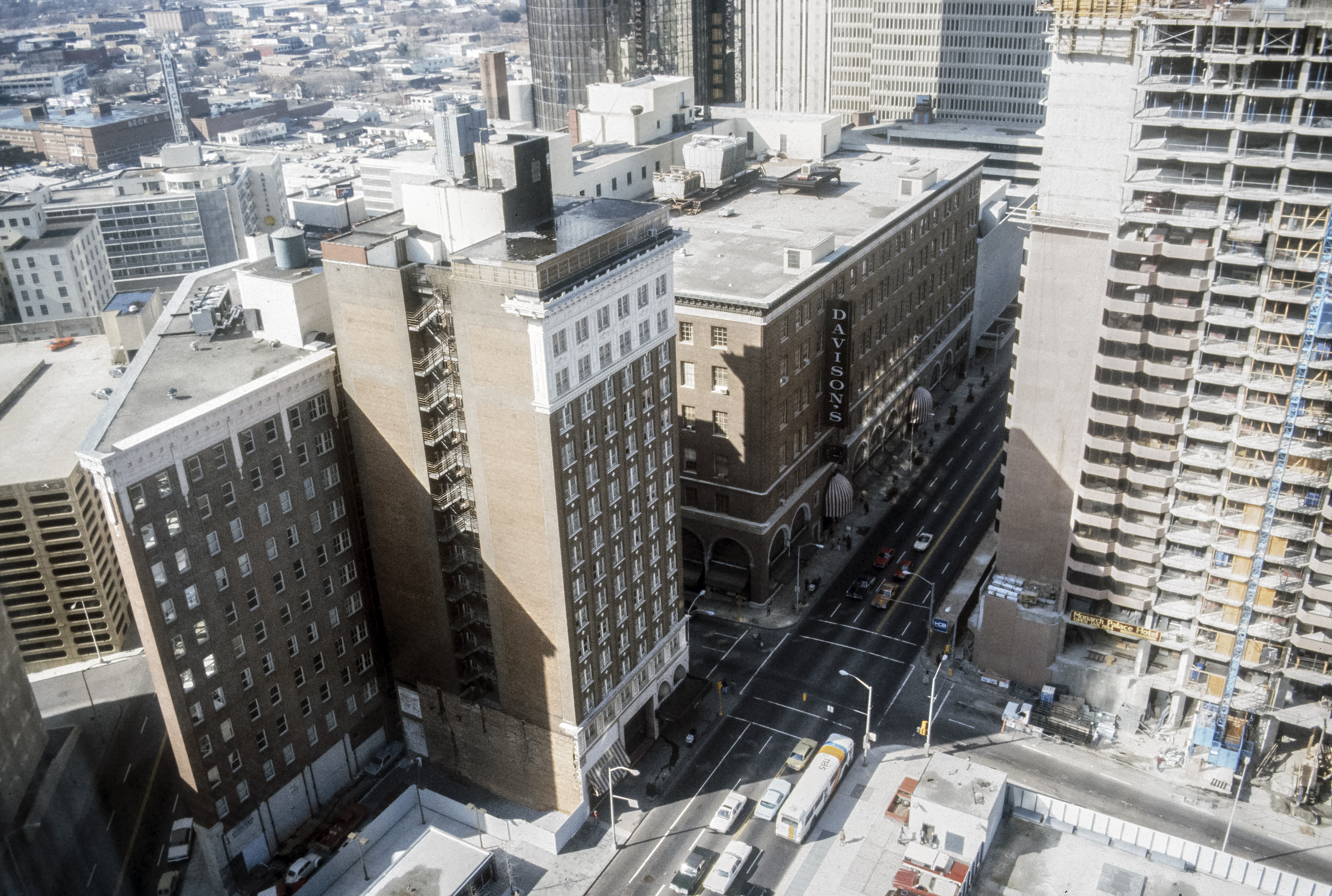
Davison's flagship store, Atlanta, 1984

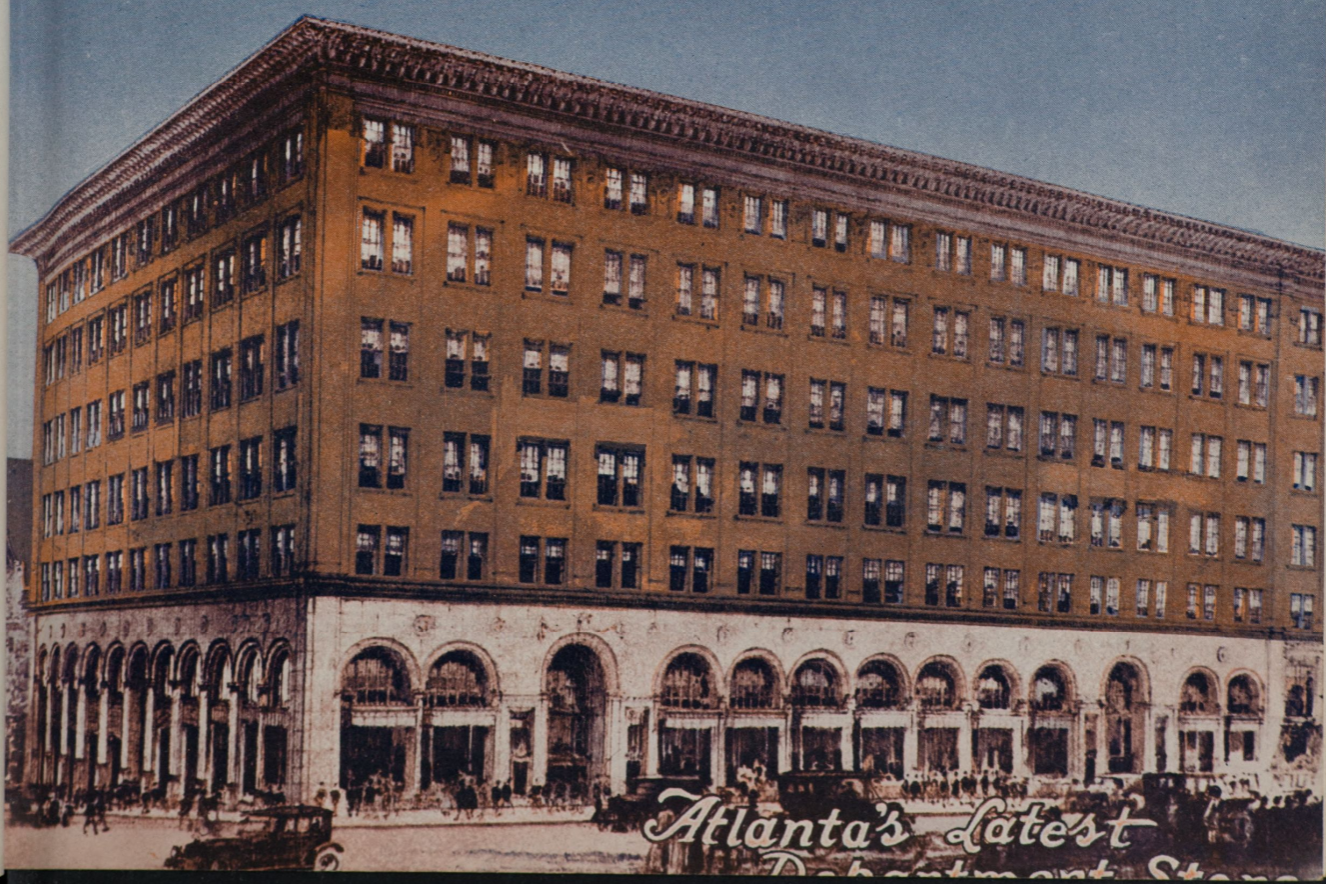
Davison-Paxon-Stokes, 1926

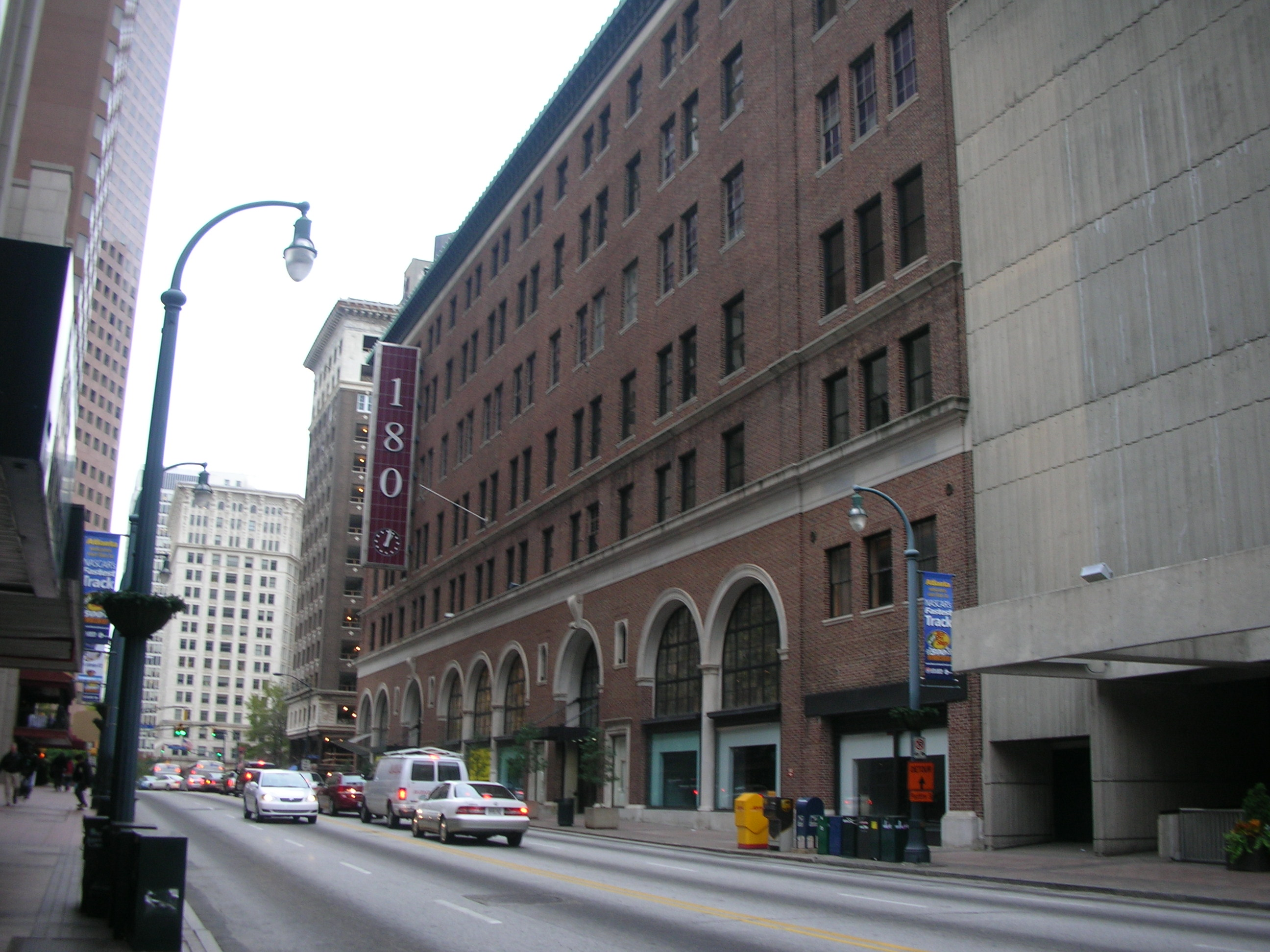
Davison's building, 2006

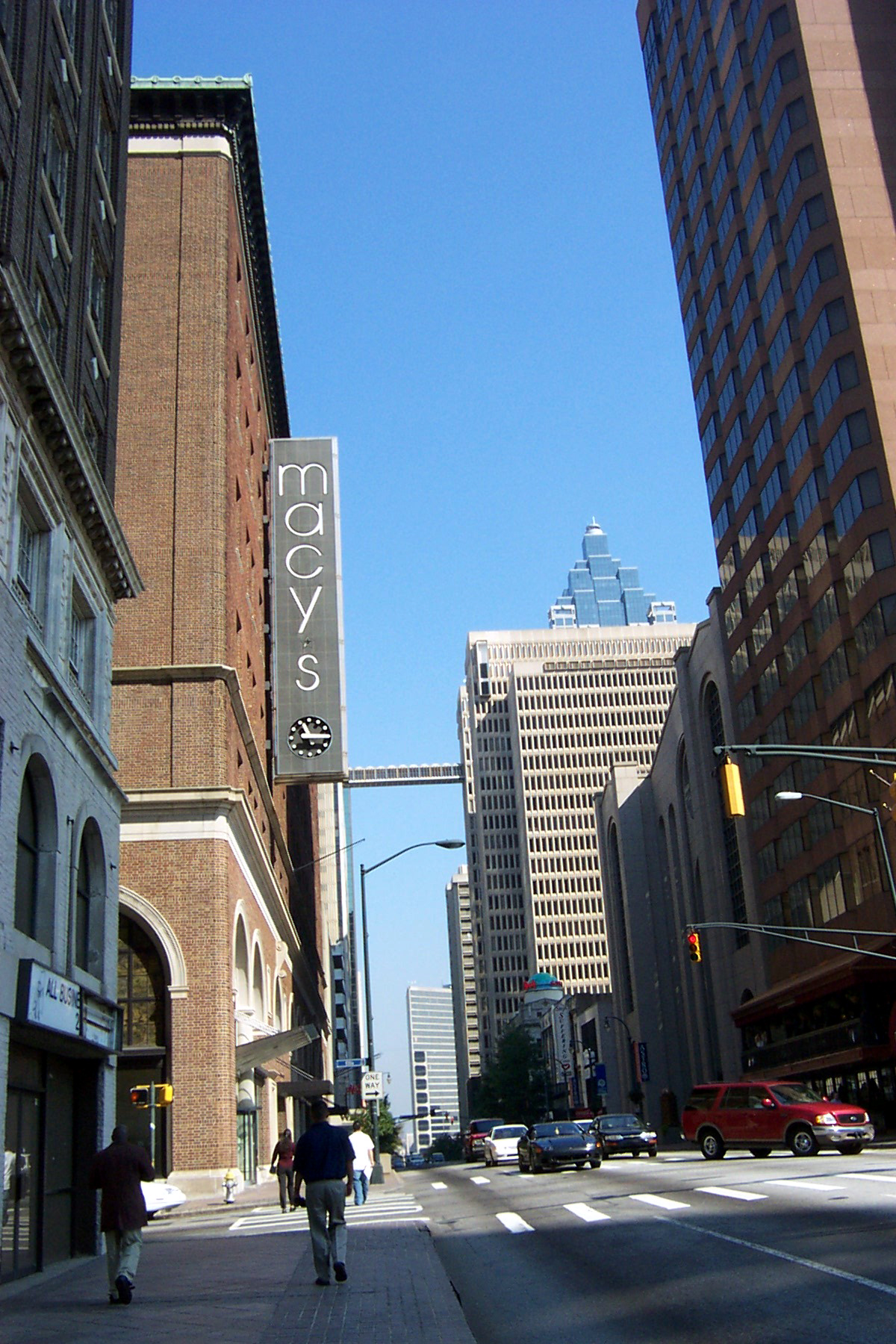
Davison's building, 2004

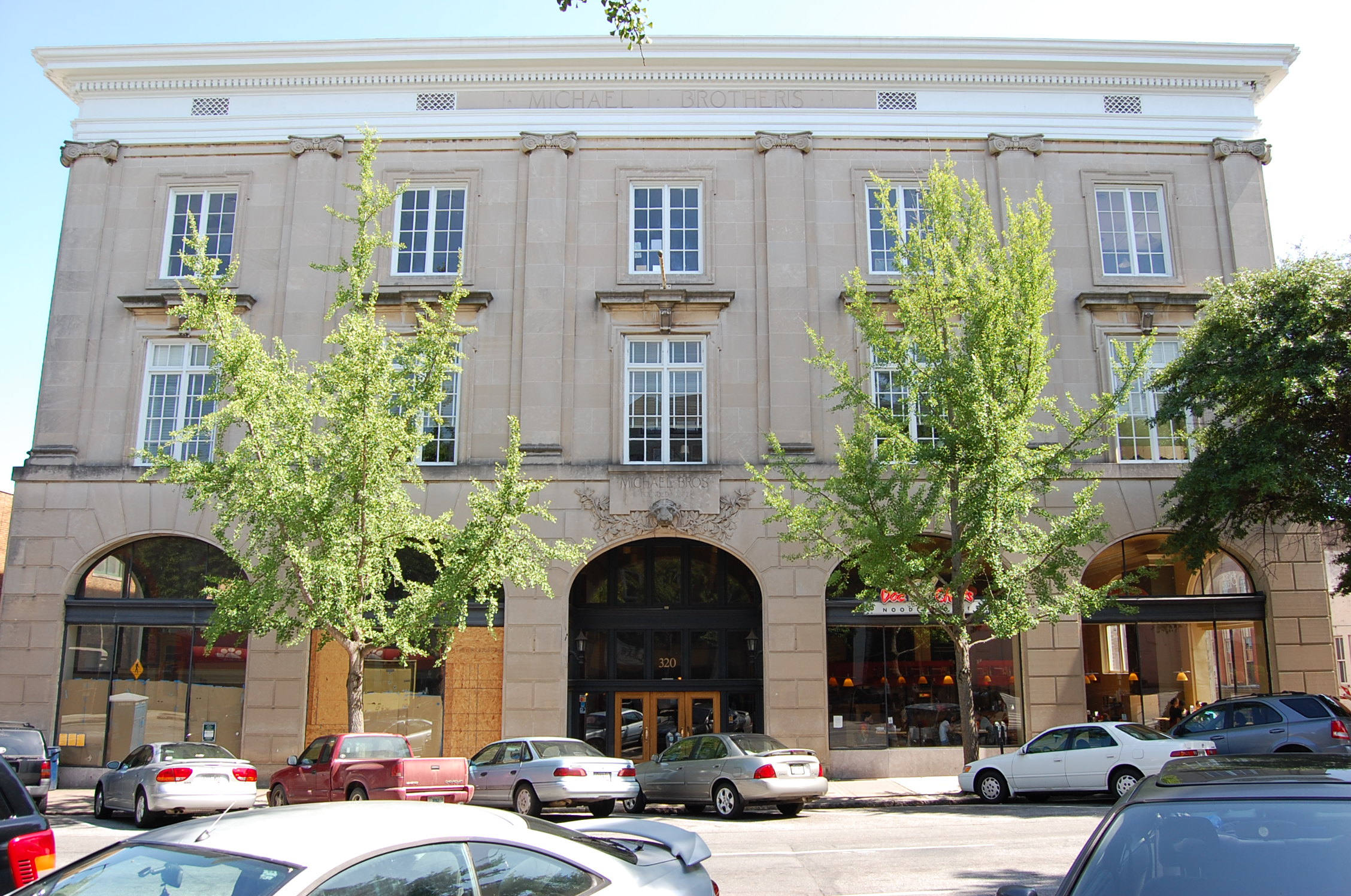
Athens downtown Davison's

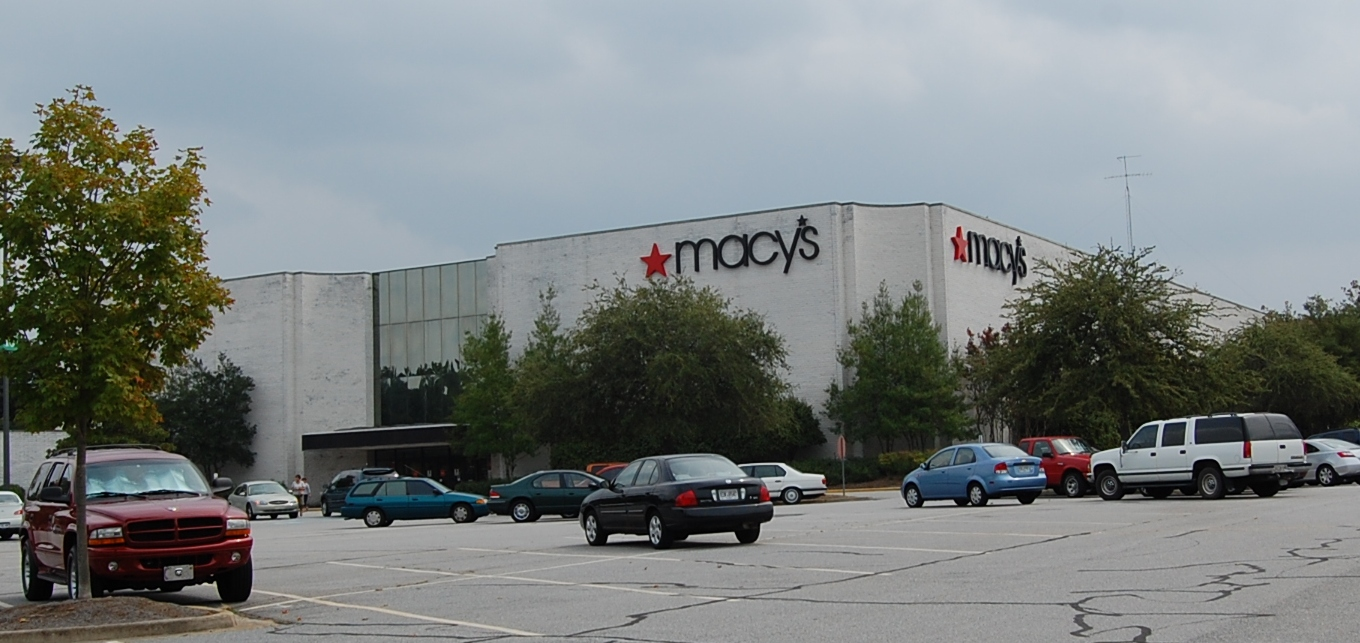
Georgia Square Mall Davison's This location closed in 2017

== See also ==
- List of defunct department stores of the United States
- List of department stores converted to Macy's
