= Children's Healthcare of Atlanta at Scottish Rite =

Children's Healthcare of Atlanta - Scottish Rite Hospital
- Children's Healthcare of Atlanta

Geography
- Location: 1001 Johnson Ferry Rd NE, Atlanta, Georgia, United States
- Coordinates: 33.9061°N 84.3537°W

Organization
- Type: Children's hospital
- Affiliated university: Emory University School of Medicine, Morehouse School of Medicine

Services
- Emergency department: Level II Pediatric Trauma Center
- Beds: 319

Helipads
- Helipad: FAA LID: GA11
Number	Length		Surface
Number	ft	m	Surface
H1	40 x 40	12 × 12	mats
H2	40 x 40	12 × 12	mats

History
- Former names: Scottish Rite Hospital for Crippled Children, Scottish Rite Children's Hospital
- Founded: Original: 1915; Current: 1976

Links
- Website: www.choa.org/locations/scottish-rite-hospital
- Lists: Hospitals in Georgia

The Children's Healthcare of Atlanta - Scottish Rite Hospital is a nationally ranked, freestanding, 319-bed, pediatric acute care children's hospital located in Atlanta, Georgia. It is affiliated with the Emory University School of Medicine and the Morehouse School of Medicine, as a member of the Children's Healthcare of Atlanta (Children's) system. The hospital provides comprehensive pediatric specialties and subspecialties to infants, children, teens, and young adults age 0–21. The hospital features a state verified level II pediatric trauma center, one of two in the state. Its regional pediatric intensive-care unit and neonatal intensive care units serve the region. The hospital also has a rooftop helipad for critical pediatric transport.

== History ==
=== Original location ===
Scottish Rite Hospital was originally founded in 1915, at a different location, to care for the region's crippled children, named the Scottish Rite Convalescent Home for Crippled Children. The hospital expanded early into its history with a 50-bed expansion taking place in 1919 with support from the Scottish Rite Freemasons of the Supreme Council, Southern Jurisdiction.

In 1965 Scottish Rite expanded their pediatric services, becoming a full-service children's hospital. They also renamed the hospital to Scottish Rite Children's Hospital to reflect the expansion of services.

=== Current location ===
As Atlanta’s population grew toward the north of the city, the hospital’s location in Decatur became less accessible. By 1969, the original Scottish Rite building had been in operation for 50 years, and the facilities needed expansion and updates. (This property is now listed on the U.S. National Register of Historic Places.) Wood W. Lovell, MD, the hospital’s third medical director, led an expansion effort to turn Scottish Rite into a full-fledged medical center. The hospital’s new expansion and updated name, Scottish Rite Children’s Hospital, launched in July 1976 at its current location in north Atlanta. The new facility held 50 beds as well as a four-bed intensive care unit. In 1977, the 200-seat Wood W. Lovell, MD, Education Center amphitheater was added for medical teaching.

In 1983 Scottish Rite Children's Hospital again expanded with the addition of 96 patient beds and a new clinical outpatient building.

On Sept. 15, 1989, the hospital was renamed to the Wilbur and Hilda Glenn Hospital for Children to honor the family that originally donated the land.

The old peoples logo of Scottish Rite prior to 1998 merger becoming Children's Healthcare of Atlanta

The 1990s brought more additions to Scottish Rite, including the Callaway Acute Care Center in 1991 and the Scottish Rite Medical Center Asthma Education Center in 1994. In 1998, the Scottish Rite Hospital merged with the Emory-affiliated Egleston Children's Hospital creating the large pediatric hospital system, Children's Healthcare of Atlanta, becoming the region's largest pediatric provider.

Scottish Rite underwent an additional expansion and renovation in 2004.

== Awards ==
In October 2023, Scottish Rite achieved Magnet recognition again for its continued dedication to nursing excellence. Conferred by the American Nurses Credentialing Center (ANCC), the world’s largest and most prestigious nurse credentialing organization, Magnet Recognition Program designation is the highest international distinction a healthcare organization can receive for nursing care. Following Scottish Rite’s first designation in 2019, Children’s understood the importance of pursuing Magnet recognition again. To achieve its second Magnet designation, Scottish Rite had to continue demonstrating an exceptional practice environment for nurses and meeting high standards for patient experience. This lengthy process included an electronic application, written patient care documentation, a three-day Magnet site visit in August 2023 and an official review by the Commission on Magnet Recognition.

== See also ==
- List of children's hospitals in the United States
- Texas Scottish Rite Hospital for Children
- Arthur M. Blank Hospital
- Emory University School of Medicine
- Hughes Spalding Children's Hospital
- Children's Healthcare of Atlanta
- Egleston Hospital
