= Leyden House =

Historic home in Atlanta, Georgia

Coordinates: 33.758979°N 84.387889°W

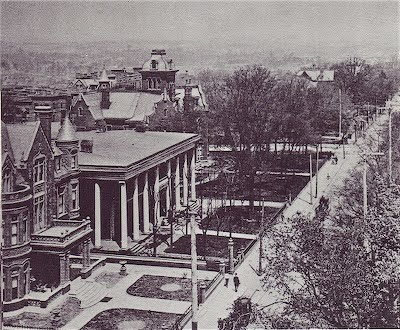
Leyden house, aerial view

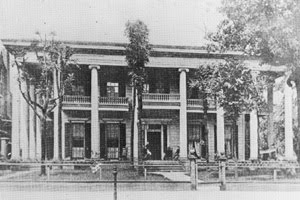
Leyden House

The Leyden House (1858 or 1859–1913) was one of Atlanta's most historic homes. It was located on 124 Peachtree Street NE between Cain (now Andrew Young International Blvd.) and Ellis streets.

The architect was John Boutell. It was an unusually grand and ambitious house for antebellum Atlanta with Ionic columns at the front and sides in Greek Revival style.

This was long the residence of Austin Leyden and his family. Leyden co-founded the Atlanta Machine Works in 1848, the first foundry in the new town of Atlanta. During the Civil War, Gen. George H. Thomas, commander of the Army of the Cumberland, used the house as his headquarters. The house was demolished in 1913 after Asa G. Candler bought the property for commercial development. The Davison's department store flagship was built on the site and still stands as the 180 Peachtree Building, as of 2012 used mostly as a data center.

Columns from the building were removed to and are preserved at the Old Woodberry School Building in Ansley Park, Atlanta, 149 Peachtree Circle.
