= 200 Peachtree =

Mixed-use building in downtown Atlanta, Georgia, United States

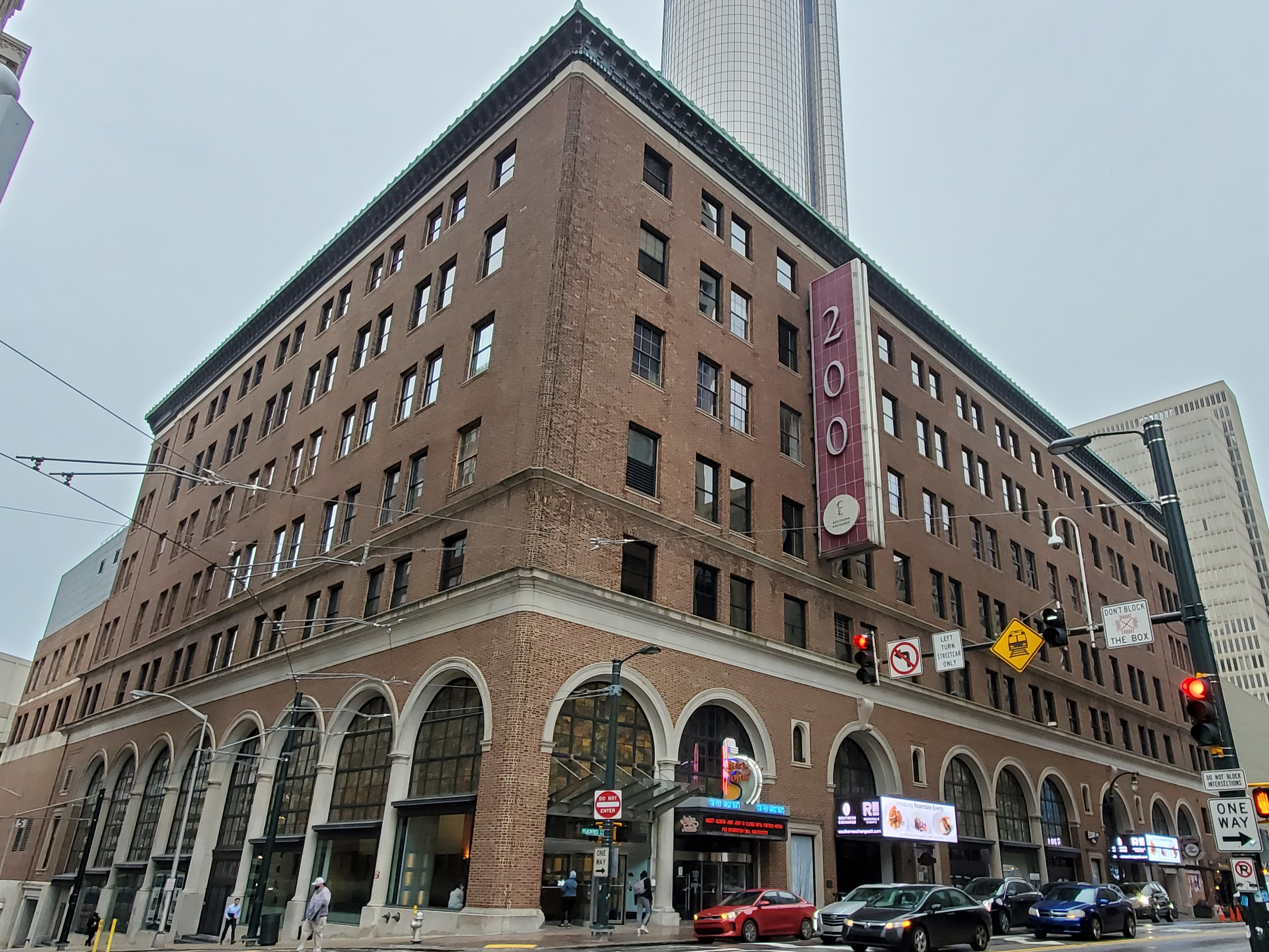
- 200 Peachtree in 2020

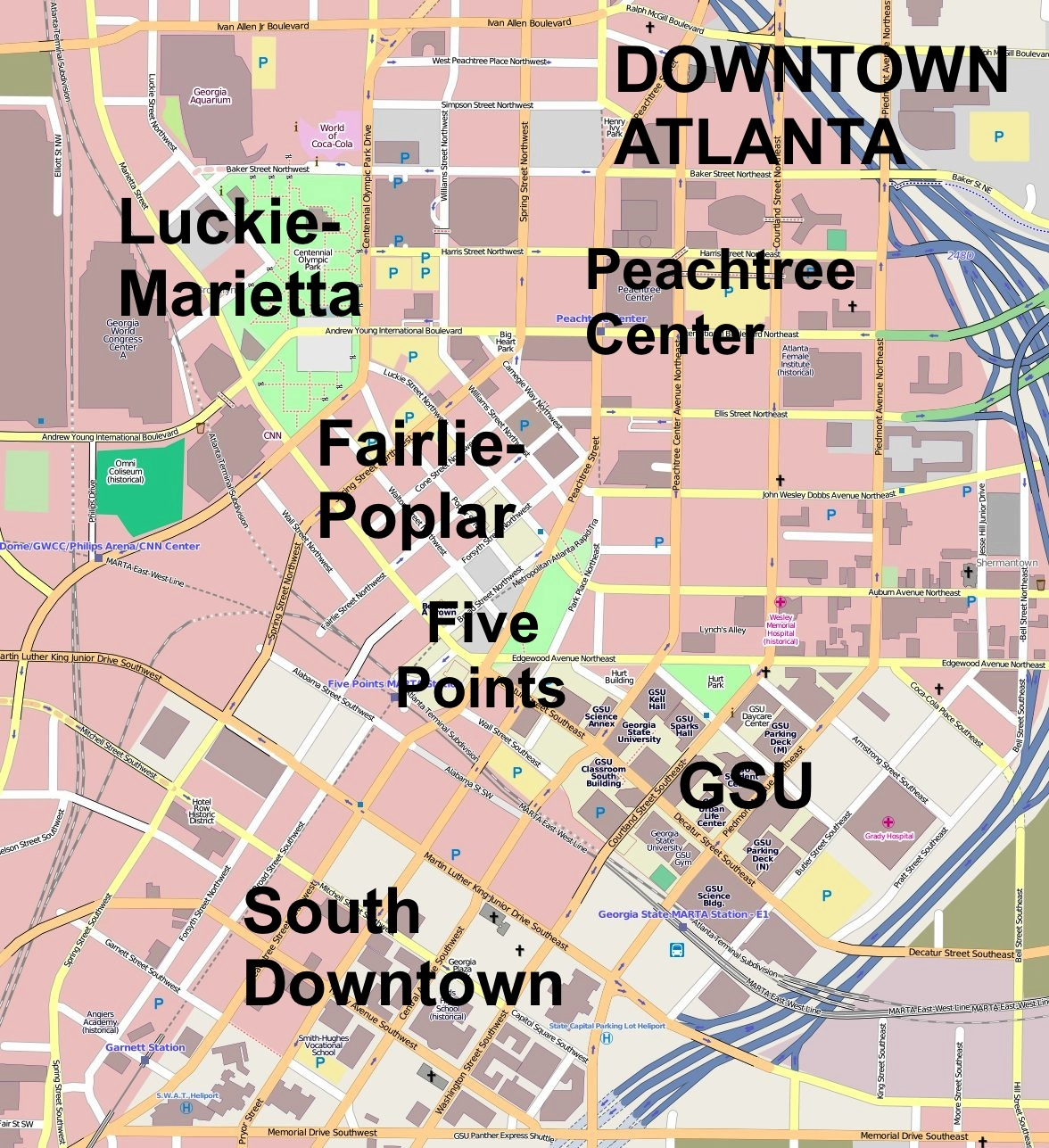
- Location within Downtown Atlanta Location within Atlanta Location within Georgia Location within the United States
- Alternative names: 180 Peachtree; Southern Exchange at 200 Peachtree

General information
- Status: Completed
- Architectural style: Italian Renaissance palazzo
- Location: 200 Peachtree Street NE; Atlanta, Georgia 30303
- Coordinates: 33°45′32″N 84°23′17″W
- Construction started: 1925
- Completed: 1927
- Opened: March 21, 1927
- Cost: $6 million

Height
- Height: 90 ft (27 m)

Technical details
- Floor count: 7
- Floor area: 523,000 sq ft (48,600 m^{2})

Design and construction
- Architects: Philip T. Shutze; Starrett & van Vleck

200 Peachtree is a mixed-use retail center in downtown Atlanta, Georgia designed by Philip T. Shutze and Starrett & van Vleck. Built in 1927 as the flagship department store for Davison's, the last department store in the building closed in 2003. The building later underwent an extensive renovation in the 2010s.

== History ==
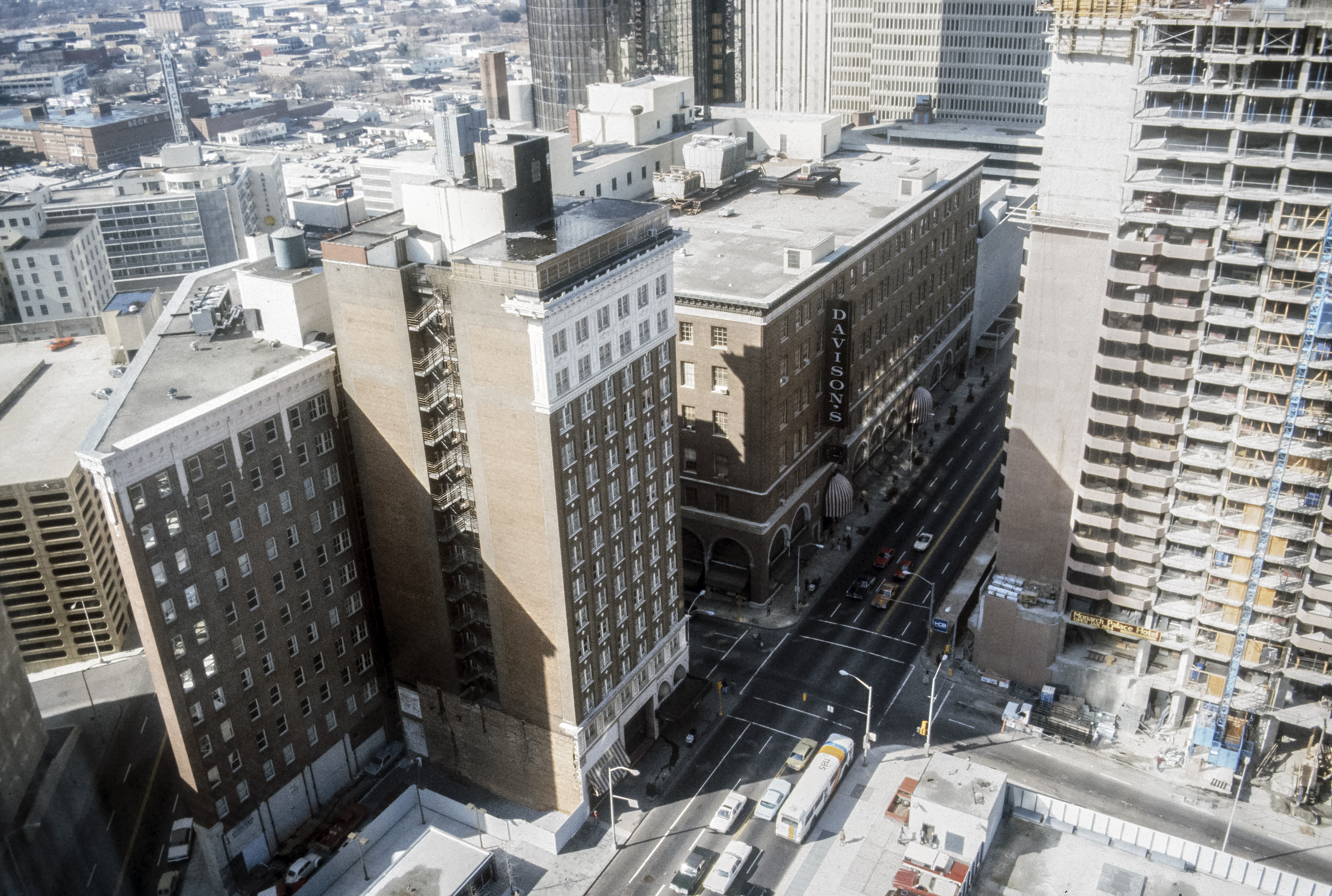
Davison's and Ellis Hotel in 1984

The idea for a large Davison's department store in downtown Atlanta was first put forth by Macy's soon after their acquisition of the Davison's brand in 1925. The cost for the building was estimated at $6 million. On April 25 of that year, Macy's signed a contract with Asa G. Candler, Inc. for them to build the large brick building on Peachtree Street, between Ellis Street and the Henry Grady Hotel. The location had previously been the site of the Leyden House, a historic home that was demolished in 1913. Atlanta-based architect Philip T. Shutze designed the building along with Starrett & van Vleck, a New York-based architecture firm that specialized in department stores. The store officially opened to the public on March 21, 1927. Upon its completion, it was the largest department store in the southern United States. In 1948, a five-story addition was added to the rear of the store, which also provided an additional entrance on Carnegie Way. In 1963, the building underwent a multimillion-dollar renovation, including the construction of a 700-car parking garage adjacent to the building. In 1985, the store dropped the Davison's name and was rebranded as Macy's. This store, the last major department store in downtown Atlanta, closed in 2003. In 2007, the Atlanta Preservation Center placed it on their list of "most endangered" historic places. In 2010, the Atlanta Development Authority authorized a $12 million mezzanine loan from the New Markets Tax Credit Program to convert the building to a mixed-use retail and event venue. In 2015, the site was rebranded as Southern Exchange at 200 Peachtree. In 2018, several tenants filed a lawsuit against the building's owners, citing unsafe conditions and intimidation tactics used by the owners.

== Bibliography ==
- Martin, Harold H. (1987). Atlanta and Environs: A Chronicle of Its People and Events, 1940s-1970s. Vol. III. University of Georgia Press. ISBN 978-0-8203-3907-8 – via Google Books.
