= Avondale Mall =

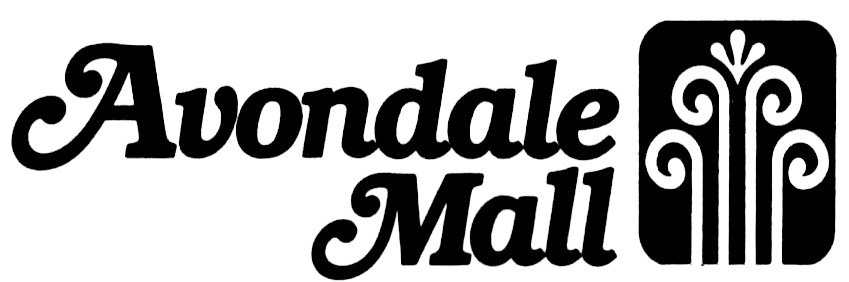

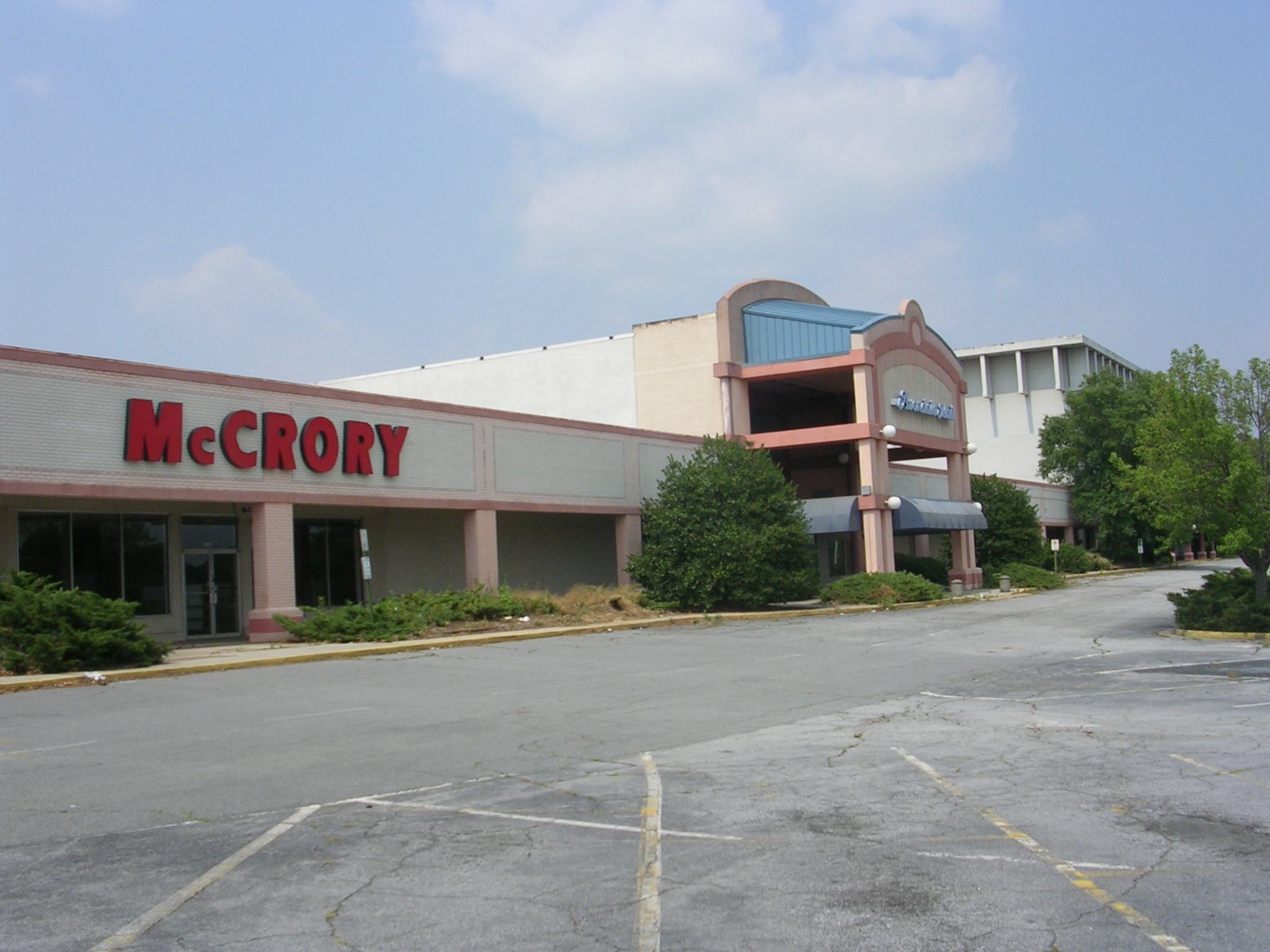
- Location: Near Avondale Estates, Georgia, United States
- Coordinates: 33°45′24″N 84°16′04″W
- Opened: 1964
- Closed: January 1, 2002
- Demolished: February–March 21, 2007
- Previous names: Columbia Mall (1964–1985)
- Developer: R.H. Macy & Company
- Num. of anchor tenants: 2
- Floor area: 400,000 square feet (37,000 m^{2})
- Floors: 1

Avondale Mall, originally Columbia Mall, was an enclosed mall in DeKalb County, Georgia, United States, with a Decatur mailing address. The mall's original name came from its location at the intersection of Columbia and Memorial Drives near Avondale Estates. It opened in 1964, closed on January 1, 2002, and was demolished in 2007. A Walmart Supercenter opened on the site in 2008.

== Anchors ==
The mall's original anchors were Davison's and Sears. Macy's developed the mall, which consisted of 400,000 square feet (37,000 m^{2}) of shop space on two levels and was the second-largest mall in Atlanta at the time. Some indoor and outdoor shopping mall scenes for the Chuck Norris film Invasion U.S.A. were filmed here in the spring and early summer of 1985, after Sears closed and before renovations began. The "entry" crash of the Chevy pickup into the mall was shot at the mall's main entrance. The scenes inside the mall with the Nissan pickup were inside the mall nearest the Davison's end. The escalator scene was inside the old Sears building, and the "exit" crash through the window was on the western side of Sears on the first level (the movie then cut to an exterior scene of a mall in South Florida).

Columbia Mall was purchased by Cadillac Fairview and Scott Hudgens Co. in 1983, who announced plans to renovate the space. At the same time, Sears announced that it would close its store there. The mall was expanded into both floors of the former Sears store, which were subdivided into smaller tenant spaces. At one time, the lower level of the old Sears building housed a new, smaller Sears Outlet Store, which became a Goody's for some time. The mall also featured a McCrory's.

== Later years ==
The decline at the mall began in the 1970s and 1980s. When the two anchor stores left in 1984 and 1995, the mall was unable to attract replacements. Management tried in 1995 to increase foot traffic. After Davison's/Macy's left the mall, that anchor building's upper floor was converted to a 16-screen movie theater, while the lower floor remained vacant except for a newly built stairwell leading from the lower level mall to the upper level theaters. This addition to the mall may have helped keep it up and running for another six years, but the mall was closed at the end of 2001.

== Demolition ==
Demolition of the mall began in February 2007. The last two walls of the old Sears came down on March 21, 2007. The former mall was replaced with a Walmart Supercenter, as well as space for condominiums and commercial outlets. This plan met with strong resistance from residents of nearby Avondale Estates. However, the Walmart opened in March 2008.
