= Atlanta Machine Works =

Coordinates: 33°44′55″N 84°22′58″W

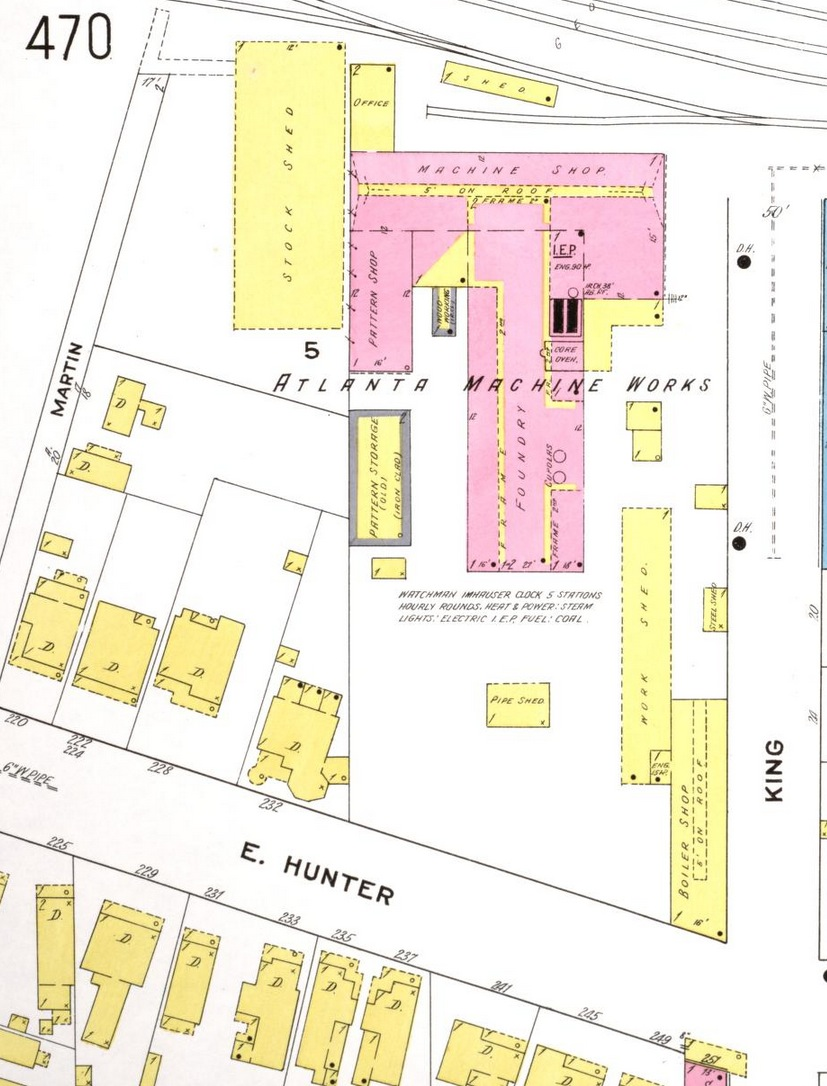
Atlanta Machine Works on Sanborn Fire Map 1911

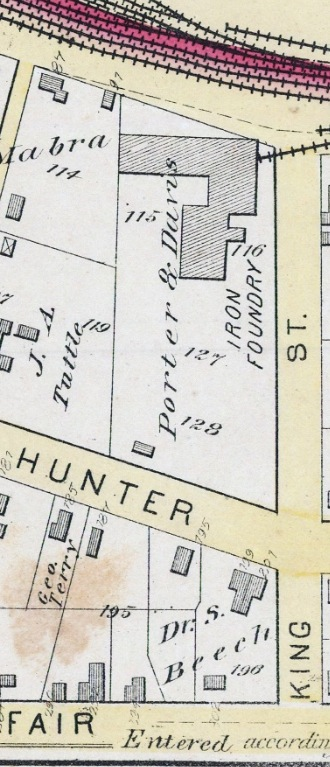
Atlanta Machine Works on city atlas 1878 (Porter & Davis was the company owning the Works at that time)

The Atlanta Machine Works was early Atlanta's first foundry and metal fabrication company. in 1848, Austin Leyden together with Robert Findlay and others established a foundry, amassed a fortune and eventually sold the company, called A. Leyden & Co., in 1853 to a business partner. Thereafter it became known as the Atlanta Machine Works and went on to play a central role in the Civil War, producing weaponry and other goods for the Confederacy. The foundry was located at the northwest corner of Hunter (now Martin Luther King, Jr. Blvd.) and King streets, now occupied by a larger industrial site only 495 metres (1,624 ft) from the Georgia State Capitol.

Between August and December, 1863, the firm delivered 2323 rounds of shot and shell to the Confederate Atlanta Arsenal. At that time the plant employed seventeen men of military age. One source states that cannon were produced here and rifled at the roundhouse of the Western & Atlantic Railroad.

The name of the company owning the Works changed several times; one name was Porter & Davis.

By the turn of the 20th century, the Atlanta Machine Works was producing agricultural and mining equipment as well as mills.
