= Diana Blank =

American philanthropist (born 1942)

- Born: Diana Latow; September 13, 1942 (age 83)
- Occupation: Philanthropist
- Spouse: Arthur Blank (divorced)
- Children: 3

Diana Latow Blank (born September 13, 1942) is an American philanthropist who founded the Kendeda Fund. She is the former wife of The Home Depot co-founder, Arthur Blank.

== Biography ==
Blank was raised in a middle class, Catholic family. After raising three children, she went back to school to study cultural anthropology and religion, graduating from Mount Holyoke at age 57. Blank founded the Kendeda Fund in 1993, and through it initially donated anonymously to various Georgia-based causes. This included $4 million to the Atlanta Symphony Orchestra in the mid-1990s; and $20 million to Children's Healthcare of Atlanta to enable the purchase of Hughes Spalding Children's Hospital, a historically-black hospital in Atlanta, in 2006.

In 2015, Blank was revealed as the person who provided a $30 million grant to Georgia Tech for the construction of what became known as The Kendeda Building for Innovative Sustainable Design. The Living Building Challenge 3.0. project has been called the "most environmentally-sound building ever constructed in the Southeast."

From 1993 through 2023, the Kendeda Fund donated more than $1 billion to support the dignity of individuals and the sustainability of communities. Through Kendeda, Blank made grants to hundreds of organizations, focusing on the issues of climate change, community wealth building, racial and economic equity, resource conservation, girls' rights, gun violence prevention, and veterans. Though she supported nonprofit organizations across the country and around the world, Blank's giving was concentrated heavily in Montana and Georgia. The name "Kendeda" comes from the names of Blank's three children, Kenny, Dena, and Danielle. Her daughter Dena Blank Kimball served as the executive director of the Kendeda Fund during its final ten years.

The Kendeda Fund closed at the end of 2023, documenting Blank's 30-year philanthropic journey with a legacy website and podcast.

== Personal life ==
She has three children with Arthur Blank (born 1942): Kenny Blank, Dena Blank Kimball, and Danielle Blank Thomsen; they divorced in 1993. Her son, Kenny Blank and his wife Nancy; and her daughter Dena and her husband Josh Kimball, serve as directors of The Arthur M. Blank Family Foundation.
