= Kendeda Building =

Kendeda Building for Innovative Sustainable Design
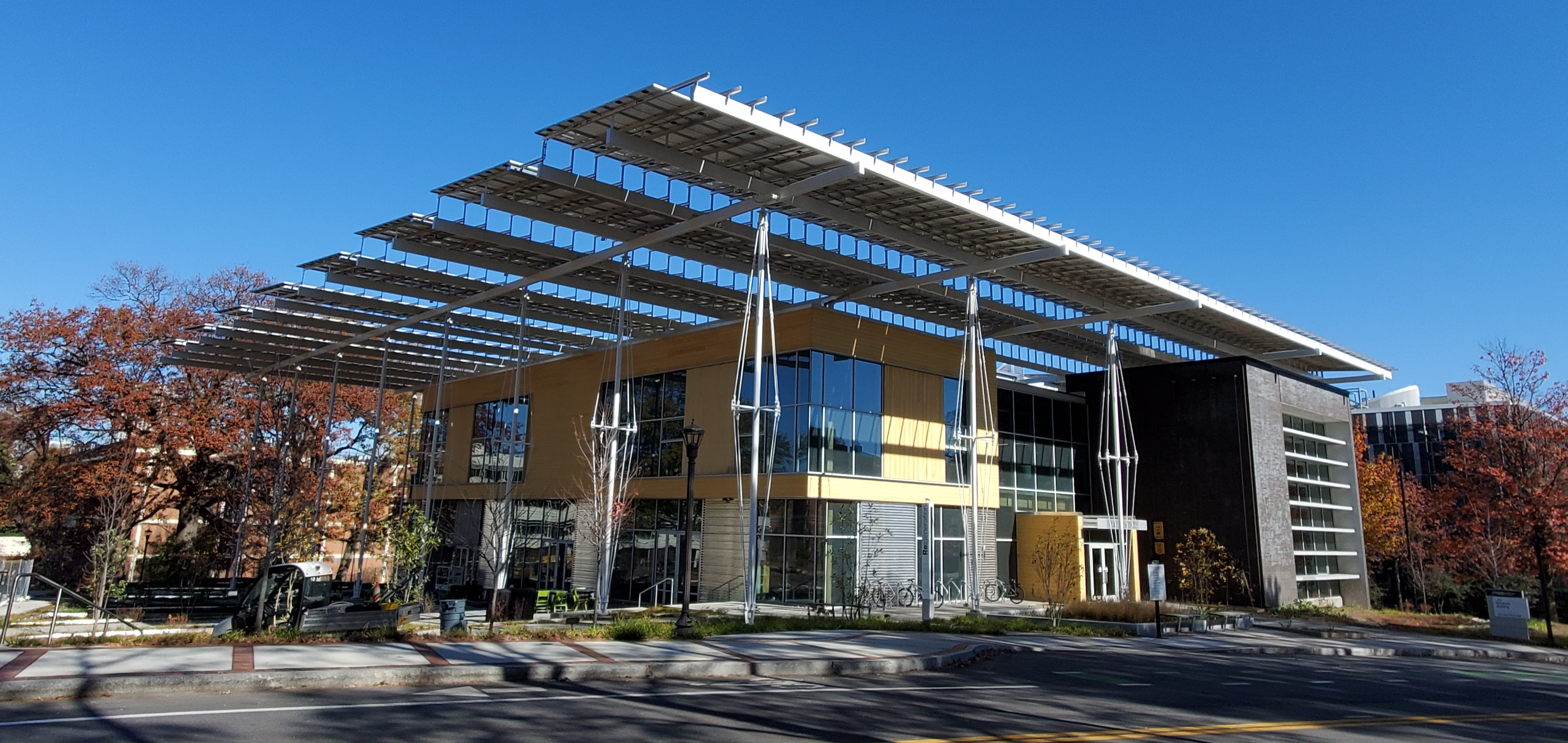
- Kendeda Building (2020)

- Location within Atlanta Kendeda Building (Georgia) Kendeda Building (the United States)

General information
- Status: Completed
- Type: Classroom and Class Lab
- Location: 422 Ferst Drive, Atlanta, Georgia, United States
- Coordinates: 33°46′43″N 84°23′58″W
- Groundbreaking: November 2, 2017
- Opened: September 21, 2019
- Cost: $25 million
- Owner: Georgia Tech

Technical details
- Floor area: 36,978 square feet (3,435.4 m^{2})

Design and construction
- Architecture firm: Lord Aeck Sargent; Miller Hull
- Structural engineer: Uzun + Case
- Other designers: Andropogon (landscape); PAE (mechanical, electrical, and plumbing engineering); Newcomb & Boyd (mechanical, electrical, and plumbing); Biohabitats (greywater systems); Long Engineering (civil engineering); Epsten Group (commissioning)
- Main contractor: Skanska

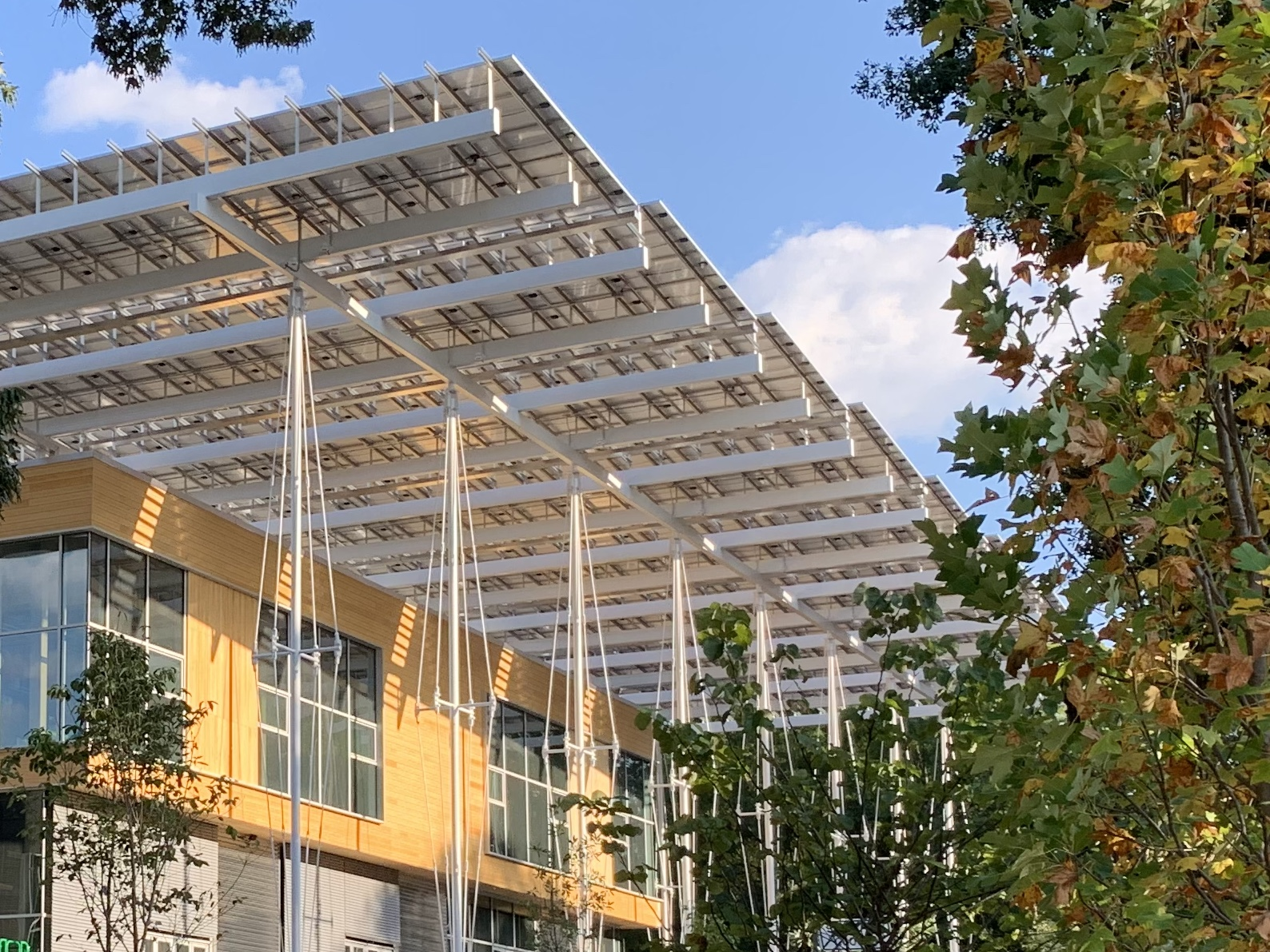
A view of the Kendeda Building from the adjacent EcoCommons.

The Kendeda Building for Innovative Sustainable Design is a multi-disciplinary, non-departmental academic building on the main campus of the Georgia Institute of Technology in Atlanta, Georgia, United States. Construction began in 2017, with the building designed to be the first Living Building Challenge-certified academic building in the Southeastern United States. It opened in late September 2019 and achieved Living Building certification in March 2021. It is the first certified Living Building in Georgia and the 28th in the world. It was designed by architectural firms Lord Aeck Sargent and Miller Hull with 100% funding for design and construction from the Kendeda Fund.

== History ==
In September 2015, the Georgia Institute of Technology received a $30 million grant from the Kendeda Fund for the purposes of building a green building on the institute's campus. The grant was the single largest donation by the Kendeda Fund and one of the largest ever received by the institute. The location selected for the building, a former parking lot, would be part of the Eco-Commons, a larger public green space on the institute's campus. The building would be designed to meet Living Building Challenge 3.1, which, according to The Atlanta Journal-Constitution, would make it "the first major Living Building Challenge-certified education and research facility in the Southeast." Of the $30 million donated to the institute, $25 million was to be used in the building's construction, with the remainder used to "support programming activities."

Construction on the building started on November 2, 2017, with designs by architectural firms Lord Aeck Sargent and Miller Hull. Skanska served as the project's construction manager, and Uzun + Case served as the structural engineering firm. Designs for the building, which would have a floor area of 43,500 square feet (4,040 m^{2}), included a maker space, an auditorium, two classrooms, and a common area, in addition to several other academic rooms. The top of the building would feature an apiary and a rooftop garden. Additionally, the roof houses approximately 900 solar panels and a rainwater collection system. The surrounding 8-acre landscape to the west, called the EcoCommons, continues the building's environmental mission by capturing stormwater and increasing biodiversity.

The building was dedicated on October 24, 2019.

== Certifications ==
Achieved:

- Living Building Challenge v3.1
- LEED v4 BD+C: New Construction - Platinum
- Georgia Audubon's Certified Wildlife Sanctuary
- Georgia Native Plant Society's Native Plant Habitat - Gold

In process:

- LEED Zero Water
- LEED Zero Energy

== Awards ==
Even prior to completion, The Kendeda Building was recognized for advancing the conversation about green buildings in the Southeast. In October 2018, the Atlanta Better Buildings Challenge presented The Kendeda Building for Innovative Sustainable Design with its annual Game Changer Award. In November 2019, the building received a "Development of Excellence" award from the Atlanta Regional Commission, In October 2020, the Metro Atlanta Chamber selected the building of its annual E3 Award, which recognized the building as one of the region’s most innovative projects at the intersection of sustainability and commerce. The Kendeda Building received the American Institute of Architects COTE Top Ten Award for 2021. The COTE Top Ten Awards is the architecture industry’s best-known awards program for sustainable design excellence. Each year, ten innovative projects earn the prize for setting the standard in design and sustainability. To be selected, projects must meet the AIA Committee on the Environment (COTE) rigorous criteria for social, economic, and ecological value.

Other awards from across the nation include:

- RecycleMania: Race to Zero Waste
- Chicago Athenaeum: American Architecture Award
- Metal Architecture Magazine: Grand Award Winner
- AIA Seattle 2020 Awards: Energy in Design Award & Merit Award
- Engineering News-Record Southeast: Best Green Project
- Autodesk Architecture, Engineering and Construction Excellence Awards: Sustainability Innovation Award
- Construction Management Association of America (South Atlantic Chapter) 2020 Awards: 3 including Project Of The Year
