= List of children's hospitals in the United States =

A children's hospital is a medical facility that offers its services exclusively to children and adolescents. Most children's hospitals can serve children from birth up to the age of 21. The number of children's hospitals proliferated in the 20th century, as pediatric medical and surgical specialties separated from internal medicine and adult surgical specialties.

Children's hospitals are characterized by greater attention to the psychosocial support of children and their families. Some children and young people have to spend relatively long periods in the hospital, so having access to play and teaching staff can also be an important part of their care. With local partnerships, this can include trips to local botanical gardens, the zoo, and public libraries, for instance.

In addition to psychosocial support, children's hospitals have the benefit of being staffed by professionals who are trained in treating children. A medical doctor who undertakes vocational training in pediatrics must also be accepted for membership by a professional college before they can practice pediatrics. While many general hospitals can treat children adequately, pediatric specialists may be a better choice when it comes to treating rare afflictions that may prove fatal or severely detrimental to young children, in some cases before birth. Also, many children's hospitals will continue to see children with rare illnesses into adulthood, allowing for continuity of care.

== Notable children's hospitals ==
Hospital	City	State	Beds	Pediatric trauma level	NICU level	# of specialties nationally ranked per US News & World Report	Picture
Children's of Alabama	Birmingham	Alabama	341	Level I Pediatric	4	9	
Huntsville Hospital for Women and Children	Huntsville	Alabama	51				k
USA Children's and Women's Hospital	Mobile	Alabama	138		3		
The Children's Hospital at Providence	Anchorage	Alaska	114	Level II Pediatric	3		
Arkansas Children's Hospital	Little Rock	Arkansas	336	Level I Pediatric	4	4	
Banner Children's at Desert	Mesa	Arizona	162		3		
Phoenix Children's Hospital	Phoenix	Arizona	457	Level I Pediatric	4	10	
Children's Center at Sutter Medical Center	Sacramento	California	121		3		
Children's Hospital Los Angeles	Los Angeles	California	401	Level I Pediatric	4	10	
Children's Hospital of Orange County	Mission Viejo	California	316	Level II Pediatric	3	7	
Lauren Small Children's Center at Bakersfield Memorial Hospital	Bakersfield	California	74	Level I Pediatric	3		
Loma Linda University Children's Hospital	Loma Linda	California	325	Level I Pediatric	4	1	
Lucile Packard Children's Hospital at Stanford	Palo Alto	California	361	Level I Pediatric	4	10	
Mattel Children's Hospital UCLA	Los Angeles	California	156	Level I Pediatric	3	6	
Miller Children's Hospital	Long Beach	California	155	Level II Pediatric	3	1	
Rady Children's Hospital	San Diego	California	337	Level I Pediatric	4	10	
Shriners Children's Northern California	Sacramento	California	80			2	
Shriners Children's Southern California	Pasadena	California					
UC Davis Medical Center	Sacramento	California	125	Level I Pediatric	4	4	
UCSF Benioff Children's Hospital	San Francisco	California	189		3	10	
UCSF Benioff Children's Hospital Oakland	Oakland	California	135	Level I Pediatric	4	10	
Valley Children's Hospital	Madera	California	358	Level II Pediatric	4	7	
Children's Hospital Colorado	Aurora	Colorado	434	Level I Pediatric	3	10	
Children's Hospital Colorado Colorado Springs	Colorado Springs	Colorado	118	Level I Pediatric			
Memorial Hospital for Children	Colorado Springs	Colorado			3		
Rocky Mountain Hospital for Children	Denver	Colorado	157	Level IV Pediatric	3		
Connecticut Children's Medical Center	Hartford	Connecticut	185	Level I Pediatric	4	5	
Yale-New Haven Children's Hospital	New Haven	Connecticut	202	Level I Pediatric	4	6	
Children's National Hospital	Washington	District of Columbia	313	Level I Pediatric	4	10	
Nemours Alfred I. duPont Hospital for Children	Wilmington	Delaware	208	Level I Pediatric	4	4	
AdventHealth For Children	Orlando	Florida	198		3	1	
Arnold Palmer Hospital for Children	Orlando	Florida	210	Level I Pediatric	3	5	
Golisano Children's Hospital of Southwest Florida	Fort Myers	Florida	128		3		
Holtz Children's Hospital	Miami	Florida	217		3	1	
Joe DiMaggio Children's Hospital	Hollywood	Florida	215	Level I Pediatric	4	6	
Johns Hopkins All Children's Hospital	St. Petersburg	Florida	259	Level II Pediatric	4	8	
Nemours Children's Hospital	Orlando	Florida	92				
Nicklaus Children's Hospital	Miami	Florida	281	Level I Pediatric	3	5	
Palm Beach Children's Hospital	West Palm Beach	Florida	134		3		
Salah Foundation Children's Hospital	Fort Lauderdale	Florida	135		3		
Shriners Children's Florida	Tampa	Florida					
St. Joseph's Children's Hospital	Tampa	Florida	218		3		
Studer Family Children's Hospital	Pensacola	Florida	121	Level I Pediatric	3		
UF Health Shands Children's Hospital	Gainesville	Florida	208		4	8	
Wolfson Children's Hospital	Jacksonville	Florida	272	Level I Pediatric	4	3	
Children's Healthcare of Atlanta: Arthur M. Blank Hospital; Hughes Spalding Children's Hospital; Scottish Rite Children's Hospital	Atlanta	Georgia	614	Level I Pediatric	4	10	
The Children's Hospital at The Medical Center of Central Georgia	Macon	Georgia	73		3		
Dwaine & Cynthia Willett Children's Hospital of Savannah	Savannah	Georgia			3		
Children's Hospital of Georgia	Augusta	Georgia	117	Level II Pediatric	3		
Kapi'olani Medical Center for Women & Children	Honolulu	Hawaii	144		3		
Shriners Children's Hawaii	Honolulu	Hawaii	24				
St. Luke's Children's Hospital	Boise	Idaho	113		4		
Advocate Children's Hospital	Oak Lawn and Park Ridge	Illinois	250		3	1	
Ann and Robert H. Lurie Children's Hospital of Chicago	Chicago	Illinois	360	Level I Pediatric	3	10	
The Children's Hospital of Illinois	Peoria	Illinois	144	Level I Pediatric	3	1	
La Rabida Children's Hospital	Chicago	Illinois	30				
Rush University Children's Hospital	Chicago	Illinois	115		3		
St. John's Children's Hospital	Springfield	Illinois	78	Level II Pediatric	3		
Shriners Children's Chicago	Chicago	Illinois	60				
University of Chicago Comer Children's Hospital	Chicago	Illinois	161	Level I Pediatric	4	2	
Beacon Children's Hospital	South Bend	Indiana	85		3		
Riley Hospital for Children	Indianapolis	Indiana	354	Level I Pediatric	4	9	
Peyton Manning Children's Hospital	Indianapolis	Indiana		Level I Pediatric	4		
Blank Children's Hospital	Des Moines	Iowa	108		3		
MercyOne Children's Hospital	Des Moines	Iowa	91	Level II Pediatric	4		
University of Iowa Stead Family Children's Hospital	Iowa City	Iowa	187	Level I Pediatric	4	5	
Children's Mercy Hospital Kansas	Overland Park	Kansas			3		
Norton Children's Hospital	Louisville	Kentucky	300	Level I Pediatric	4	2	
Shriners Children's Lexington	Lexington	Kentucky	50			1	
University of Kentucky Children's Hospital	Lexington	Kentucky	157	Level I Pediatric	3	2	
Manning Family Children's Hospital	New Orleans	Louisiana	263		4		
Our Lady of the Lake Children's Hospital	Baton Rouge	Louisiana	90				
Ochsner Hospital for Children	New Orleans	Louisiana	113		4	1	
Shriners Children's Shreveport	Shreveport	Louisiana	45				
Barbara Bush Children's Hospital	Portland	Maine	92		4		
The Herman & Walter Samuelson Children's Hospital at Sinai	Baltimore	Maryland	22		3		
Johns Hopkins Children's Center	Baltimore	Maryland	196	Level I Pediatric	4	10	
Kennedy Krieger Institute	Baltimore	Maryland					
Mt. Washington Pediatric Hospital	Baltimore	Maryland	67				
University of Maryland Children's Hospital	Baltimore	Maryland	117		4	1	
Baystate Children's Hospital	Springfield	Massachusetts		Level II Pediatric	3		
Boston Children's Hospital	Boston	Massachusetts	475	Level I Pediatric	4	10	
Floating Hospital for Children	Boston	Massachusetts	62	Level I Pediatric	3		
Franciscan Hospital for Children	Boston	Massachusetts	74				
MassGeneral Hospital for Children	Boston	Massachusetts	100	Level I Pediatric	3	5	
North Shore Children's Hospital	Salem	Massachusetts			2		
Shriners Children's Boston	Boston	Massachusetts	30				
Shriners Children's New England	Springfield	Massachusetts	40				
UMass Memorial Children's Medical Center	Worcester	Massachusetts	101	Level I Pediatric	3		
Ascension St. John Children's Hospital	Detroit	Michigan	83	Level II Pediatric	3		
Bronson Methodist Children's Health	Kalamazoo	Michigan					
C.S. Mott Children's Hospital	Ann Arbor	Michigan	244	Level I Pediatric	4	10	
Children's Hospital of Michigan	Detroit	Michigan	227	Level I Pediatric	4	6	
Helen DeVos Children's Hospital	Grand Rapids	Michigan	241	Level I Pediatric	4	7	
Hurley Children's Hospital	Flint	Michigan	42	Level II Pediatric	3		
Children's Minnesota	St. Paul and Minneapolis	Minnesota	384	Level I Pediatric	3	2	
Essentia Health-St. Mary's Children's Hospital	Duluth	Minnesota		Level II Pediatric	3		
Gillette Children's Specialty Healthcare	St. Paul	Minnesota	60	Level I Pediatric			
Mayo Eugenio Litta Children's Hospital	Rochester	Minnesota	148	Level I Pediatric	4	8	
M Health Fairview Masonic Children's Hospital	Minneapolis	Minnesota	212	Level III Pediatric; Level IV Neonatal	4	3	
The Children's Hospital at HCMC	Minneapolis	Minnesota		Level I Pediatric	3		
Shriners Children's Twin Cities	Woodbury	Minnesota					
Children's of Mississippi	Jackson	Mississippi	256		4		
Cardinal Glennon Children's Hospital	St. Louis	Missouri	176		4	6	
Children's Mercy Hospital	Kansas City	Missouri	364	Level I Pediatric	4	9	
Mercy Kids Children's Hospital St. Louis	St. Louis	Missouri	248		3		
Ranken Jordan Pediatric Bridge Hospital	Maryland Heights	Missouri	34				
St. Louis Children's Hospital	St. Louis	Missouri	390	Level I Pediatric	4	10	
Shriners Children's St. Louis	St. Louis	Missouri	12			1	
University of Missouri Women's and Children's Hospital	Columbia	Missouri	126		3		
Montana Children's Medical Center	Kalispell	Montana	20				
Children's Nebraska	Omaha	Nebraska	140	Level I Pediatric	4	4	
Children's Hospital of Nevada	Las Vegas	Nevada	77	Level II Pediatric	3		
Renown Children's Hospital	Reno	Nevada	83		3		
Sunrise Children's Hospital	Las Vegas	Nevada			3		
Children's Hospital at Dartmouth (CHaD)	Lebanon	New Hampshire	51	Level II Pediatric	3		
Bristol Myers Squibb Children's Hospital	New Brunswick	New Jersey	105	Level II Pediatric	3		
The Children's Hospital at Saint Peter's University Hospital	New Brunswick	New Jersey			3	1	
Children's Hospital of New Jersey	Newark	New Jersey			3		
Children's Specialized Hospital	New Brunswick	New Jersey	140				
Goryeb Children's Hospital	Morristown	New Jersey	69		4		
Joseph M. Sanzari Children's Hospital	Hackensack	New Jersey	105		3	1	
K. Hovnanian Children's Hospital	Neptune	New Jersey	88	Level II Pediatric	3	1	
St. Joseph's Children's Hospital	Paterson	New Jersey			3		
Children's Regional Hospital at Cooper	Camden	New Jersey	61	Level II Pediatric	3		
University Hospital Pediatrics	Newark	New Jersey			3		
Unterberg Children Hospital	Long Branch	New Jersey	70		3		
University of New Mexico Children's Hospital	Albuquerque	New Mexico	130	Level I Pediatric	4		
Blythedale Children's Hospital	Valhalla	New York	86				
Children's Hospital at Montefiore	New York City (The Bronx)	New York	193		3	5	
Golisano Children's Hospital	Rochester	New York	190	Level I Pediatric	4	1	
Upstate Golisano Children's Hospital	Syracuse	New York					
Hassenfeld Children's Hospital	New York City (Manhattan)	New York	102		3		
Komansky Center for Children's Health	New York City (Manhattan)	New York	103	Level II Pediatric	4	8	
Kravis Children's Hospital	New York City (Manhattan)	New York	102			4	
Maria Fareri Children's Hospital	Valhalla	New York	136	Level I Pediatric	4		
Memorial Sloan Kettering Children's Cancer Center	New York City (Manhattan)	New York				1	
Morgan Stanley Children's Hospital	New York City (Manhattan)	New York	193	Level I Pediatric	3	8	
St. Mary's Hospital for Children	New York City (Queens)	New York	103				
Steven and Alexandra Cohen Children's Medical Center of New York	New Hyde Park	New York	146	Level I Pediatric	4	9	
Stony Brook Children's Hospital	Stony Brook	New York	106	Level I Pediatric	3		
Golisano Children's Hospital of Buffalo	Buffalo	New York	250	Level I Pediatric	4		
Duke Children's Hospital	Durham	North Carolina	151		4	9	
Jeff Gordon's Children's Hospital	Concord	North Carolina			3		
Levine Children's Hospital	Charlotte	North Carolina	247	Level I Pediatric	4	8	
Hemby Children's Hospital	Charlotte	North Carolina			4		
UNC Children's Hospital	Chapel Hill	North Carolina	150	Level I Pediatric	4	7	
Maynard Children's Hospital	Greenville	North Carolina	130	Level II Pediatric	3		
Brenner Children's Hospital	Winston-Salem	North Carolina	137	Level I Pediatric	4		
Akron Children's Hospital	Akron	Ohio	434	Level II Pediatric	3	4	
Cincinnati Children's Hospital Medical Center	Cincinnati	Ohio	634	Level I Pediatric	4	10	
Cleveland Clinic Children's Hospital	Cleveland	Ohio	389		3	10	
Dayton Children's Hospital	Dayton	Ohio	167	Level I Pediatric	3	2	
Nationwide Children's Hospital	Columbus	Ohio	673	Level I Pediatric	3	10	
Rainbow Babies & Children's Hospital	Cleveland	Ohio	237	Level I Pediatric	4	8	
Shriners Children's Ohio	Dayton	Ohio					
Toledo Children's Hospital	Toledo	Ohio	99	Level II Pediatric	3		
Mercy Health — Children's Hospital	Toledo	Ohio		Level II Pediatric	3		
The Children's Hospital at Saint Francis	Tulsa	Oklahoma	144		3		
The Children's Hospital of Oklahoma	Oklahoma City	Oklahoma	246	Level I Pediatric	4		
Doernbecher Children's Hospital	Portland	Oregon	145	Level I Pediatric	3	5	
Randall Children's Hospital at Legacy Emanuel	Portland	Oregon	181	Level I Pediatric	3		
Shriners Children's Portland	Portland	Oregon	29				
Children's Hospital of Philadelphia	Philadelphia	Pennsylvania	541	Level I Pediatric	4	10	
Janet Weis Children's Hospital	Danville	Pennsylvania	91	Level II Pediatric	4		
Lehigh Valley Reilly Children's Hospital	Allentown	Pennsylvania	85	Level II Pediatric	4		
Penn State Children's Hospital	Hershey	Pennsylvania	145	Level I Pediatric	4	5	
St. Christopher's Hospital for Children	Philadelphia	Pennsylvania	119	Level I Pediatric	4		
Shriners Children's Erie	Erie	Pennsylvania					
Shriners Children's Philadelphia	Philadelphia	Pennsylvania	49				
UPMC Children's Hospital of Pittsburgh	Pittsburgh	Pennsylvania	302	Level I Pediatric	4	10	
Puerto Rico Children's Hospital	Bayamón	Puerto Rico	150		3		
San Jorge Children's Hospital	San Juan	Puerto Rico	87				
University Pediatric Hospital (Medical Science Campus)	San Juan	Puerto Rico	54		3		
Hasbro Children's Hospital	Providence	Rhode Island	63	Level I Pediatric			
Bradley Hospital (Children's Psychiatric)	Providence	Rhode Island	16				
Women & Infants Hospital of Rhode Island	Providence	Rhode Island	80		4		
AnMed Health Women's and Children's Hospital	Anderson	South Carolina	72				
Prisma Health Children's Hospital–Upstate (formerly Children's Hospital of Greenville Health System)	Greenville	South Carolina	170		3		
MUSC Shawn Jenkins Children's Hospital	Charleston	South Carolina	250	Level I Pediatric	4	4	
Prisma Health Children's Hospital–Midlands (formerly Palmetto Health Children's Hospital)	Columbia	South Carolina	163	Level II Pediatric	3		
Shriners Children's Greenville	Greenville	South Carolina	50				
Sanford Health Children's Hospital	Sioux Falls	South Dakota	118	Level II Pediatric	3		Sanford USD Children's Hospital
Children's Hospital at Erlanger	Chattanooga	Tennessee	128		3		
East Tennessee Children's Hospital	Knoxville	Tennessee	152		3		
Le Bonheur Children's Medical Center	Memphis	Tennessee	250	Level I Pediatric	4	7	
Monroe Carell Jr. Children's Hospital at Vanderbilt	Nashville	Tennessee	267	Level I Pediatric	4	10	
Niswonger Children's Hospital	Johnson City	Tennessee	73		3		
St. Jude Children's Research Hospital	Memphis	Tennessee	69			1	
Children's Hospital of San Antonio	San Antonio	Texas	198	Level I Pediatric			
Children's Medical Center Dallas	Dallas	Texas	496	Level I Pediatric	4	10	
Children's Memorial Hermann Hospital	Houston	Texas	310	Level I Pediatric	4	2	
Cook Children's Healthcare System	Fort Worth	Texas	391	Level II Pediatric	4	2	
Covenant Children's Hospital	Lubbock	Texas	275	Level II Pediatric	4		
Dell Children's Medical Center of Central Texas	Austin	Texas	212	Level I Pediatric	3		
Driscoll Children's Hospital	Corpus Christi	Texas	191		4		
Edinburg Children's Hospital	Edinburg	Texas	107		3		
El Paso Children's Hospital	El Paso	Texas	122		3		
John Sealy Children's Hospital	Galveston	Texas			4		
Medical City Children's Hospital	Dallas	Texas	181	Level II Pediatric	3		
Methodist Children's Hospital	San Antonio	Texas			3		
Providence Memorial Children's Hospital	El Paso	Texas			3		
McLane Children's Hospital	Temple	Texas	112	Level II Pediatric	4		
Shriners Children' Texas	Galveston	Texas	30				
Texas Children's Hospital	Houston	Texas	973	Level I Pediatric	4	10	
Texas Scottish Rite Hospital for Children	Dallas	Texas	52			1	
Primary Children's Hospital	Salt Lake City	Utah	289	Level I Pediatric	3	8	
Shriners Children's Salt Lake City	Salt Lake City	Utah	45			1	
University of Vermont Children's Hospital	Burlington	Vermont	58	Level II Pediatric	3		
Carilion Clinic Children's Hospital	Roanoke	Virginia	92		3		
Children's Hospital of Richmond at VCU	Richmond	Virginia	102	Level 1 Pediatric		4	
Children's Hospital of The King's Daughters	Norfolk	Virginia	185	Level 1 Pediatric	4		
INOVA Children's Hospital	Falls Church	Virginia	241		4	1	
University of Virginia Children's Hospital	Charlottesville	Virginia	111		4	5	
Saint Mary's Children's Hospital	Richmond	Virginia			3		
Mary Bridge Children's Hospital	Tacoma	Washington	75	Level II Pediatric	4		
Sacred Heart Children's Hospital	Spokane	Washington	160		3		
Seattle Children's	Seattle	Washington	360		4	10	
Shriners Children's Spokane	Spokane	Washington	30				
CAMC Women and Children's Hospital	Charleston	West Virginia			3		
Hoops Family Children's Hospital	Charleston	West Virginia	51		3		
West Virginia University Children's Hospital	Morgantown	West Virginia	105	Level II Pediatric	4	1	
American Family Children's Hospital	Madison	Wisconsin	101	Level I Pediatric	4	1	
Children's Hospital of Wisconsin	Wauwatosa	Wisconsin	184	Level I Pediatric	4	6	
Children's Hospital of Wisconsin-Fox Valley	Neenah	Wisconsin			3		
Marshfield Children's Hospital	Marshfield	Wisconsin			3		
