= Children's Healthcare of Atlanta =

Children's healthcare system in Atlanta, Georgia, U.S.

Geography
- Location: Atlanta area, Georgia, United States

Organization
- Type: Specialist
- Affiliated university: Emory University School of Medicine; Morehouse School of Medicine; Mercer University School of Medicine

Services
- Speciality: Pediatric hospital

History
- Founded: 1998; 28 years ago

Links
- Website: choa.org
- Lists: Hospitals in Georgia
- Other links: Hughes Spalding Children's Hospital

Children's Healthcare of Atlanta (CHOA) is a not-for-profit children's healthcare system located in the Atlanta area. It is dedicated to caring for infants, children, teens, and young adults age 0–21 throughout Georgia.

Children's formed in 1998 when Egleston Children's Health Care System and Scottish Rite Medical Center came together, becoming one of the largest pediatric systems in the United States. In 2006, Children's assumed responsibility for the management of services at Hughes Spalding Children's Hospital, growing the system to three hospitals.

== History ==
Children's is one of the few pediatric institutions in the nation that has existed for more than a century. Its origins date back to the founding of Scottish Rite Convalescent Home for Crippled Children in 1915, which consisted of two rented cottages with 20 patient beds. The Henrietta Egleston Hospital for Children opened in 1928, with 52 beds.

During the 1990s the United States healthcare industry changed dramatically. Hospitals throughout the country faced colliding pressures, such as reimbursement issues, insurance coverage changes and staff shortages. Egleston Children's Health Care System, which included the Henrietta Egleston Hospital for Children and Scottish Rite Medical Center were among the hospitals that had struggled to continue providing care for sick and injured children and their families. Both hospitals were faced with the possibility of closure; Atlanta leaders urged Egleston and Scottish Rite to unite to preserve pediatric healthcare for the region.

In 1998, the two hospitals merged to form Children's Healthcare of Atlanta. The new organization improved its standing immediately by eliminating redundancies and reducing costs. Children's went on to achieve even greater financial improvements, reaching $38 million in savings in just 24 months—when the original goal had been $30 million over a five-year period. In addition to exceeding the organization's original financial targets, Children's achieved new benchmarks for customer service and employee satisfaction.

In 2006, Children's assumed responsibility for the management of Hughes Spalding Children's Hospital. The transaction was facilitated by a $20 million donation from philanthropist Diana Blank. That same year, Children's launched a comprehensive, five-year campaign to raise funds for the largest proposed healthcare facility expansion and renovation project in the State of Georgia's history. Called the One to Grow on Campaign, the campaign raised a total of $294 million which surpassed the original goal of $265 million. The campaigns success was in part due to the generous support of the Atlanta area community.

In 2008, Children's launched the Strong4Life Clinic to help families struggling with health issues related to weight. The Strong4Life Clinic provides a specialized pediatric-trained team members, including a board-certified obesity medicine pediatrician, a dedicated pediatric psychologist as well as a staff of registered dietitians, exercise physiologists and other wellness experts. In 2022, Strong4Life reached more than 813,000 children through advocacy efforts.

In January 2010, Children's announced a $75 million investment in pediatric research centers of excellence over a five-year period, with a focus on the Aflac Cancer Center and Blood Disorders Service of Children's.

On September 29, 2024, Children's opened Arthur M. Blank Hospital. With the opening of the new 19-story, 2-million-square-foot facility, clinical services at Egleston Hospital moved to Arthur M. Blank Hospital.

== Arthur M. Blank Hospital ==
Children's Healthcare of Atlanta Arthur M. Blank Hospital is a freestanding, 446-bed, pediatric acute care children's hospital currently located at the corner of I-85 and North Druid Hills Road in Brookhaven, Georgia. The hospital provides comprehensive pediatric care to infants, children, teens, and young adults ages 0–21, and features a level I pediatric trauma center. Its regional pediatric intensive care unit and neonatal intensive care unit (NICU) serves the Atlanta and greater Georgia region. Arthur M. Blank Hospital opened Sep. 29, 2024, and is the largest healthcare project in Georgia's history.

== Center for Advanced Pediatrics ==
One of the first buildings to open on the North Druid Hills campus, the Center for Advanced Pediatrics is an outpatient clinic that was built as a part of phase 1 of the construction plan. The 260,000 ft building opened July 24, 2018. The facility offers more than 20 different pediatric specialties and clinics. The Center for Advanced Pediatrics is not a hospital and does not provide emergency, urgent care or other walk-in services.

== Marcus Autism Center ==
As one of the largest autism centers in the U.S., Marcus Autism Center offers families access to the latest research, comprehensive testing and science-based treatments. What started as an act of compassion for local children with autism by Bernie Marcus, is today one of the country's largest clinical centers for pediatric autism. After realizing the difference the center was making for kids with autism, Children's saw potential to combine efforts to provide top-quality healthcare to all children. In 2008, Marcus Autism Center became a part of Children's. Through collaboration with Children's and Emory University, the transformative work at Marcus is known throughout the nation and world.

== Awards ==
Since 2005, U.S. News & World Report has ranked Children's among the nation's top pediatric hospitals. For 2025–2026, Children's has one specialty ranked in the top 10 and seven specialties ranked in the top 20.

Specialty	Rank (In the U.S.)
Cancer Program (Aflac Cancer and Blood Disorders Center)	#13
Cardiology & Heart Surgery Program	#14
Gastroenterology & GI Surgery Program	#15
Nephrology Program	#17
Neurology & Neurosurgery Program	#19
Orthopaedics Program	#9
Pulmonology & Lung Surgery Program	#20
Urology Program	#20

Emory University School of Medicine Department of Pediatrics, the primary academic partner of Children's Healthcare of Atlanta, is the largest recipient of federal research dollars from the National Institutes of Health (NIH) in 2022 for pediatrics departments, according to rankings from the Blue Ridge Institute for Medical Research. The 2022 figures show the pediatrics department ranking No. 1, for the second time in three years. The program has maintained a top five ranking since 2016, up from No. 49 in 2004.

In addition to $77 million in NIH grant funding that led to the second No. 1 ranking, more than 2,200 publications in more than 1,000 journals in the same time period helped support groundbreaking efforts to develop new treatments or cures in 50 specialty areas.

== Community Events ==
The Children's Christmas Parade was a major community event to benefit Children's. Beginning in 1981 with Egleston Children's Hospital (which later merged with Scottish Rite Children's Hospital), it was held on the first Saturday in December, which is also the second weekend after Thanksgiving.

=== Cape Day ===
Cape Day is an annual tradition, which began in 2013. Held each October, the event encourages the community to honor and celebrate the strong and resilient patients facing illnesses and injuries at Children's. On the designated day, patients, employees, schools, organizations and communities across the state are encouraged to wear a cape, as well as share videos and photos, tagged with #CapeDayATL.

=== Special camps/retreats ===
Children'soffers numerous specialized camps and retreats that bring together children and teens with similar medical conditions, diseases, and disabilities. Some of these include the whole family. The goal of each camp is to give patients the opportunity to have fun, meet others with similar conditions and build confidence. The majority of these outings are held at Camp Twin Lakes, which operates several camp locations throughout the Georgia.

- Camp Braveheart – An overnight camp for children and teens that have had a heart transplant or are affected by heart disease
- Camp Carpe Diem – An overnight camp for children with medically controlled epilepsy and other seizure disorders
- Camp Courage – An overnight camp for children with craniofacial disorders
- Camp Crescent Moon – A sleepaway camp for kids with sickle cell disease
- Camp Krazy Legs – An overnight summer camp for children and teens with spina bifida
- Camp No Limb-itations – An overnight camp for children and teens with amputations or limb deficiencies
- Camp Independence – A week-long summer camp for children and teens who have been diagnosed with kidney disease, are on dialysis or have received an organ transplant
- Camp Strong4Life – An overnight healthy habits camp for kids ages 8 to 12 with a BMI greater than the 85th percentile
- Camp Thal Pal – A weekend getaway for families of children with thalassemia
- Camp You B You – A sleepaway camp for kids with autism who are verbally fluent and can complete self-care skills independently (there's also a weekend getaway camp for families of children with autism)
- Camp Wishbone – A weekend getaway for families of children with osteogenesis imperfecta (OI)
- Second Chance Family Camp – A fall weekend getaway for transplant recipients, candidates and their families
- Teen Retreat – A weekend camp for teenagers with transplants, kidney disease or congenital or acquired heart defects
- Camp on the Move provides intentional, therapeutic camp-themed activities to patients and siblings in hospitals and clinics across the Children'ssystem.
- Teen Leadership Academy is an interactive and informative program that combines monthly virtual workshops and in-person events to promote leadership, independence and self-care while building community for teens and young adults.

== See also ==
- List of children's hospitals in the United States
- Arthur M. Blank Hospital
- Emory University School of Medicine
- Hughes Spalding Children's Hospital
- Egleston Hospital
