= Scottish Rite Cathedral (Harrisburg, Pennsylvania) =

Masonic church building in Harrisburg, Pennsylvania

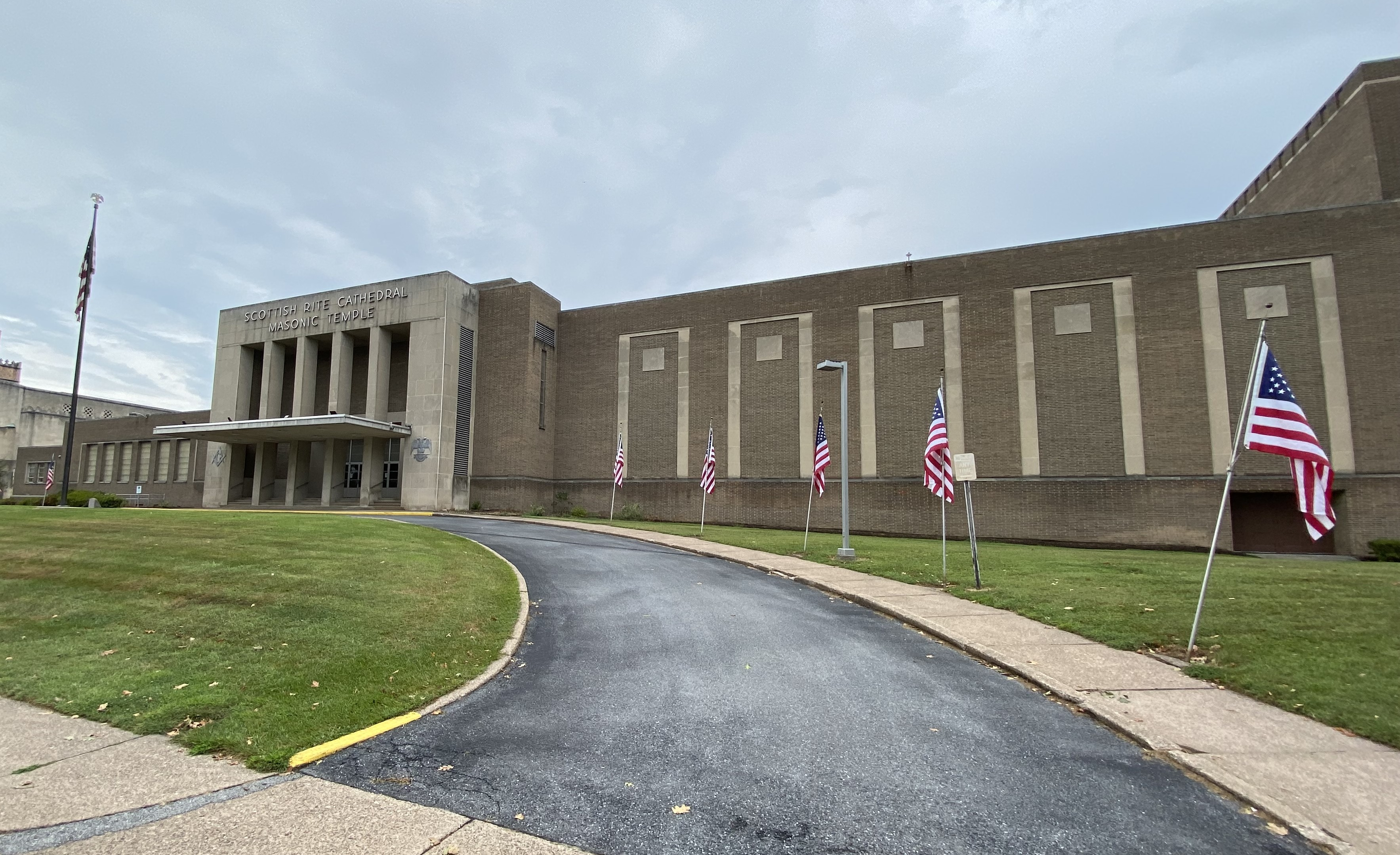
- Scottish Rite Cathedral in Harrisburg, PA
- Interactive map of the Scottish Rite Cathedral area

General information
- Type: Masonic building
- Location: 40.289552°N 76.899694°W, 2701 N. 3rd Street, Harrisburg, PA, USA
- Completed: 1954

Website
- Official website

The Scottish Rite Cathedral in Harrisburg, Pennsylvania is a Masonic building located at 2701 N. Third St. in Harrisburg. It is home to the Valley of Harrisburg Consistory and concordant Scottish Rite Bodies, several Masonic “Blue Lodges”, York Rite bodies, and Masonic Youth groups.

The "Theatre at the Scottish Rite Cathedral" was utilized in the "Harrisburg Arts Alive!" program. The Cathedral continues to be used today for wedding receptions, banquets, shows, and hosts free schooling for dyslexic children.
