= Georgia's Own Credit Union =

Credit union in Georgia, US

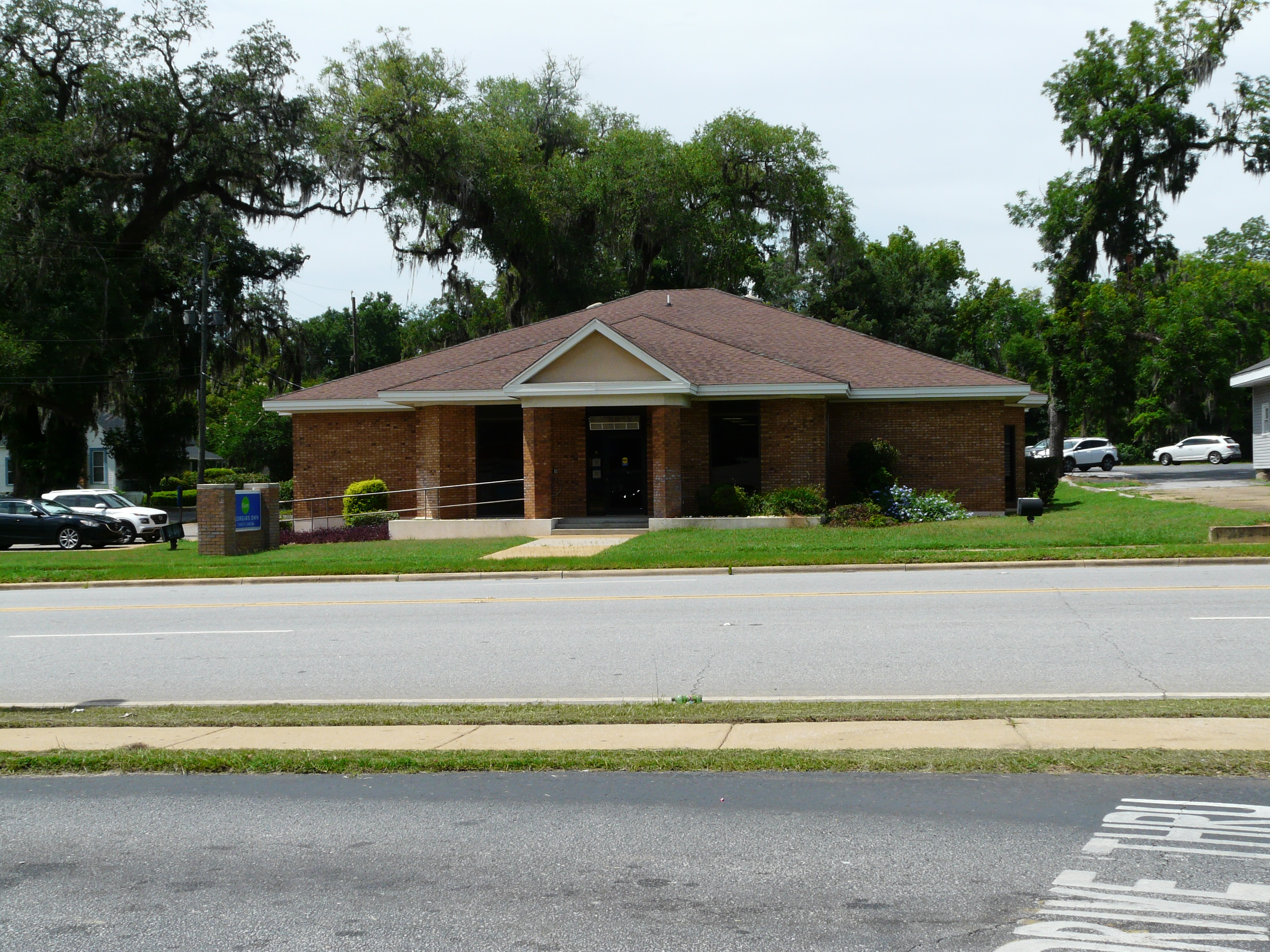
Location in Bainbridge, Georgia

Georgia's Own Credit Union is a credit union based in Atlanta, Georgia that was founded in 1934.

Georgia's Own Credit Union is the 3rd largest credit union in Georgia with over 240,000 members and assets of $4.38 billion as of May 2026. They operate 30 branch locations in Georgia. Georgia's Own provides its members access to over 30,000 surcharge-free ATMs. In addition, Georgia's Own Credit Union belongs to the CO-OP Network which gives its members access to 5,000 Shared Branch locations. The organization is a federally insured credit union that is regulated by the National Credit Union Administration (NCUA).

== History ==
Georgia's Own Credit Union (formerly Atlanta Telco Credit Union) was founded on December 6, 1934, by eight telephone employees with an initial $160 investment. Over nine decades, it has grown into one of Georgia's largest credit unions, offering a wide array of products, expanding its statewide charter, and surpassing $4 billion in assets.

The financial institution's growth and operational milestones include:

- 1934: The institution opened in Atlanta under the name Atlanta Telco Credit Union.
- 1944: Membership was expanded to include all telephone employees throughout the state of Georgia, and the institution changed its name to Georgia Telco Credit Union.
- 1976: The first branch location opened at 125 Perimeter Center in the Atlanta suburb of Sandy Springs.
- 1977: Then-CEO Eloise Woods was appointed Chairperson of the National Credit Union Administration (NCUA) by President Jimmy Carter.
- 1984: The credit union celebrated its 50th anniversary and introduced checking accounts, certificates of deposit (CDs), individual retirement accounts (IRAs), home equity loans, and credit cards.
- 1987: The company merged with Savannah-Chatham Federal Credit Union, opening its first two branches outside of the metropolitan Atlanta region.
- 1999: Charlotte Ayers was named President and CEO following Eloise Woods' retirement after 52 years of service.
- 2005: Total assets grew to $1 billion. A change in state banking law enabled the institution to expand membership to 12 Georgia counties and more than 400 Select Employee Groups.
- 2007: The organization rebranded from Georgia Telco to Georgia’s Own Credit Union.
- 2010: David Preter succeeded Charlotte Ayers as President and CEO upon her retirement.
- 2017: Georgia's Own Credit Union relocated its headquarters to 100 Peachtree, the building formerly known as the Equitable Building in Downtown Atlanta.
