= Children's Healthcare of Atlanta at Egleston =

- Children's Healthcare of Atlanta

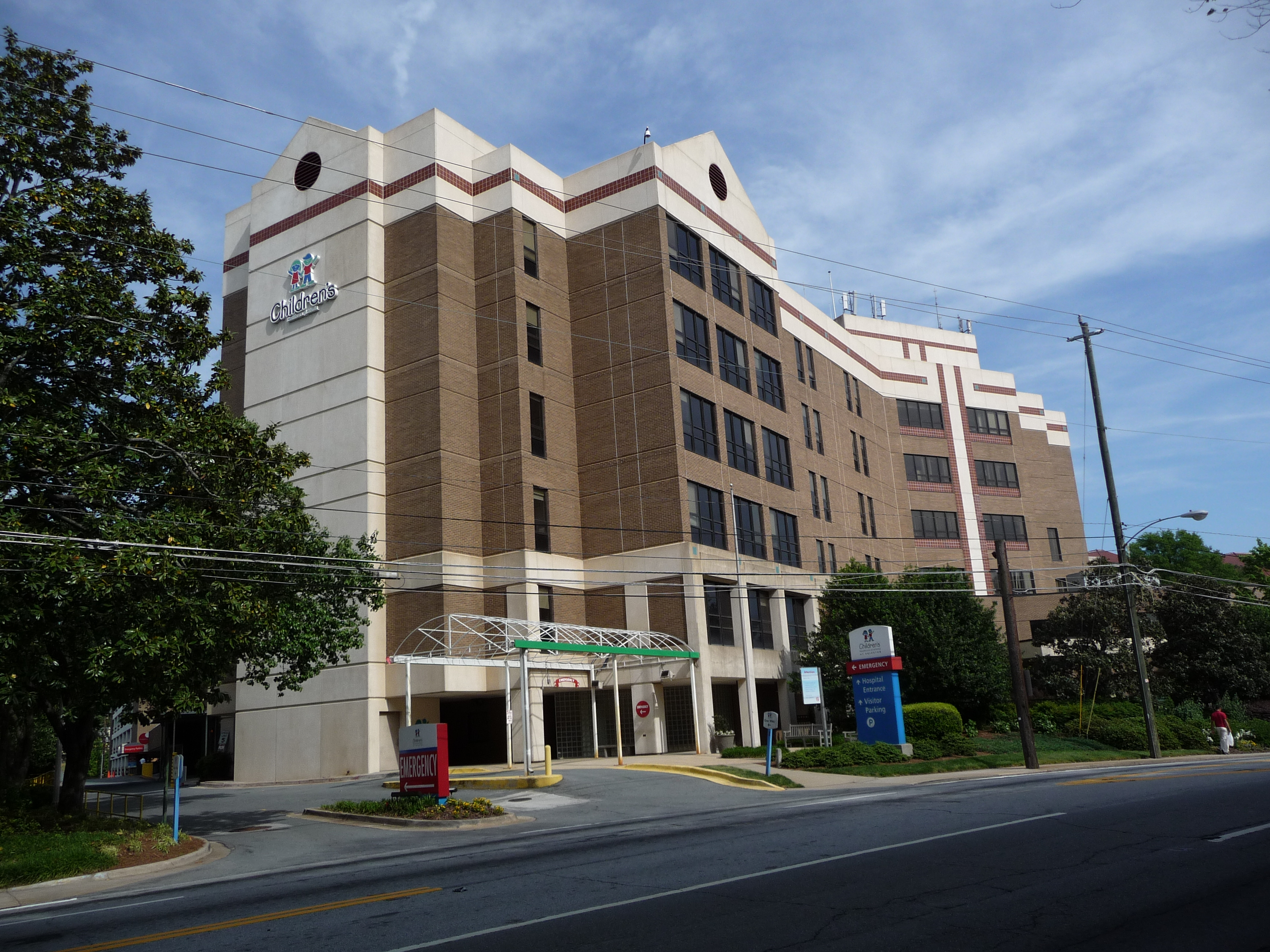
- Egleston

Geography
- Location: Atlanta, Georgia, USA
- Coordinates: 33.7941°N 84.3203°W

Organisation
- Type: General
- Network: Children's Healthcare of Atlanta

History
- Founded: 1928
- Closed: September 29, 2024

Links
- Website: http://www.choa.org
- Lists: Hospitals in the United States

Children's Healthcare of Atlanta (Children's) Egleston Hospital is a former hospital facility in Atlanta.

On September 29, 2024, clinical services, including the Emergency Department, at Children's Healthcare of Atlanta (Children's) Egleston Hospital moved to Arthur M. Blank Hospital.

The future of the Egleston campus has yet to be determined.

== History ==
In 1928, Henrietta Egleston Hospital for Children opened in the Old Fourth Ward east of downtown Atlanta at 640 Forrest Avenue (now Ralph McGill Blvd.). It opened with the financial support of Thomas R. Egleston Jr. In the first year that the 52-bed facility was open, 605 children were treated. The original hospital site was on the north side of Forrest Avenue (now Ralph McGill Blvd.) on the east side of Fortune St. (today Wabash Ave.). Today the AMLI Parkside apartments occupy the site.

The hospital contained the original Dolly Blalock Black Memorial Garden, dedicated to Elizabeth "Dolly" Blalock, wife of Eugene R. Black, Sr., president of the World Bank.

In the 1950s, Egleston became the pediatric teaching hospital affiliate for the Emory University School of Medicine, and in 1959 relocated to the university's campus. A prominent local and women's rights activist Ella Lillian Wall Van Leer played an important role at the hospital as its trustee, President of the Auxiliary department and Director of Volunteers until 1976.

This hospital saw further expansions through the years, including the opening of the George and Irene Woodruff Pavilion Oct. 14, 1981, and the addition of 70 beds in 1993. The 1990s saw major growth, with the establishment of the Center for Child Advocacy in 1992, the Aflac Cancer and Blood Disorders Center in 1995 and the Sibley Heart Center in 1997.

The hospital became a part of Children's, which formed in 1998 when Egleston Children's Health Care System and Scottish Rite Medical Center came together, becoming one of the largest pediatric systems in the United States.

Old Rainbow Logo of Egleston prior to 1998 merger becoming Children's Healthcare of Atlanta

The City of Atlanta annexed the hospital site effective January 1, 2018. The health system had requested that the Atlanta city government annex the area including Egleston Hospital. Previously the headquarters were in an unincorporated area, statistically counted in the Druid Hills census-designated place.

On September 29, 2024, Children's opened Arthur M. Blank Hospital. With the opening of the new 19-story, 2-million-square-foot facility, clinical services and patients at Egleston moved to Arthur M. Blank Hospital.

== Awards ==
In June 2023, Egleston achieved Magnet recognition again for its continued dedication to nursing excellence. Conferred by the American Nurses Credentialing Center (ANCC), the world's largest and most prestigious nurse credentialing organization, Magnet Recognition Program designation is the highest international distinction a healthcare organization can receive for nursing care.

In October 2023, the American Academy of Pediatrics (AAP) and Georgia Department of Public Health (DPH) verified the Egleston Neonatal Intensive Care Unit (NICU) as a Level IV Neonatal Center—the first to receive this designation in the state of Georgia.

== See also ==
- List of children's hospitals in the United States
- Arthur M. Blank Hospital
- Emory University School of Medicine
- Scottish Rite Medical Center
- Hughes Spalding Children's Hospital
- Children's Healthcare of Atlanta
