= Festival of Trees =

Christmas fundraising event

Festival of Trees is the name taken by a number of (apparently independent) charity events/organizations that hold annual events around Christmas time to raise money for some local charity many for children hospitals and other organizations (often, but not always, a hospital or more specifically, a children's hospital). These events seem to be becoming more common in North America as of this writing and are centered on the decoration and display of Christmas trees.

The general outline of the event is as follows, although details may vary from location to location.

- Sponsors are obtained who agree to cover costs of advertising, hiring a hall or convention center, obtaining undecorated trees (or wreaths or other traditional holiday decorations) or the cost of a particular tree's decorations, producing a program, or covering other costs.
- Designers are engaged to decorate/design the trees. Often elaborate theming is employed. Sometimes clubs, schools or other organizations participate as well as professional designers.
- The hall is opened to the designers or organizations who decorate and arrange the trees.
- The hall is opened to the general public, often for an admission charge. The public may be able to bid or buy raffle tickets for the trees or other decorations, or for prizes also donated. (typically one of the event goals is to sell every tree that is on display)
- At some point there may be a black tie gala for contributors or supporters. Presentations about the charity supported are often made.
- The event usually gets much local media attention before and during the public visitation period
- There may be other attractions such as children's play areas, craft areas, visits with Santa and so forth
- The event winds down and the purchasers of the trees pick them up or make arrange for delivery

Depending on the size of the municipality where the Festival of Trees is held, there may be several hundred trees of all sizes on display, and the amounts raised can be in the millions of USD.

== See also ==
- Riverside, California - Festivals & Events
