= CHOA Arthur M. Blank Hospital =

Hospital in Georgia, United States

Children's Healthcare of Atlanta Arthur M. Blank Hospital
- Children's Healthcare of Atlanta

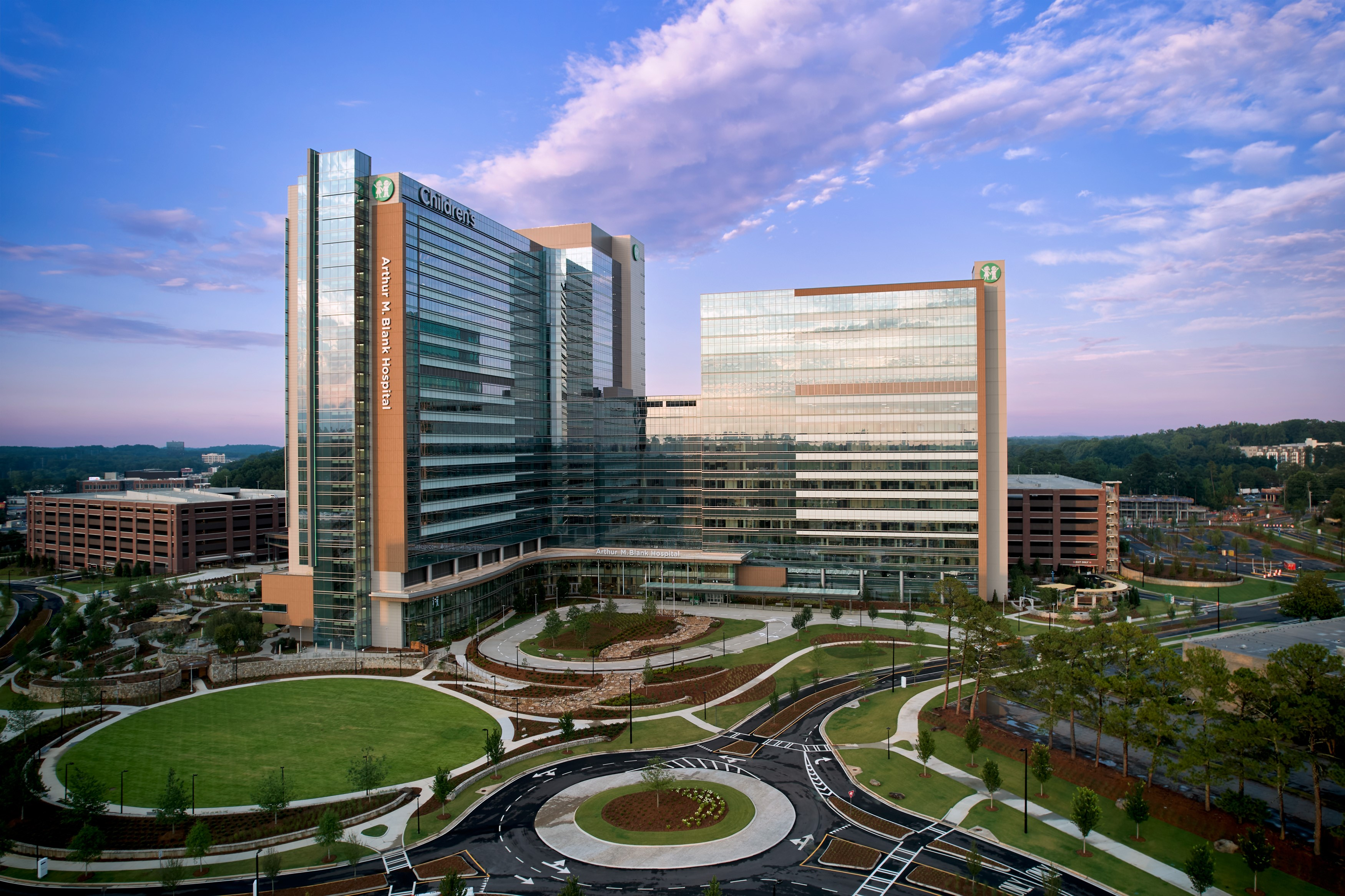

Geography
- Location: I-85 and North Druid Hills Road, Brookhaven, Georgia, USA
- Coordinates: 33.830938°N 84.330371°W

Organisation
- Type: Children's hospital
- Affiliated university: Emory University School of Medicine
- Network: Children's Healthcare of Atlanta

Services
- Emergency department: Level 1 Pediatric Trauma Center
- Beds: 446

Helipads
- Helipad: Yes

History
- Founded: 2024

Links
- Website: http://www.choa.org
- Lists: Hospitals in the United States

Children's Healthcare of Atlanta Arthur M. Blank Hospital is a 446-bed children's hospital that opened September 29, 2024. Located at the northeastern corner of North Druid Hills and I-85 in Brookhaven, Georgia, the 19-story, 2-million-square-foot facility features a Level I Trauma Center. With an Emergency Department, state-of-the-art operating rooms, infusion center and advanced diagnostic equipment, Arthur M. Blank Hospital is home to many pediatric clinical specialties, including cardiac, cancer and blood disorders, critical care, lab, transplant and more. Its regional pediatric intensive care unit (PICU) and neonatal intensive care units (NICU) serve the Atlanta and greater Georgia region.

Arthur M. Blank Hospital also offers more than 20 acres of greenspace to allow for exposure to nature and healing views from patient rooms.

== History ==
Children's announced its plans to include a pediatric hospital at its new campus at North Druid Hills Road, February 9, 2017.

Arthur M. Blank Hospital and the attached South Tower with outpatient clinics will join the Center for Advanced Pediatrics, a Support Center and more than 20 acres of green space at Children’s North Druid Hills campus.

In 2020, the project received a $200 million donation from the Arthur M. Blank Family Foundation, the largest donation in Children’s history. It is also the single largest naming gift to a freestanding pediatric hospital.

In January 2020, Georgia Power Foundation made a $15 million donation to help with construction of the new campus.

In early 2020, workers started clearing the land that would be used to construct Arthur M. Blank Hospital.

In May 2022, construction crews completed the highest point of the building's structure.

In November 2023, Children’s announced that Arthur M. Blank Hospital will open September 29, 2024.

On September 29, 2024, Children's opened Arthur M. Blank Hospital. With the opening of the new hospital, clinical services at Egleston Hospital, as well as the Aflac Cancer and Blood Disorders Centers on the Scottish Rite campus, moved to Arthur M. Blank Hospital. Hughes Spalding and Scottish Rite Hospitals both remain open to serve the community.

Arthur M. Blank Hospital is the largest healthcare project in the history of Georgia.

== See also ==
- List of children's hospitals in the United States
- Egleston Hospital
- Children's Healthcare of Atlanta
- Emory University
