= Scottish Rite for Children =

Coordinates: 32.80222°N 96.81410°W

Geography
- Location: 2222 Welborn Street, Dallas, Texas, United States

Organization
- Type: Specialist
- Affiliated university: UT Southwestern Medical Center

Services
- Beds: 100
- Speciality: Pediatric Orthopedic

Links
- Website: scottishriteforchildren.org
- Lists: Hospitals in Texas

Scottish Rite for Children, located in Dallas, is a pediatric hospital specializing in the treatment of orthopedic conditions and sports injuries, as well as certain related arthritic and neurological disorders and learning disorders, such as dyslexia.

== Hospital details ==
Scottish Rite for Children opened its doors to the children of Texas in 1921. One of Dallas's first orthopedic surgeons, W. B. Carrell, M.D., was approached by a group of Texas Masons who recognized a growing need to provide superior medical care to children suffering from polio regardless of the family's ability to pay. With the introduction of the Salk and Sabin vaccines in the mid-1950s, which virtually eradicated polio in the Western Hemisphere, the hospital broadened its focus to other orthopedic conditions. The hospital was originally called Dallas Scottish Rite Hospital for Crippled Children.

Scottish Rite for Children treats thousands of children for orthopedic conditions, including scoliosis, club foot, congenital dislocated hip, Legg-Perthes, limb-length differences and hand conditions, as well as children with sports injuries.

The Sarah M. and Charles E. Seay Center for Musculoskeletal Research supports research at the hospital. Scottish Rite Hospital's research efforts have yielded discoveries such as the TSRH SILO 5.5 Spinal System, TRUE/LOK External Fixation System, and the first gene associated with idiopathic scoliosis.

Through the Luke Waites Center for Dyslexia and Learning Disorders, specific learning disorders, such as dyslexia, are evaluated and treated. Physicians hold faculty appointments at UT Southwestern Medical School.

Scottish Rite for Children is governed by a board of trustees, many who are members of the Scottish Rite of Freemasonry in Texas. Scottish Rite Masons are affiliated with Freemasonry, a worldwide fraternal organization. Financial support from the Scottish Rite or broader Masonic groups is on an individual basis.

In 2025 they ran three locations, one in Dallas and a further two in Frisco.
