= Candler Mansion =

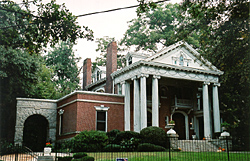
First Asa Griggs Candler (Senior) mansion in Inman Park, Atlanta

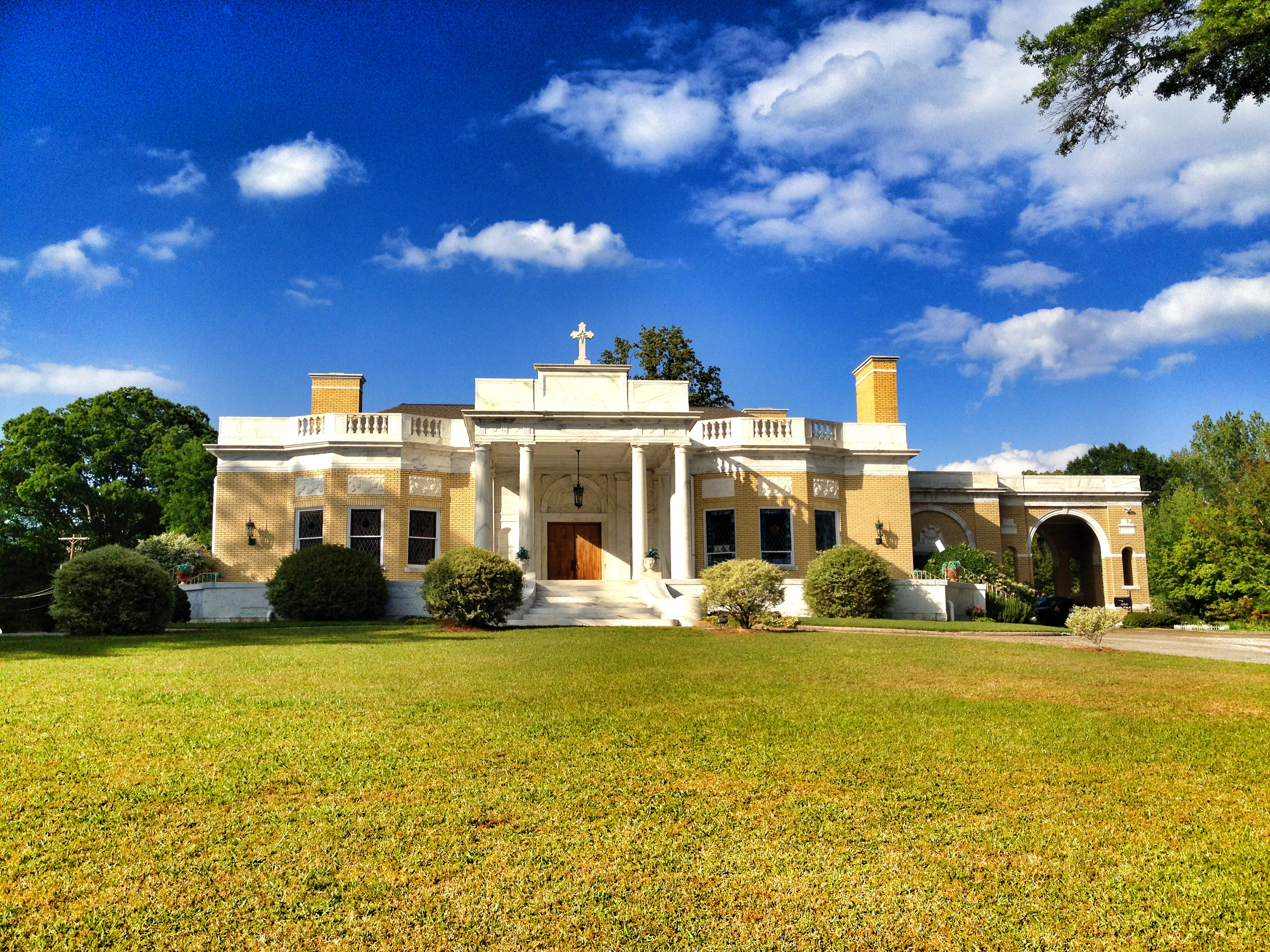
St. John's Chrysostom Melkite Church in Druid Hills, Atlanta, 2012, formerly the mansion of Asa Griggs Candler (Senior)

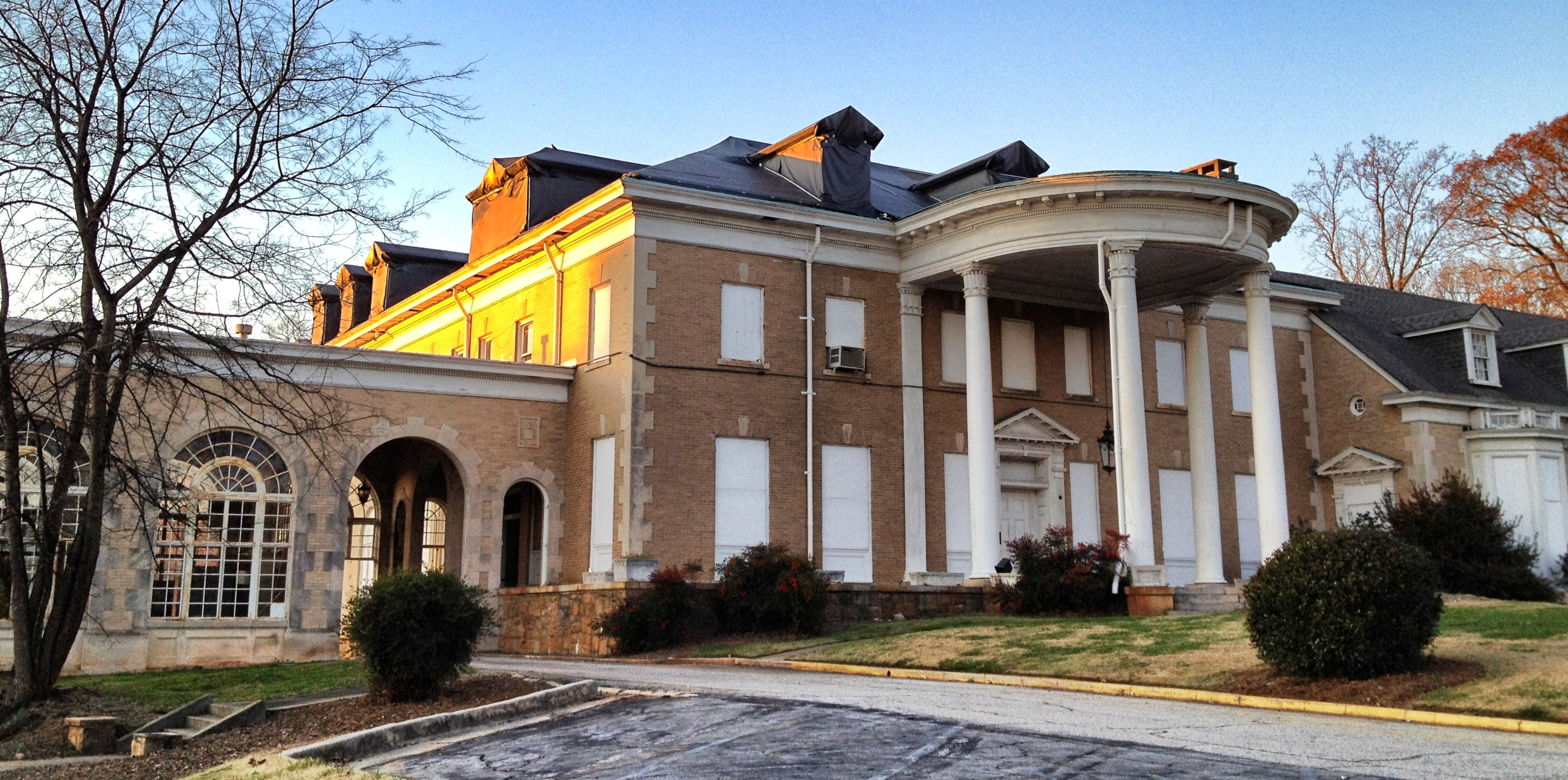
Briarcliff, Druid Hills, mansion of Asa G. Candler, Jr.

Candler Mansion may refer to:

- One of the former homes of Coca-Cola co-founder and Atlanta mayor Asa Griggs Candler:
  - his mansion Callan Castle in Inman Park, built 1902-1904 where he lived until 1916.
  - his mansion at 1500 Ponce de Leon Avenue in Druid Hills, built 1916, until his death in 1929. It is now the Saint John Chrysostom Melkite Greek Catholic Church.
- A home of one of Asa Griggs Candler's children:
  - "Callanwolde", the home of Charles Howard Candler from 1920 to 1959. After his death it was donated to Emory University, and was subsequently sold to First Christian Church. It was sold to DeKalb County in 1972 and now a fine arts center.
  - "Briarcliff", the home of Asa G. Candler, Jr., was built from 1920 to 1922. It was sold in 1948 and was supposed to become a veterans hospital, and in 1953 became the Georgian Clinic, the first alcohol rehab center in Georgia. From 1965 to 1997, the estate housed the Georgia Mental Health Institute. It is now part of the Briarcliff Campus of Emory University and sits vacant.
  - "Lullwater House", originally the home of Walter T. Candler, built in 1926 on the campus of Emory University. Candler sold the mansion to Emory University in 1958 and since 1963 it has served as the President's Mansion at Emory University.
  - "Lullwater Estate" originally known as "Rainbow Terrace", located at 1610 Ponce de Leon Avenue, was the home of Lucy Candler Heinz. After her death it was divided into condominiums, and is now surrounded by townhouses, all together forming a complex.
