= Paramount Theatre (Atlanta) =

Movie palace in Atlanta, Georgia

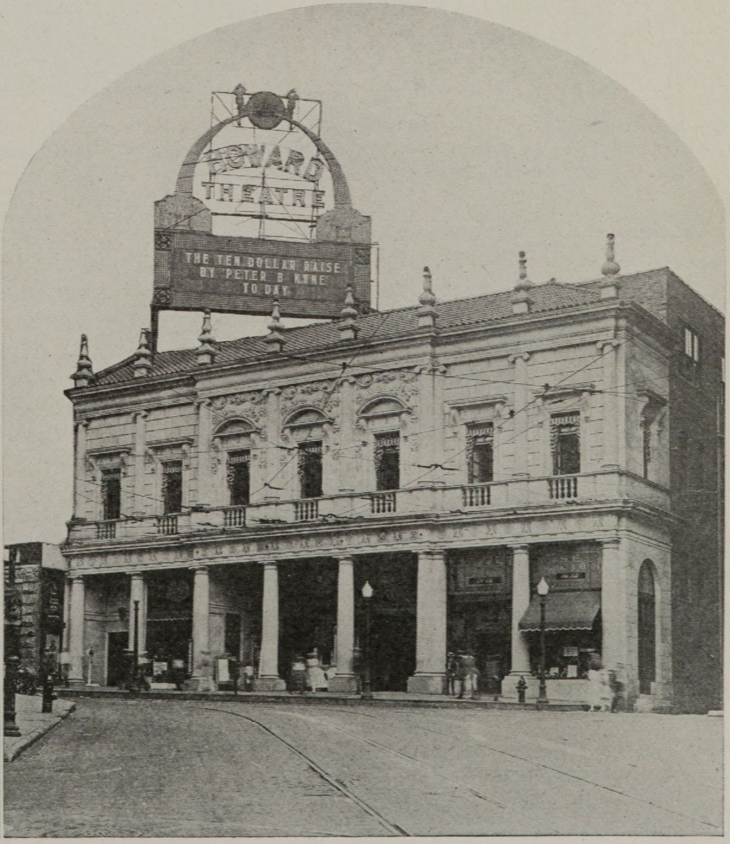
- The Howard Theatre in 1924
- Interactive map of the Paramount Theatre area
- Former names: Howard Theatre (1920–1929)

General information
- Status: Demolished
- Type: Movie palace
- Architectural style: Italian Renaissance
- Location: 169 Peachtree Street NE, Atlanta, Georgia, United States
- Coordinates: 33°45′28.5″N 84°23′14.5″W
- Construction started: 1919
- Opened: December 1920
- Demolished: 1960
- Cost: US$1,000,000

Design and construction
- Architect: Philip T. Shutze
- Architecture firm: Hentz, Reid & Adler

Other information
- Seating capacity: 2,700

The Paramount Theatre was a movie palace in Downtown Atlanta, Georgia, United States. The building was designed by Philip T. Shutze and was completed in 1920 as the Howard Theatre, a name it kept until 1929. It was located at 169 Peachtree Street, in an area that soon became the location of several other major theaters, earning it the nickname "Broadway of the South". With a seating capacity of 2,700, it was at the time the second largest movie theater in the world, behind only the Capitol Theatre in New York City. In addition to functioning as a movie theater, the building hosted live performances, with several nationally renowned orchestras playing at the venue through the 1940s and Elvis Presley playing at the theater in 1956. By the 1950s, however, movie palaces faced increased competition from smaller movie theaters and the rise in popularity of television, and the Paramount was demolished in 1960.

== History ==
=== Background and construction ===
The 1 acre (0.40 ha) of land in downtown Atlanta on which the theater would eventually be built traded hands several times throughout the late 1800s before it was sold to Asa Griggs Candler for $97,000 on November 30, 1909. Candler sold the land on April 17, 1911, to brothers Forrest and George W. Adair Jr. for $120,000. On March 28, 1919, the Adairs agreed to lease the land to C. B. and George Troup Howard, the latter of whom was a successful cotton merchant. The lease was granted on the condition that a theater be built on the property, which at this time had a valuation of $625,000. The theater's value, including its equipment, was to be greater than $250,000. At the end of the 25-year lease, the property, including the theater, would revert to the Adairs. Prior to the theater's construction, several one-story commercial stores were located on the property.

The design of this new building, to be called the Howard Theatre, was handled by the Atlanta-based architectural firm of Hentz, Reid & Adler, with Philip T. Shutze serving as the building's architect. (Note: The actual architect responsible for the building's design has been the subject of some debate. Articles in the Atlanta Historical Society's official publication have differed, with either Neel Reid or Shutze (both architects for Hentz, Reid & Adler) cited as the building's architect. In a 1986 article on Shutze, historian Elizabeth Meredith Dowling states that the Italian-inspired architecture of the building points to Shutze as the designer, as he had recently spent time studying architecture in Rome before returning to work in Atlanta. Additionally, a letter written during the time of the theater's construction from Allyn Cox to his mother makes mention of Shutze's work on a theater design that is most likely in reference to the Howard Theatre. Furthermore, a 2017 article published in The Atlanta Journal-Constitution states that Shutze was the architect for the theater.) He drew up the designs in 1919 and construction started shortly thereafter. Construction costs for the project reached roughly $1 million, which was considered a monumental sum for a theater at this time. Upon completion, the building and its equipment were valued at over $750,000, far exceeding the terms set in the lease. While an August 1920 issue of The City Builder (published by the Atlanta Chamber of Commerce) stated that the theater would be open by October 1, 1920, it was not open to the public until early December of that year.

=== Theater in operation ===
Upon its opening, the theater was well received by the general public. Contemporary publications in the city called it one of the "show spots of the city" and the "wonder theater of the South", while historian Franklin Garrett later called the building "by far the most palatial movie house ever erected in the city". The construction of the Howard was considered the start of a major boom of movie palaces in the city, with the Metropolitan Theater, which had been under construction at the same time as the Howard, opening shortly afterwards. The Howard had been built along Peachtree Street near Loew's Grand Theatre, an area which soon became known as the "Broadway of the South" in reference to the numerous theaters there.

As a performing arts venue, the theater hosted the Atlanta Symphony Orchestra during their inaugural 1923 season, and the 35-piece orchestra was led by conductor Enrico Leide. In April 1921, the theater hosted actress Clara Kimball Young, who was promoting her new film Straight from Paris, and in August 1923, it hosted a memorial service for recently deceased United States President Warren G. Harding. In 1929, the theater was renamed the Paramount Theatre, and the following year Paramount Interests, which had become the owner of the theater, announced a $100,000 renovation of the building. Over the next several decades, the theater remained a major venue for the city. In 1940, The Salvation Army held a meeting there that saw former General Evangeline Booth as the guest of honor, alongside other guests such as Clark Howell, the editor of The Atlanta Constitution, and Georgia Governor Eurith D. Rivers. Throughout the decade, the theater hosted numerous nationally renowned orchestras, and between June 22 and 24, 1956, Elvis Presley performed ten shows at the theater. However, by this time, the grand movie palaces in Atlanta, as in other cities across the United States, were facing increased competition from smaller movie theaters in suburban areas and from the rise in popularity of television. As a result, several of Atlanta's landmark movie theaters were demolished in the latter half of the 20th century. The Paramount was one of these, being demolished in 1960 and replaced by a 12-story building.

== Architecture ==
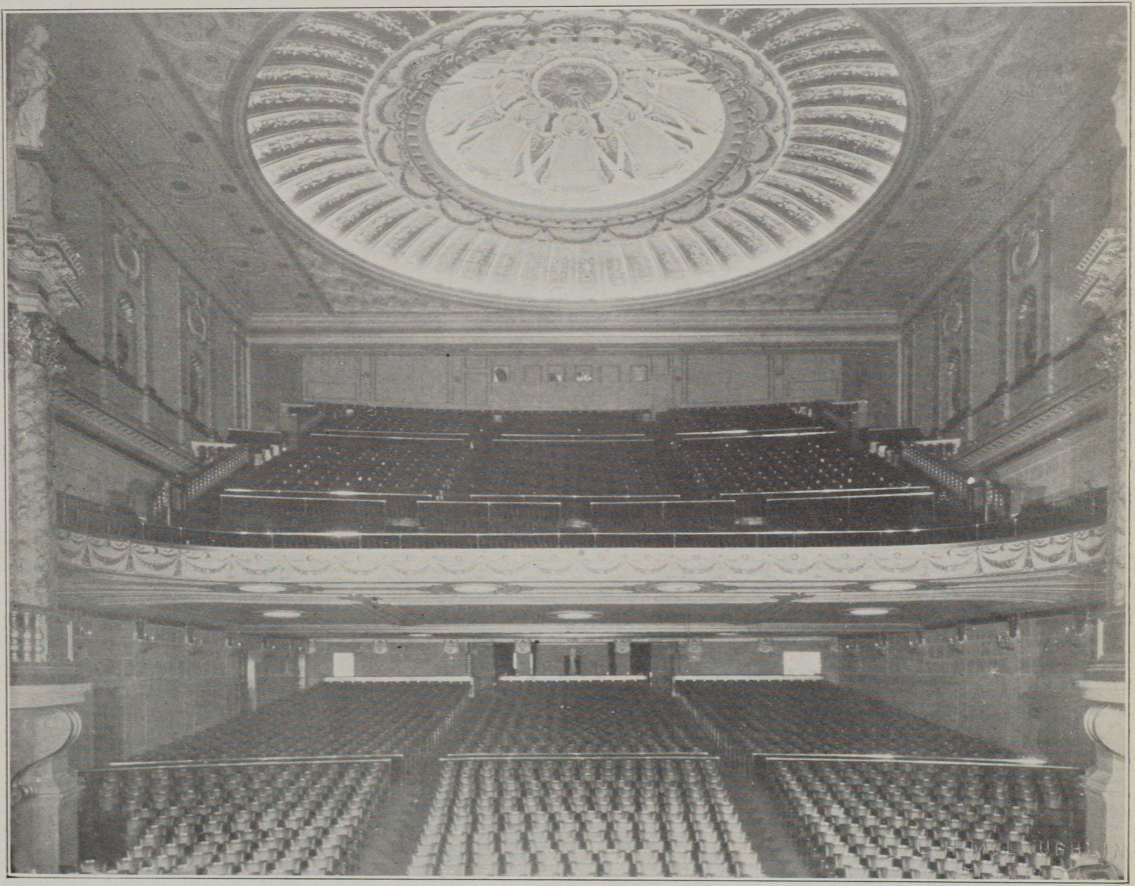
Auditorium of the theater, 1921

The theater building had dimensions of 90 feet (27 m) by 275 feet (84 m). It was located along Peachtree Street, near its intersection with Forsyth Street, and the building stretched the entire length of the city block it sat on, having a backside abutting Ivy Street. It was located next to the Hotel Aragon and was across the street from the Davison-Paxon-Stokes flagship department store. Both the Peachtree and Ivy sides of the building had a frontage of about 90 feet (27 m). The building was designed in the Italian Renaissance style, with a facade modeled after the Palazzo Chiericati designed by Andrea Palladio. This building marked one of the first designs by Shutze to incorporate Italian influences. The building's facade was composed entirely of limestone, and the main entrance consisted of an arched opening measuring 35 feet (11 m) tall and 35 feet (11 m) wide. A large marquee was on the Peachtree entrance, which also hosted several small shops.

The interior of the theater was designed in the Italian Baroque style. The building had a large open lobby with a grand staircase that led to a mezzanine level that had restrooms and smoking rooms. The staircase and columns in the lobby area were constructed of marble. The auditorium area had no columns that could block viewing of the stage, which could hold up to 50 musicians. The stage was designed to host both live performances and motion pictures. The theater had a seating capacity of 2,700, which made it the largest theater in Atlanta and the second largest movie theater in the world, behind only the Capitol Theatre in New York City.

== Sources ==
- Barker, B. S. (May 1930). "What the Chamber of Commerce is Doing". The City Builder. Atlanta Chamber of Commerce: 24–27.
- Chapman, Ashton (November 1932). "Past Ten Years Were Atlanta's Greatest". The City Builder. Atlanta Chamber of Commerce: 17–18.
- "Two New Theatres for Atlanta". The City Builder. V (6). Atlanta Chamber of Commerce: 20. August 1920.
- "Howard Theatre Pleases Atlanta". The City Builder. V (12). Atlanta Chamber of Commerce: 17. February 1921.
- "Miss Young Entertained". The City Builder. VI (2). Atlanta Chamber of Commerce: 16. April 1921.
- "Howard Theatre Property". The City Builder. VI (5 & 6). Atlanta Chamber of Commerce: 18. July–August 1921.
- "Atlanta Pays Tribute to Harding". The City Builder. VIII (6). Atlanta Chamber of Commerce: 7. August 1923.
- "New Chamber of Commerce Members for September". The City Builder. XVII (5). Atlanta Chamber of Commerce: 13. October 10, 1933.
- Craig, Robert M. (1995). Atlanta Architecture: Art Deco to Modern Classic, 1929–1959. Foreword by Richard Guy Wilson (1st ed.). Gretna, Louisiana: Pelican Publishing Company. ISBN 978-1-4556-0044-1.
- Dowling, Elizabeth Meredith (Summer 1986). "Philip Trammell Shutze: A Study of the Influence of Academic Discipline on His Early Residential Design". The Atlanta Historical Journal. XXX (2). Atlanta Historical Society: 33–54.
- Garrett, Franklin M. (1969a). Atlanta and Environs: A Chronicle of Its People and Events, 1820s-1870s. Vol. I (1st ed.). Athens, Georgia: University of Georgia Press. ISBN 978-0-8203-3903-0.
- Garrett, Franklin M. (1969b). Atlanta and Environs: A Chronicle of Its People and Events, 1880s-1930s. Vol. II (1st ed.). Athens, Georgia: University of Georgia Press. ISBN 978-0-8203-3904-7.
- Johnston, Andy (August 15, 2016). "Which four Atlanta venues did Elvis play before his death?". The Atlanta Journal-Constitution. Cox Enterprises. ISSN 1539-7459. Archived from the original on February 19, 2021.
- Johnston, Andy (January 2, 2017). "Paramount had 40-year run on Peachtree". The Atlanta Journal-Constitution. Cox Enterprises. ISSN 1539-7459. Archived from the original on January 3, 2017.
- Jones, Raymond B. (October–November 1923). "What to See in Atlanta and Where to See It". The City Builder. VIII (8 & 9). Atlanta Chamber of Commerce: 26–27.
- Martin, Harold H. (1987). Atlanta and Environs: A Chronicle of Its People and Events, 1940s-1970s. Vol. III (1st ed.). Athens, Georgia: University of Georgia Press. ISBN 978-0-8203-3907-8.
- McCall, John Clark Jr. (Spring–Summer 1973). "The Roxy Theatre: Recollections of Vaudeville in Atlanta". The Atlanta Historical Bulletin. XVIII (1). Atlanta Historical Society: 21–26.
- McKinley, Edward H. (Winter 1990–1991). "Brass Bands and God's Work: One Hundred Years of the Salvation Army in Georgia and Atlanta". Atlanta History: A Journal of Georgia and the South. XXXIV (4). Atlanta Historical Society: 5–37.
- Sherry, Grace T. (Summer 1977). "Editorial". The Atlanta Historical Bulletin. XXI (2). Atlanta Historical Society: 7–9.
- Spain, Helen Knox (October–November 1923). "Atlanta Symphony Orchestra". The City Builder. VIII (8 & 9). Atlanta Chamber of Commerce: 10–11.
- Trotti, Lamar (November 1924). "The Marvelous Product of Twenty Years". The City Builder. Atlanta Chamber of Commerce: 11–15.
- Trotti, Lamar (February 1931). "Atlanta's "Film Row" Handles 1,600 Miles a Day". The City Builder. Atlanta Chamber of Commerce: 3–4, 39.
