= Walter T. Candler =

American banker, businessman, and horse breeder (1885–1967)

Personal information
- Born: Walter Turner Candler; October 5, 1885 Atlanta, Georgia, U.S.
- Died: April 23, 1967 (aged 81) Atlanta, Georgia, U.S.
- Resting place: Westview Cemetery
- Occupations: Banker; businessman; real estate developer; horse breeder; harness racing executive

Horse racing career
- Sport: Harness racing

Honors
- United States Harness Racing Hall of Fame (1976)

Significant horses
- Duke of Lullwater; Abbedale

Walter T. Candler (October 5, 1885 – April 23, 1967) was an American banker, businessman, real estate developer, horse breeder, and harness racing executive. He founded Lullwater Farm, where he bred notable Standardbred horses including Abbedale and Duke of Lullwater. He was inducted into the United States Harness Racing Hall of Fame in 1976.

== Early life ==
Walter Turner Candler was born on October 5, 1885 in Atlanta, Georgia, United States. He was the fourth child born to Lucy Elizabeth and Asa Griggs Candler, and their third son. His father, Asa Griggs Candler, was the founder of The Coca-Cola Company. He was raised in the wealthy Candler family alongside his brothers Charles Howard Candler, Asa G. Candler Jr., William Candler, and sister Lucy Beall Candler Owens Heinz Leide.

Candler studied at Emory University in Atlanta and was named president of the graduating class of 1907. He graduated with a Bachelor of Science degree.

== Career ==
=== Banking and business career ===
After graduating, Candler held a position as a bank cashier with the Central Bank & Trust Corporation in Atlanta. Around 1912, he received stock in the Coca-Cola Company from his father, Asa Candler Sr., who distributed the bulk of his holdings equally among his four sons and daughter. He and his siblings sold their share of the company in 1919, each receiving roughly $4 million. When his family sold their interests in Coca-Cola, he became more active in banking, textiles, and real estate. He was elected vice president of the Central Bank & Trust Corporation in 1920. He was serving as both cashier and vice president when the firm was sold to the Citizens & Southern National Bank in 1922.

The wealthy Atlanta banker later entered the cotton manufacturing industry. Candler was president of the Lullwater Manufacturing Company, which operated a textile mill in East Point, Georgia. The Lullwater Manufacturing Company began producing shirts under Candler's direction in 1924. Candler's foresight and financial backing brought the success of the Lullwater shirt, a blue work shirt marketed to laborers. The company became part of a consolidation with the Oak Knitting Company of Syracuse and Arcade in 1927. Under the reorganization, the Oak Knitting Company's New York plants were closed and Candler's Lullwater mill was reequipped to manufacture athletic garments, underwear, and sweaters. He became a director of the reorganized Oak Knitting Company of Georgia.

His other business interests included commercial real estate. Candler developed an automobile parking facility in Atlanta. He began planning the $600,000 multi-story garage at Houston and Ivy streets in 1925. The large parking garage was constructed as an addition to the Candler Building built by his father. He purchased a commercial building on Peachtree Street near Cain Street in December 1930 for $900,000. The property stood on the former site of the Adair Hotel and was part of a record $1.6 million real estate transaction. Years later, Candler's holdings included several properties on Peachtree and West Peachtree streets in Atlanta, which he sold to Ben J. Massell and associates in July 1946 for $1 million in cash.

=== Harness racing career ===
Beginning in the early 1920s, he trained his harness racing horses in Orlando and owned a home on the Isle of Sicily in Winter Park, Florida. His racing colors were red and gold based on his college fraternity colors.

Among the notable horses associated with his racing and breeding program was Abbedale. He owned the pacing stallion, which Walter R. Cox had raced during the 1922 season. Several horses from Candler's stable were placed with trainer John Thomas in February 1923, including three young pacers sired by Napoleon Direct and a full brother to Abbedale. Abbedale and another leading horse from the Candler stable were retained by W. R. Cox. Candler continued to build his racing and breeding stock, shipping seven mares to Kentucky in March 1923 for breeding to various stallions.

In March 1924, Candler purchased the entire crop of 19 yearlings by Peter the Great from Thomas R. Taggart's Laurel Hall Farm for a reported $55,000. Some were transferred to Candler's farm, while others were placed with trainers for preparation for harness racing. During the summer of 1924, several of his acquisitions were placed under the colt trainer Greely Winings at Laurel Hall Farm in Indianapolis. Candler opened Lullwater Farm to the public in June 1924 with a three-race program during the Presidents' Club annual outing, held on the farm's new half-mile track.

While John Thomas was Candler's head trainer, harness driver Nat Ray visited them in Toledo, Ohio, and urged them to buy Tarzan Grattan. Candler paid $6,500 for Tarzan Grattan, a son of Grattan Royal, from Robert Trench of Ontario on July 17, 1925. The next week, the Canadian-bred gelding guided by Nat Ray netted him $15,000 at the $25,000 American Pacing Derby at Kalamazoo on July 21, 1925. With the winnings, he spent $12,000 to buy Louis Direct, a three-year-old son of Braden Direct, from Frank P. Fox of Indianapolis on July 29, 1925. He took interest in the pacer following a victory at the Kalamazoo Grand Circuit meeting. The horse was sent to Nat Ray for training in preparation for the 1926 Grand Circuit stakes. In late October 1925, he engaged Fred Egan to manage the training of his horses at Lullwater Farm and campaign his stable on the Grand Circuit.

Candler served as racing secretary of the Lakewood Fairgrounds racetrack, when the annual Grand Circuit meeting was held in Atlanta in October 1925. He organized the inaugural program and supervised the preparation of the track. He was a steward of the Grand Circuit and a member of the Kentucky Trotting Horse Breeders Association of Lexington. When Atlanta was withdrawn from the Grand Circuit in 1926 following changes made by the Southeastern Fair Association, he was instrumental in bringing the city back onto the circuit. At the Grand Circuit stewards' annual meeting in 1927, he secured a week of racing in Atlanta. He was elected president of the Southeastern Fair Association by the Atlanta Chamber of Commerce in February 1929. The association organized Atlanta's annual fair held at Lakewood Fairgrounds.

He served as an original director of the Hambletonian Society, which in 1924 announced plans for the inaugural $50,000 Hambletonian Stakes for three-year-old trotters, to be held in 1926. He worked on the managing committee of the Hambletonian Society. With Greeley Winings and A. J. Crawford, he awarded the 1927 stake to the New York State Fair. He became the first vice president of the Hambletonian Society but declined to seek the presidency in 1931.

In Lexington in 1950, Candler engaged John F. Simpson Sr. to select a promising colt sired by Volomite. The colt, purchased for $8,500, was registered as Duke of Lullwater. Candler's Duke of Lullwater was trained at Ben White Raceway throughout the 1950s. His string of horses were part of the public stable trained by Simpson until the end of 1951. He reached an agreement with Simpson, who continued training Duke of Lullwater and drove the Candler-owned horse in the 1952 Hambletonian Stakes. After Simpson, the Candler string of horses were handled by Del Miller.

Candler later served as a trustee of the Hall of Fame of the Trotter, now known as the Harness Racing Museum & Hall of Fame.

=== Civic and policital activities ===
During the mid-1920s and 1930s, Candler expanded his involvement in Atlanta's civic affairs. He was named president of the board of trustees of the Good Samaritan Health Center in Atlanta in December 1926.

Through his ownership of the Candler Building parking garage, he became well versed in motor vehicle storage and parking. In December 1933, he was appointed to the National Motor Vehicle Storage and Parking Code Authority with the approval of President Franklin D. Roosevelt. Along with six other members, Candler helped to administer the code, collect statistical data, make recommendations, and conduct general planning. He resigned from the national vehicle code board in June 1934.

Candler was also active in local sports organizations. He was unanimously elected the first president of the newly formed Atlanta Lawn Tennis Association in 1935, which was established to organize tennis tournaments in Atlanta.

After establishing himself in Atlanta, he briefly pursued a political career. In 1943, he announced his candidacy for the Georgia House of Representatives from DeKalb County.

== Death ==
Walter T. Candler Sr. died on April 23, 1967 in Atlanta, Georgia, United States.

== Legacy ==
Candler's country estate, Lullwater House, constructed in 1926 by Ivey and Crook, stood on 185 acres of woods and fields surrounding a man-made lake. His residence later became a part of Emory University when he sold the house and land in 1958.

W. T. Candler was inducted into the United States Harness Racing Hall of Fame in 1976.
