= Cobb's Legion =

Confederate Civil War regiment

- Georgia State flag prior to 1879
- Active: Summer 1861 – April 26, 1865
- Country: Confederate States of America
- Allegiance: Georgia
- Branch: Confederate States Army
- Type: Multiple Component Legion
- Nicknames: Georgia Legion; 9th Georgia Cavalry; Carlton's Troup Artillery
- Engagements: American Civil War

Commanders
- Notable commanders: Colonel Thomas R. R. Cobb

Cobb's Legion (also known as the Georgia Legion) was an American Civil War Confederate States Army unit that was raised from the state of Georgia by Thomas Reade Rootes Cobb during the summer of 1861. A legion in the Civil War usually meant a combined-arms unit, consisting of two or three branches of the military: infantry, cavalry, and artillery. When it was originally raised, the Georgia Legion comprised 600 infantrymen in the infantry battalions, 300 cavalry troopers in the cavalry battalions, and 100 artillerists in a single battery. The legion concept was not practical for Civil War armies and, soon after Robert E. Lee took command of the Army of Northern Virginia on June 1, 1862, the individual elements were assigned to other units.

== Infantry component ==
After the infantry battalion was brought up to regimental strength the unit was assigned to Howell Cobb's brigade in Lafayette McLaws's Division of James Longstreet's Corps of the Army of Northern Virginia. Howell Cobb was absent after the Battle of Malvern Hill in July 1862 until August 1862 and again in October 1862 before moving to another command. T.R.R. Cobb, commander of the infantry component of the former legion, commanded Cobb's brigade in his brother's absence and took full command in November 1862. Cobb was succeeded in brigade command by Colonel William T. Wofford after Cobb was killed at the Battle of Fredericksburg. The regiment surrendered at Appomattox Court House on April 9, 1865. The cavalry became a regiment in Brigadier General Wade Hampton's brigade of Major General J. E. B. Stuart's division and kept the name of Cobb's Legion or the Georgia Legion.

=== Organization ===
- Staff
  - Colonel Thomas Reade Rootes Cobb. Cobb formed the legion in the late summer of 1861, and served as its colonel. Cobb served as a colonel until he was promoted to brigadier general on November 1, 1862. However, the promotion was not confirmed by the Confederate States Congress before Cobb's death. Cobb was killed at the Battle of Fredericksburg on December 13, 1862. Colonel William T. Wofford, then in command of the 18th Georgia Infantry Regiment which had been incorporated into Cobb's brigade, succeeded to command of the brigade after T.R.R. Cobb's death. Wofford was promoted to brigadier general on January 17, 1863 and served in Major General Lafayette McLaws's division, commanded after McLaws was relieved of command following the Siege of Knoxville in 1864 by Major General Joseph B. Kershaw. After the legion's components were separated, the highest rank in the infantry battalion was lieutenant colonel.
  - Lieutenant Colonel Jefferson Mirabeau Lamar (He was named Lieutenant Colonel on January 18, 1862. He was mortally wounded at the Battle of Crampton's Gap, Maryland, on September 14, 1862, and he died the next day.)
  - Lieutenant Colonel Luther Glenn (He was named lieutenant colonel on September 15, 1862. He retired on January 11, 1865.)

=== Companies ===
- A Company (Lamar Infantry) was formed in Newton County, Georgia.
- B Company (Bowdon Volunteers) was formed in Carroll County, Georgia.
- C Company (Stephens Rifles) was formed in DeKalb County, Georgia.
- D Company (Mell Rifles) was formed in Clarke County, Georgia.
- E Company (Poythress Volunteers) was formed in Burke County, Georgia.
- F Company (Carroll Boys) was formed in Carroll County, Georgia.
- G Company (Panola Guards) was formed in Morgan County, Georgia.

=== Battles ===
The infantry battalion fought in the following battles:

- Battle of Yorktown (1862) (April 1862)
- Battle at Lee's Mills (April 16, 1862)
- Seven Days Battles (June 25 – July 1, 1862)
- Battle of Malvern Hill (July 1, 1862)
- Battle of South Mountain (Crampton's Gap) (September 14, 1862)
- Battle of Antietam (September 17, 1862)
- Battle of Fredericksburg (December 11–15, 1862)
- Battle of Chancellorsville (May 1 – May 4, 1863)
- Battle of Gettysburg (July 1 – July 3, 1863)
- Battle of Chickamauga [not engaged] (September 19 – September 20, 1863)
- Third Battle of Chattanooga (September – November 1863)
- Siege of Knoxville (November–December 1863)
  - Battle of Fort Sanders
- Battle of the Wilderness (May 5 – May 6, 1864)
- Battle of Spotsylvania Court House (May 8 – May 21, 1864)
- Battle of North Anna (May 23 – May 26, 1864)
- Battle of Cold Harbor (June 1 – June 3, 1864)
- Siege of Petersburg (June 1864 – April 1865)
- Battle of Front Royal (August 16, 1864)
- Battle of Cedar Creek (October 19, 1864)
- Battle of Sayler's Creek (April 6, 1865)
- Battle of Appomattox Court House (April 9, 1865)

== Cavalry component ==
The cavalry battalion was expanded first to eight companies, then later to eleven companies before finally being decreased to ten companies. It was redesignated as the 9th Georgia Cavalry, but continued to be called Cobb's Legion or the Georgia Legion. It surrendered at Greensboro, North Carolina, on April 26, 1865.

=== Organization ===
- Staff
  - Colonel Pierce M. B. Young (He was named colonel on November 1, 1862. He was promoted to brigadier general in the fall of 1863.)
  - Colonel Gilbert Jefferson Wright (He was named colonel on October 23, 1863, and led the Legion until its surrender on April 26, 1865.)
  - Lieutenant Colonel William Gaston Delony (He was named major on May 23, 1862. He was promoted to lieutenant colonel on November 2, 1862.) On September 13, 1862, he assumed command of the cavalry battalion after Lieutenant Colonel Young was wounded. He remained second in command of the Legion until mortally wounded and captured at the Battle of Jack's Shop, Virginia, on September 22, 1863, dying on October 2, 1863, in the Stanton Hospital in Washington City as a POW.

=== Companies ===
- A Company (Richmond Hussars, A Company) was formed in Richmond County, Georgia. This company was one of the original cavalry companies.
- B Company (Fulton Dragoons, A Company) was formed in Fulton County, Georgia. This company was one of the original cavalry companies.
- C Company (Georgia Troopers, A Company) was formed in Clarke County, Georgia. Members of the company were from Clarke, Hall, Jackson, Lumpkin, and other counties. This company was one of the original cavalry companies.
- D Company (Dougherty Hussars) was formed in Dougherty County, Georgia. This company was one of the original cavalry companies.
- E Company (Roswell Troopers) was formed in Cobb County, Georgia.
- F Company (Grubb's Hussars) was formed in Burke County, Georgia.
- G Company (Fulton Dragoons, B Company) was formed in Morgan County, Georgia.
- H Company (Georgia Troopers, B Company) was formed in Clarke County, Georgia.
- I Company (Richmond Hussars, B Company) was formed in Richmond County, Georgia.
- K Company (Richmond Dragoons) was formed in Richmond County, Georgia. This company was transferred to Phillips' Legion (Georgia), Cavalry by Special Orders #161, Adjutant and Inspector's General's Office (July 11, 1864).
- L Company was formed in DeKalb County, Georgia.

=== Battles ===
The cavalry component fought in the following battles:

- Yorktown Siege (April 1862)
- Seven Days Battles (June 25, 1862 – July 1, 1862)
- Battle of Harrison's Landing, Virginia (August 2 – 8, 1862)
- Battle of Middletown, Maryland (September 13, 1862)
- South Mountain, Maryland (September 14, 1862)
- Sharpsburg (September 17, 1862)
- Battle of Barbee's Crossroads, Virginia (November 5, 1862)
- Battle of Dumfries, Virginia (December 12, 1862)
- Battle of Fredericksburg (December 13, 1862)
- Battle of Occoquan, Virginia (December 19, 1862)
- Battle of Dumfries and Battle of Fairfax Station, Virginia (December 27, 1862 – December 29, 1862)
- Battle of Brandy Station (June 9, 1863)
- Battle of Upperville(June 21, 1863)
- Battle of Hanover (June 30, 1863)
- Battle of Gettysburg (July 1 – 3, 1863)
- Battle of Hunterstown (July 2, 1863)
- Second Battle of Brandy Station (August 1, 1863)
- Bristoe Campaign (October 1863)
- Mine Run Campaign (November &ndash December, 1863)
- Battle of the Wilderness (May 5 – 6, 1864)
- Battle of Spotsylvania Court House (May 7 – 21, 1864)
- Battle of North Anna (May 23 – 26, 1864)
- Battle of Trevilian Station (also called Trevilians). (June 11 – 12, 1864)
- Siege of Petersburg (June 1, 1864 – April 1, 1865)
- Battle of Cold Harbor, Virginia (June 1 – 3, 1864)
- Battle of Williamsburg Road, Virginia (October 27, 1864)
- Carolinas campaign (February 2 – April 30, 1865)
- Battle of Bentonville (March 19 – 21, 1865)

== Troup Artillery ==
The artillery battery was known as the Troup Artillery (named for former governor George M. Troup). It was from Athens, Georgia. It was commanded by Captain Henry Hull Carlton after the Legion was reorganized, the Troup Artillery was assigned to the Artillery Battalion of Longstreet's Corps. The Troup Artillery disbanded April 9, 1865.

=== Battles ===
The battles it took part in were:

- Yorktown Siege (April 1862)
- Battle at Lee's Mills, Virginia (April 16, 1862)
- Seven Days Battles, Virginia (June 25 – July 1, 1862)
- Battle of Malvern Hill (July 1, 1862)
- Battle of South Mountain (September 14, 1862)
- Battle of Antietam (September 17, 1862)
- Battle of Fredericksburg (December 13, 1862)
- Battle of Chancellorsville (May 1 – 4 1863)
- Battle of Gettysburg (July 1 – 3, 1863)
- Antietam Creek, Maryland (July 10, 1863)
- Battle of the Wilderness (May 5 – 6, 1864)
- Battle of Spotsylvania Court House May 8 – 21, 1864)
- Battle of North Anna (May 23 – 26 ,1864)
- Siege of Petersburg (June 1, 1864 – April 1, 1865)
- Battle of Cold Harbor (June 1 – 3, 1864)
- Battle of Appomattox Court House (April 9, 1865)

== Famous members ==
- A famous fictional member of Cobb's Legion was Ashley Wilkes, of Gone with the Wind, who was supposedly captured during the Battle of Spotsylvania Court House in 1864.
- Future Atlanta Chamber of Commerce President Benjamin Crane served in the legion.
- Future Mayor of Atlanta Luther Glenn served in the legion.
- Atlanta businessman, publisher, and Atlanta City Council member Zachariah A. Rice served as Major of B Company (Fulton Dragoons) in the cavalry battalion of the legion.

== See also ==
- List of American Civil War legions
- List of Civil War regiments from Georgia

== Literature ==
- Dooley, Vincent Joseph and Samuel Norman Thomas Jr., eds. The Legion's Fighting Bulldog: The Civil War correspondence of William Gaston Delony, Lieutenant Colonel of Cobb's Georgia Legion Cavalry, and Rosa Delony, 1853-1863. Mercer University Press.
- Turner, Nat S. 2002. A Southern Soldier's Letters Home: The Civil War Letters of Samuel Burney, Cobb's Georgia Legion, Army of Northern Virginia. Macon GA: Mercer University Press.
