= Lucy Beall Candler Owens Heinz Leide =

American heiress (1883–1962)

Lucy Beall Candler Leide
- Lucy Candler in 1900
- Born: Lucy Beall Candler; April 14, 1883; Atlanta, Georgia
- Died: September 3, 1962 (aged 79); Atlantic Ocean; RMS Caronia (1947)
- Education: Agnes Scott College
- Spouses: William Davies Owens Sr. (m. 1903; died 1914) Henry Heinz (m. 1920; died 1943) Enrico Leide (m. 1945)
- Children: Elizabeth Candler Owens Vann (1904–1934); William Davies Owens Jr. (1911-1993); Henry Charles Heinz Jr. (1918–1998)
- Parent(s): Asa Griggs Candler; Lucy Elizabeth Howard

Lucy Beall Candler Owens Heinz Leide (April 11, 1883 – September 3, 1962) was an American heiress. She was the only daughter of Asa Griggs Candler, the co-founder of The Coca-Cola Company.

== Biography ==
=== Early life ===
She was born on April 11, 1883, in Atlanta, Georgia. Growing up, she learned to play the piano. She lived with her parents at Callan Castle at 61 Elizabeth Street in the Atlanta, Georgia, neighborhood Inman Park. She attended school at West End Institute. She played the organ for Inman Park Methodist Church. She attended Agnes Scott College in neighboring Decatur, Georgia.

=== Marriages ===
On June 11, 1903, she married her first husband, William Davies Owens. He became an assistant cashier (a manager) at Central Bank and Trust in Atlanta, the bank that Asa Candler started in 1905. At first, they lived together in her parents’ home. In 1910 they moved to a newly built home in nearby Druid Hills which became known as The Goose. It was located at what is now 1449 South Ponce de Leon Avenue. In 1968, the home became the Mother Goose day care center and, later, classroom space for The Paideia School until it burned down in 2009. William Owens died of influenza and a heart attack in the house in 1914. Lucy suffered from a serious bout of typhoid fever.

Around 1920, she married Henry Heinz, a banker and president of Kiwanis International. Heinz was shot by a burglar at their home, Rainbow Terrace, in 1943. A black railroad worker confessed to the crime, but rumours persisted that a relative murdered Heinz.

Around 1945, she married Enrico Leide, a concert cellist and orchestra conductor who conducted the first Atlanta Symphony Orchestra from 1920 to 1930. He was the brother of the violinist and composer Manoah Leide-Tedesco.

=== Death ===
She died on September 3, 1962, aboard the RMS Caronia while on a cruise of the Mediterranean Sea.
