= Lullwater House =

Coordinates: 33.8007°N 84.3157°W

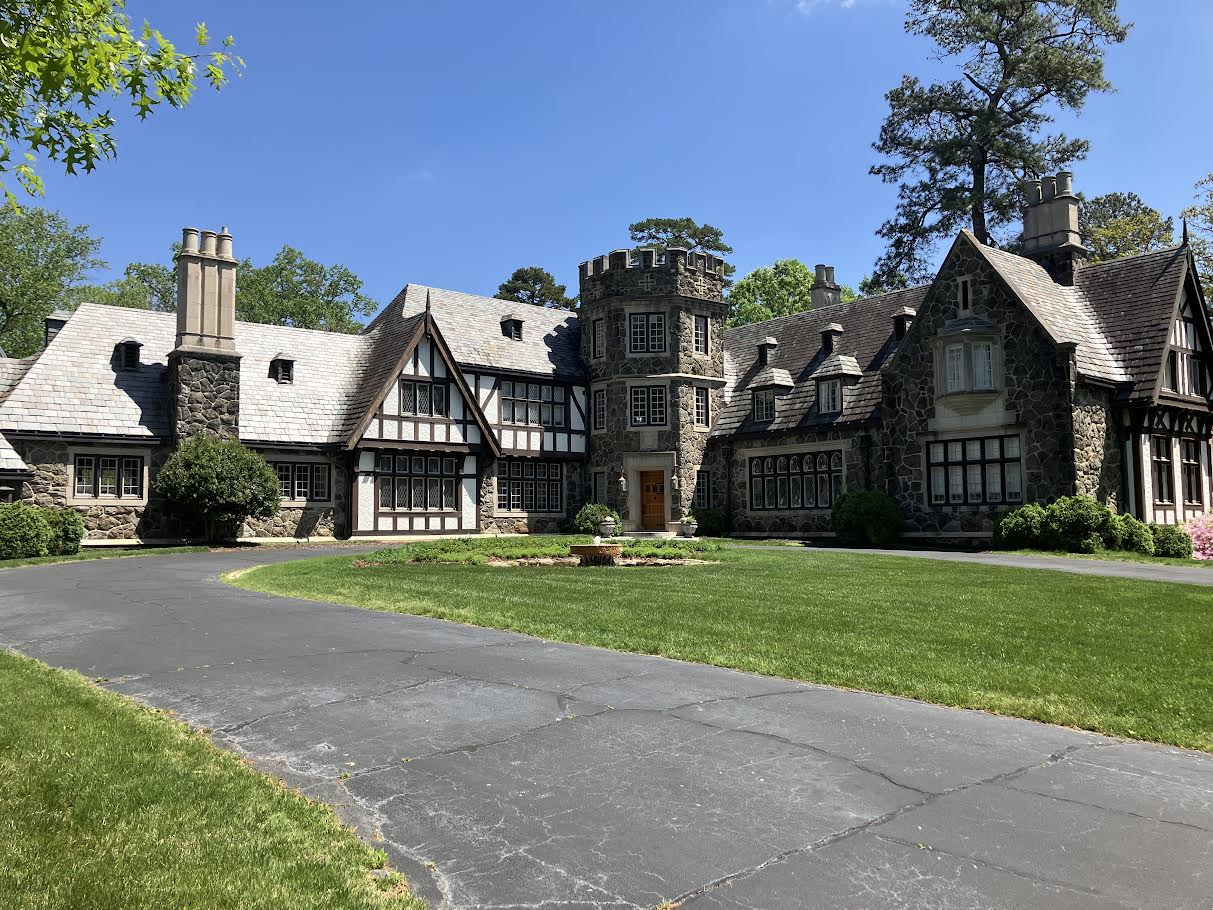
- Lullwater House from front (April 2025)
- Interactive map of Lullwater House
- Location: Emory University near Atlanta, Georgia

History
- Built: 1926

Site notes
- Architect: Ivey and Crook
- Architectural style: Tudor-Gothic revival
- Owner: Walter T. Candler (1926–1958); Emory University (1958–present)

Lullwater House is the president's mansion at Emory University near Atlanta, Georgia, overlooking Candler Lake. It was built in 1926 as the residence of Walter T. Candler, son of Coca-Cola founder Asa Griggs Candler. The mansion is in the form of an L, in Tudor-Gothic revival style. The architects were Ivey and Crook.

== History ==
During the early 1920s, Walter T. Candler, acquired a large tract of land near Emory University, comprising nearly 200 acres between Clifton Road and Clairmont Road, in Atlanta's Druid Hills neighborhood. The property, located near the northeastern boundary of the campus, was primarily wooded and used for pasture at the time.

Candler commissioned the Atlanta architectural firm Ivey and Crook to build the house. Construction of the building began in 1925 and was completed in 1926. Architect Lewis E. Crook designed the house, while his business partner, Ernest D. Ivey, oversaw its construction in the style of a 16th-century English country estate. The 7,500-square-foot Tudor-style mansion was built for about $200,000 with much of its granite quarried on the 185-acre estate, which included a racetrack. Candler named the estate Lullwater Farms, using the property for horse racing and cattle grazing.

In 1958, Candler sold the house and surrounding property to Emory University, where he had graduated in 1907. The house was first used for offices before being designated as the residence of Emory University's presidents in 1963. Sanford Atwood became the first president of Emory to take up residence in the mansion adjoining the campus. Since then, Emory presidents have continued to live there when they hold that position.

Lullwater House made a cameo appearance in the 1989 Academy Award-winning film Driving Miss Daisy.

The estate should not be confused with Lullwater Estate, originally called Rainbow Terrace, the mansion built for Lucy Candler Heinz, Walter T. Candler and Asa G. Candler, Jr.'s sister.

== Past residents ==
- Walter T. Candler
- Sanford S. Atwood
- James T. Laney
- William M. "Bill" Chace
