= Samuel Candler Dobbs =

American businessman (1868–1950)

- Born: November 8, 1868; Georgia, United States
- Died: October 31, 1950; United States
- Occupations: Business executive, philanthropist
- Employer: The Coca-Cola Company
- Organizations: Associated Advertising Clubs of America, Better Business Bureau
- Known for: President and chairman of The Coca-Cola Company; early advocate of advertising ethics
- Notable work: $1 million gift to Emory University; Dobbs Building at Reinhardt University
- Title: President (1919–1920), Chairman (1919–1922)
- Relatives: Asa Griggs Candler (uncle)

Samuel Candler Dobbs (November 8, 1868 – October 31, 1950) was president (1919–1920) and chairman of The Coca-Cola Company, from 1919 to 1922.

== Early life and education ==
Dobbs was born on November 8, 1868, in Carroll County, Georgia. He was the son of Harris Henry Dobbs, and nephew of Asa Griggs Candler, founder of The Coca-Cola Company.

== Career ==
Dobbs began his career as an Atlanta-based Coca-Cola salesman, during which he persuaded Joe Biedenharn of the Biedenharn Candy Company to set up a Coca-Cola dispenser in this store and order the beverage on a regular basis, thereby fueling sales and recognition of the Coca-Cola name. Dobbs later became the company's sales manager and president.

In 1909, Dobbs became president of the Associated Advertising Clubs of America, now the American Advertising Federation (AAF), and began to make speeches on the subject.

Dobbs played a pivotal role in the establishment of the Better Business Bureau in 1912.

== Philanthropy and legacy ==
In January 1939, Dobbs made a $1,000,000 unrestricted gift to the Emory University. Several endowed chairs are named after him. Additionally, Dobbs was a member and president of the Board of Trustees at Reinhardt University, donating thousands of dollars, most notably to build an academic building in 1926, which is named in his honor.
