= Oskar Fried =

German conductor and composer (1871–1941)

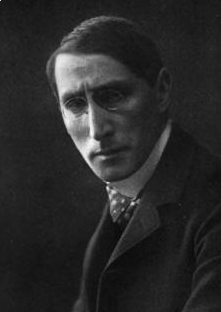
Fried in 1906

Oskar Fried (1 August 1871 – 5 July 1941) was a German conductor and composer. He was known as a great admirer of Gustav Mahler, whose works he performed many times throughout his life. Fried was also the first conductor to record a Mahler symphony. He held the distinction of being the first foreign conductor to perform in Russia after the Bolshevik Revolution (1922). He eventually left his homeland in 1933 to work in the Soviet Union after the political rise of Adolf Hitler's Nazi Party, and became a Soviet citizen in 1940.

In 1899, Fried married the amateur poet Augusta (Gusti) Rathgeber (1872–1926) and had two daughters with her, Monika and Emerentia (dates are unknown). From 1892, Gusti Rathgeber had been married to German poet Otto Julius Bierbaum but left him when she and Fried met, and fell in love with each other.

== Biography ==
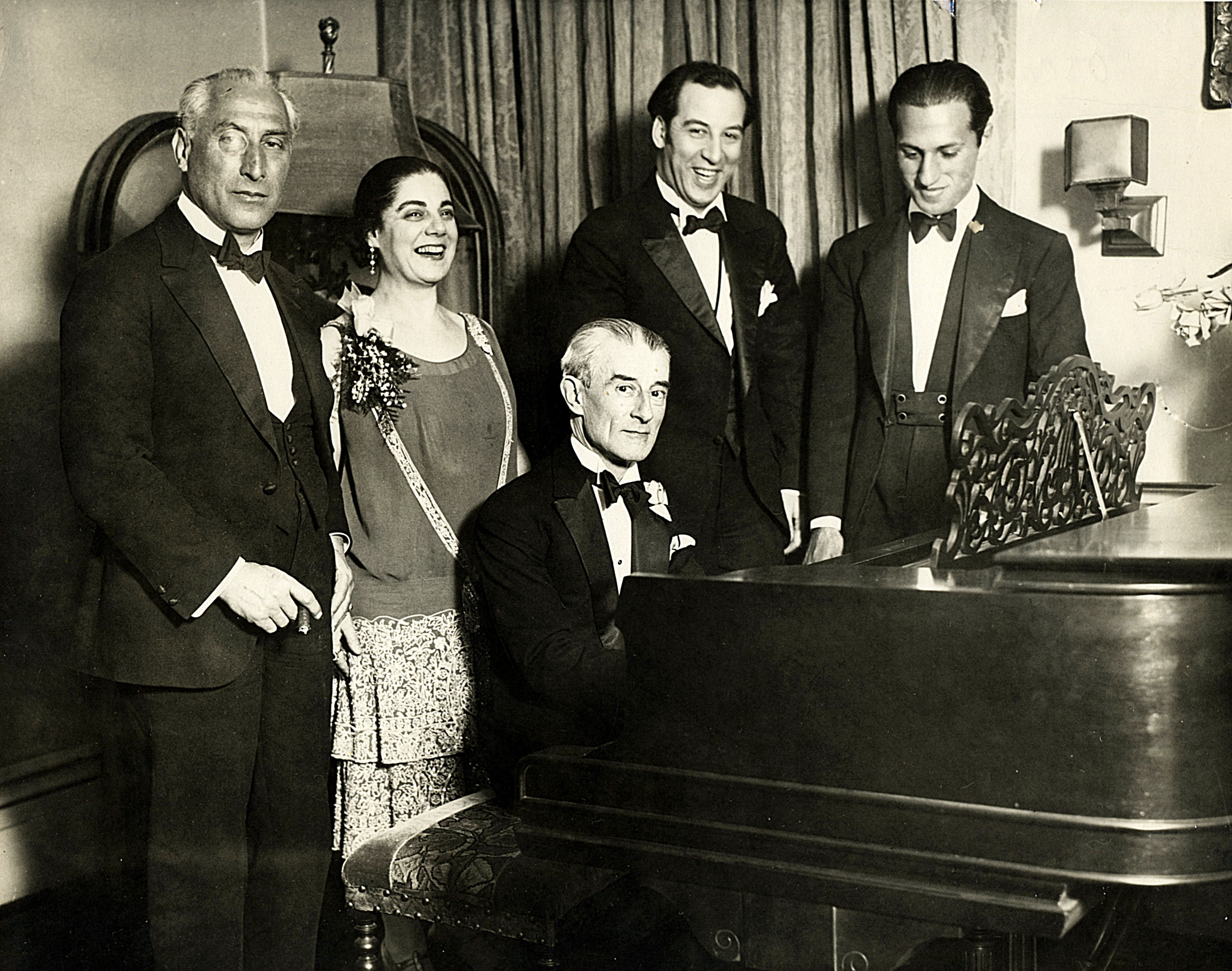
Birthday party honoring Maurice Ravel in New York City, March 8, 1928. From left: Oskar Fried, Éva Gauthier, Ravel at piano; Manoah Leide-Tedesco; and George Gershwin.

Born in Berlin, the son of a Jewish shopkeeper, he worked as a clown, a stable boy and a dog trainer before studying composition with Iwan Knorr (1891–92, Hoch'sche Conservatory) and Engelbert Humperdinck (as private student) in Frankfurt. He later moved to Düsseldorf to study painting and art history. After a spell in Paris, he returned to Berlin in 1898 to study counterpoint with Xaver Scharwenka.

The performance in Berlin, and later in Vienna, of his composition Das trunkene Lied ("The Drunken Song") for chorus and orchestra brought Fried his first public successes and led to his appointment in 1904 as the conductor of a Berlin choral society.

Fried first met Gustav Mahler in Vienna in 1905. The meeting resulted in the second complete performance of Mahler's "Resurrection" Symphony in Berlin on 8 November 1905, in the presence of the composer (Otto Klemperer led the offstage band during this performance). On 10 November 1906 he introduced Russia to Mahler's music when he performed the same work in St Petersburg. From 1907 to 1910, he directed the famous choral society, Sternscher Gesangverein in Berlin. On 4 February 1913 Fried conducted the German premiere with the Berlin Philharmonic of Mahler's Ninth Symphony, the second performance of the work. Between 24 September and 18 October 1920 he gave the first (almost complete) Mahler cycle in Vienna, conducting all the symphonies (except the 8th which he apparently never performed), incl. Das Lied von der Erde, Kindertotenlieder, Lieder eines fahrenden Gesellen, and some Wunderhorn songs. The same year, on 7 December, he returned to Vienna, and conducted Mahler's Das klagende Lied.

In 1922, he went to the USSR as the first foreign conductor invited to perform after the Russian Revolution, and was greeted by Lenin on the station platform.

Following a matinee concert on 23 October 1921 (in the Scala Palace in Berlin) Fried made the first recording (acoustic) of any Mahler symphony, the Second, with the Berlin Staatskapelle, and Emmi Leisner and Gertrud Bindernagel as soloists, cf. announcement in the Berliner Tageblatt, 23 Oct. 1921. (After this concert Fried only again conducted another Mahler symphony in Berlin, on 25 October 1925, the Fourth). However, probably for financial reasons (inflation), the recording of the Second was only released four years later, in early April 1925 (cf. advertisement in the Berliner Tageblatt, 5 April 1925, p. 30). The performance has later been praised as "remarkably successful" and a "highly adventurous undertaking for an acoustic recording" which required "careful planning and experimentation". That same year, he also made the first recording of any complete Bruckner symphony: his Seventh and the first recording of Richard Strauss's Alpine Symphony.

In November 1927, at the invitation of the BBC programme planner and his own former student Edward Clark, he made his British conducting debut, in a program of Delius, Weber, Brahms and Liszt in London.

Driven from Germany by the anti-Semitism of the Nazi regime in 1933, he emigrated to the Georgian city of Tbilisi in the Soviet Union. He conducted the Tbilisi opera and later the Moscow Radio Symphony Orchestra, eventually becoming a Soviet citizen. He died in Moscow in 1941.

== Compositions by Oskar Fried ==
The list of Fried’s compositions comprises the following published scores.

- 3 Lieder, op. 1 for voice and piano (B. Firnberg, Frankfurt)
- Adagio and Scherzo, op. 2 for wind instruments, 2 horns and kettle-drum (Breitkopf & Härtel)
- 4 Lieder, op. 3 for voice and piano (A. Dencke, Berlin)
- 3 Lieder, op. 4 for voice and piano (A. Dencke, Berlin)
- Drei Lieder, op. 5 for voice and piano (Bote & Bock, Berlin 1901)
- [7] Leichte vierhändige Klavierstücke, op. 6 for piano four hands (Bote & Bock, Berlin 1901)
- Sieben Lieder, op. 7 for voice and piano (J. Hainauer, Breslau 1903)
- 3 two-part songs in canon form op. 8 (J. Hainauer, Breslau)
- Verklärte Nacht (Rich. Dehmel), op. 9 for mezzo-soprano, tenor and orchestra (Breitkopf & Härtel)
- Präludium und Doppelfuge, op. 10 for string orchestra (J. Hainauer, Breslau)
- Das trunk’ne Lied (Fr. Nietzsche), op. 11 for soprano, contralto and bass, mix. choir and orchestra (J. Hainauer, Breslau 1904)
- Drei Lieder, op. 12 for four-part female chorus (piano ad. lib.) (J. Hainauer, Breslau 1903)
- Drei Lieder zu alten Wolksweisen, op. 13 for voice and piano (J. Hainauer, Breslau 1904)
- Lied der Mädchen, op. 14 for four-part women’s chorus and violin solo (harp ad. lib.] (J. Hainauer, Breslau 1904)
- Erntelied (Rich. Dehmel), op. 15 for male chorus and orchestra (J. Hainauer, Breslau)

=== Works without opus numbers and unpublished ===
- Four orchestral songs (performed 1912).
- Die Auswanderer (Emil Verhaeren/Stefan Zweig), melodrama for voice and orchestra (performed 1913).

== Bibliography ==
- Peter Cahn: Das Hoch'sche Konservatorium in Frankfurt am Main (1878-1978), Frankfurt am Main: Kramer, 1979.
- de la Grange, Henry-Louis (1999). Gustav Mahler Volume 3. Vienna: Triumph and Disillusion (1904-1907). Oxford: Oxford University Press. ISBN 0-19-315160-X.
- David Ewen, Encyclopedia of Concert Music. New York; Hill and Wang, 1959.
- Alexander Gurdon: Von Mahler bis Moskau. Der Dirigent und Komponist Oskar Fried. Münster 2023.
