= Enrico Leide =

- Born: May 24, 1887; Italy
- Died: July 18, 1970 (aged 83) Fulton County, Georgia
- Genres: Classical
- Occupations: Musician, conductor
- Instrument: Cello
Enrico Leide
- Spouse: Lucy Beall Candler Owens Heinz (m. 1945-62, her death)
- Relatives: Manoah Leide-Tedesco (brother)

Enrico Leide (May 24, 1887 – July 18, 1970) was a concert cellist and orchestra conductor, conducting the first Atlanta Symphony Orchestra from 1920 to 1930. He was also music director of the palatial Paramount Theater in Atlanta upon its opening in 1920. He was the brother of violinist and composer Manoah Leide-Tedesco. He was the third husband of Lucy Beall Candler Owens Heinz Leide (1883-1962), daughter of Coca-Cola founder Asa Griggs Candler.
