= Éva Gauthier =

Canadian-American mezzo-soprano and voice teacher (1885–1958)

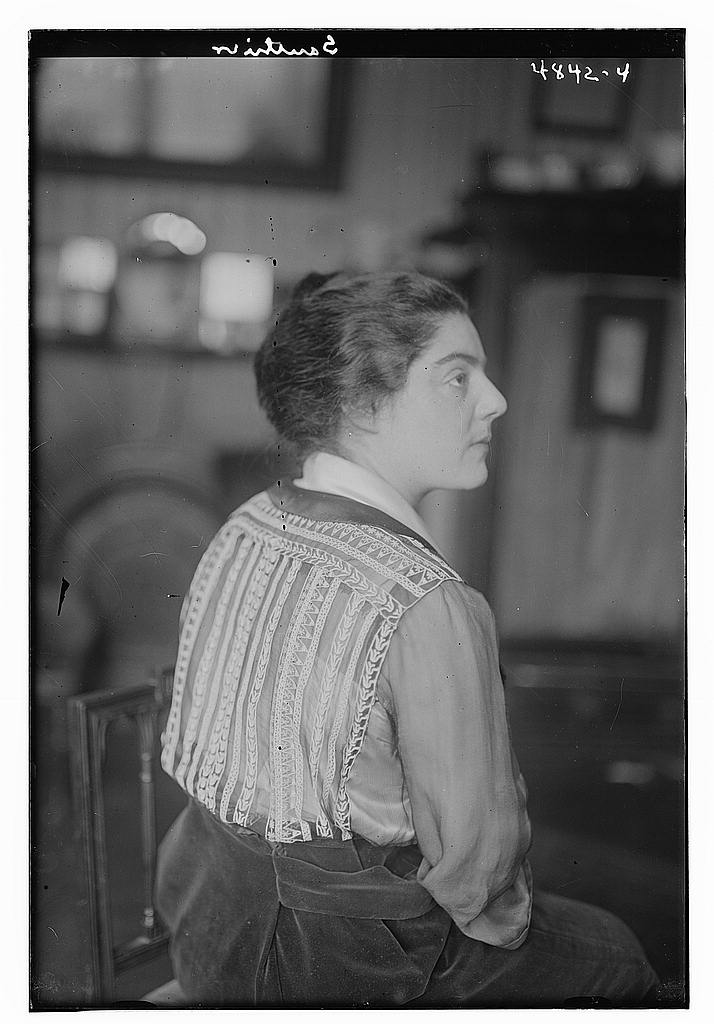
- Gauthier in 1919
- Born: September 20, 1885; Ottawa, Ontario, Canada
- Died: December 1958 (aged 73) (exact date of death unclear); New York City, U.S.
- Occupation: Voice teacher
- Known for: mezzo-soprano, voice teacher

Ida Joséphine Phoebe Éva Gauthier (September 20, 1885 – December 20 or 26, 1958) was a Canadian-American mezzo-soprano and voice teacher. She performed and popularized songs by contemporary composers throughout her career and sang in the American premieres of several works by Erik Satie, Maurice Ravel and Igor Stravinsky, including the title role in the latter's Perséphone.

With Sir Wilfrid Laurier and Zoé, Lady Laurier, and Lord Strathcona, as her patrons, Eva Gauthier initially trained and performed in Europe. She then travelled to Java and for four years immersed herself in its native music, which she introduced to North American audiences on her return. She retired from performing in 1937, and opened a voice studio in New York, where she became a founding member of the American Guild of Musical Artists and served on its board of governors. Gauthier was praised for the many qualities her singing brought to music. The citation from the Campion Society of San Francisco, which she received in 1949, said: "...her rare open-mindedness and unorthodox enthusiasm having been initially responsible for the recognition of many vital and important modern composers".

== Singing career ==
Born in Ottawa, Ontario, Gauthier received musical lessons as a child in harmony, voice, and piano. She made her professional debut singing at Ottawa's Notre Dame Basilica for Queen Victoria's funeral mass in 1901. The custom of the time dictated that North American musicians travel to Europe for training if they desired a reputable professional career, and in July 1902, at the age of seventeen, Gauthier set out for Europe, financed by her aunt and uncle, Zoé, Lady Laurier, and Sir Wilfrid Laurier.

=== Training in Europe ===
Gauthier travelled to France, where she received private voice lessons from Auguste-Jean Dubulle of the Paris Conservatory. Nodules on her vocal cords were problematic, but they were removed surgically. She later began training under Jacques Bouhy, whom she would later credit for her vocal technique.

In 1906, Gauthier was retained by fellow Canadian singer Emma Albani to accompany her on a tour of England and her Canadian farewell tour. Albani provided a degree of mentorship to Gauthier during the 30-week tour of Canada.

Lord Strathcona awarded Gauthier a scholarship in 1906 that allowed her to return to Europe and continue her vocal studies. She returned there and continued both to study and give performances. Her first operatic performance came in 1909 in Pavia, Italy, as Micaëla in Bizet's Carmen. She landed a second operatic role as Mallika in Delibes' Lakmé, which was being performed by the London Covent Garden opera company. The opera opened in June 1910. Supposedly, Luisa Tetrazzini, the prima donna soprano of the company, feared that Gauthier's voice would outshine her own, and demanded that Gauthier be removed from the opera. The company's director acquiesced to Tetrazzini's demands, informing Gauthier on opening night that she would not be performing. Rather than give in to artistic blackmail, Gauthier quit opera entirely.

=== Move to Java ===
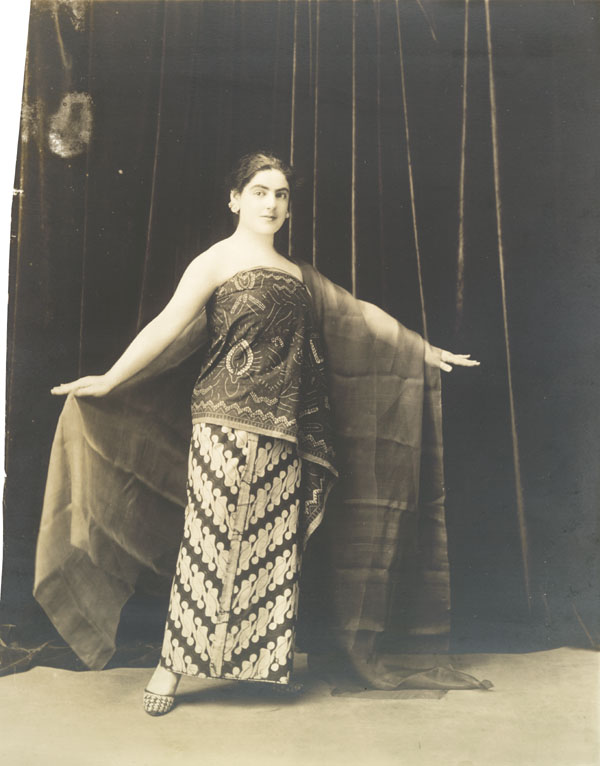
Gauthier in Javanese costume

Disappointed by her blocked entry into the operatic scene, Gauthier departed Europe and travelled to Java. There, she met a Dutch importer and plantation manager named Frans Knoote. Gauthier and Knoote married on May 22, 1911 (divorced 1918). Gauthier studied the music of Java, and began to include this in her repertoire. Her accompanying pianist was Paul Seelig, who had previously been the conductor for the Kraton of Surakarta, which afforded Gauthier a number of opportunities.

On permission of the Javanese court, she studied the gamelan, probably being the first western woman with a classical music education to be afforded this opportunity. While living in Java, Gauthier travelled extensively, giving performances in China, Japan, Singapore, Malaya, Australia, and New Zealand. She remained in Java for four years, but with the outbreak of World War I she decided to travel back to North America, arriving in New York City in the fall of 1914.

=== Return to North America ===
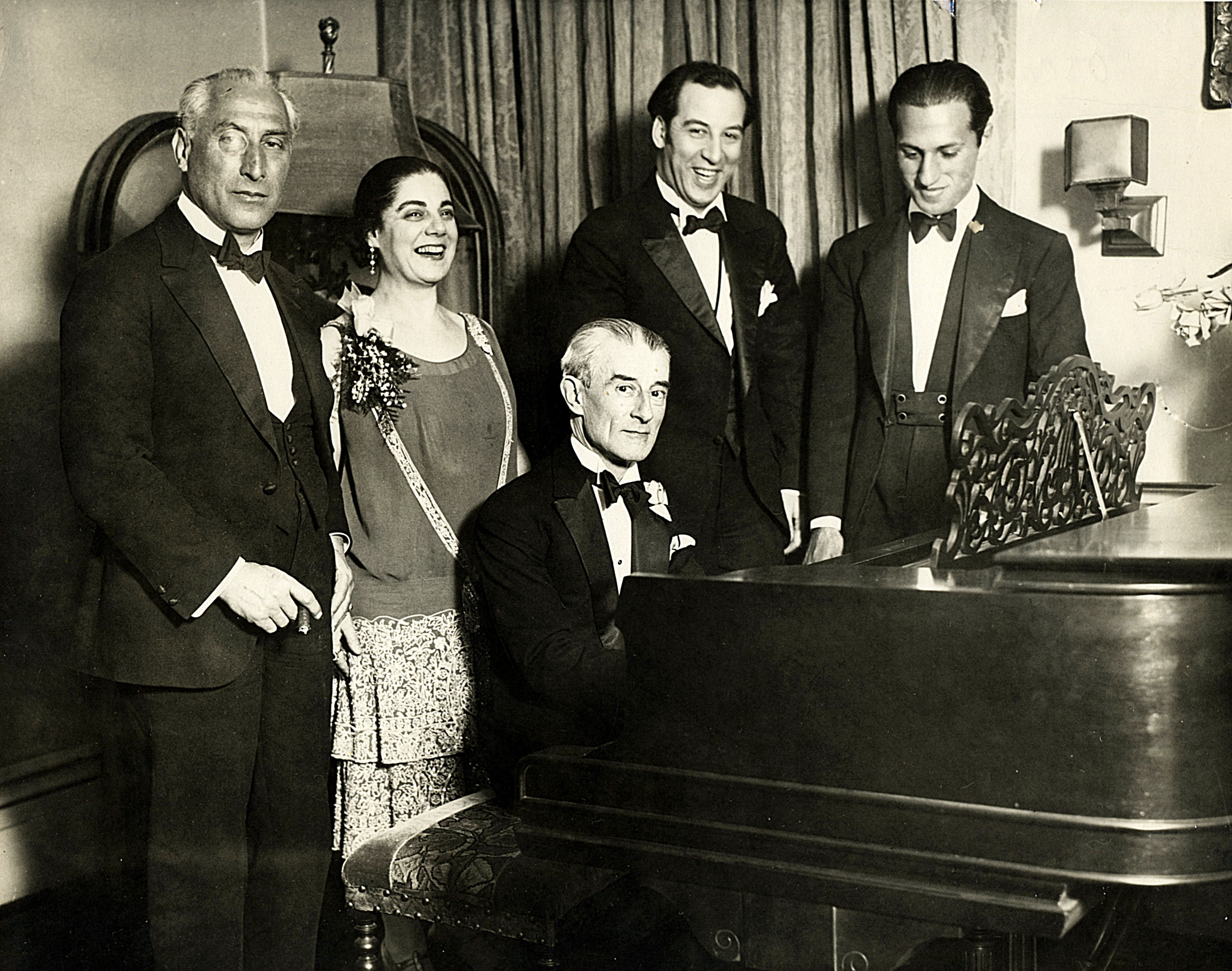
Birthday party honoring Maurice Ravel in New York City, March 8, 1928. From left: Oscar Fried, Gauthier, Ravel at piano; Manoah Leide-Tedesco; and George Gershwin

Arriving in New York, Gauthier struggled to find a niche in an already crowded music scene. She put on a performance in vaudeville entitled Songmotion, which combined Javan music with dancers. New York was already home to many North American and European musical performers, so Gauthier focused on her Javan musical repertoire, which she combined with knowledge and skill in modernist western singing. Gauthier began giving annual recitals at Aeolian Hall, and in November 1917 her performance there caught the eye of many leading composers. She developed her own reputation quickly, known as a "...sensitive purveyor of interesting, untried songs". She gave renditions of three songs by Maurice Ravel. Her performance then also included American premieres of Stravinsky's Three Japanese Lyrics and Griffes' Five Poems of Ancient China and Japan. The performance was a great success, and she began to receive invitations to perform premieres of songs by contemporary composers. Stravinsky arranged to have Gauthier to premiere all of his vocal pieces.

Gauthier travelled to Paris in 1920 at the behest of the Music League of America. Sent there to arrange a tour of North America by Ravel, she struck up a friendship and professional correspondence not only with him, but also with Erik Satie and Les Six. This led to more music being sent to her by various composers that she would premiere in concert. She accepted and premiered almost all works sent to her, the only exception being a refusal to perform Pierrot lunaire by Arnold Schoenberg. Through this, Gauthier performed large amounts of contemporary French music across the United States. She also included American music in all of her concerts. Gauthier toured America frequently and returned to Europe in 1922, and again in 1923. She began to explore jazz music in concert as well, earning her negative reviews by many musical critics.

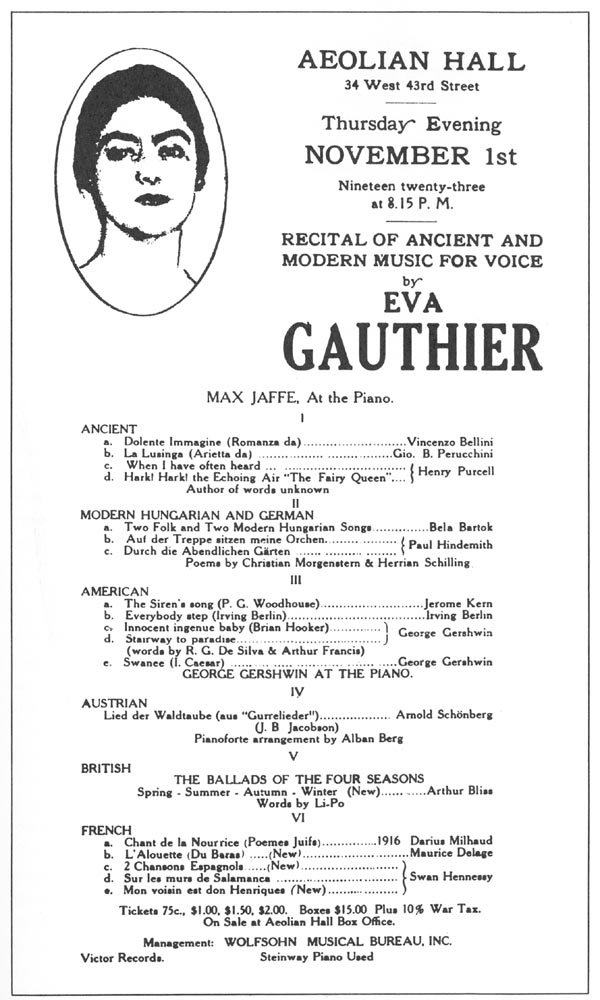
Playbill from "Recital of Ancient and Modern Music for Voice", Aeolian Hall, 1923

Her 1923 annual performance at Aeolian Hall entitled "Recital of Ancient and Modern Music for Voice" became a historic occasion when she presented the works of George Gershwin, the first time his works were performed by a classical singer in concert. The first half of the programme presented works considered serious music at the time. She performed both classical works by Vincenzo Bellini and Henry Purcell, mixing them with modernist and neoclassical works by Béla Bartók, Paul Hindemith, Arnold Schoenberg, Arthur Bliss, Darius Milhaud, Maurice Delage, and Swan Hennessy. The second half of her performance would upset the musical establishment, however. She opened with "Alexander's Ragtime Band" by Irving Berlin, then performed works by Jerome Kern and Walter Donaldson, and finally finished with three works by George Gershwin: "I'll Build a Stairway to Paradise", "Innocent Ingénue Baby", and "Swanee". Gershwin played the piano for these pieces. Important figures in the audience included Ernestine Schumann-Heink, Virgil Thomson, and Paul Whiteman. Although some musical critics panned her decision to include Jazz music, the performance was overall a huge success, and provoked serious discussion among conservative audiences whether jazz music could be considered serious art.

Gauthier continued to present music that was thought poorly of by conservative audiences. On some occasions, such as her performances of Gershwin in New York in 1923 and 1925, as well as in London in 1925, this was quite successful. A critic in Vienna welcomed her musical selection as a reprieve from the usual fare of classical performances – Schubert, Brahms, Wolf, Richard Strauss – while praising her skill with more classical choices. Other performances suffered – she was booed while performing works by Heitor Villa-Lobos at the Festival of the International Society for Contemporary Music in Venice. She became a celebrity, and continued giving performances across the United States, Europe, and her native Canada. On the sixtieth anniversary of Canadian Confederation in 1927, she gave a performance in Ottawa which was the first transcontinental radio broadcast in Canada. Although she toured Canada from time to time, and attended performances of Canadian music in New York, she held a negative opinion of Canada's treatment of native musicians, saying "Canadians ... would rather listen to foreigners than their own people."

=== Retirement from the stage ===
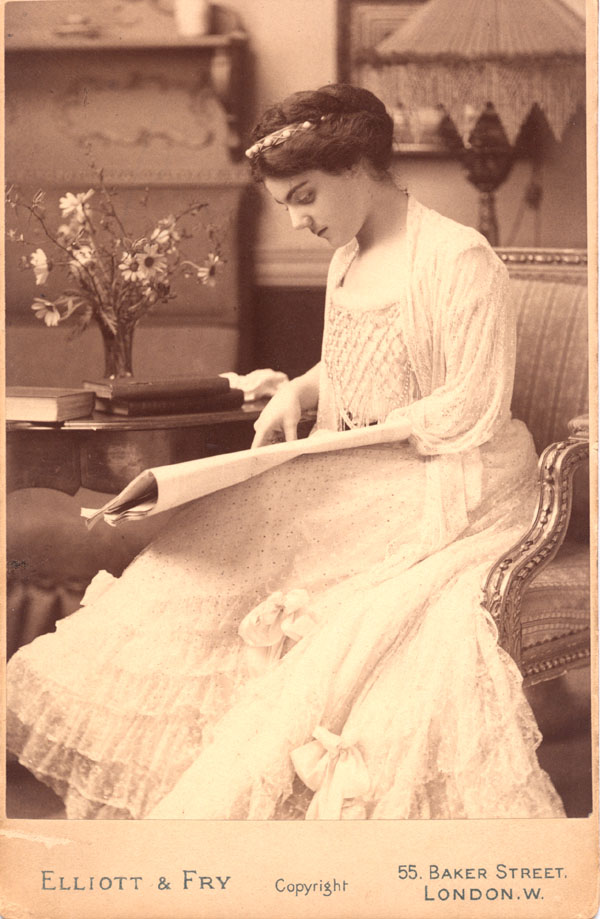
Gauthier, 1905

Illness forced Gauthier to halt giving performances in the late 1920s, but she would return to the stage in 1931, giving a concert in Havana, Cuba. As time passed she began to engage more and more in teaching, and less and less in stage performing. Her income from teaching was substantially better than from touring. She retired from performing entirely in 1937, and opened a music studio in New York. There she became a founding member of the American Guild of Musical Artists, serving on its board of governors. She died in late December 1958, in New York City.

== Views of critics and audiences ==
Gauthier was a controversial musician in her time. Her choice of music for performance was often condemned, and often praised. The appropriateness of jazz music for a classically trained singer, combined with the performances taking place in concert halls lead some critics to cheer her for promoting otherwise overlooked music, and others to condemn her for taking lowbrow music into a highbrow venue.

A May 1, 1917, review by The New York Times praised her natural talent, with some reservations about the unpolished quality of her voice. Her ability to capture the spirit of the pieces was also praised: "...her singing of songs by Frenchmen of today and the day before yesterday gave pleasure because of her understanding of them and the appropriate expression which she found for them."

A November 12, 1923, Time review of her performance of historic Italian songs, as well as modern English, French, Austrian, German and American numbers focused on her choice to include selections of contemporary jazz music. The critic remarked "Her voice was much too good for jazz."

Her performance in Fargo in 1923 resulted in a headline in the Fargo Forum the next day that was headed "Eva Gauthier's Program Sets Whole Town Buzzing: Many People Are of Two Minds Regarding Jazz Numbers – Some Reluctantly Admit That They Like Them – Others Keep Silent or Condemn Them".
