= Manoah Leide-Tedesco =

American classical composer

- Born: Tranquillo Manoah Leide-Tedesco; August 19, 1894; Senigaglia, Italy
- Died: January 29, 1982 (aged 87)
- Relatives: Enrico Leide (brother)

Tranquillo Manoah Leide-Tedesco (August 19, 1894 – January 29, 1982) was an Italian-American composer, conductor and violinist.

== Biography ==
Tranquillo Manoah Leide-Tedesco was born in Senigallia, Italy, but grew up in Naples. His father, Lazzaro Leide-Tedesco, originally from Reggio Emilia, became rabbi of the Jewish community of Greater Naples (1904–1941) and the chief rabbi of Naples. Manoah Leide-Tedesco grew up in an artistic family of composers, singers and musicians. His brother, Enrico Leide (1887–1970) was a concert cellist and orchestra conductor, conducting the first Atlanta Symphony Orchestra from 1920 to 1930.

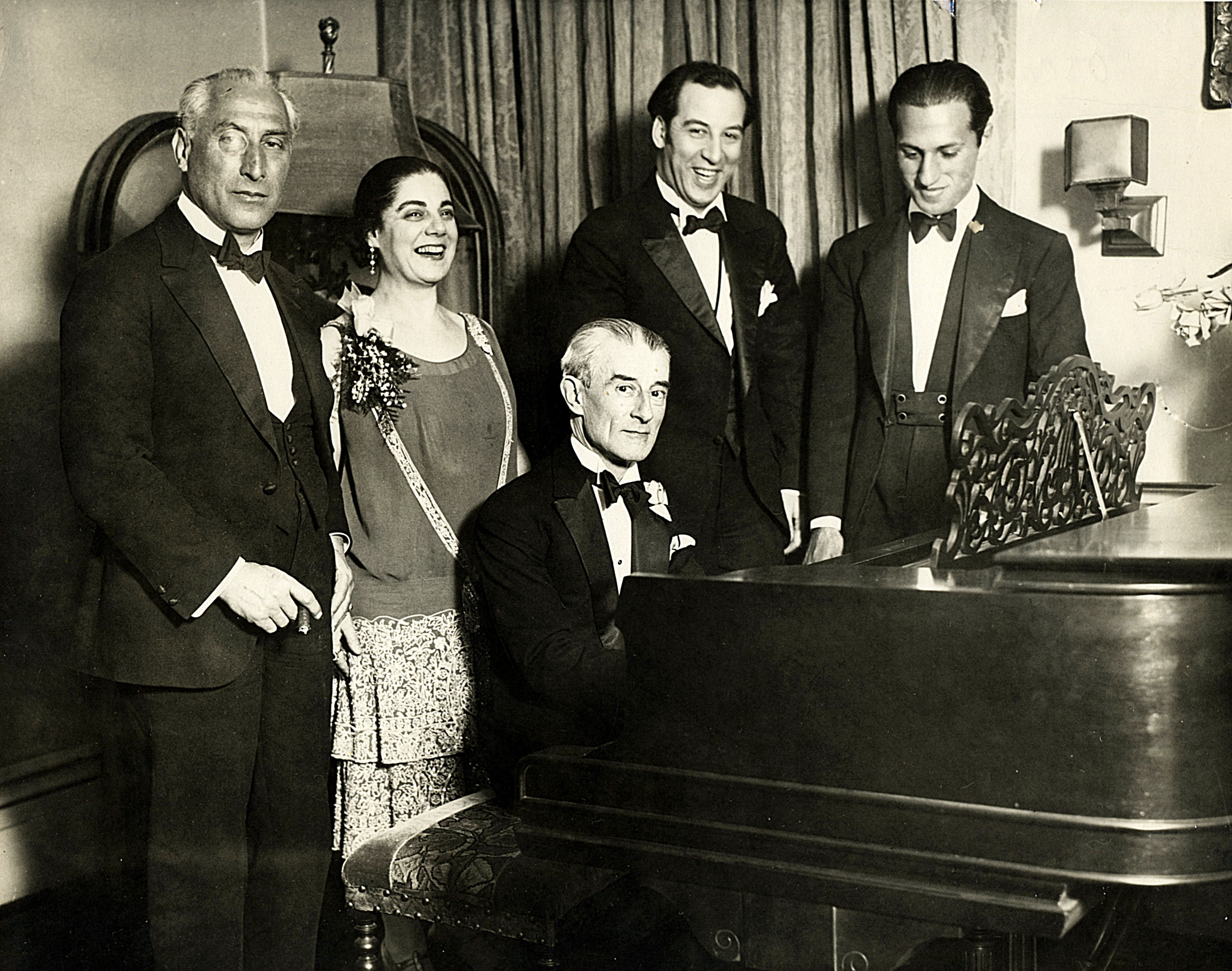
Birthday party honoring Maurice Ravel, New York City, March 8, 1928. From left: Oscar Fried, Eva Gauthier, Ravel at the piano; Manoah Leide-Tedesco, and George Gershwin.

Educated at the University of Naples, Leide-Tedesco did his post graduate studies in Czechoslovakia (1925–1931), receiving his Doctorate in Philology and Sociology. He attended the Prague Conservatory where he continued his musical studies under Ildebrando Pizzetti, Josef Suk and Karel Jirák.

From 1922 through 1935, Leide-Tedesco conducted many of the leading symphony orchestras of Central Europe including the Philharmonics of Prague, Vienna and Pressburg. During this time he was entrusted with some of the first performances of the works of Maurice Ravel (L'enfant et les sortilèges and Alborada del Gracioso), Manuel de Falla (El sombrero de tres picos, El amor brujo), Richard Strauss (Parergon zur Symphonia Domestica), Alessandro Longo (Studi sinfonici per "La matrona d'Efeso"), Schoenberg (Pierrot Lunaire), Stravinsky (Histoire du Soldat) and Ildebrando Pizzetti.

Leide-Tedesco conducted the New Chamber Symphony of New York City from 1932-1935. The first performances of his own compositions were broadcast during this time over the NBC chain from Rockefeller Center. He conducted orchestras for: NBC, CBS, Chicago Symphony, Baltimore Symphony, Orquesta Sinfonica (Mexico City), Czech Philharmonic, BBC, RAI, Westdeutscher Rundfunk, Grant Park Music Festival.

Leide-Tedesco first visited the United States in 1912 and became a U. S. citizen in 1932. Between 1935 and 1945, he served with the United States Government where he was Chairman of Cultural Programs for the Office of Education. He also held positions with the United States Department of State and the Institute of International Understanding. He lectured widely in the United States and Latin America and campaigned for fairer immigration laws and better integration of new immigrants.

Throughout his life, Leide-Tedesco traveled the world collecting books, paintings, music and friends. Personal friends who corresponded frequently, and visited with him and his wife, Regina, in the artist community of Colorado Springs (1955-1981), included painters Emmanuel Glicenstein Romano, Alois Lecoque, and Paschal Quackenbush; musicians and composers Ernst Toch, Mario Castelnuovo-Tedesco (no relation), Rafael Kubelík, Karel Jirák, and operatic singer Rosa Raisa; as well as his good friend Albert B. Sabin, developer of the oral polio vaccine.

== Compositions ==
In 1952 Rafael Kubelik conducted the first Chicago Symphony Orchestra performance of Leide-Tedesco's For Harvest Time, Prelude of Dances.

Other works by Leide-Tedesco include:

Op. 1 — Trio for Strings

Op. 2 — Cycle of Songs for Soprano

Op. 3 — Serenade for baritone and viola for the play La cena delle beffe

Op. 4 — Romance for Violin and Piano

Op. 5 — Concerto for Violin and Orchestra (unfinished)

Op. 6 — Chansonette Française for Orchestra

Op. 7-8 — Two Compositions for Violin and Orchestra

Op. 9-10 — Two Violin Solo from Scarlatti

Op. 11-14 — Wood Wind Quintets (two books)

Op. 15 — "Asturias" for Symphony Orchestra

Op. 16 — Preludes for Pianoforte (3)

Op. 17 — Prelude No. XXIV

Op. 18 — Fugue No. VIII

Op. 19 — Prelude of Dances for Symphony Orchestra

Op. 20 — Exotic Melodies from South America

Op. 21 — Sonata for Violin and Pianoforte

Op. 22 — Sonata di Siciliano per Pianoforte

Op. 23 — Quartetto ad Archi

Op. 24 — Concerto a Quattro con Fagotto

Op. 25 — Hommage à Mahler - Violin and Orchestra

Op. 26 — Sonata for Oboe and Pianoforte (World premiere April 18, 1961 at the Teatro La Fenice (Sale Apollinee) as part of the Venice Biennale International Festival of Contemporary music)

Op. 27 — Symphony on Greek Tragedy

== Sources ==
- Cassidy, Claudia (December 10, 1952). "Poulenc's Concerto and Leide-Tedesco Dances New in Orchestra Hall". Chicago Daily Tribune, p. B8
- Milwaukee Journal (May 6, 1945). "Leide-Tedesco is Speaker at Closing Event". p. 4, Section VII
- No, Kum-Sok and Osterholm, J. Roger (1996). A MIG-15 to Freedom: Memoir of the Wartime North Korean Defector. McFarland. ISBN 0-7864-0210-5
- Pittsburgh Press (August 7, 1927). "Leide-Tedesco Home from European Trip".
- Stuckenschmidt, H. H. (1968). Maurice Ravel, Variations on His Life and Work (Translated from German by Samuel R. Rosenbaum). Philadelphia: Chilton
