= Benjamin Crane =

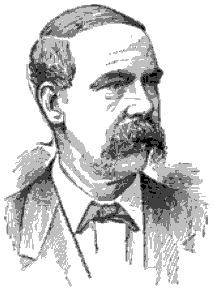
- Born: Benjamin Elliott Crane; December 19, 1835; Athens, Georgia
- Died: January 15, 1885 (aged 49); Atlanta, Georgia
- Education: University of Georgia
- Occupation: Businessman
- Spouse: Sarah Clayton (m. 1867)

Benjamin Elliott Crane (December 19, 1835 – January 15, 1885) was a businessman in post-bellum Atlanta, Georgia, United States.

== Biography ==
Benjamin Crane was born in Athens, Georgia to Ross Crane and Martha White Elliott. He graduated from the University of Georgia in 1854 and studied civil engineering in Troy, New York.

He served in Cobb's Legion during the American Civil War, becoming a brigade quartermaster with the rank of major in 1863. He moved to Atlanta in 1865 when the city was still in ashes.

He married Sarah Clayton, a daughter of William Wirt Clayton and Corline Semmes on February 21, 1867. In business he was a natural leader and he was instrumental in the growth of the Atlanta Chamber of Commerce to an institution of great usefulness.

He was a member of the Georgia's constitutional convention of 1877, and was a member of the state's capitol commission.

Benjamin Crane died in Atlanta on January 15, 1885. At the time of his death, he was still president of the Chamber of Commerce, as well as a member of the city's board of police commissioners.
