= Callan Castle (Atlanta) =

Mansion in Georgia, US

Coordinates: 33.75830°N 84.35605°W

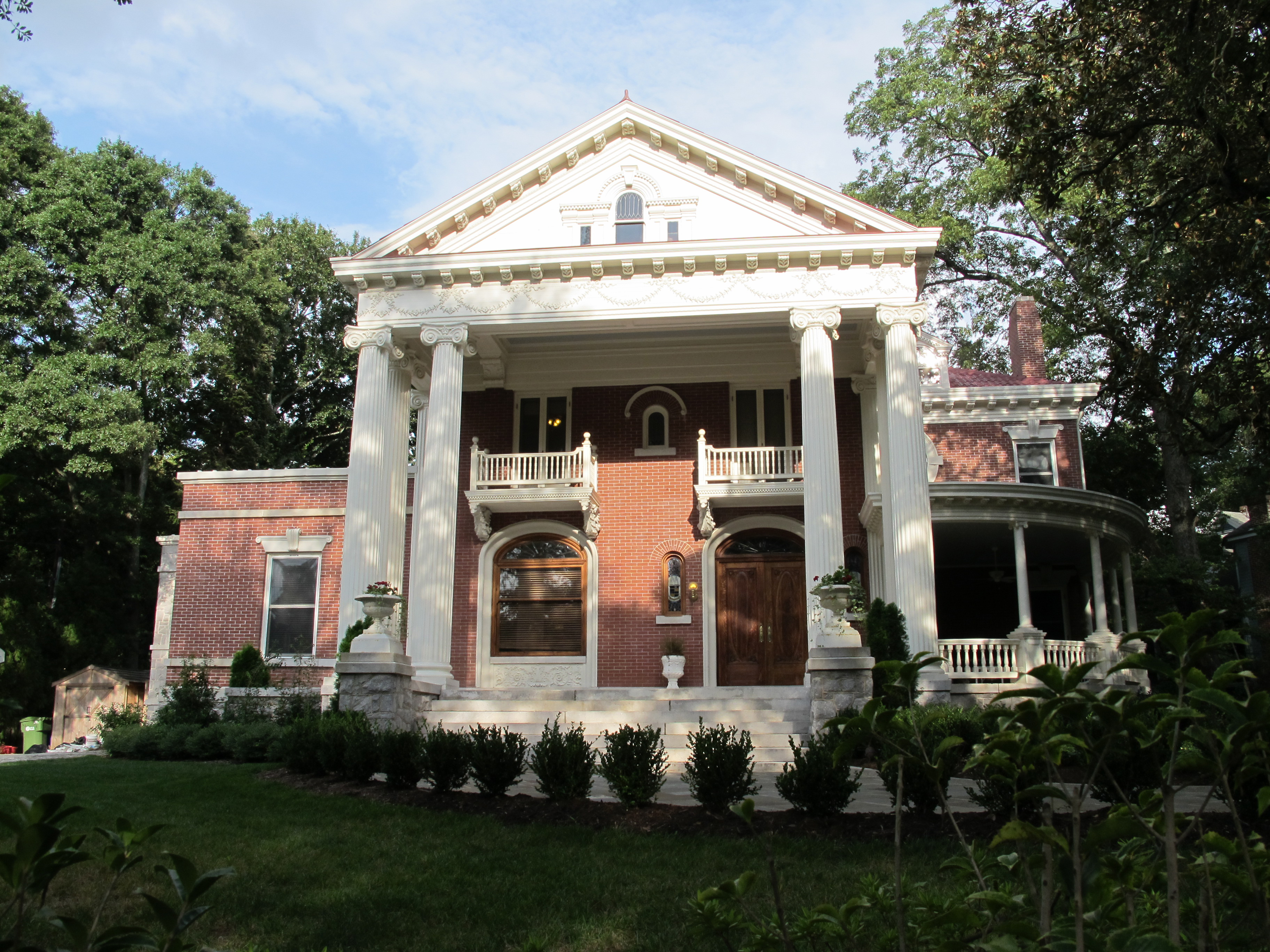
Callan Castle in Inman Park

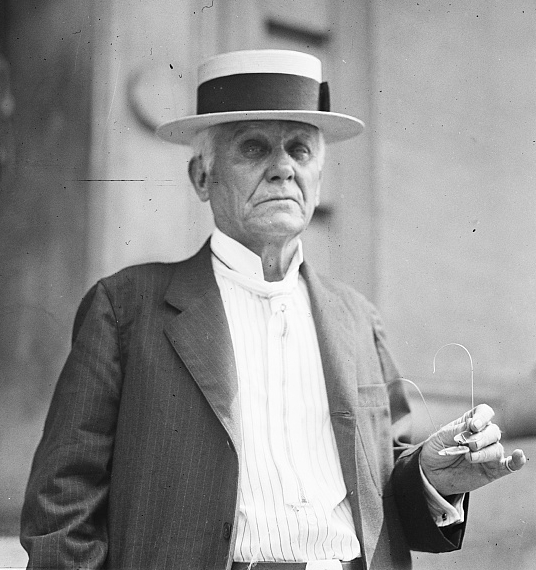
Asa Griggs Candler

Callan Castle at 145 (old numbering system: 61) Elizabeth Street NE (corner of Euclid St.) in the Inman Park neighborhood of Atlanta, was originally the mansion of Asa Griggs Candler, the business tycoon who made his fortune selling Coca-Cola. It was built in 1902-1903 by George Murphy in Beaux-Arts style; the land and building cost almost $13,000. The name alludes to the family's ancestral home in Ireland (as does Callanwolde, the mansion of Candler's eldest son)

In 1916 Candler moved to his new mansion at 1500 Ponce de Leon Avenue in the Druid Hills neighborhood of Atlanta, which is currently a Melkite Catholic church.

Callan Castle was restored in 2011. The home has a 2023 estimated market value of $3.0 million and has been listed for movie set rentals starting at $250,000 per month.

== Architecture ==
The home is about 5,622 square feet (522.3 m^{2}) large, one of the largest homes in Inman Park. It has a two-story pedimented portico, alluding to Greek Revival mansions, but according to the AIA Guide to the Architecture of Atlanta, "the rambling mass of the building, the asymmetrical position the entrance doorway, and the mixture of materials are definitely Victorian in character. The delicate decor of garlands on the entablature and the Palladian motif above it are characteristic of the Colonial Revival style."
