= Charles Howard Candler Sr. =

American businessman (1878–1957)

- Born: December 2, 1878; Atlanta, Georgia, U.S.
- Died: October 1, 1957 (aged 78)
- Education: Georgia Military Institute; Oxford College of Emory University; Emory University School of Medicine; Bellevue Hospital Medical College
- Occupations: Businessman; author
- Spouse: Flora Glenn Candler
- Children: 1
- Parent(s): Asa Griggs Candler; Lucy Elizabeth Howard

Charles Howard Candler Sr. (December 2, 1878 – October 1, 1957) was an American businessman and author. He was one of the few people that his father, Asa Candler, first trusted with the secret formula used to make Coca-Cola, which then included coca leaves.

== Biography ==
Candler was born in Atlanta, Georgia, the first born of Asa and Lucy Elizabeth Candler (née Howard). He was given the middle name Howard to honor his maternal grandfather, merchant George C. Howard.

As a youngster, he attended the Georgia Military Institute and then the Emory College at Oxford. Candler studied two years of medicine at the Emory School of Medicine and was a student at Bellevue Hospital Medical College for another year before deciding to join his father at Coca-Cola.

According to Emory College's list of famous alumni, Candler graduated in 1898.

During 1900, Charles Howard Candler visited Canada and learned that Coca-Cola was already being sold in the cities he toured, Vancouver and Victoria. He was in Canada to study the possibility of shipping the soda to that country.

During 1916, Candler succeeded Asa Candler as president of the Coca-Cola Company. He left the post soon after but returned four years later, running the company from 1920 to 1923, when the company was under the ownership of Ernest Woodruff, who had bought it from the Candler family.

Candler, along with Robert W. Woodruff (Ernest's son), remains one of only two people to have been president of Coca-Cola twice.

== Personal life ==
Candler married Flora Glenn Candler, who was a prominent patron of the arts. Together with her brother, Thomas K. Glenn, they gave the funds to build Glenn Memorial Methodist Church on the Emory University campus. Candler's gifts to Emory, totaling around $13 million, included a new administration building and half-interest in Asa G. Candler Inc. Following his death, an endowment was established in his memory to create the Charles Howard Candler Professorships.

== Home ==
Candler's mansion, located at the Druid Hill section of Atlanta, is currently the Callanwolde Fine Arts Center and hosts community arts classes as well as various social events every year.

== Professorship ==
Candler served Emory University as chair of its board of trustees for 28 years, succeeding his father in 1929 and serving until his death in 1957. His widow endowed the Charles Howard Candler professorships for faculty members who have distinguished themselves through outstanding teaching and internationally recognized scholarship.

== Writings ==
Candler was the writer of a biographical book on his father, titled "Asa Griggs Candler", which was first published in 1950 and then republished, in 1997, as "Asa Griggs Candler: Founder of Coca-Cola" by his son, Charles Howard Candler Jr, who is now a prominent professor and writer who has written three books himself.
