= Callanwolde Fine Arts Center =

Historic house in Georgia, United States

- Callanwolde
- U.S. National Register of Historic Places
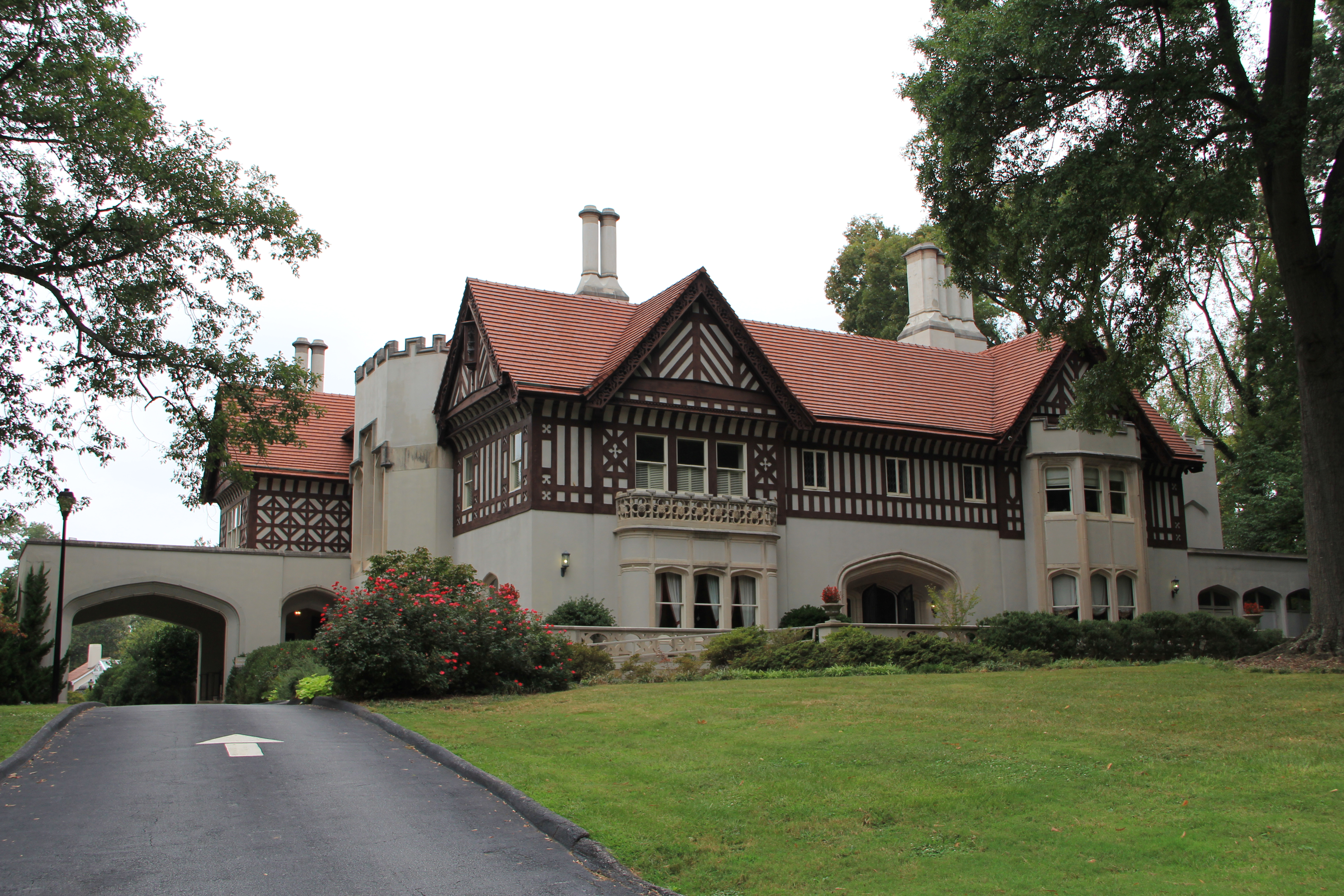

- Location within Atlanta Location within Georgia Location within the United States
- Location: 980 Briarcliff Rd., NE, Atlanta, Georgia
- Area: 11.9 acres (4.8 ha)
- Built: 1917; 109 years ago
- Architect: Henry Hornbostel
- Architectural style: Late Gothic Revival
- NRHP reference No.: 73002137
- Added to NRHP: April 23, 1973

Callanwolde Fine Arts Center is a 501(c)(3) non-profit community arts center that offers classes and workshops for all ages in visual, literary and performing arts. Special performances, gallery exhibits, outreach programs and fundraising galas are presented throughout the year. Callanwolde is also involved in community outreach, specializing in senior wellness, special needs, veterans, and low income families.

The mansion known as "Callanwolde" was built by Charles Howard Candler, president of the Coca-Cola Company (1916, 1920–1923), chairman of the board of trustees of Emory University (for nearly 30 years), and eldest son of Asa Griggs Candler, founder of the Coca-Cola Company.

Callanwolde is a Gothic-Tudor style mansion situated on a landscaped 12.5-acre estate. It is listed on the National Register of Historic Places.

== Support ==
Support is provided to Callanwolde Fine Arts Center through a grant appropriated by the DeKalb County Board of Commissioners, in part by DeKalb County Parks, Recreation & Cultural Affairs, and in part by the Georgia Council for the Arts through appropriations of the Georgia General Assembly. Georgia Council for the Arts is a Partner Agency of the National Endowment for the Arts.

== The Candler family ==
Callanwolde was the home of the family of Charles Howard Candler, known as Howard (1878–1957), from 1920 until 1959.

Howard Candler was the oldest son of Asa Griggs Candler (1851-1929), the Atlanta pharmacist who, in 1891, purchased the rights to the formula for Coca-Cola, which had been developed by another Atlanta pharmacist, John S. Pemberton, in 1886 as a tonic for most common ailments.

Howard Candler attended public elementary schools in Atlanta and received a Bachelor of Arts degree from Emory College (a Methodist Episcopal institution that was at that time located in Oxford, Georgia). While in Oxford in 1895, he received a keg of Coca-Cola syrup from his father that he shared with his classmates — the first Coca-Cola ever seen there.

After graduating from Emory in 1898, Candler attended Atlanta College of Physicians and Surgeons for two years and the University of Bellvue Hospital Medical College for one year. Much later in life, in 1942, he received the Doctor of Laws degree from Emory University, which was by then located in Atlanta.

In 1903, Candler married Flora Harper Glenn. The couple had three children, Charles Howard Jr. (born 1904), Catherine Harper (Mrs. William Warren) (born 1906), and Mary Louisa (Mrs. Alfred Eldridge) (born 1912).

== The Candlers, Coca-Cola and Emory University ==
Emory University is frequently called "Coca-Cola U" because of the long history of patronage by both the Candler family and the Coca-Cola Company that they founded.

In 1914, the decision was made to move Emory College from Oxford, Georgia. Howard's uncle, Bishop Warren Akin Candler, was president of Emory College and the chairman of the Methodist Episcopal Education Commission. Atlanta's Chamber of Commerce pledged $500,000 if the new Emory University would locate in the city, and in 1915 Asa Griggs Candler donated a $1 million endowment to the institution.

In 1915, Henry Hornbostel was engaged to design the new Emory campus in the Druid Hills neighborhood of Atlanta. The following year, Howard Candler, who had been a vice president of Coca-Cola since 1906, became the company's president, a position he held until his retirement from the company in 1923 (following its acquisition by the Woodruffs). His new position as head of the company meant that Howard Candler would now be the principal benefactor of Emory University. Work on his new home, Callanwolde, was begun the following year near the Emory campus and designed by Hornbostel.

In 1929, Candler became chairman of the board of trustees of Emory University, a position he held until his death in 1957. He continued the family's history of generous financial support of the institution as well. In 1947, he gave the university assets valued in excess of $15 million.

Two years following Candler's death, his widow donated the Callanwolde estate, along with many of the original furnishings, to Emory University. Emory subsequently sold the property to the First Christian Church, which retained ownership until the citizens of DeKalb County rallied to acquire Callanwolde in 1971.

== Candler ancestry and the Callanwolde name ==
Candler family lore holds that William Candler of Newcastle upon Tyne served as an officer in Cromwell's Army during the Irish Rebellion of the mid-17th century. Candler served in Sir Hardress Waller's Regiment, and after the end of the campaign was elevated to the rank of lieutenant colonel for "meritorious conduct in the field" by a grateful Cromwell and Parliament, and granted lands in the Barony of Callan, County Kilkenny. He brought his wife, Anne Villiers, widow of Capt. John Villiers, and family over to Ireland, who made their Irish home at Callan Castle. The name "Callanwolde" is based on this family connection to the Irish town of Callan and the Old English word for "woods" ("wolde").

Recent genealogical research suggests that parts of this legend are, in fact, true, although some details have been lost, changed, and exaggerated over the years.

The estate is located in the Druid Hills neighborhood of Atlanta, which was planned by the firm of Frederick Law Olmsted, designer of Central Park in New York City and the Biltmore Estate in Asheville, North Carolina. Of the estate's original 27 acres, approximately 12 remain intact. The grounds, which consist of sculptured lawns, formal gardens, nature trails, and a rock garden, have been partially restored by the DeKalb County Federation of Garden Clubs and the Callanwolde Foundation, and are maintained by DeKalb County.

Designed by Henry Hornbostel, who also designed Emory University, Callanwolde has an open plan. Most rooms adjoin the great halls located on each floor, and the entire 27,000 square foot mansion is centered on a large, enclosed courtyard. The attention to fine detail is evident in the craftsmanship of the walnut panelling, stained glass, bronze balustrades, artistry of the delicate ceiling and fireplace reliefs, and pierced tracery concealing the Aeolian organ chambers.

Callanwolde remained the Candlers' home for 39 years. In 1959, two years after Mr. Candler's death, and nine years prior to her own death, Mrs. Candler donated the estate (including many of the original furnishings) to Emory University.

The house (minus the furnishings) was later acquired by the First Christian Church, which subsequently sold two parcels of the property totalling approximately four acres on one side and approximately 12 acres on the other. The mansion was temporarily leased to an artist who planned to establish an art gallery there. During this period, the condition of the mansion deteriorated. Considerable damage was done to the organ pipes; careless use of fire resulted in damage to the flooring in one bedroom; and lighting fixtures, door and window latches, and other hardware were stolen. Eventually, the church placed the remaining 12 acres, which included the mansion, the carriage house, a gardener's cottage, two greenhouses, and various out-buildings, up for sale.

To save Callanwolde from possible destruction, a fund-raising drive was led, first by an ad hoc committee of the Druid Hills Civic Association, and later by the Callanwolde Foundation that formed from it. The property was purchased for $360,000 in 1972, with a matching funds grant from the open spaces program of the Federal Housing and Urban Development Department. DeKalb County contributed $40,000, accepted ownership of the property, and agreed to maintain it. Callanwolde was placed on the National Register of Historic Places and the Callanwolde Fine Arts Center was opened under the supervision of the DeKalb County Recreation, Parks, and Cultural Affairs Department. In 1983, however, the non-profit Callanwolde Foundation accepted responsibility for the operation of the Callanwolde Fine Arts Center, although DeKalb County continues to maintain the house and grounds.

== Recent history ==
During the Summer Olympics held in Atlanta in 1996, the house was transformed into "Casa Italia," the official hospitality headquarters of the Italian Olympic Committee. Guests attending lavish parties hosted by the Italian delegation included Prince Albert of Monaco, Luciano Pavarotti, Andrew Young, Alberto Tomba, and a host of famous Italian fashion designers, chefs, Olympic athletes, artists, and entertainers.

Callanwolde has also served as a filming location for several Hollywood films, including Sharkey’s Machine, starring Burt Reynolds, and Bear, a feature film about the life of legendary football coach Bear Bryant. In 2003, Callanwolde served as the backdrop for several scenes used in the feature film Stroke of Genius, the Bobby Jones Story, starring Jim Caviezel.

Support for Callanwolde Fine Arts Center is provided through a grant appropriated by the DeKalb County Board of Commissioners, in part by DeKalb County Parks, Recreation & Cultural Affairs, and in part by the Georgia Council for the Arts through appropriations of the Georgia General Assembly. Georgia Council for the Arts is a Partner Agency of the National Endowment for the Arts.

Callanwolde is also mentioned in Pat Conroy's novel, The Prince of Tides.

== Architectural history ==
The mansion was built between 1917 and 1921, and is considered a severe and modern approach to the late Gothic Revival style of architecture.

The front facade of the two and one-half story building has a medieval half-timbered rhythmical design across the upper stories, crenellated bays, and Tudor arches, as well as strapwork ornament, yet all of these elements of Tudor-Gothic design have been subjected to a simplicity or severity of design that is a uniquely 20th-century approach to the use of these traditional design motifs.

The construction is of poured concrete and steel and a rubble base of tile covered by stucco, and the house is built on a two-foot concrete foundation.

All wooden floors are anchored to timbers laid in concrete over masonry units supported by reinforced concrete beams. This quality of construction explains the fact that no settlement is discernable in the building. Downstairs floors are of walnut with walnut pegs, with the exception of the living room, which has white oak flooring. Upstairs floors are of white oak. The house also features large rafters and panelling of walnut.

The house has a central heating system featuring recessed units behind decorative metal screens. It was originally steam-heated, but was converted from coal to gas heat in the 1930s. A vacuum system was built into the house, but it is no longer operable. There was also a buzzer system with a control panel in the kitchen, but this no longer exists. The pipes of the Aeolian organ are accommodated in the infrastructure of the house in four separate chambers.

== Architect Henry Hornbostel ==
Callanwolde was designed by architect Henry Hornbostel (1867–1961) of Pittsburgh. Born in Brooklyn, New York, he was classically trained at Columbia University in New York City and the Ecole des Beaux Arts in Paris. He began work in Pittsburgh in 1904 after winning the Carnegie Technical Schools Competition for the design of the campus that is now Carnegie Mellon University. He founded the Department of Architecture at Carnegie Tech. In addition to a private practice in Pittsburgh, he taught at Columbia University. He was at various times a partner in the New York firms of Howell, Stokes & Hornbostel; Wood, Palmer & Hornbostel; Palmer & Hornbostel; and Palmer, Hornbostel & Jones. Although the bulk of his practice centered in and around Pittsburgh, Hornbostel executed projects throughout the country, including the campus plans of Carnegie Tech in Pittsburgh, Emory University in Atlanta, and Northwestern University in Evanston, Illinois; several bridges in New York City; and government buildings in Albany, New York and Oakland, California.

One of the many enduring structures Hornbstel designed was the Williamsburg Bridge (1903) in New York City. Connecting Manhattan to Brooklyn, and designed by Hornbostel and Leffert L. Buck, the 1,600-foot bridge took over seven years to complete. When the bridge opened in 1903, it was the first all-steel, large-scale suspension bridge built in the country, and the longest of its kind in the world. It remained the world's longest suspension bridge until the 1920s.

Hornbostel apparently met Howard Candler through a project for the Coca-Cola Company. In 1915, he designed the master plan for Emory University when it was relocated to Atlanta from Oxford, Georgia.

Hornbostel's work, while drawing heavily on historic precedents of Gothic, Tudor, and Renaissance styles, foreshadows the beginnings of a modernist sensibility in its stripped-down use of forms and relative absence of ornamentation. In this, it represents a transitional period between the academic classicism and gothic revival of the 19th century and the modernist movement of the 20th century.

The Henry Hornbostel Collection is housed in the Architecture Archives of Carnegie Mellon University's Libraries.

Drawings, plans and other information about the original design of the Emory University Campus are maintained by the University Library's Special Collections.
