= Karel Boleslav Jirák =

Czech composer and conductor

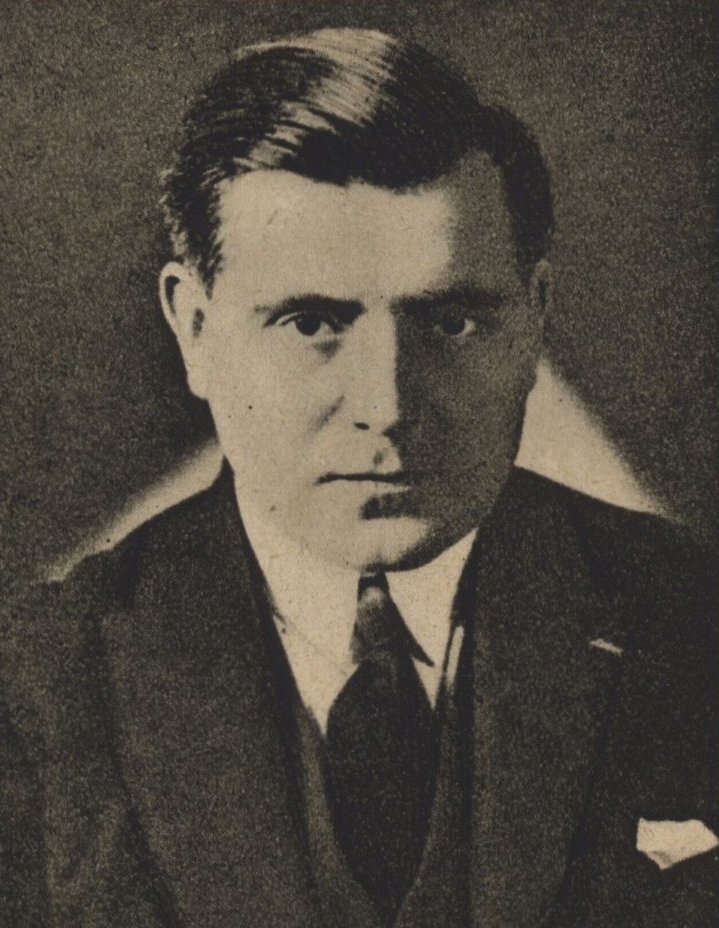
- Jirák in 1929
- Born: Karel Bohuslav Jirák; 28 January 1891; Prague, Bohemia, Austria-Hungary
- Died: 30 January 1972 (aged 81); Chicago, Illinois, U.S.
- Occupations: Composer, conductor
- Known for: Composition, conducting
- Notable work: Apolonius z Tyany (later titled Žena a Bůh), six symphonies, Symphonic Scherzo

Karel Boleslav Jirák (born Karel Bohuslav Jirák; 28 January 1891 – 30 January 1972) was a Czech composer and conductor.

== Life and career ==
Jirák was born Karel Bohuslav Jirák on 28 January 1891 in Prague in Bohemia. He became a pupil of Josef Bohuslav Foerster and Vítězslav Novák at the Charles University and at music academy in Prague. In 1915–1918, he was the Kapellmeister at the Hamburg State Opera and worked from 1918 to 1919 as a conductor at the National Theatre Brno and at a theatre in Ostrava.

From 1920 to 1930, he was a composition teacher at the Prague Conservatory, and principal conductor of the Czechoslovak Radio Orchestra until 1945.

In 1947, he emigrated to the United States, where from 1948 to 1967 a professor at Roosevelt University, Chicago, and, in 1967, a composition teacher at the Conservatory college in Chicago. He remained in this position until 1971. He died in Chicago on 30 January 1972.

Jirák's opera was Apolonius z Tyany (Apollonius of Tyana, 1912–1913), which was initially ignored by Prague's National Theatre and later accepted under the title Žena a Bůh (The Woman and the God, 1936). He wrote six symphonies and several symphonic variations.

In 1952, he wrote a Symphonic Scherzo for volume. He also wrote many suites and overtures, numerous pieces of chamber music, many preludes and a Suite for organ, a Requiem, choruses, and song cycles. He was a popular and renowned musical theorist.
