= Asa Griggs Candler =

American business magnate (1851–1929)

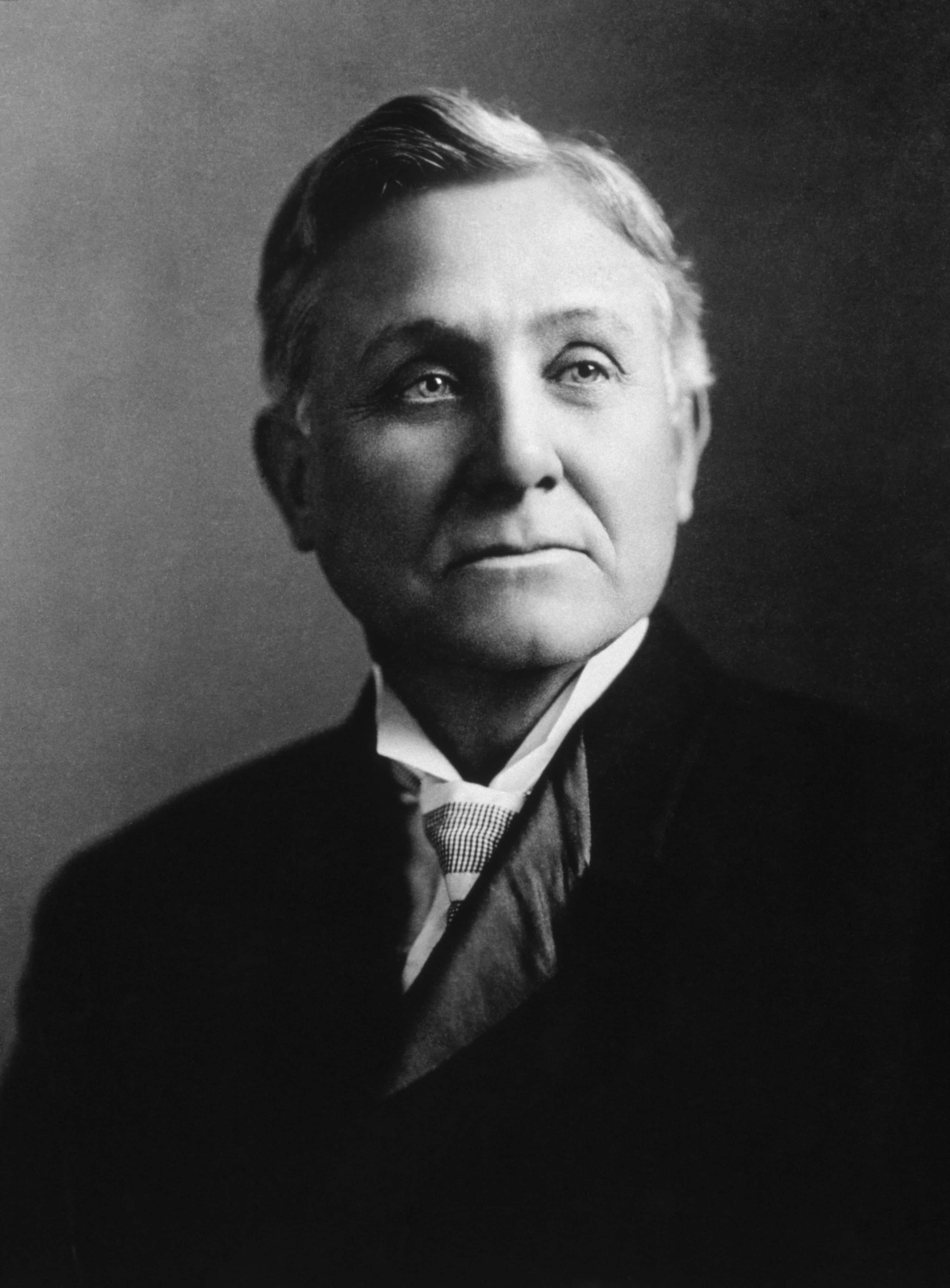

42nd Mayor of Atlanta, Georgia
- In office 1917–1919
- Preceded by: James G. Woodward
- Succeeded by: James Lee Key

Personal details
- Born: Asa Griggs Candler Sr. December 30, 1851 Villa Rica, Georgia, U.S.
- Died: March 12, 1929 (aged 77) Atlanta, Georgia, U.S.
- Resting place: Westview Cemetery
- Spouse: Lucy Elizabeth Howard (m. 1878; died 1919)
- Children: 5, including Asa Jr.
- Occupation: Businessman; philanthropist; politician
- Known for: Founder of the Coca-Cola Company

Asa Griggs Candler Sr. (December 30, 1851 – March 12, 1929) was an American business magnate and politician who in 1888 purchased the Coca-Cola recipe for $2300 (equivalent to $82,417 in 2025) from chemist John Stith Pemberton in Atlanta, Georgia. Candler founded the Coca-Cola Company in 1892 and developed it as a major company.

Prominent among civic leaders of Atlanta, Candler was elected and served as the 41st mayor of the city, from 1916 to 1919. Candler Field, the site of the present-day Hartsfield–Jackson Atlanta International Airport, was named after him, as is Candler Park in Atlanta. As head of Coca-Cola, he built the Candler Building in Atlanta, as well as one in Kansas City (which became known as the Western Auto Building), a Candler Building in New York City, and one in what is now known as the Inner Harbor area of Baltimore, Maryland.

== Family ==
Asa Griggs Candler was born on December 30, 1851, in Villa Rica, Georgia. His parents were Martha and Samuel Charles Candler, a merchant and property owner. His parents raised eleven children, including Asa and his brother Warren Akin Candler. Samuel Charles Candler was a member of the legislature of South Carolina, and fought in the Creek War of 1836.

Candler's children are:

- Asa's oldest son, Charles Howard Candler (1878–1957), was chairman of the board of trustees of Emory University. His family estate was Callanwolde on Briarcliff Road in Druid Hills; it has been adapted for use as a fine arts center.
- The second son, Asa G. Candler Jr. (1880–1953), eccentric, alcoholic, and depressed, became a real-estate developer, opening the Briarcliff Hotel. His Briarcliff mansion and estate—also on Briarcliff Road in Druid Hills—was adapted for use as an alcoholism rehab center, then a psychiatric hospital. It is now owned by Emory University and used as its Briarcliff campus. Asa Jr.'s menagerie of animals enabled a major expansion of Zoo Atlanta in the 1930s. From 1930 to 1952, in front of the scenes or behind them, Asa was responsible for reshaping Westview Cemetery and building its massive Spanish Plateresque abbey.
- Only daughter Lucy (1882–1962) married Henry Heinz, a banker and Kiwanis president. He was shot by a burglar in their mansion, Rainbow Terrace, in 1943. Rumors persisted that a relative murdered him. The widowed Lucy Candler Heinz later married cellist and conductor Enrico Leide. He founded a forerunner of the present Atlanta Symphony Orchestra.
- Third son Walter T. Candler (1885–1967) was a businessman, philanthropist, and horse sportsman. His Lullwater House and estate has been adapted for use as the residence of the Emory University President. Another portion is a park, and other land is the site of a Veterans Administration complex in Druid Hills. Walter T. Candler had 2 sons and 3 daughters.
- Youngest son William Candler (1890–1936), was the local financier of the Atlanta Biltmore Hotel and Biltmore Apartments. He was elected president of the Biltmore Corporation in February 1930, and was manager of the Biltmore Hotel. His mansion, named Rest Haven, is located on Springdale Road in Druid Hills.

== Biography ==
=== Founder of Coca-Cola ===
A druggist in 1888, Asa Griggs Candler met John Stith Pemberton and was intrigued by a sweet, carbonated drink he had developed. Candler bought the Coca-Cola recipe from Pemberton, for an amount rumored to be $2,300. The drink was derived from brewed coca leaves, as well as caffeine, carbonated water, and sugar. In 1892, he founded the Coca-Cola Company. The following year, he trademarked the brand and distributed the first dividends to the company's shareholders.

By 1895, the company was distributing Coca-Cola nationwide in the United States. It first started exporting in 1899, to Cuba. Exports to Europe started two years later. He also developed the famous "$1 contract" where he sold the rights to bottle Coca-Cola in the US for only one dollar. At first, the company advertised Coca-Cola as a drink that relieved mental and physical fatigue, and cured headaches.

In 1903, Candler decided to remove the cocaine component from the coca leaves before mixing them with the drink, and to sell the extracted cocaine to pharmaceutical companies. In 1911, the company reached an annual advertising budget of $1 million. In 1915, the bottling company Root Glass Co. created the iconic Coca-Cola bottle.

In 1916, after Candler was elected mayor of Atlanta, he ended his day-to-day management of the Coca-Cola Company. In 1917, the Coca-Cola company agreed to reduce by 50% the amount of caffeine in the drink. In 1919 Candler gave most of the stock in The Coca-Cola Company to his children. They sold their shares to a consortium of investors led by Ernest Woodruff.

=== Atlanta builder and mayor ===
In 1906 Candler completed what was then Atlanta's tallest building, the Candler Building. It had intricately carved decorations and was 17 stories tall. It still stands at Peachtree and Auburn streets and is listed on the National Register of Historic Places, significant for its architectural detail and role as a company symbol. In 1912 the Candler Building in New York opened.

In 1916, Candler was elected mayor of Atlanta (taking office in 1917). As mayor he balanced the city budget and coordinated rebuilding efforts after the Great Atlanta fire of 1917 destroyed 1,500 homes. He also made large personal loans in order to develop the water and sewage facilities of the city of Atlanta, in order to provide the infrastructure necessary to a modern city.

Candler was also a philanthropist, endowing numerous schools and universities (he gave a total of $7 million to Emory University,) and the Candler Hospital in Savannah, Georgia. Candler had paid to relocate Emory University from Oxford, Georgia, to Atlanta.

=== Death ===
Asa Candler suffered a stroke in 1926 and never recovered. He died on March 12, 1929, at Wesley Memorial Hospital in Atlanta, Georgia. He is buried at Westview Cemetery on the west side of Atlanta.

== Legacy ==
=== Atlanta ===
The Candler Field Museum in Williamson, Georgia, has been established to commemorate the original Candler Field, the first Atlanta airport.

Callan Castle, the Candler home in Inman Park, built from 1902 to 1904, still stands as a private home.

Candler's later mansion, built in 1916 at 1500 Ponce de Leon Avenue, Druid Hills, was later adapted for use as the John Chrysostom Melkite Greek Catholic Church.

In 1922, he donated over 50 acres (200,000 m^{2}) of his Druid Hills holdings to the City of Atlanta for what became Candler Park. That year he also sold the Central Bank and Trust.

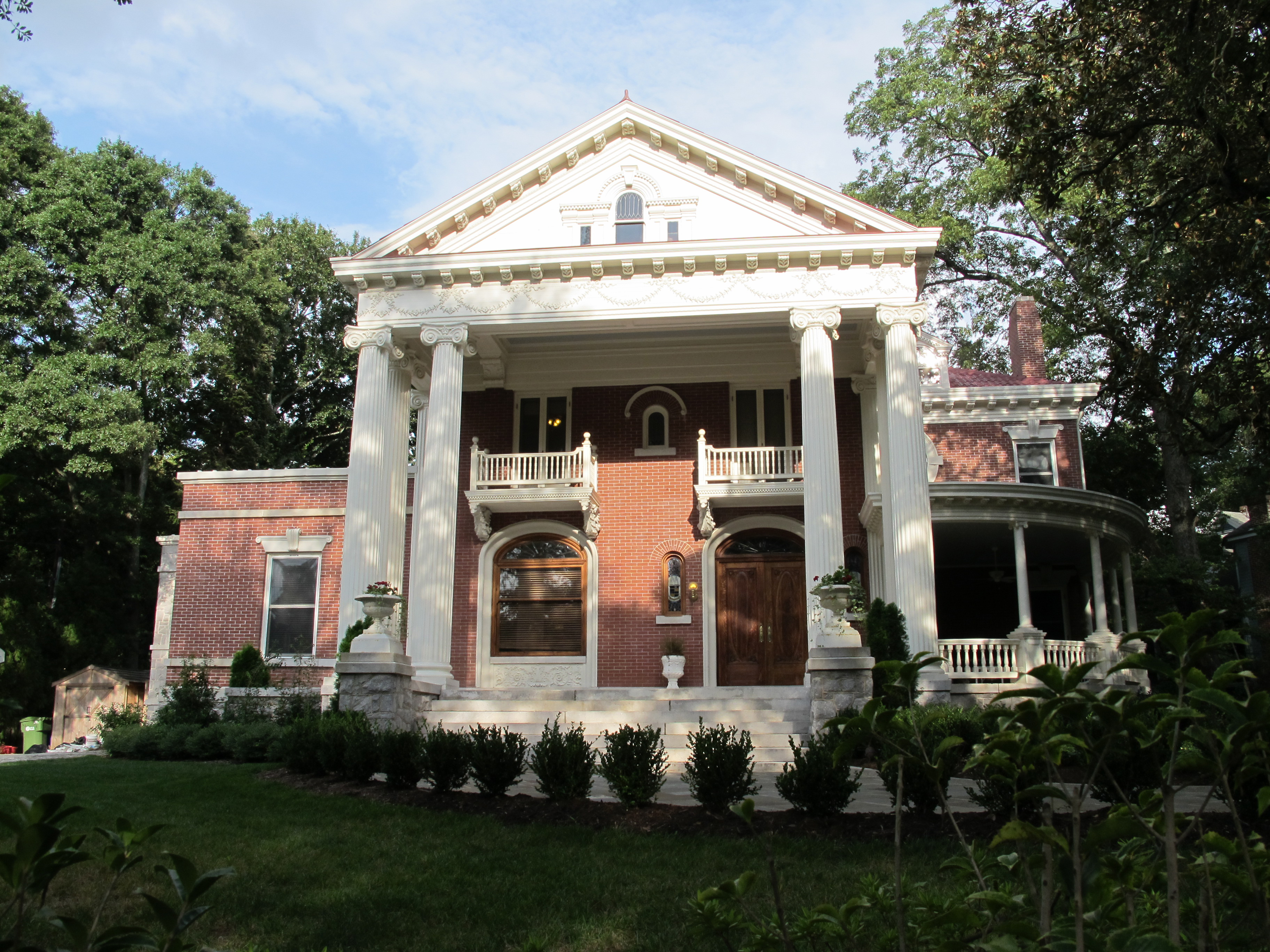
Callan Castle in Inman Park

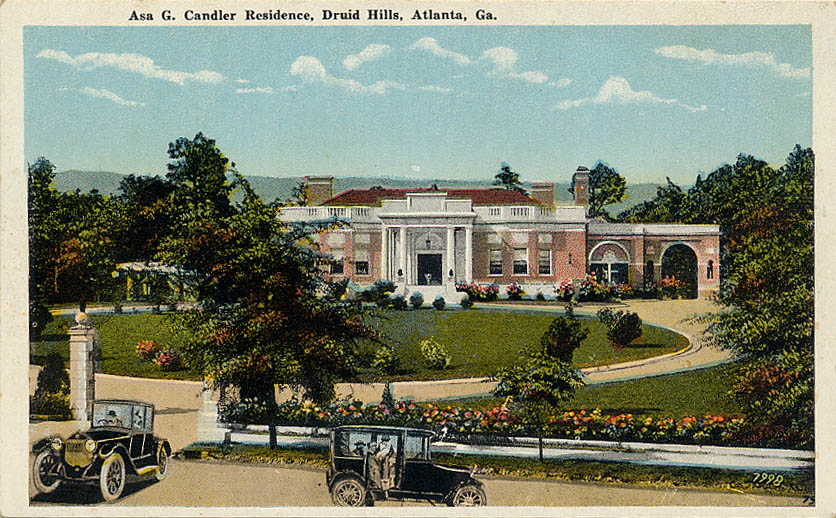
Candler mansion (built 1916) at 1500 Ponce de Leon Avenue in Druid Hills

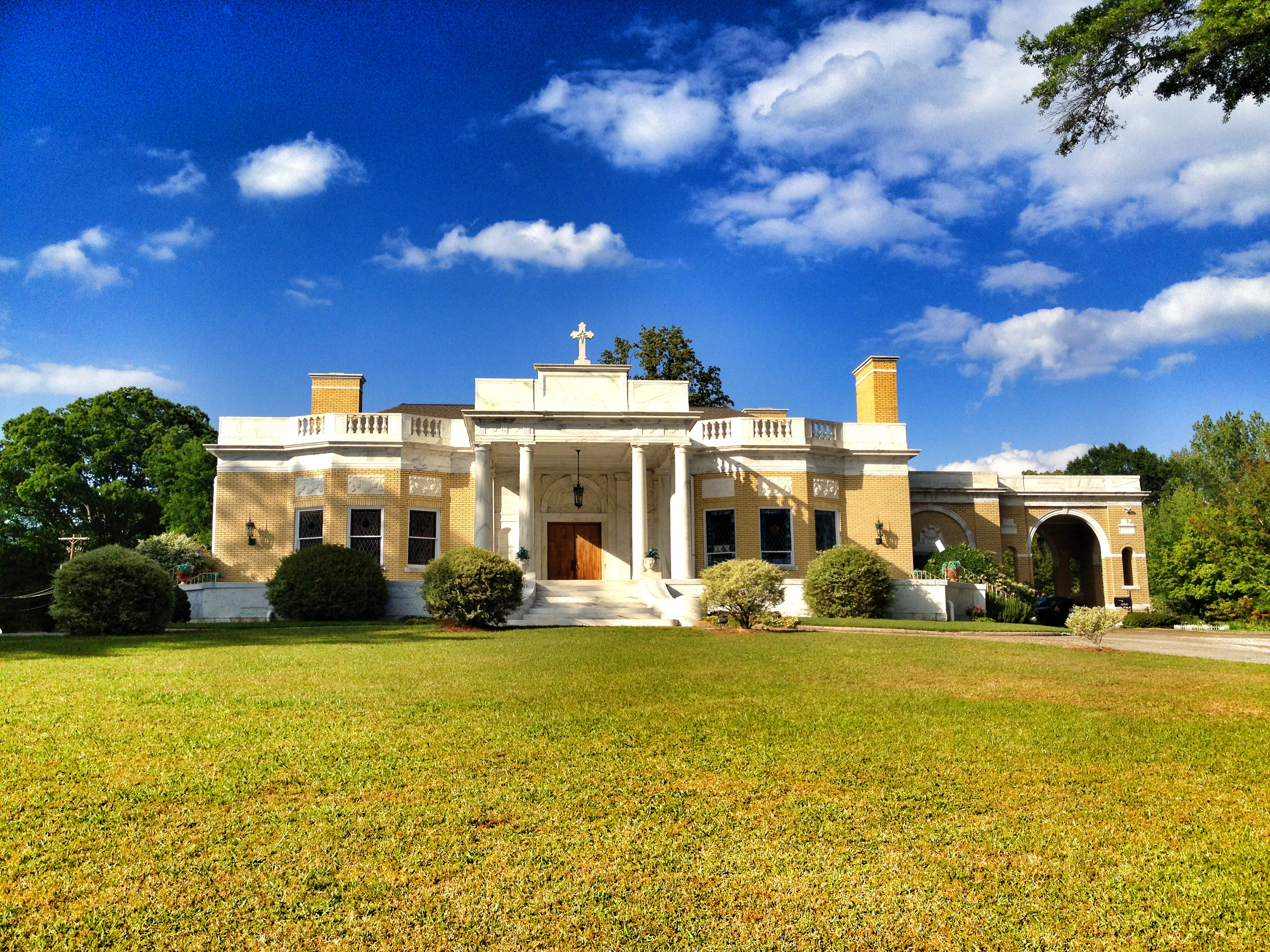
John Chrysostom Melkite Church, 2012

Several Candler buildings were constructed as the Coca-Cola Company expanded in the early 20th century:

- Baltimore, Maryland – The Candler Building, located on the northeast corner of East Pratt Street and Market Place in eastern downtown, at the Inner Harbor, still bears his name. The brick industrial style building faces the waterfront of the basin of Baltimore Harbor, on the Northwest Branch of the Patapsco River. Used as a regional headquarters for the Coca-Cola Bottling Company, the structure was known for having brass door knobs engraved with "CC" for the company. Between the late 1930s and 1960, the building served as the national headquarters of the new Social Security Administration. This agency was authorized under the Social Security Act of 1935, one of the New Deal programs of President Franklin D. Roosevelt. By the 2000s, as the old waterfront area and municipal piers area were being redeveloped from commercial and industrial uses, the Candler Building was renovated for offices and some apartments/condos.
- In Kansas City, the Western Auto Building was known as the Coca-Cola Building or Candler Building when constructed for the Coca-Cola Company in 1914, and during its occupancy. It has been converted to loft condominiums.
- In New York City, the Candler Building is still in use.

== See also ==
- Samuel Candler Dobbs, Asa Candler's cousin and president and chairman of The Coca-Cola Company

Preceded by James G. Woodward	Mayor of Atlanta; 1917–1919	Succeeded by James L. Key
