= Rainbow Terrace =

Historic mansion in Atlanta, Georgia

Coordinates: 33.7747°N 84.3348°W

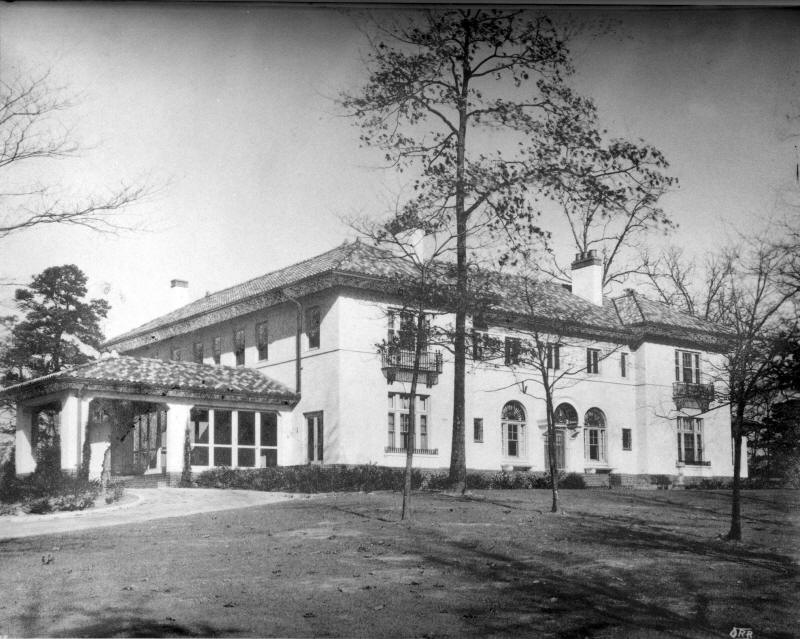
- Rainbow Terrace, 1922
- Location: 1610 Ponce de Leon Avenue, Druid Hills Historic District (Atlanta, Georgia)
- Architect: G. Lloyd Preacher

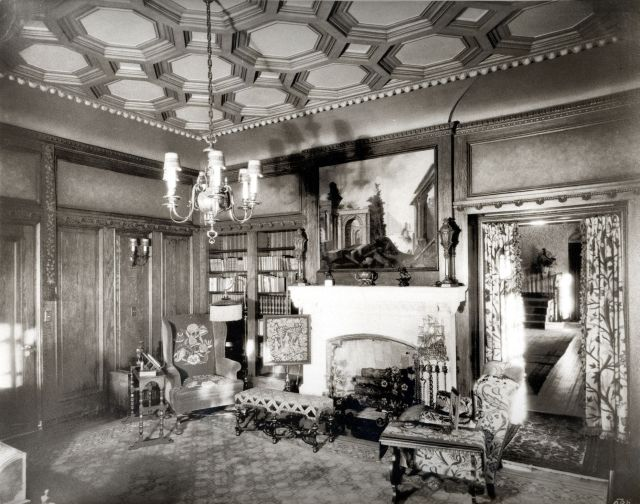
Rainbow Terrace library, 1922

Rainbow Terrace, now known as Lullwater Estate, is the Mediterranean-style Atlanta mansion built for Lucy Beall Candler Owens Heinz (1882–1962), daughter of Coca-Cola co-founder Asa Griggs Candler. The architect was G. Lloyd Preacher, the architect of Atlanta City Hall. It is located at what is now 1610 Ponce de Leon Avenue in the Druid Hills Historic District.

Henry Heinz was shot by a burglar at Rainbow Terrace in 1943. A domestic servant was convicted of the crime, but rumours persisted that a relative murdered him.

The mansion itself is now divided into condominiums, and is now surrounded by townhouses, all together forming a complex.
