= Metro Atlanta Chamber of Commerce =

The Metro Atlanta Chamber is a business organization working to expand a thriving economy and advocate for a competitive business climate for the Atlanta metropolitan area. It was founded in 1859.

== History ==
The first Atlanta Chamber of Commerce was founded in 1859, and was chiefly concerned with fighting railroad rate discrimination and with sustaining commercial ties with the North. After secession, it focused its attention on direct trade with Europe, which was part of an overall Southern goal of achieving economic independence from the North. In 1866 the chamber was reformed into a Board of Trade.

When the economy started to recover after the Civil War, in 1871 the city's business community formed a new Chamber of Commerce which was meant to have a broader base and participation than the Board of Trade. Again, the main issue was the railroads. Jonathan Norcross addressed the members at its first meeting. Benjamin Crane, a wholesale grocer, was the chamber's new president.

By 1890 the chamber had 600 members from 350 firms. In 1892 an auxiliary social club was started. The following year there was an economic panic, and the chamber was instrumental in encouraging banks to issue scrip in order to get more money into circulation, which allowed Atlanta merchants to sell the cotton crop. During the depression in the 1890s, the chamber took a position front and center as the spokesman for the welfare of the working man and for its business class and succeeded rallied the business community to stage the successful 1895 Cotton States and International Exposition, a sort of world's fair.

In 1899 the chamber began a Young Men's Business League. In 1903 it launched the Greater Georgia Association which promoted Atlanta and Georgia in western and northern business journals. The chamber also published numerous guides and picture books on Atlanta. In 1904 it pressured the city to establish an Atlanta Freight Bureau, which would suspend all concessions to the railroads until an agreement on freight rates was agreed to that was favorable to businesses. And in 1910 the Chamber successfully campaigned for a $3 million city bond which funded expansion of the water and sewer systems, Grady Hospital, and several new schools.

Today, the Metro Atlanta Chamber (MAC) serves as a catalyst for a more prosperous and vibrant region. The organization works to advance economic growth and improve metro Atlanta’s quality of life across the 29-county metro Atlanta region. MAC actively works in economic development to expand the region’s thriving economy, advocates for a competitive business climate, and leads efforts to develop talent pipelines throughout the metro region.

== Other chambers of commerce in Metro Atlanta ==
- List of international chambers of commerce in Atlanta
- French American Chamber of Commerce - Atlanta
- German American Chamber of Commerce
- Latin American Chamber of Commerce
- Netherlands American Chamber of Commerce - Southeastern United States
- Gwinnett Chamber of Commerce
