= Briarcliff =

Briarcliff, Briarcliffe or Briar Cliff may refer to:

== Places in the United States ==
- Briarcliff, Arkansas, a second-class city
- Briarcliff, more commonly known as North Druid Hills, Georgia, North Druid Hills, Georgi
- Briarcliff, Kansas City, Missouri, a residential neighborhood and shopping district
- Briarcliffe, a community in Darby Township, Pennsylvania
- Briarcliff, Seattle, a neighborhood of Seattle
- Briarcliff, Texas, a village

== Buildings in the United States ==
- The Briarcliffe, a residential building in Manhattan
- Briarcliff (mansion), Atlanta, Georgia, now the Briarcliff Campus of Emory University, on the National Register of Historic Places
- Briarcliff Hotel, an apartment building and former hotel in Atlanta, Georgia

== Businesses in the United States ==
- Briarcliff Entertainment, an independent film production and distribution company based in Santa Monica, California
- Briarcliff Farms, a dairy farm in the village and Pine Plains from 1890 to 1968
- Briarcliff Lodge, a historic resort in Briarcliff, demolished 2003
- Briarcliff Plaza, a historic shopping center in Atlanta, Georgia

== Schools in the United States ==
- Briar Cliff University, a private Franciscan university in Sioux City, Iowa
- Briarcliff College, Briarcliff Manor, New York, a women's college that closed in 1977
- Briarcliffe College, a private college in Long Island, New York
- Briarcliff High School (DeKalb County, Georgia), a high school that closed in 1987
- Briarcliff High School, Briarcliff, Manor, New York, a public school
- Briarcliff Middle School, Briarcliff Manor, New York, a public school

== Other uses ==
- USS Briarcliff, a US Navy freighter from 1919 to 1938
- A fictional abandoned mental institution in "Welcome to Briarcliff", an episode of American Horror Story

== See also ==
- Briarcliff Manor, New York, a village
- Briarcliffe Acres, South Carolina
