= Emory Grove =

Emory Grove may refer to:

- Emory Grove, retreat center located in the Glyndon Historic District, Glyndon, Maryland
- Emory Grove Line, bus route operated by the Maryland Transit Administration
- Emory Grove Historic District, historic district on the National Register of Historic Places in Druid Hills, Georgia
