= North Druid Hills, Georgia =

- Unincorporated community Census-designated place
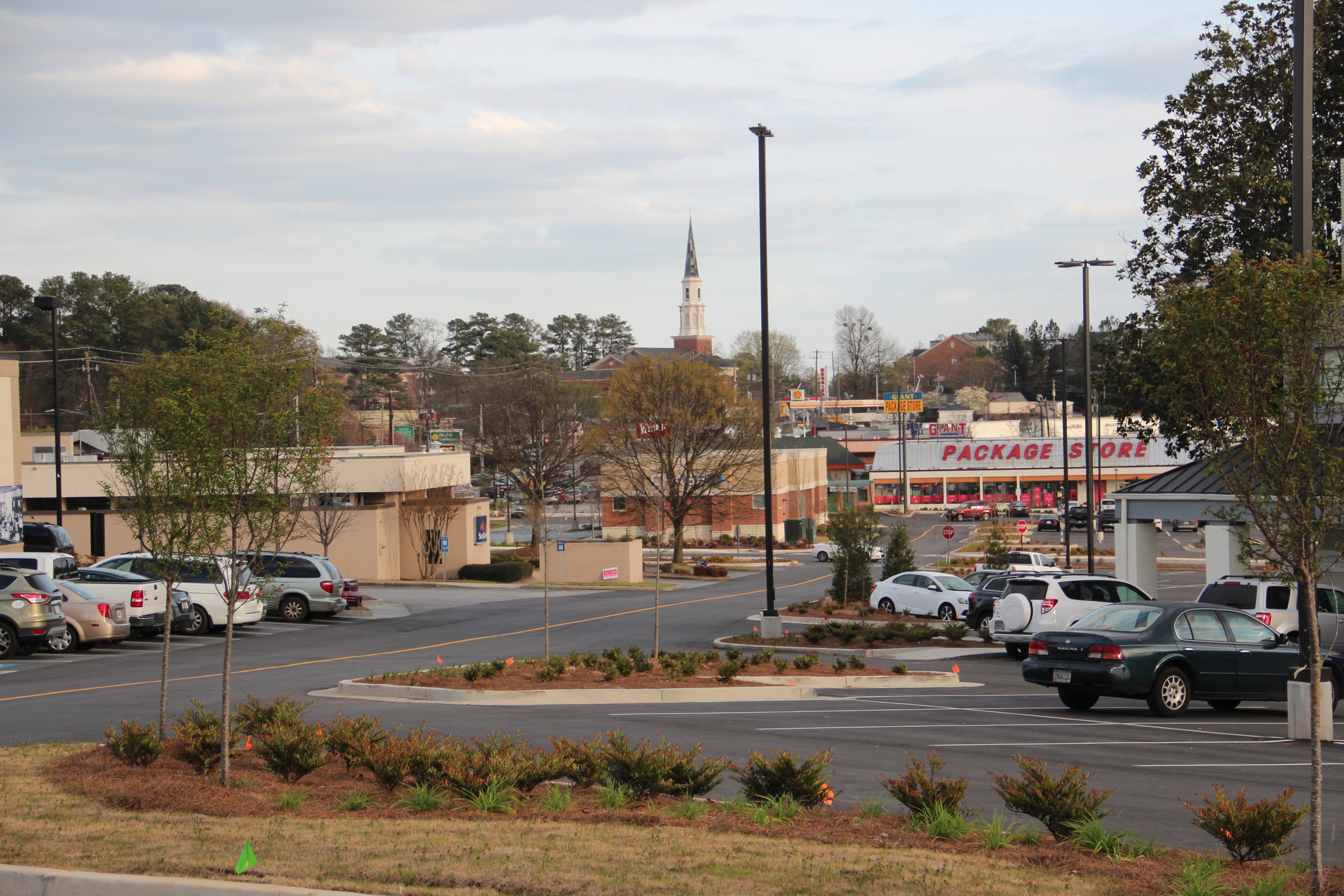
- Toco Hills Shopping Center

- Location in DeKalb County and the state of Georgia

- location within central Metro Atlanta
- Coordinates: 33°49′11″N 84°19′41″W
- Country: United States
- State: Georgia
- County: DeKalb

Area
  - Total: 4.46 sq mi (11.55 km^{2})
  - Land: 4.45 sq mi (11.53 km^{2})
  - Water: 0.0077 sq mi (0.02 km^{2})
- Elevation: 1,014 ft (309 m)

Population (2020)
  - Total: 20,385
  - Density: 4,580.5/sq mi (1,768.54/km^{2})
- Time zone: UTC-5 (Eastern (EST))
  - Summer (DST): UTC-4 (EDT)
- FIPS code: 13-56168
- GNIS feature ID: 1805271

North Druid Hills, also known as Briarcliff or Toco Hills, is an unincorporated community and census-designated place (North Druid Hills CDP) in DeKalb County, Georgia, United States. The population was 20,385 in 2020. The commercial center of the area is the Toco Hill Shopping Center, located near the intersection of North Druid Hills Road and LaVista Road.

== History ==
One of the earliest European settlers in north DeKalb County was Chapman Powell, whose "Medicine House" cabin was built near the intersection of Clairmont and North Decatur roads (later relocated to Stone Mountain Park, where it still stands). Dr. Powell (1798–1870) owned most of the land in the Candler Lake and South Fork Peachtree Creek area during his lifetime. His land was later purchased by Walter Candler.

Major Washington Jackson Houston owned land on the north side of the South Fork of Peachtree Creek, in what is now Briarcliff. Visitors used to visit Major Houston to buy ground cornmeal produced by his 1876 gristmill or to attend social gatherings held on his property. Major Houston converted the mill into an early hydroelectric plant circa 1900. Atlanta contractor Harry J. Carr bought Houston's land in the 1920s and constructed the fieldstone and wrought iron home now known as the Houston Mill House. Emory University purchased the home in the 1960s and renovated it. Houston Mill House, located at 849 Houston Mill Road, is now open for dining and special events.

After World War II and continuing into the 1950s, many Jews moved out of Washington-Rawson, where Turner Field now stands, and the Old Fourth Ward into North Druid Hills and Morningside/Lenox Park. Congregation Beth Jacob, an orthodox synagogue, moved to LaVista Road in 1962, and the neighborhood has since become a hub of Orthodox Judaism for the Atlanta area with three Jewish schools, six congregations and a mikveh located along or near LaVista Road.

The community is also home to one of the largest Greek Orthodox congregations in the Southeast, and they have a large complex in the area which includes the Annunciation Greek Orthodox Cathedral (Atlanta) that serves as the seat of the Archbishop of the Greek Orthodox Metropolis of Atlanta. The church hosts the annual Atlanta Greek Festival as well.

Additionally there is a large community of East Africans in the community, with a relatively large population of people of Ethiopian descent.

The North Druid Hills CDP remained rural until 1965, when Executive Park was constructed on a former dairy farm as the first suburban office park in metropolitan Atlanta. Following the completion of Executive Park, the area boomed with suburban development. The 19-story Executive Park Motor Hotel, built in the 1970s at the southeast corner of I-85 and North Druid Hills Road and which later served as a BellSouth training center, was a modernist landmark until its demolition in November 2014 after being purchased by Children's Healthcare of Atlanta for $9.6 million in January 2013.

=== Incorporation movement ===
Following the incorporation of Brookhaven in 2012, the idea of incorporating a city of Briarcliff was proposed by a civic group known as the North Druid Hills Study Group. Supporters cited more local control as reasons in favor of cityhood, while those against cityhood cited the lack of an identity, center, and boundaries as reasons against. The city of Briarcliff boundaries would be:

- I-85 on the north
- I-285 on the east,
- on the south, the cities of Decatur and Avondale Estates; unincorporated DeKalb county, as well as the Druid Hills neighborhood of the City of Atlanta, keeping in mind that unincorporated Druid Hills and the Emory University area would be part of Briarcliff
- City of Atlanta (Virginia-Highland, Morningside-Lenox Park and Lindridge-Martin Manor neighborhoods) on the west.

In March 2014 after failure of the first initiative the City of Briarcliff Initiative, Inc. announced plans for a second attempt at cityhood, which it dubbed "Briarcliff 2.0".

In 2015 a voter initiative to incorporate the same area under the name "LaVista Hills" failed by a margin of 136 votes of the approximately 14,000 total votes cast.

== Geography ==
North Druid Hills is located at 33°49′11″N 84°19′41″W.

According to the United States Census Bureau, the CDP has a total area of 5.0 square miles (13 km^{2}), of which 0.20% is water. The CDP boundaries are:

- Interstate 85 to the north, across which is the Buford Highway corridor and the city of Brookhaven
- Clairmont Road and the North Decatur CDP and city of Decatur to the east
- the South Fork of Peachtree Creek and the Druid Hills CDP to the south, and
- the DeKalb County boundary with the city of Atlanta to the west

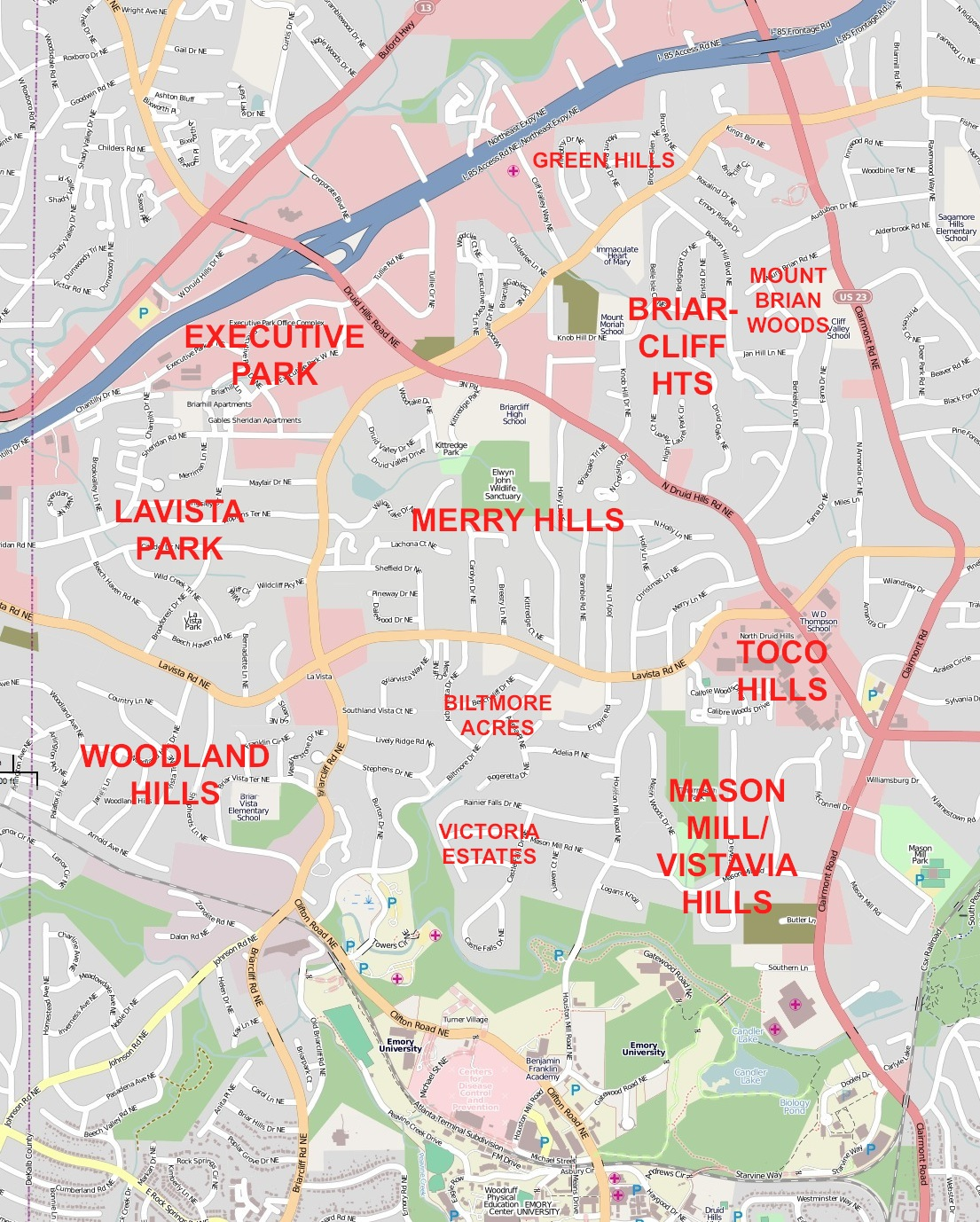
North Druid Hills neighborhoods

=== Neighborhoods ===
- Biltmore Acres. South of LaVista Rd., west of Houston Mill Rd. & north of the South Branch of Peachtree Creek.
- Briarcliff Heights. NW of Mount Brian Woods.
- Green Hills. North of Briarcliff Rd. & south of I-85.
- LaVista Park. East of DeKalb/Fulton line and west of Briarcliff Road.
- Merry Hills. Between LaVista Rd. & North Druid Hills Rd.
- Mount Brian Woods. North of North Druid Hills Rd., NW of LaVista Rd. & west of Clairmont Rd.
- Sheridan Court. In CDP NW corner, around Sheridan Drive.
- Woodland Hills. South of LaVista Road between Briarcliff Road & DeKalb County boundary.
- Mason Mill. South of North Druid Hills Road & LaVista Road, between Clairmont Road & Houston Mill.
- Vistavia Hills. On Vistavia Circle between Clairmont Road & Mason Woods Drive.
- Executive Park. Developed in the early 1970s as one of Atlanta's first mixed-use developments; located at I-85 and North Druid Hills Road.
- Fama Pines. Consisting of the long dead end Fama Drive and the smaller Jacolyn Place spur, The entrance to Fama Pines is due north of the LaVista Road and N. Druid Hills intersection. Active since the 1950s.

==== Toco Hills ====
Toco Hills is a large commercial and residential neighborhood in the eastern portion of the North Druid Hills CDP. The commercial component consists of two major shopping centers that are located at the intersection of LaVista and North Druid Hills roads that were developed in the 1950s. While it is generally accepted that the name "Toco Hills" is derived from the Toco Hill shopping center, the origin of that name is disputed. Some sources claim that the developer chose the name Toco because it was the Brazilian Indian word for "good luck." Other sources claim Toco is an informal abbreviation of "top of the County." In any case, the shopping center was developed on what was a hill, and the name gradually changed to "Toco Hills." The area is home to a large Orthodox Jewish population, and marked by wooded subdivisions featuring mostly ranch homes surrounding the commercial area.

== Demographics ==
Historical population
Census	Pop.	Note	%±
1980	12,438		—
1990	14,170		13.9%
2000	18,852		33.0%
2010	18,947		0.5%
2020	20,385		7.6%
U.S. Decennial Census; 1850-1870 1870-1880; 1890-1910 1920-1930; 1940 1950 1960; 1970 1980 1990; 2000 2010 2020

North Druid Hills was first listed as a census designated place in the 1980 U.S. census.

=== Racial and ethnic composition ===
North Druid Hills, Georgia – Racial and ethnic composition Note: the US Census treats Hispanic/Latino as an ethnic category. This table excludes Latinos from the racial categories and assigns them to a separate category. Hispanics/Latinos may be of any race.
Race / Ethnicity (NH = Non-Hispanic)	Pop 2000	Pop 2010	Pop 2020	% 2000	% 2010	% 2020
White alone (NH)	15,008	12,228	12,416	76.91%	64.54%	60.91%
Black or African American alone (NH)	1,363	2,354	2,735	7.23%	12.42%	13.42%
Native American or Alaska Native alone (NH)	26	38	37	0.14%	0.20%	0.18%
Asian alone (NH)	1,266	2,110	2,109	6.72%	11.14%	10.35%
Pacific Islander alone (NH)	6	4	8	0.03%	0.02%	0.04%
Other race alone (NH)	84	45	186	0.45%	0.24%	0.91%
Mixed race or Multiracial (NH)	284	324	828	1.51%	1.71%	4.06%
Hispanic or Latino (any race)	815	1,844	2,066	4.32%	9.73%	10.13%
Total	18,852	18,947	20,385	100.00%	100.00%	100.00%

=== 2020 census ===
As of the 2020 census, North Druid Hills had a population of 20,385, with 10,079 households and 3,215 families. The median age was 33.1 years. 14.3% of residents were under the age of 18 and 14.4% of residents were 65 years of age or older. For every 100 females there were 92.8 males, and for every 100 females age 18 and over there were 91.1 males age 18 and over.

100.0% of residents lived in urban areas, while 0.0% lived in rural areas.

Of the 10,079 households in North Druid Hills, 16.2% had children under the age of 18 living in them. Of all households, 30.0% were married-couple households, 26.4% were households with a male householder and no spouse or partner present, and 34.9% were households with a female householder and no spouse or partner present. About 41.6% of all households were made up of individuals and 10.3% had someone living alone who was 65 years of age or older.

There were 10,993 housing units, of which 8.3% were vacant. The homeowner vacancy rate was 1.9% and the rental vacancy rate was 9.2%.

Racial composition as of the 2020 census
Race	Number	Percent
White	12,743	62.5%
Black or African American	2,803	13.8%
American Indian and Alaska Native	100	0.5%
Asian	2,121	10.4%
Native Hawaiian and Other Pacific Islander	8	0.0%
Some other race	935	4.6%
Two or more races	1,675	8.2%
Hispanic or Latino (of any race)	2,066	10.1%

== Government and infrastructure ==
The United States Postal Service operates the Druid Hills Post Office at 1799 Briarcliff Road NE in the CDP. The area uses an Atlanta, GA city designation for mailing purposes.

== Diplomatic missions ==
The Consulate-General of Mexico in Atlanta is in the North Druid Hills CDP.

== Education ==
DeKalb County Schools serves the CDP. Briar Vista Elementary School, the zoned school of most of North Druid Hills, is in the CDP. Some portions are served by Sagamore Hills Elementary School. Residents in North Druid Hills are also zoned to Druid Hills Middle School (in North Decatur CDP) and Druid Hills High School (in Druid Hills CDP).

The Margaret Harris Comprehensive School, an alternative K-12 county school for disabled children, is in North Druid Hills.

Parochial schools: The Roman Catholic Archdiocese of Atlanta operates the Immaculate Heart of Mary School, a parochial school, at 2855 Briarcliff Road in the CDP. The school initially had 238 pupils when it opened in August 1958. An addition was installed in circa the late 1960s/early 1970s.

Private schools:

- Annunciation Day School (ADS), at the Greek Orthodox Cathedral, 2500 Clairmont Road, NE. Private Greek Orthodox Christian pre-school. Private Greek Orthodox Christian elementary school (K-8).
- Atlanta Montessori International School, 1970 Cliff Valley Way. Private pre-school - middle school.
- Cliff Valley School, 2426 Clairmont Rd. Private elementary school.
- Intown Community School, 2059 LaVista Rd. Private PCA-affiliated school.
- Bridgepoint Preschool, 1995 Clairmont Rd. Private Bridgepoint Church at Toco Hills-affiliated school.
- Torah Day School of Atlanta, 1985 Lavista Road NE. Private K-8 Orthodox Jewish day school
- Yeshiva Ohr Yisrael, 1458 Holly Lane. Private Orthodox Jewish boys high school.
- Temima High School, 1985-B Lavista Road. Private Orthodox Jewish girls high school

The Southern Association of Colleges and Schools Commission on Colleges is headquartered in North Druid Hills.

== Culture ==
The Greek Orthodox Archdiocese of America Metropolis of Atlanta is headquartered in North Druid Hills.

== Parks ==
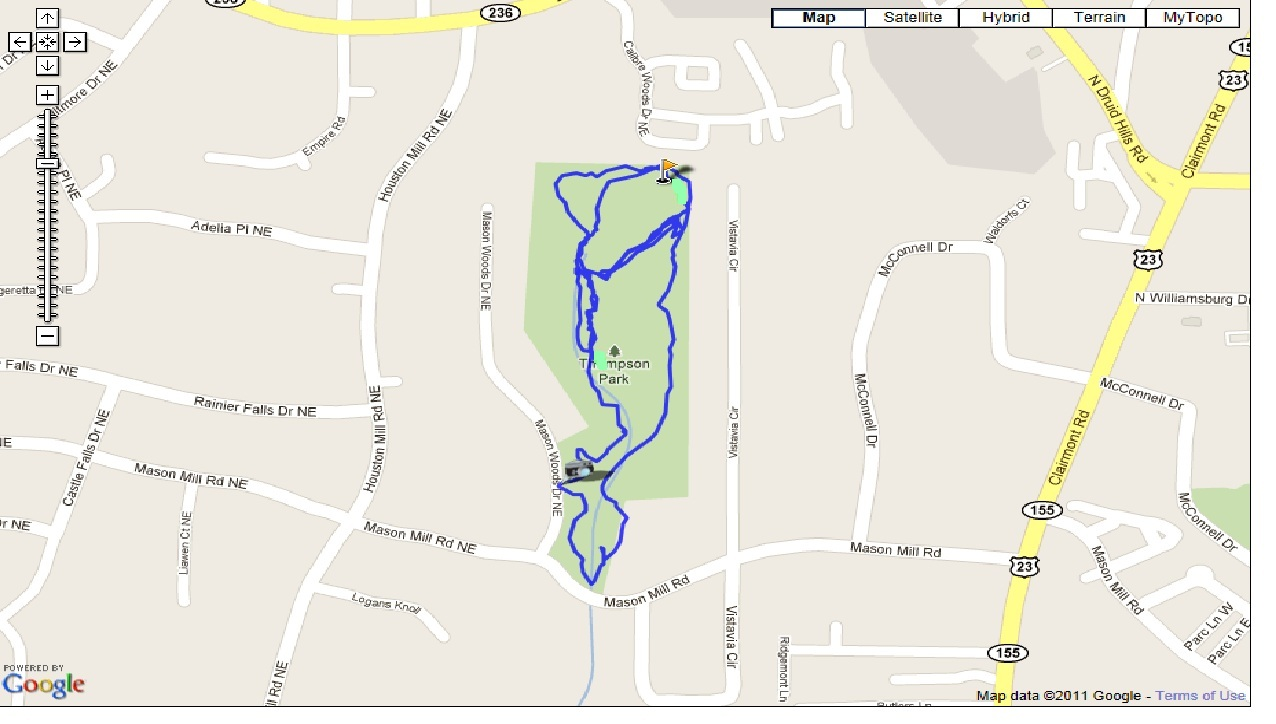
W.D. Thomson Park Trail Map

- Kittredge Park, 1520 Kittredge Park Rd., 2-acre (8,100 m^{2}) park with baseball field, pool and multi-use court.
- LaVista Park, 1319 Brookforest Dr., 4-acre (16,000 m^{2}) DeKalb County park with playground and picnic area.
- W.D. Thomson Park, [often misspelled "Thompson"] 1760 Mason Mill Rd. (off Mason Woods Drive), 29-acre (120,000 m^{2}) DeKalb County park with courts, playground, creek, picnic area and trails.

== Transportation ==
- Briarcliff Rd. Major road unifying the CDP.
- Interstate 85. CDP northern boundary.
- LaVista Rd. Primary E-W road.
- North Druid Hills Rd. Primary access from Interstate 85.
