= Georgia Mental Health Institute =

- State of Georgia
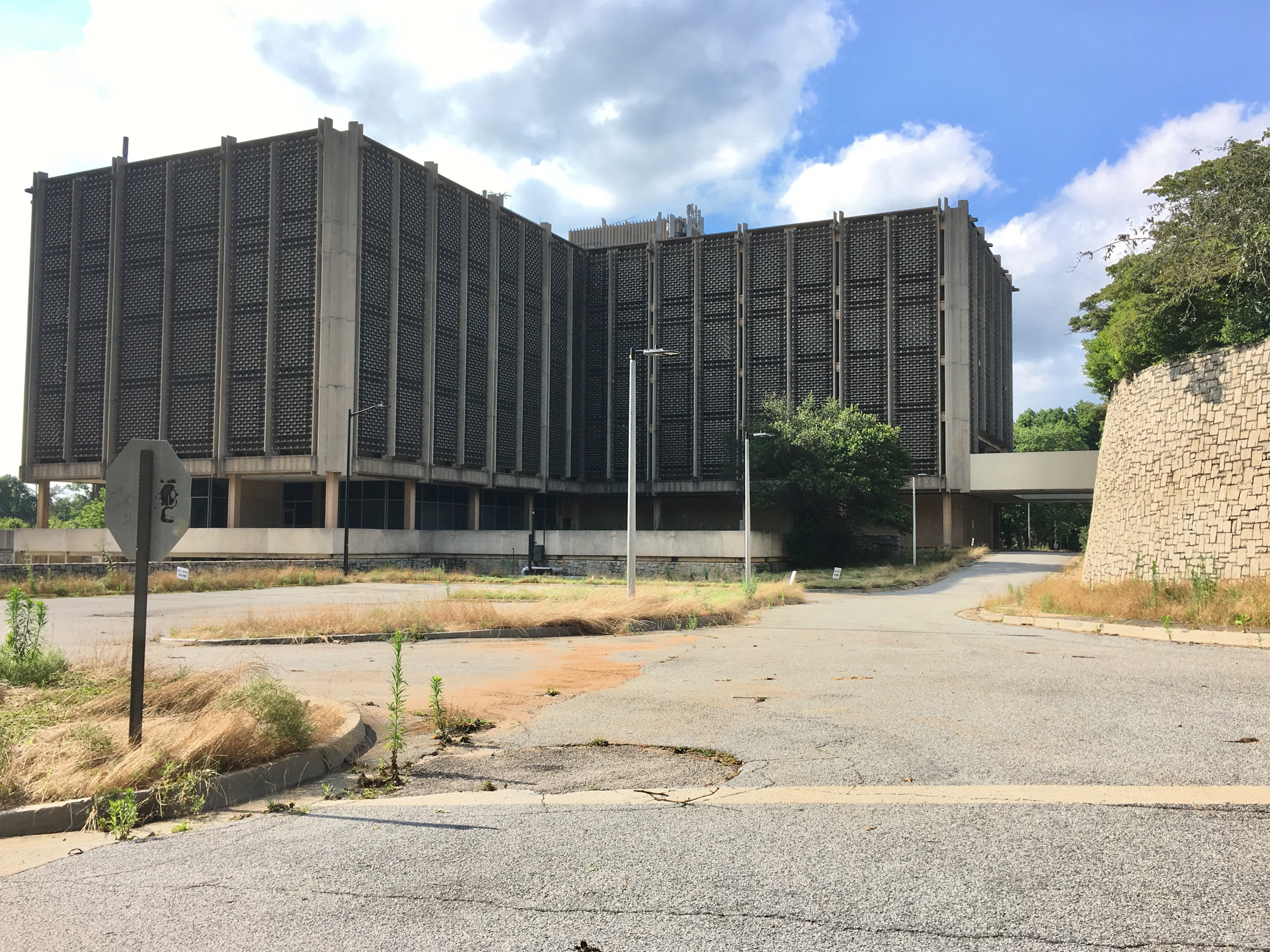
- GMHI in 2018

Geography
- Location: Atlanta, Georgia, United States
- Coordinates: 33°47′18.8″N 84°20′32.6″W

Organization
- Type: Specialist
- Affiliated university: Emory University

Services
- Specialty: Psychiatric hospital, Teaching hospital

Helipads
- Helipad: No

History
- Founded: 1965
- Closed: 1997

Links
- Lists: Hospitals in Georgia

The Georgia Mental Health Institute (GMHI) was a psychiatric hospital which operated from 1965 to 1997 near Emory University in Druid Hills, Atlanta, Georgia. It was located on the grounds of the Briarcliff Estate, the former residence of Asa G. Candler, Jr., the son of the founder of Coca-Cola.

== History ==
Emory and the state of Georgia jointly developed the GMHI. Emory doctors provided some of the mental health services at GMHI, and some residents and fellows received part of their training in psychiatry there. Emory also had its own pediatric psychiatric outpatient programs based at the facility. The university also had 10 faculty scientists conducting 18 research studies at GMHI, focused on mental health, brain and central nervous system diseases. At its closing it had 141 beds and a $24.5 million budget. Due to rising costs, the Georgia Department of Human Resources proposed that the hospital close. They decided that they could send GMHI patients to other hospitals nearby and use the $24.5 million budget in other community mental health services.

After the institute closed, the 42-acre campus was purchased by Emory University from the state of Georgia for $2.9 million. The university planned to turn the property into a biotechnology research and business development center. Unofficially the campus was referred to as "Emory West", and the university considered either renovating the existing 17 buildings or constructing new ones. Plans for the second campus were scaled back after faculty expressed a desire to remain at the main campus, but the university still planned to build the EmTech Bio Sciences Center as of 2000.

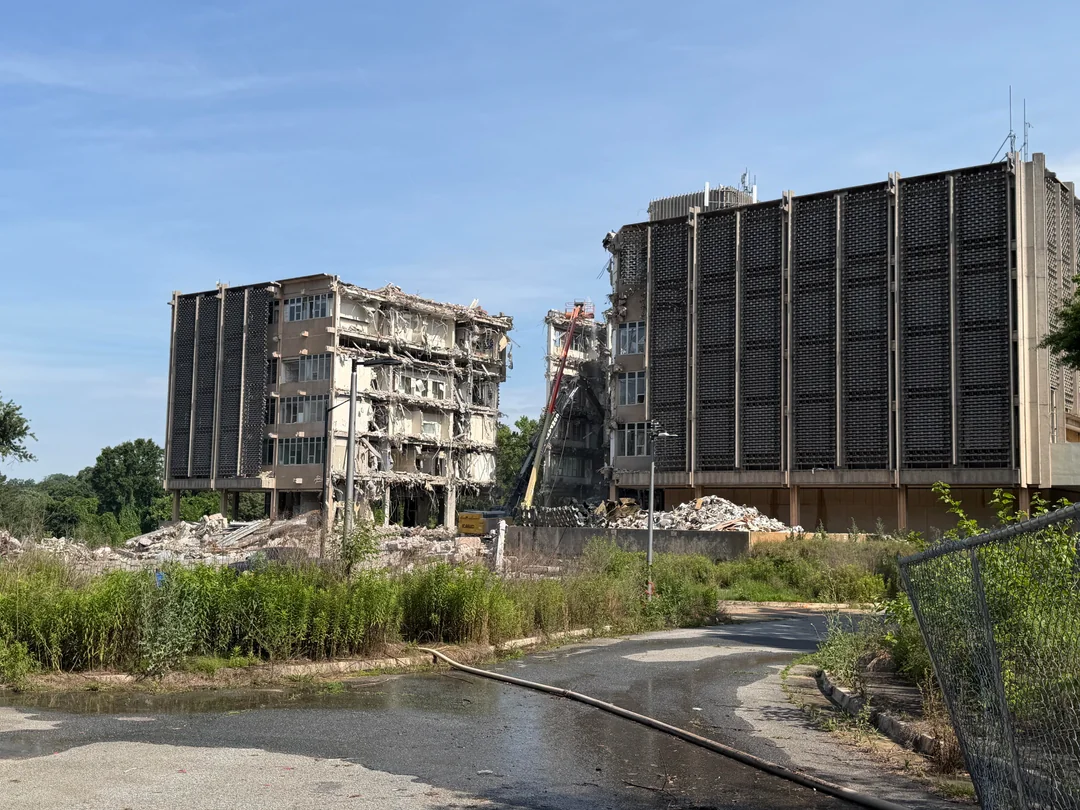
Demolition in progress in June 2026

In 2022, Emory University leased the property for 99 years to a private developer, Galerie Living who plans to redevelop the property as a senior living community. Due to this. all former hospital buildings on the campus were set for demolition, which is ongoing as of June 2026.

== In popular culture ==
The Netflix series Stranger Things used the Georgia Mental Health Institute as a filming location for the in-universe location "Hawkins National Laboratory".

The building was used as a filming location in the 2017 film Rings.

The Institute appears in Alex Garland's Civil War, where it is the scene of a fight between militiamen and loyalists.

The building appears briefly as an exterior shot of a hospital in the 2024 film Elevation.

DC's Doom Patrol takes place at "The Briarcliff" (mansion) next door and they briefly show the façade and shoot in front of it for a few scenes.

The Vampire Diaries was filmed here.

The building was also used as the sole filming location in Evan Scolnick's Background Action, where an anxious superhero movie production assistant must overcome trouble working with eccentric background actors.
