= Annunciation Greek Orthodox Cathedral =

Annunciation Greek Orthodox Cathedral may refer to:

- Annunciation Greek Orthodox Cathedral (Atlanta)
- Annunciation Greek Orthodox Cathedral (Houston)
- Annunciation Greek Orthodox Cathedral of New England
