= Emory Grove Historic District =

Historic district in Georgia, United States

- U.S. National Register of Historic Places
- U.S. Historic district
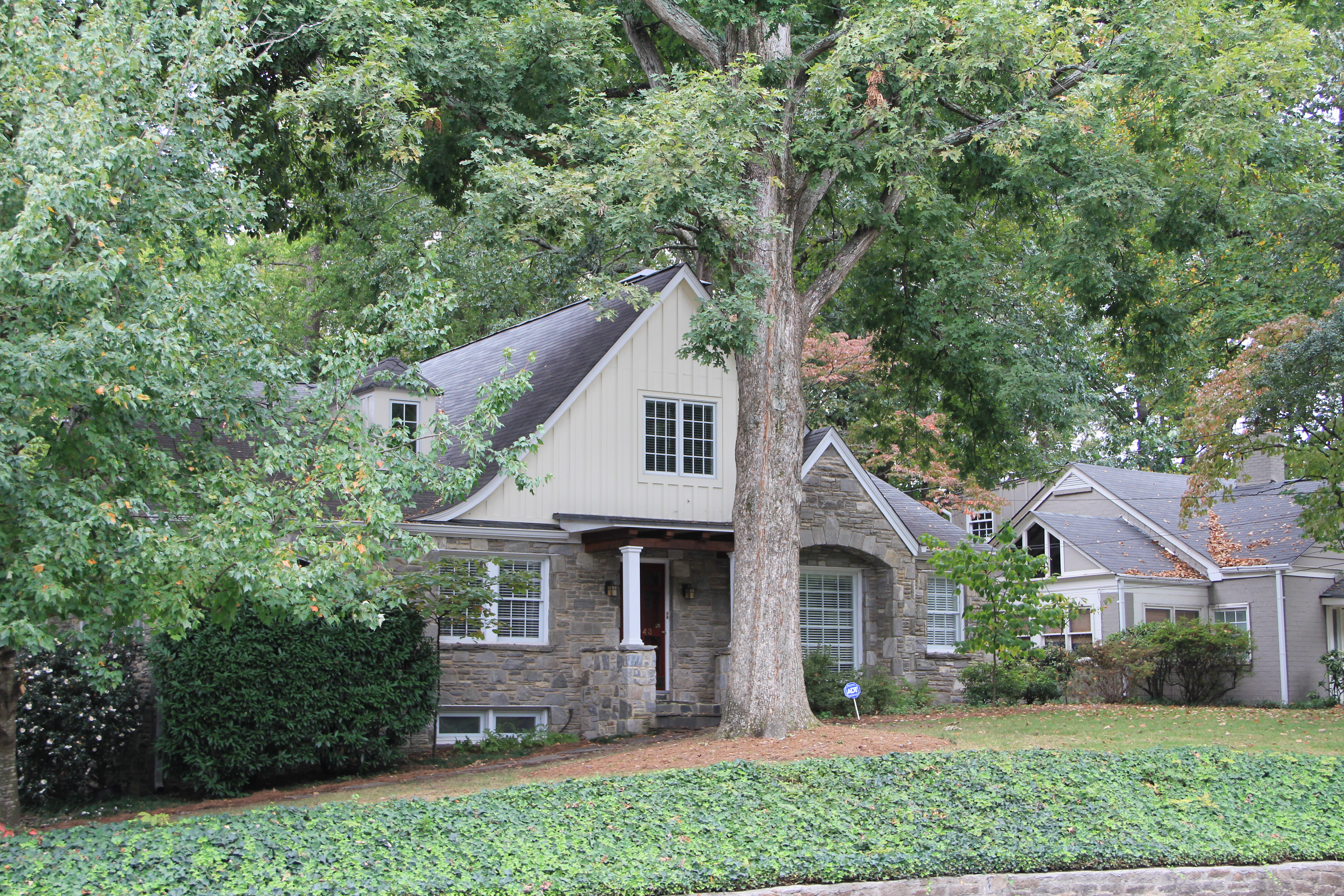

- Location within Atlanta Location within Georgia Location within the United States
- Nearest city: Decatur, Georgia
- Coordinates: 33°47′38″N 84°18′54″W
- Area: 90 acres (36 ha)
- Built: 1938
- Architect: Ivey and Crook; Robert and Company
- Architectural style: Colonial Revival, Late Gothic Revival
- NRHP reference No.: 00000300
- Added to NRHP: March 31, 2000

Emory Grove is a small area of bungalow style homes built in 1939 and the 1940s in Druid Hills, Georgia near Emory University. The Emory Grove Historic District, located between Emory University and the city of Decatur, Georgia, is a 90-acre (36 ha) historic district that was listed on the National Register of Historic Places in 2000.

The district has 200 contributing buildings, 4 contributing sites and one other contributing structure. It includes work by architects and/or builders Ivey and Crook and Robert and Company in Colonial Revival and Late Gothic Revival architectural styles.

The neighborhood includes single dwellings, Druid Hills High School, Emory Presbyterian Church, and Emory Spanish Academy.

Emory Grove consists of Princeton Way, Westminster Way, and Edinburgh Terrace, and a small amount of houses along N. Decatur Road.

== See also ==
- Druid Hills Historic District
- University Park-Emory Highlands-Emory Estates Historic District
