= Briarcliff (mansion) =

- U.S. National Register of Historic Places
- U.S. Historic district
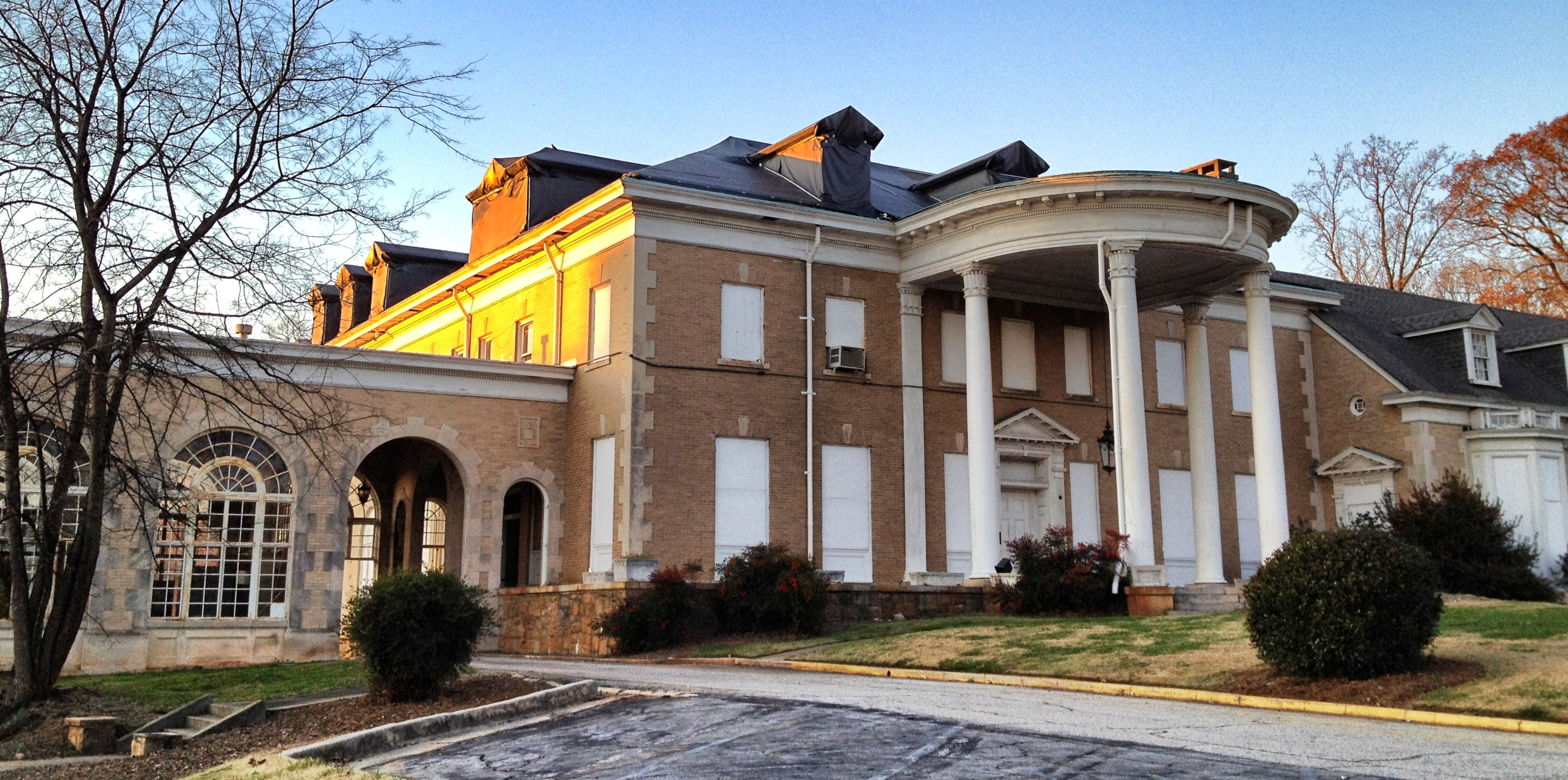
- Briarcliff mansion in disrepair, 2012

- Location within Atlanta Location within Georgia Location within the United States
- Location: 1260 Briarcliff Rd., NE, Atlanta, Georgia, US
- Coordinates: 33°47′22″N 84°20′27″W
- Built: 1922
- Architect: Frazier, Charles E.
- Architectural style: Colonial Revival, Georgian Revival
- NRHP reference No.: 88001167
- Added to NRHP: August 4, 1988

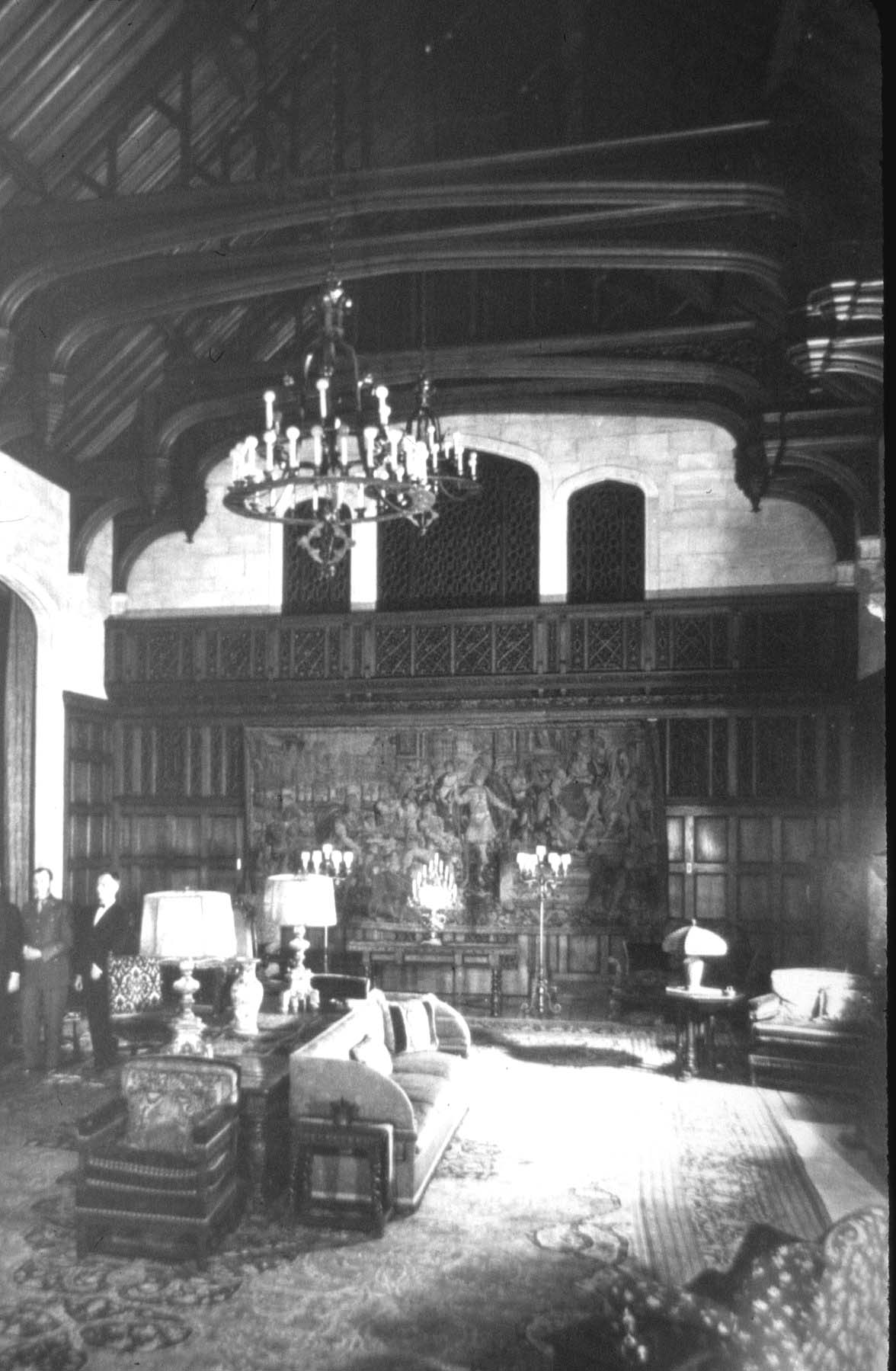
Music room at Briarcliff

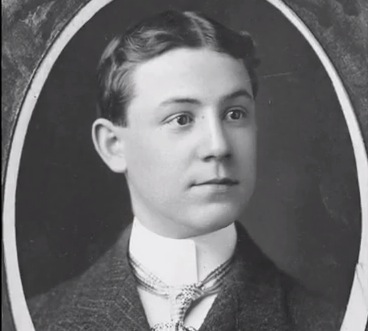
Asa G. Candler Jr.

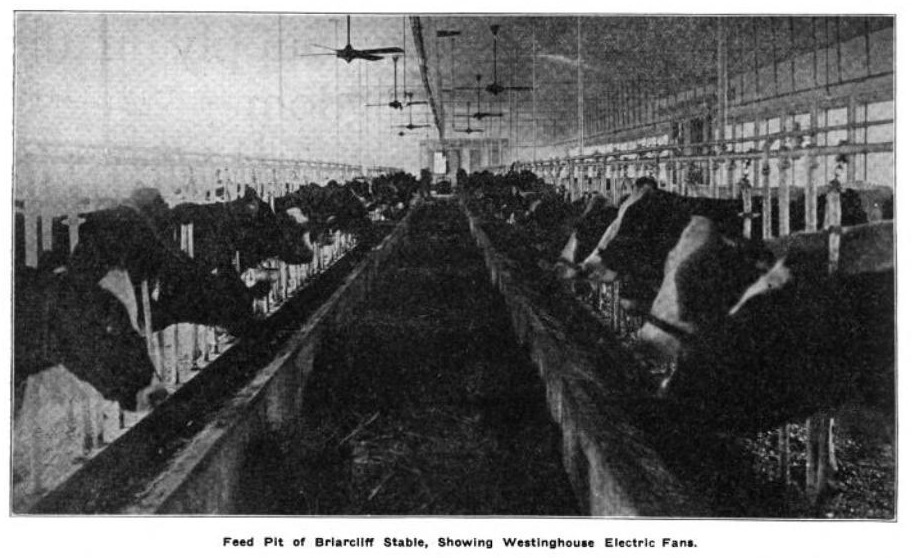
Briarcliff Farm in 1918

Briarcliff was the mansion and estate of Asa Griggs "Buddie" Candler Jr. (1880–1953), and is now the Briarcliff Campus of Emory University. The estate was built in 1922 on 42 acres on Williams Mill Road, now Briarcliff Road in Druid Hills near Atlanta. Williams Mill Road would be renamed Briarcliff Road in the 1920s after the estate that Asa Jr. would build there. It was listed on the National Register of Historic Places in 1988.

Asa Jr. was the eccentric son of Asa Griggs Candler, co-founder of Coca-Cola. Candler Jr. helped build his father's business into an empire. He later became a real-estate developer, opening the Briarcliff Hotel at the corner of Ponce de Leon Avenue and N. Highland Ave. in Atlanta's Virginia Highland neighborhood.

== Beginnings as Briarcliff Farm ==
In 1910, Asa Jr. moved from the fashionable Inman Park neighborhood where his father also had a mansion, to a "ramshackle" farmhouse on Briarcliff Farm, 42 acres (17 ha). The farm was just north of Callanwolde, his brother Charles' estate. Asa Jr. managed a huge agricultural operation which provided meat and produce to local retailers. Cows, sheep, pigs and chickens were raised on the farm. During World War I, Briarcliff Farm supplied milk to Fort Gordon.

The farm was lauded for its use of electric lights and fans, even individual drinking fountains for the cows, its cleanliness, air and light, resulting in sanitary conditions that led to higher yields and quality.

== Construction ==
Briarcliff was built between 1920 and 1922, and featured a Georgian Revival exterior. Architect Dan Bodin assisted Frazier in overseeing the completion. In 1925, Candler had the mansion enlarged, including the music room.

== Features of the estate ==
Features of the mansion included:

- 1,700 square feet (160 m^{2}) music room, now DeOvies Hall, with its three-story-tall vaulted Tudor interior, limestone fireplace and painted walls.
- Entrance hall
- Panelled library
- Living room
- Kitchen large enough for commercial restaurant equipment
- Breakfast room
- Dining room
- Second dining room that seats 75 people, panelled with carved ceilings and mouldings and fireplace of carved white European marble, and sterling silver chandeliers and candelabra
- Solarium with high ceilings a fish pond, and two oil murals painted by a friend of Asa at either end of the room. Only one of these remain.
- Additional solarium on the far side of the porte cochere built for the wedding of his daughter where the ceremony took place.
- Seven bedrooms including two masters each with a carved marble fireplace. The second master was used as a sitting room after the addition of the music room in 1925 due to the presence of the balcony which overlooked the music room.
- Another pond in the back courtyard
- The ballroom, a huge room on the third floor, painted in gold-leaf with access by stairs, and bathroom with three showers, three sinks and three toilets
- Basement including a large walk-in safe
- Red tile roof (which has been replaced with asphalt for the home's protection) and copper gutters

The estate included:

- Main house
- Servants' quarters
- Tennis courts
- Stables
- Greenhouses
- Laundry
- Zoo buildings
- Golf course
- Community pool

=== Aeolian organ ===
His father and older brother owned Aeolian organs, and to outdo them, in 1925 Candler had a $94,000, 88-rank, 187-stop, cathedral-sized Aeolian installed in the music room. It was the largest privately owned organ in Georgia at the time, and the 8th largest that Aeolian had ever built for a private residence. It was inaugurated in November 1925 in a recital by family friend Palmer Christian, which was broadcast over radio station WSB. In 1952 the organ was given to Wesleyan College in Macon, Georgia. It was renovated in 2008 and is now known as the Goodwyn-Candler-Panoz organ.

=== Menagerie of exotic animals ===
Candler collected exotic birds and animals in a menagerie held at his estate with cages designed by architect Bodin. The collection included a Bengal tiger, four lions, a black leopard, a gorilla, baboons, and six elephants: Coca, Cola, Pause, Refreshes, Refreshing and Delicious. In 1935, Candler, in financial trouble, put up his pipe organ for sale. A neighbor sued and won a $10,000 settlement because "a baboon jumped over the wall of the zoo and devoured $60 in currency out of her purse". He gave away his entire menagerie of animals to the Grant Park Zoo, now Zoo Atlanta.

The mansion also included two swimming pools, one open to the public for 25 cents per person. The pool had a neon-lighted fountain that was lit at night. The pool area was landscaped with flowers and shrubs. There was a stand to buy Coca-Cola and snacks.

== Sale of estate and later uses ==
The Candlers sold their estate to the General Services Administration in 1948. The planned veterans' hospital never emerged, and the estate was used to house the Georgian Clinic (later the DeKalb County Addiction Center), which opened in 1953 as the first alcohol treatment facility in Georgia. The clinic kept the pool open for its patients until the late 1950s, then closed it for lack of funds.

From 1965 to 1997, the estate housed the Georgia Mental Health Institute in a multi-story tower surrounded by multiple cottages connected by tunnels.

There are reports of hauntings at the estate.

The complex is now the Briarcliff Campus of Emory University, but the mansion remains empty and in disrepair.

The mansion is a location for the TV show Doom Patrol according to a making-of extra on the season one Blu-ray.
