= North Decatur, Georgia =

- Unincorporated community Census-designated place
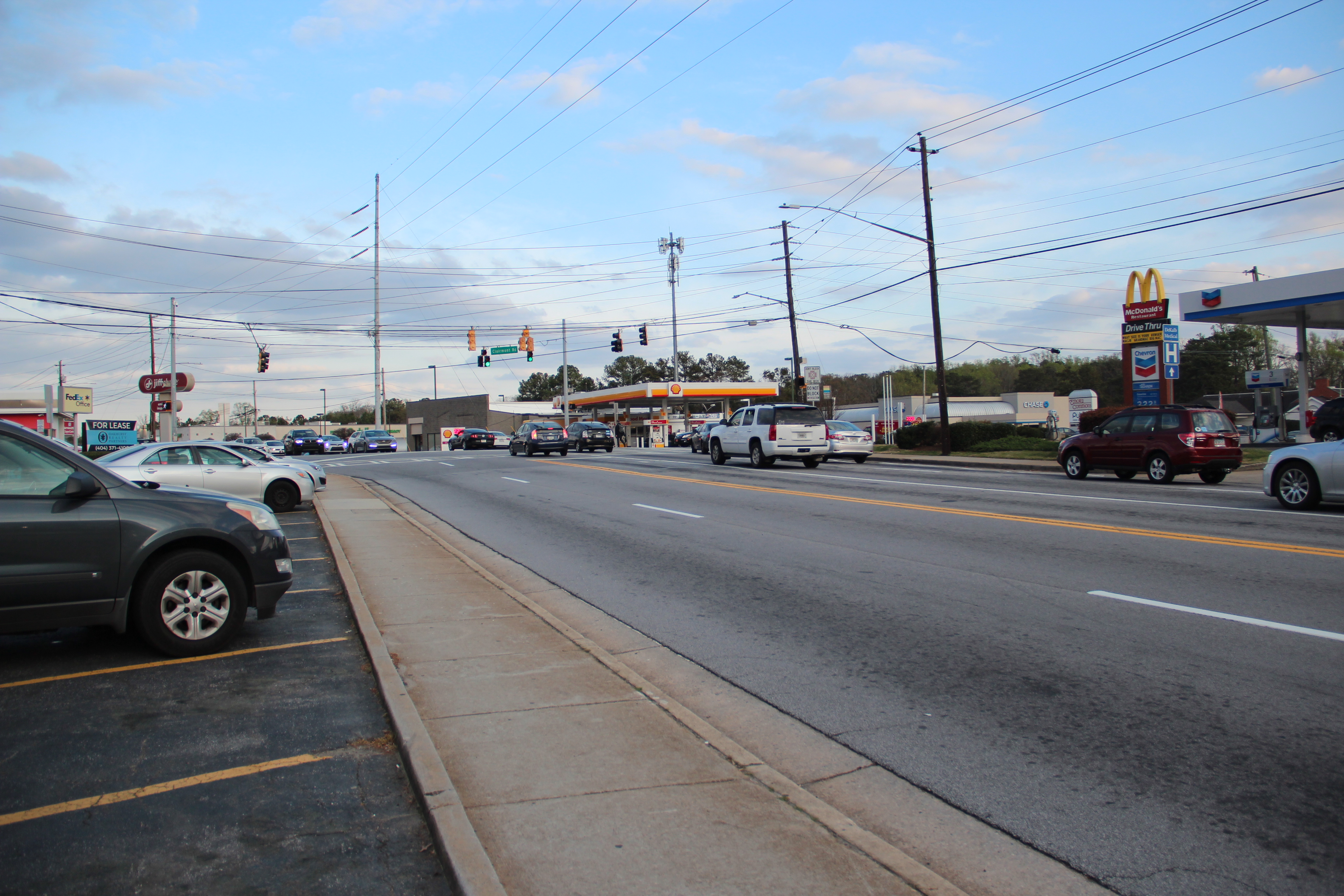
- North Decatur Road

- Location in DeKalb County and the state of Georgia

- location within central Metro Atlanta
- Coordinates: 33°48′11″N 84°17′24″W
- Country: United States
- State: Georgia
- County: DeKalb

Area
  - Total: 4.91 sq mi (12.72 km^{2})
  - Land: 4.91 sq mi (12.72 km^{2})
  - Water: 0 sq mi (0.00 km^{2})
- Elevation: 994 ft (303 m)

Population (2020)
  - Total: 18,511
  - Density: 3,769.1/sq mi (1,455.25/km^{2})
- Time zone: UTC-5 (Eastern (EST))
  - Summer (DST): UTC-4 (EDT)
- ZIP code: 30033
- Area code: 404 770
- FIPS code: 13-56112
- GNIS feature ID: 0332514

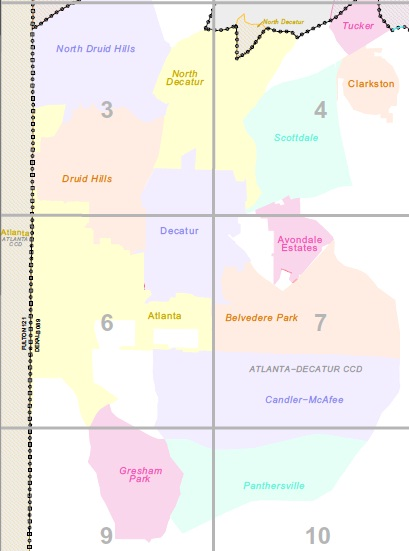
CDPs bordering eastern Atlanta

North Decatur is an unincorporated community and census-designated place (CDP) in DeKalb County, Georgia, United States. The population was 18,511 in 2020.

== History ==
An early settler in this part of DeKalb County was Chapman Powell, whose "Medicine House" cabin was built near 1218 Clairmont Road. (It has been preserved and relocated to Stone Mountain Park.) Dr. Powell (1798–1870) owned most of the land in the Candler Lake and South Fork Peachtree Creek area during his lifetime. His land was later purchased by Walter Candler.

Ezekiel Mason built a mill on the east side of Clairmont Road on Burnt Fork Creek. DeKalb County's Mason Mill Park, as well as local eatery Mason Tavern, are named after Ezekiel Mason.

== Geography ==
North Decatur is located at 33°48′11″N 84°17′24″W (33.803054, -84.290123).

According to the United States Census Bureau, the CDP has a total area of 5.0 square miles (12.9 km^{2}), all land. The North Decatur CDP's boundaries are:

- South: the city of Decatur
- West: CSX railroad and Clairmont Road, across which are the North Druid Hills and Druid Hills CDPs
- North: LaVista Road and Pangborn Road, across which are neighborhoods mostly inside the Tucker CCD
- East: Lawrenceville Highway and DeKalb Industrial Way, across which is mostly the Scottdale CDP

There is no true center to North Decatur; there are three commercial clusters at corners of the CDP:

- The student-oriented commercial district at Clairmont Road and North Decatur Road at the southwest corner of the CDP
- the Toco Hills retail cluster at North Druid Hills Road and Lavista Road at the northwest corner, and
- North DeKalb Mall and adjacent shopping centers along Lawrenceville Highway at the northeast corner of the district

Toco Hills, a de facto commercial center for several CDPs north of the city of Decatur, has grown from a country store in 1950, with a single gas pump and a pot-bellied stove, to multiple shopping centers, coffee houses, houses of worship and townhouses.

North Decatur primarily consists of 1950s and 1960s-era ranch homes, although condominiums are increasingly being developed in this community. Its proximity to Atlanta's Midtown and Buckhead districts, as well as Emory University and Decatur, makes it a desirable "in-town" location for what was originally developed as a suburban community.

== Neighborhoods ==
- Clairmont Heights. Located roughly between North Decatur Rd, Clairmont Rd, Mason Mill Park, and Willivee Dr.
- Country Squire Court. Located off of Pangborn Rd., SE of the railroad tracks.
- Druid Lake. New upscale neighborhood off North Druid Hills Rd., surrounded by North Druid Valley.
- Leafmore-Creek Park Hills. Neighborhood located between North Druid Hills Rd., Clairmont Rd., LaVista Rd. & the railroad tracks
- Medlock Park. The neighborhood located north of North Decatur Rd., east of Scott Blvd. and west of Clairmont Rd., around the DeKalb County park of the same name.
- North Druid Valley. Small neighborhood centered on Homewood Court, south of North Druid Hills Rd.
- North Druid Woods. Large neighborhood NW of the intersection of North Druid Hills Rds. & Lawrenceville Hwy.
- Ridgeland Park. Located between North Decatur Rd. and Decatur's city limits.
- Springdale Heights. Located off of Sycamore Heights in the Decatur Heights community.
- Tuxworth Springs. A condo complex off of Scott Blvd.
- University Heights. Neighborhood located north of North Decatur Rd. around Willivee.
- Valley Brook Estates. Neighborhood between Lawrenceville Highway & Stone Mountain Freeway, near East Ponce de Leon, & off McLendon.
- Winston Place. A condo complex off of LaVista.

== Demographics ==
Historical population
Census	Pop.	Note	%±
1980	11,830		—
1990	12,830		8.5%
2000	15,270		19.0%
2010	16,698		9.4%
2020	18,511		10.9%
U.S. Decennial Census; 1850-1870 1870-1880; 1890-1910 1920-1930; 1940 1950 1960; 1970 1980 1990; 2000 2010 2020

North Decatur was first listed as a census designated place in the 1980 U.S. census.

=== Racial and ethnic composition ===
North Decatur, Georgia – racial and ethnic composition Note: the US Census treats Hispanic/Latino as an ethnic category. This table excludes Latinos from the racial categories and assigns them to a separate category. Hispanics/Latinos may be of any race.
Race / ethnicity (NH = Non-Hispanic)	Pop 2000	Pop 2010	Pop 2020	% 2000	% 2010	% 2020
White alone (NH)	12,499	11,375	11,615	81.85%	70.28%	62.75%
Black or African American alone (NH)	1,212	1,999	2,383	7.94%	11.97%	12.87%
Native American or Alaska Native alone (NH)	37	34	24	0.24%	0.20%	0.13%
Asian alone (NH)	875	1,845	2,437	5.73%	11.05%	13.17%
Pacific Islander alone (NH)	9	4	4	0.06%	0.02%	0.02%
Other race alone (NH)	17	52	135	0.11%	0.31%	0.73%
Mixed race or Multiracial (NH)	192	366	838	1.26%	2.19%	4.53%
Hispanic or Latino (any race)	429	663	1,075	2.81%	3.97%	5.81%
Total	15,270	16,698	18,511	100.00%	100.00%	100.00%

=== 2020 census ===
As of the 2020 census, North Decatur had a population of 18,511. The median age was 38.6 years. 16.4% of residents were under the age of 18 and 18.6% of residents were 65 years of age or older. For every 100 females there were 83.5 males, and for every 100 females age 18 and over there were 80.3 males age 18 and over.

There were 9,106 households in North Decatur, including 3,518 family households; 20.5% had children under the age of 18 living in them. Of all households, 36.8% were married-couple households, 20.5% were households with a male householder and no spouse or partner present, and 36.4% were households with a female householder and no spouse or partner present. About 42.0% of all households were made up of individuals and 16.1% had someone living alone who was 65 years of age or older.

There were 9,879 housing units, of which 7.8% were vacant. The homeowner vacancy rate was 1.6% and the rental vacancy rate was 8.0%.

100.0% of residents lived in urban areas, while 0.0% lived in rural areas.

== Education ==
DeKalb County Schools serves the CDP. Some residents are zoned to Laurel Ridge Elementary School, while other residents are zoned to Fernbank Elementary School; both are in the North Decatur CDP. Residents zoned to Laurel Ridge and Fernbank are also zoned to Druid Hills Middle School (in the North Decatur CDP) and Druid Hills High School (in the Druid Hills CDP).

== Parks ==
- Clyde Shepherd Nature Preserve, 2580 Pine Bluff Dr. A nature preserve between Medlock Park, University Heights and the Medlock neighborhood.
- Mason Mill Park, 1340 McConnell Dr. 111-acre (0.45 km^{2}) DeKalb County park with tennis courts, recreation center, picnic area and trails. Also view the ruins of the 1906 Decatur Waterworks, used by the City of Decatur as a drinking water source until the 1940s.
- Medlock Park, 874 Gaylemont Cir. 39 acres (160,000 m^{2}) Dekalb County park with baseball & softball fields, multi-use field, multi-use court, playground, swimming pool and picnic area.

== Transportation ==
- LaVista Road. Northern boundary of North Decatur CDP.
- Lawrenceville Highway. Primary access from Interstate 285, and the eastern boundary of the North Decatur CDP.
- North Decatur Rd. Primary E-W road providing access from Emory University.
- North Druid Hills Rd. Primary NW-SE road that provides access from Interstate 85 and Stone Mountain Freeway, respectively.

== Churches ==
- Clairmont Hills Baptist Church -- Replanted as Bridgepoint Church at Toco Hills (Great Commission Baptist), 1995 Clairmont Rd.
- North Decatur United Methodist Church (UMC), 1523 Church St.
- North Decatur Presbyterian Church (PCUSA), 611 Medlock Rd.
- St. Paul Baptist Church, 1396 Nelms Dr.
