= Margaret Harris Comprehensive School =

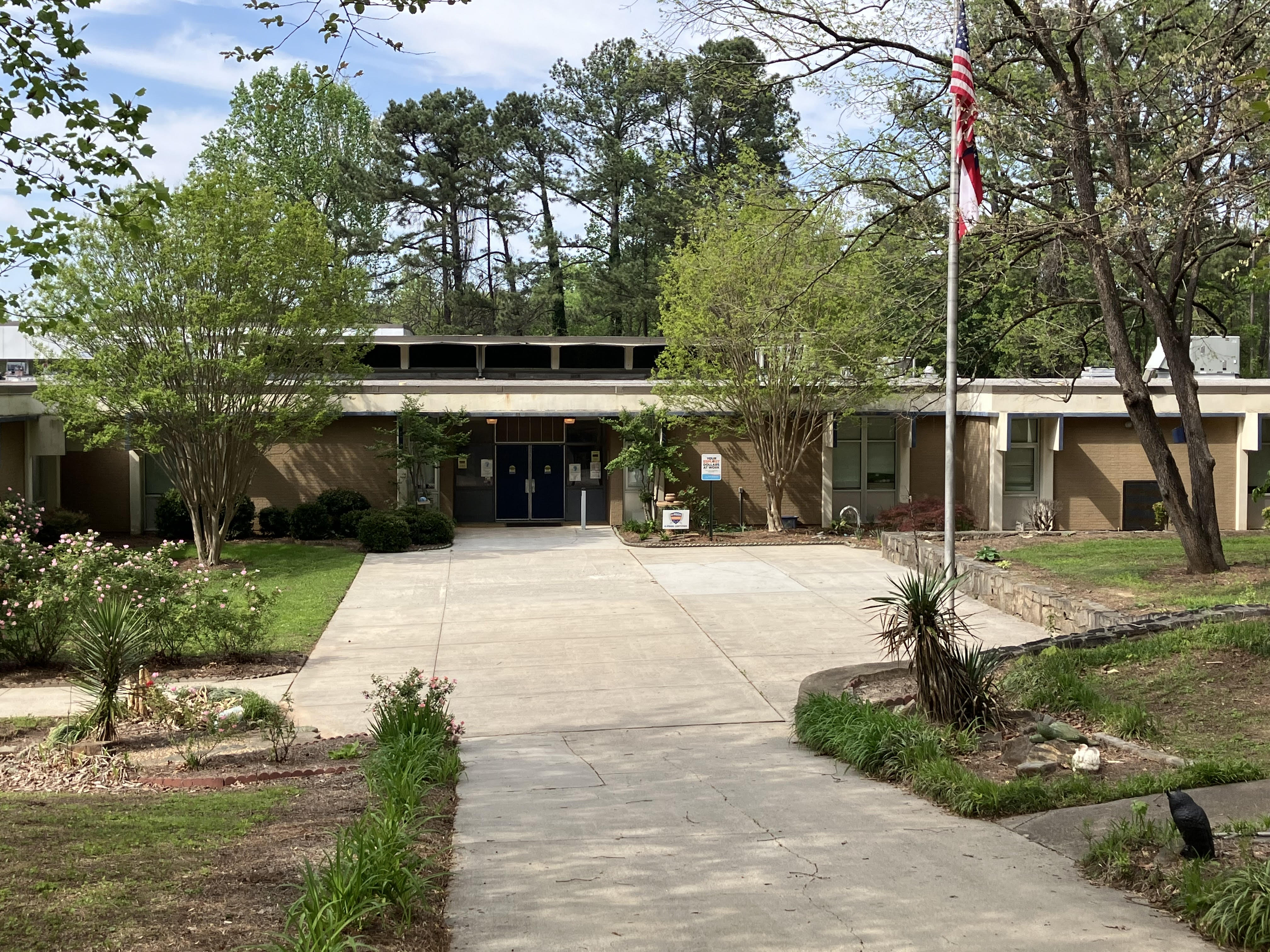
- Front of the school (April 2025)

Location
- North Druid Hills, DeKalb County, Georgia; United States
- Coordinates: 33.829323°N 84.320843°W

Information
- Former name: Margaret Harris High School for Exceptional Children
- Type: Special education school
- School district: DeKalb County School District
- Grades: PreK–12

Margaret Harris Comprehensive School (MHCS) is a special education school for grades PreK-12 in North Druid Hills in unincorporated DeKalb County, Georgia, United States. It is a part of the DeKalb County School District.

It was previously called Margaret Harris High School for Exceptional Children, and was a non-academic ungraded special education program center for disabled students of 14 to 21 years of age.
