= Asa G. Candler Jr. =

American businessman

Asa Griggs "Buddie" Candler Jr.
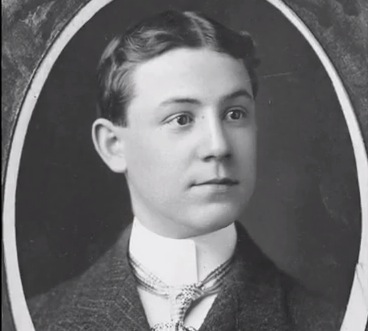
- Asa G. Candler Jr.
- Born: August 27, 1880
- Died: January 11, 1953 (aged 72); Atlanta, Georgia, U.S.
- Occupation: Businessman
- Spouses: Helen Magill (m. 1901; died 1927) Florence Adeline Stephenson (m. 1927)
- Children: 7
- Father: Asa Griggs Candler
- Relatives: Charles Howard Candler Sr. (sibling)

Asa Griggs "Buddie" Candler Jr. (August 27, 1880 – January 11, 1953) was an American businessman and the son of Asa Griggs Candler, founder of The Coca-Cola Company. Candler Jr. helped build his father's business into an empire. He later became a real-estate developer, opening the Briarcliff Hotel at the corner of Ponce de Leon Avenue and N. Highland Ave in the Virginia–Highland neighborhood of Atlanta.

== Life and career ==
=== Education and career ===
Asa Jr. attended Emory College at its original campus in Oxford, Georgia and was a classmate of the future vice president Alben W. Barkley. After graduation he helped set up bottling plants for Coca-Cola across North America. He also supervised construction of various office buildings in Atlanta and of Candler Airport, now known as the Hartsfield-Jackson Atlanta International Airport. Additionally, for more than 20 years, Candler was involved in running Westview Cemetery in Atlanta, where he built Westview Abbey, one of the largest community mausoleums in the world.

=== Briarcliff Farm ===
In 1910, Candler moved from the fashionable Inman Park neighborhood where his father also had a mansion, to a "ramshackle" farmhouse on Briarcliff Farm, 42 acres (17 ha) on Williams Mill Road in what is now the Druid Hills neighborhood near Atlanta. Williams Mill Road was renamed Briarcliff Road in the 1920s after the estate that Candler built there. The farm was just north of Callanwolde, his brother Charles Howard Candler's estate. Candler Jr. managed a huge agricultural operation which provided meat and produce to local retailers. Cows, sheep, pigs, and chickens were raised on the farm. During World War I, Briarcliff Farm supplied milk to Fort Gordon.

The farm was lauded for its use of electric lights and fans, even individual drinking fountains for the cows, its cleanliness, and its air and light, resulting in sanitary conditions that led to higher yields and quality.

=== Briarcliff estate and mansion ===
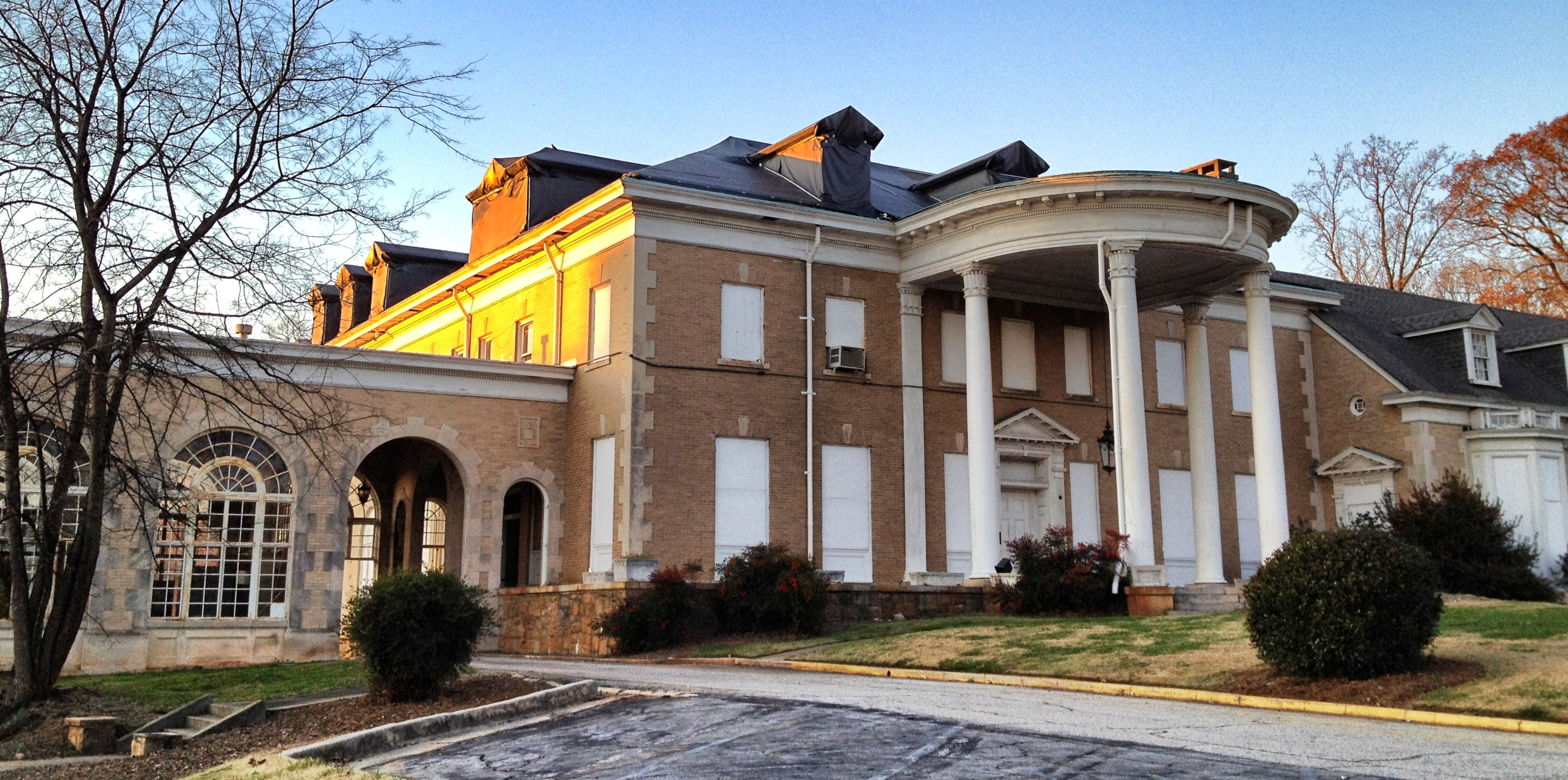
Asa G. Candler Jr. Mansion, 2012

In 1916 he began plans to turn the farm into an estate with a mansion, Briarcliff. Briarcliff was built between 1920 and 1922, and featured a Georgian Revival exterior. Architect Dan Bodin assisted Frazier in overseeing the completion. In 1925 Candler had the mansion enlarged, including the 1,700 square feet (160 m^{2}) music room, now DeOvies Hall, with its vaulted Tudor interior, limestone fireplace and painted walls.

His father and older brother had Aeolian organs, and to outdo them, in 1925 Candler had a $94,000, 88-rank, 187-stop, cathedral-sized Aeolian installed in the music room. It was the largest privately owned organ in Georgia at the time, and the 8th largest that Aeolian had ever built for a private residence. It was inaugurated in November 1925 in a recital by family friend Palmer Christian, which was broadcast over radio station WSB. In 1952 the organ was given to Wesleyan College in Macon, Georgia. It was renovated in 2008 and is now known as the Goodwyn-Candler-Panoz organ.

The mansion also included a golf course, two swimming pools (one open to the public for 25 cents per person), and a private zoo.

=== Sale of the estate ===
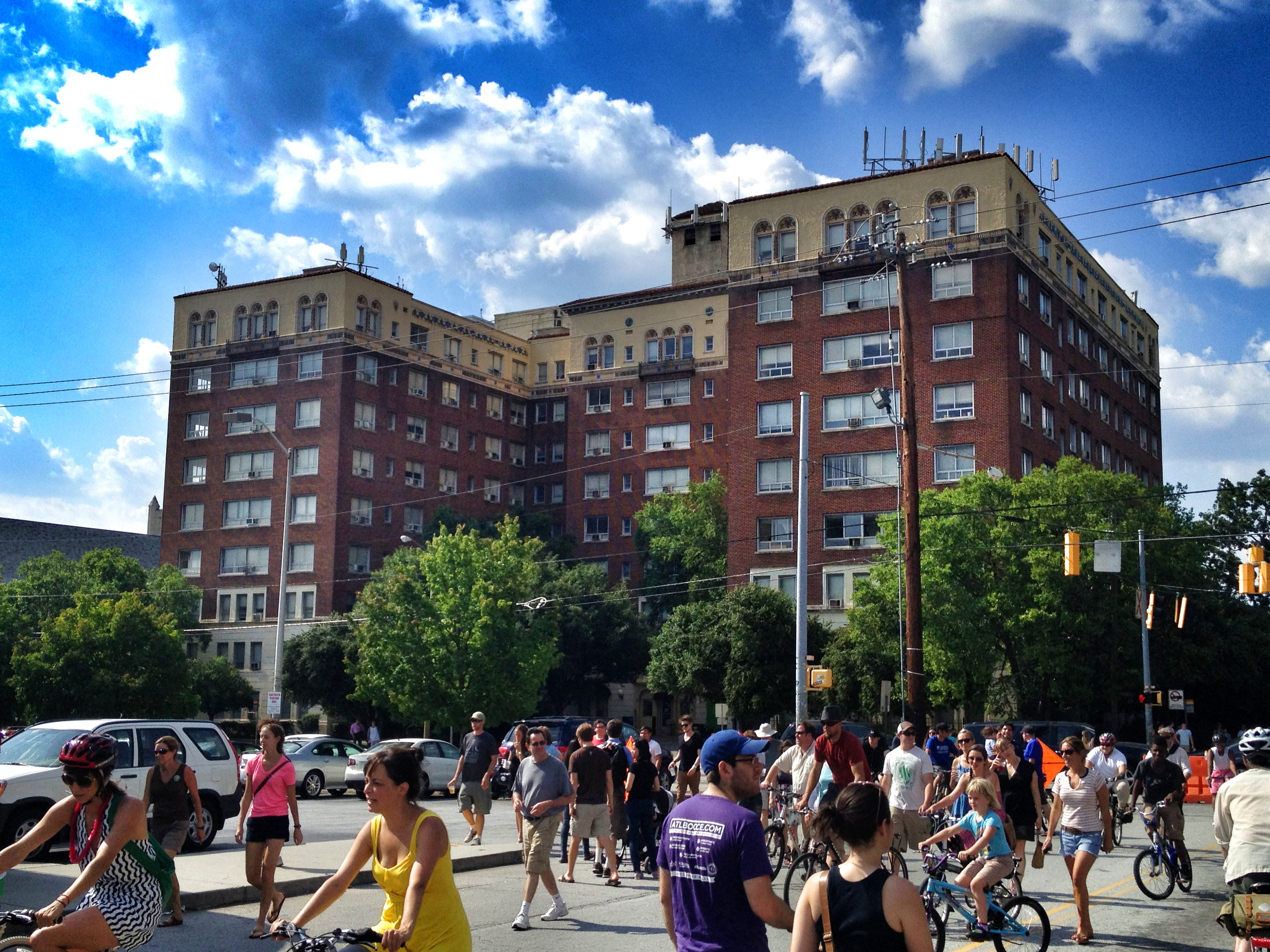
Briarcliff Hotel at Ponce de Leon and N. Highland avenues, in the penthouse of which Candler lived out his later years

The Candlers sold their estate to the General Services Administration in 1948. The planned veterans' hospital never emerged, and the estate was used to house the Georgian Clinic (later the DeKalb County Addiction Center), the first alcohol treatment facility in Georgia - poignant as Asa Jr. was an alcoholic himself. Later the complex housed the Georgia Mental Health Institute. The complex is now the Briarcliff campus of Emory University.

Candler lived out his later life in the penthouse of the Briarcliff Hotel, and was buried in Westview Cemetery.

== Personal life ==
Candler was a big game hunter and aviation enthusiast. He participated in many local and national air races.

Another hobby was magic and sleight of hand tricks which he learned on his travels to China and India. A 1930 report described how his mansion had a room full of equipment for magic shows, and that every spring he would hold a "high-jinks" magic show and party for friends.

Candler collected exotic birds and animals in a menagerie at his estate with cages designed by architect Bodin. He may have bought the animals while traveling in Europe from a down-and-out circus owner. The collection included a Bengal tiger, four lions, a black leopard, a gorilla, baboons, and six elephants: Coca, Cola, Pause, Refreshes, Refreshing, and Delicious. In 1935 Candler was in financial trouble. He put up his pipe organ for sale, but ended up not needing to sell it.

Candler's neighbor sued him and won a $10,000 settlement because "a baboon jumped over the wall of the zoo and devoured $60 in currency out of her purse". He gave away his entire menagerie of animals to the Atlanta City zoo at Grant Park (now Zoo Atlanta).

=== Marriages ===
Candler's first marriage was in 1901 to Helen Magill, daughter of the late Colonel John H. Magill, former editor of the Hartwell, Georgia, Sun and Laura Eberhardt Magill. Helen was "a leading figure in local social and civic circles" in Atlanta both before and during her marriage active in the United Daughters of the Confederacy, the Fine Arts Club, the Atlanta Woman's Club, and the Atlanta Garden Club. Helen was frequently lauded in the local press for her elegant "toilets", a term used at the time for dresses or gowns. Helen died in January 1927, aged 40. Asa Jr.'s uncle, a Methodist Bishop Warren Akin Candler, officiated at her funeral, and she was buried, as her husband later was, in Westview Cemetery.

In October 1927 Bishop Warren Candler married Asa Jr. to his second wife Florence Adeline Stephenson of Lithonia, Georgia, who for nine years had been his secretary.

=== Children ===
Asa and Helen's children included three sons, Asa G. III, who died at 7 months of age, John H. (1905–1947), who moved to Baltimore, and Samuel, who remained in Atlanta. They had four daughters: Laura, Helen, Martha, and Lucy.

=== Religion ===
Asa was a member of the Atlanta First United Methodist Church at 360 Peachtree Street. A 1951 interview states that his alcoholism, depression, and other troubles were mitigated by a "surrender to God".
