= University Park–Emory Highlands–Emory Estates Historic District =

Historic district in Georgia, United States

- U.S. National Register of Historic Places
- U.S. Historic district
- Location within Atlanta Location within Georgia Location within the United States
- Nearest city: Decatur, Georgia
- Coordinates: 33°47′24″N 84°18′57″W
- Area: 85 acres (34 ha)
- Built: 1916
- Architect: O.F. Kauffman, J.T. Nash
- Architectural style: Late 19th And Early 20th Century American Movements, Late 19th And 20th Century Revivals
- NRHP reference No.: 97001638
- Added to NRHP: August 31, 1998

University Park–Emory Highlands–Emory Estates is a historic district listed on the National Register of Historic Places in the Druid Hills CDP adjacent to Emory University near Atlanta, Georgia.

The University Park tract broke ground in 1916 and consists of 65 houses along Emory and Ridgewood Drives.

Emory Highlands was laid out in 1923 and consists of 58 lots along Burlington Road and Ridgewood Drive between University and North Decatur Road.

Emory Estates was laid out in 1925 and consists of 73 lots on Emory Circle and Durand Drive. Houses here date from 1925 through 1943.

== Architecture ==
Small, Craftsman-style bungalows and English Vernacular-style cottages are most common. There are also some larger, two-story Colonial Revival-style houses.
