= Druid Hills, Georgia =

Neighborhood of Atlanta, Georgia, United States

Druid Hills
- CDP and neighborhood of Atlanta
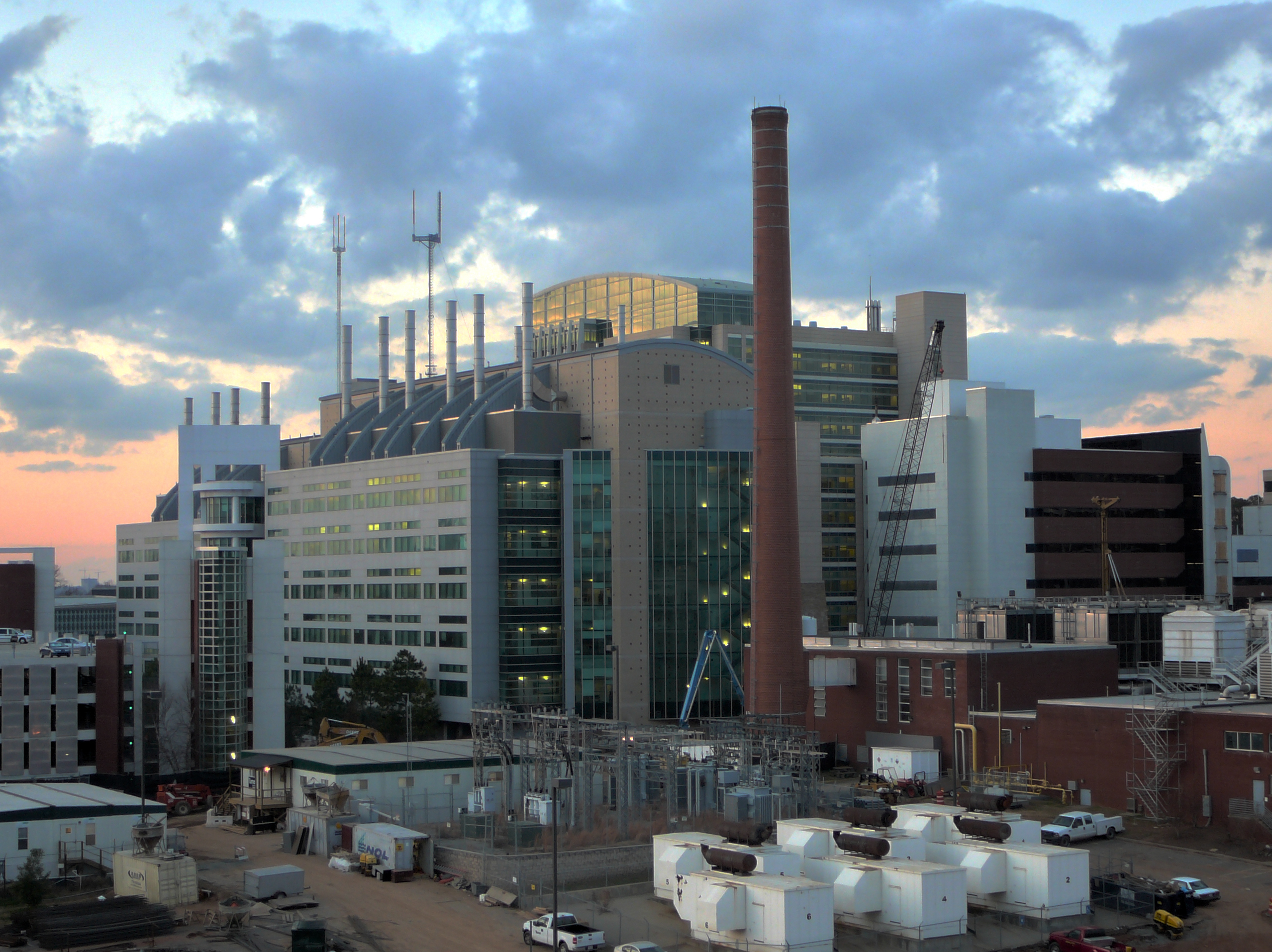
- Centers for Disease Control and Prevention headquarters

- Location in DeKalb County and the state of Georgia
- Druid Hills CDP, unincorporated DeKalb County
- Coordinates: 33°47′14″N 84°19′34″W
- Country: United States
- State: Georgia
- County: DeKalb

Area
  - Total: 2.98 sq mi (7.72 km^{2})
  - Land: 2.97 sq mi (7.70 km^{2})
  - Water: 0.0039 sq mi (0.01 km^{2})
- Elevation: 912 ft (278 m)

Population (2020)
  - Total: 9,429
  - Density: 3,170.4/sq mi (1,224.08/km^{2})
- (CDP only)
- Time zone: UTC-5 (Eastern (EST))
  - Summer (DST): UTC-4 (EDT)
- ZIP code: 30333
- Area code: 404
- FIPS code: 13-24264
- GNIS feature ID: 0331589

Druid Hills is a community which includes both a census-designated place (CDP) in unincorporated DeKalb County, Georgia, United States, as well as a neighborhood of the city of Atlanta. As of the 2020 census, Druid Hills had a population of 9,429. The CDP formerly contained the main campus of Emory University and the Centers for Disease Control and Prevention (CDC); however, they were annexed by Atlanta in 2018. The Atlanta-city section of Druid Hills is one of Atlanta's most affluent neighborhoods with a mean household income in excess of $238,500 (making it the ninth most affluent, per that metric).

== History ==
The planned community was initially conceived by Joel Hurt, and developed with the effort of Atlanta's leading families, including Coca-Cola founder Asa Candler. It contains some of Atlanta's historic mansions from the late 19th and early 20th century. Druid Hills includes the main campus of Emory University, which relocated to Atlanta in 1914.

Druid Hills was designed by Frederick Law Olmsted and was one of his last commissions. A showpiece of the design was the string of parks along Ponce de Leon Avenue, which was designated as Druid Hills Parks and Parkways and listed on the National Register of Historic Places on April 11, 1975. The remainder of the development was listed on the Register as the Druid Hills Historic District on October 25, 1979. Later the Park and Parkways district was consolidated into the Druid Hills Historic District. The other historic districts in Druid Hills are:

- Emory University District, added in 1975
- University Park-Emory Highlands-Emory Estates Historic District, added in 1998
- Emory Grove Historic District, added in 2000.

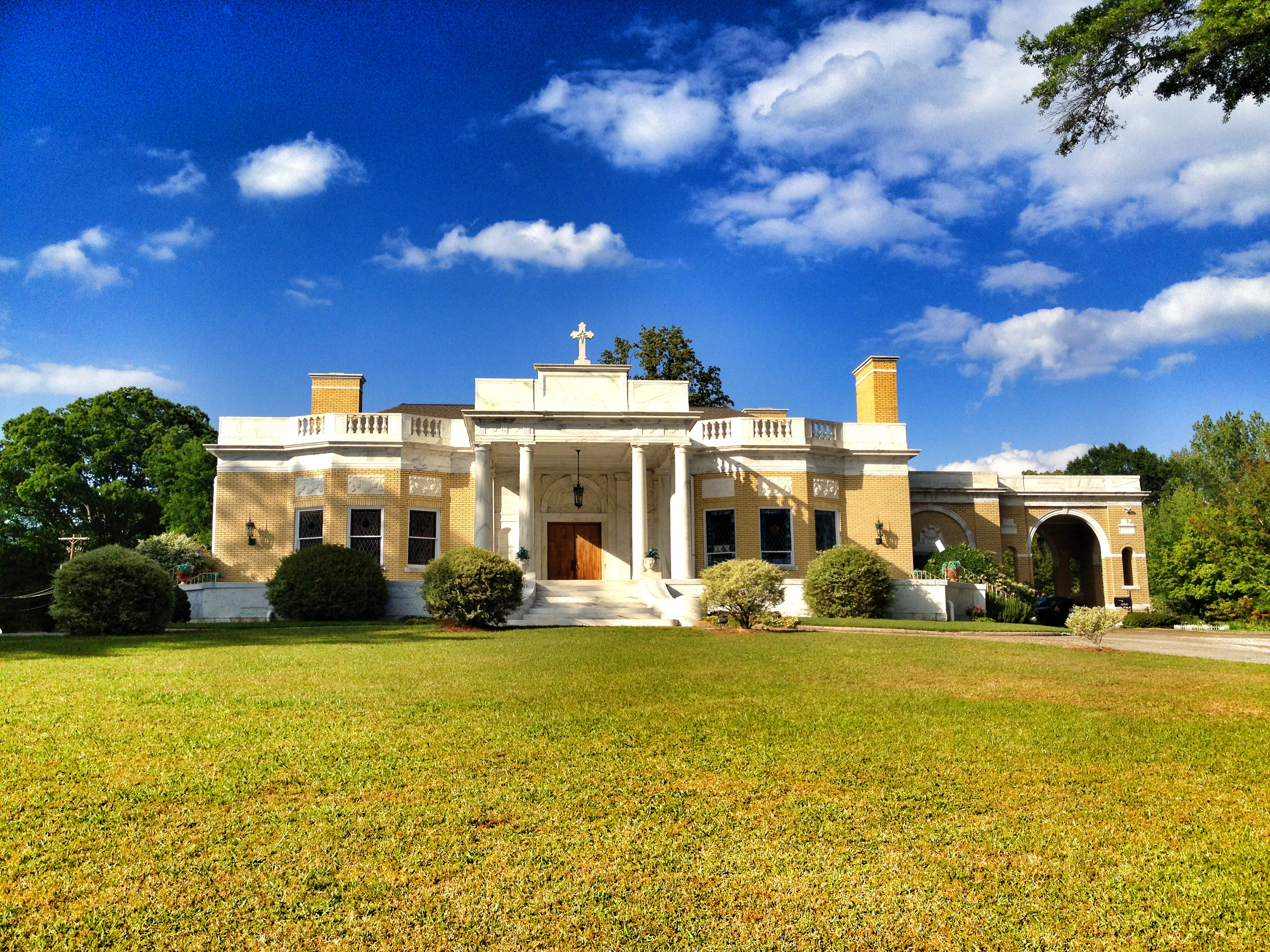
St. John's Chrysostom Melkite Church along in Druid Hills, Atlanta, 2012, formerly the mansion of Asa Griggs Candler (Senior)

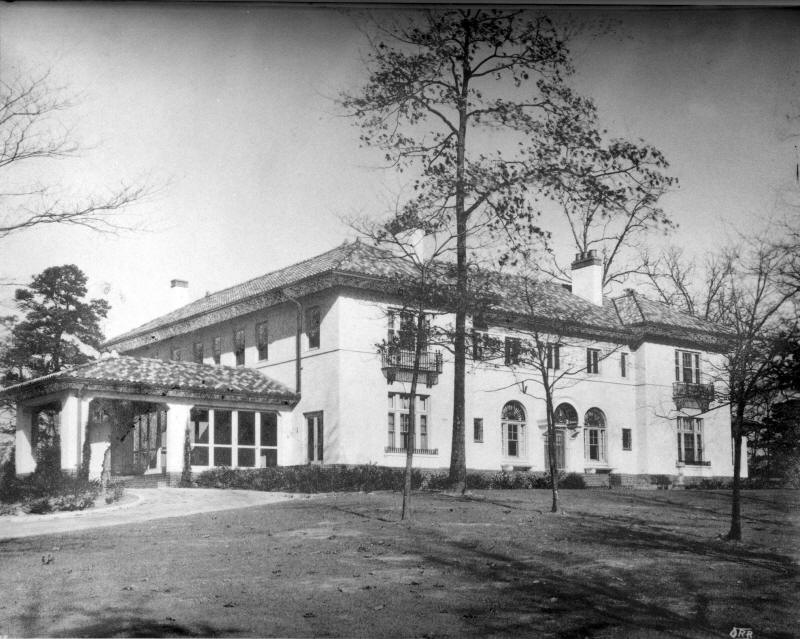
Rainbow Terrace, home of Lucy Beall Candler Owens Heinz Leide at 1610 Ponce de Leon Ave., 1922

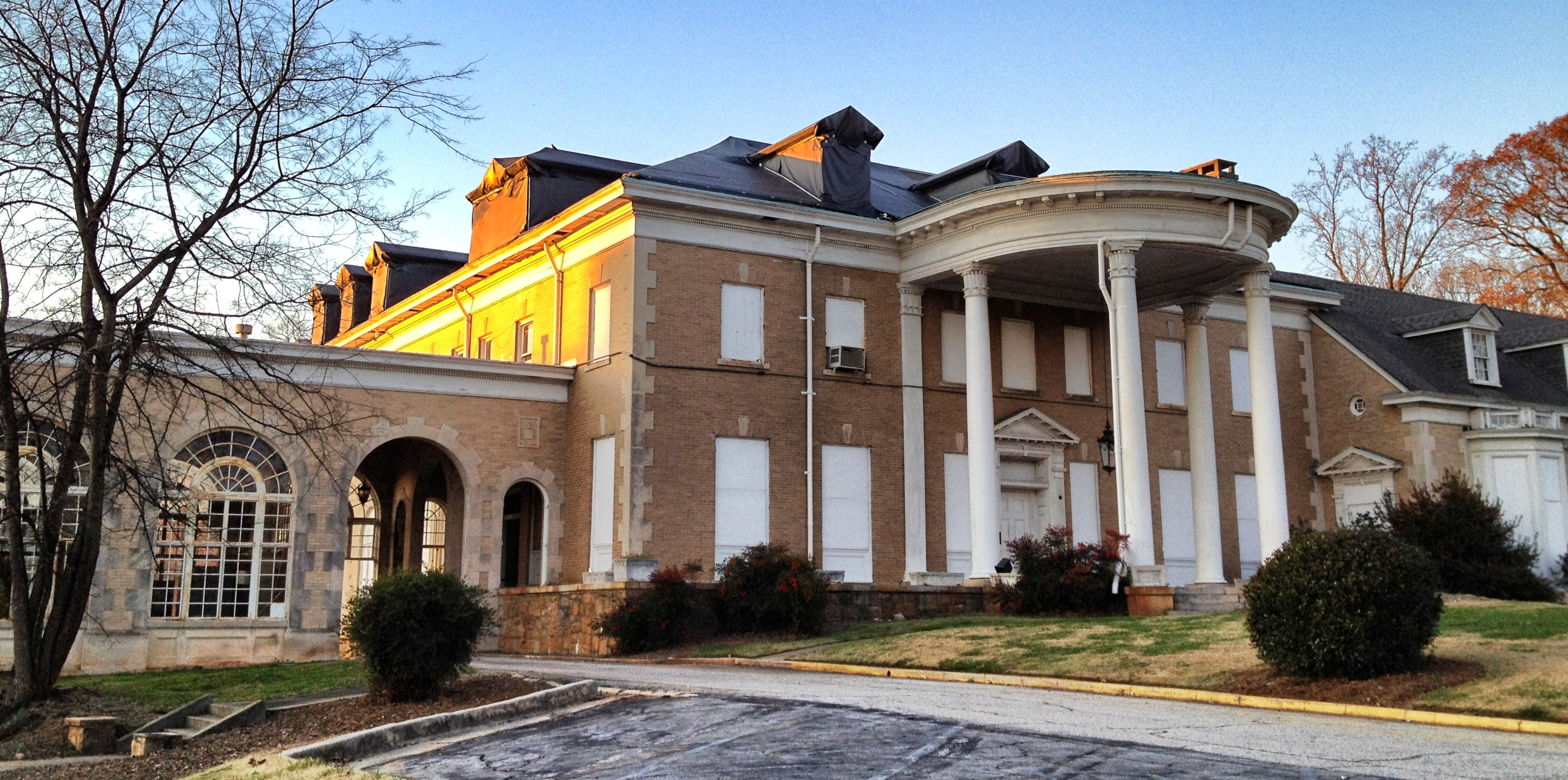
Briarcliff, the Asa G. Candler, Jr. Mansion, 2012

By 2015 there was a bill in the Georgia Legislature which called for annexing more of Druid Hills into Atlanta.

In 2016 Emory University's administration stated that it intended to petition the university to be annexed into the City of Atlanta, along with the CDC area; in 2017 the university leadership formally submitted its petition. The City of Atlanta annexed Emory's campus effective January 1, 2018, a part of its largest annexation within a period of 65 years; the Atlanta City Council voted to do so the prior December.

== Geography ==
Druid Hills is located at 33°47′14″N 84°19′34″W (33.787205, -84.325974).

According to the United States Census Bureau, the CDP has a total area of 4.2 square miles (11 km^{2}), of which 0.04 square miles (0.10 km^{2}), or 0.48%, is water. The CDP's northern boundary is the South Fork of Peachtree Creek; the CSX track and the Decatur city limits are the eastern boundary; the DeKalb County line is the western boundary; and the southern boundary is the Atlanta city limit.

The Druid Hills neighborhood of Atlanta is bounded by the Druid Hills CDP (i.e. unincorporated DeKalb County) on the north and east; the Morningside/Lenox Park, Virginia-Highland and Poncey-Highland neighborhoods of Atlanta on the west; and the Candler Park neighborhood of Atlanta on the south.

The Chelsea Heights neighborhood is located in the eastern part of the CDP at the Decatur border, and participates in the Druid Hills Civic Association.

== Demographics ==
Historical population
| Census | Pop. | Note | %± |
|---|---|---|---|
| 1980 | 12,700 | | — |
| 1990 | 12,174 | | −4.1% |
| 2000 | 12,741 | | 4.7% |
| 2010 | 14,568 | | 14.3% |
| 2020 | 9,429 | | −35.3% |
U.S. Decennial Census; 1850-1870 1870-1880; 1890-1910 1920-1930; 1940 1950 1960; 1970 1980 1990; 2000 2010 2020

Druid Hills was first listed as a census designated place in the 1980 U.S. census.

=== Racial and ethnic composition ===
Druid Hills, Georgia – Racial and ethnic composition Note: the US Census treats Hispanic/Latino as an ethnic category. This table excludes Latinos from the racial categories and assigns them to a separate category. Hispanics/Latinos may be of any race.
| Race / Ethnicity (NH = Non-Hispanic) | Pop 2000 | Pop 2010 | Pop 2020 | % 2000 | % 2010 | % 2020 |
|---|---|---|---|---|---|---|
| White alone (NH) | 10,511 | 11,103 | 7,112 | 82.50% | 76.21% | 75.43% |
| Black or African American alone (NH) | 748 | 1,097 | 554 | 5.87% | 7.53% | 5.88% |
| Native American or Alaska Native alone (NH) | 16 | 19 | 9 | 0.13% | 0.13% | 0.10% |
| Asian alone (NH) | 929 | 1,594 | 773 | 7.29% | 10.94% | 8.20% |
| Pacific Islander alone (NH) | 9 | 6 | 3 | 0.07% | 0.04% | 0.03% |
| Some Other Race alone (NH) | 24 | 33 | 50 | 0.19% | 0.23% | 0.53% |
| Mixed Race or Multi-Racial (NH) | 195 | 297 | 425 | 1.53% | 2.04% | 4.51% |
| Hispanic or Latino (any race) | 309 | 419 | 503 | 2.43% | 2.88% | 5.33% |
| Total | 12,741 | 14,568 | 9,429 | 100.00% | 100.00% | 100.00% |

=== 2020 census ===
As of the 2020 census, Druid Hills had a population of 9,429. There were 4,260 households and 1,977 families residing in the CDP. The median age was 36.6 years. 15.7% of residents were under the age of 18 and 16.3% of residents were 65 years of age or older. For every 100 females there were 90.3 males, and for every 100 females age 18 and over there were 88.8 males age 18 and over.

100.0% of residents lived in urban areas, while 0.0% lived in rural areas.

Of the 4,260 households, 20.5% had children under the age of 18 living in them. Of all households, 43.4% were married-couple households, 19.4% were households with a male householder and no spouse or partner present, and 30.3% were households with a female householder and no spouse or partner present. About 32.5% of all households were made up of individuals and 8.2% had someone living alone who was 65 years of age or older.

There were 4,548 housing units, of which 6.3% were vacant. The homeowner vacancy rate was 1.6% and the rental vacancy rate was 6.7%.

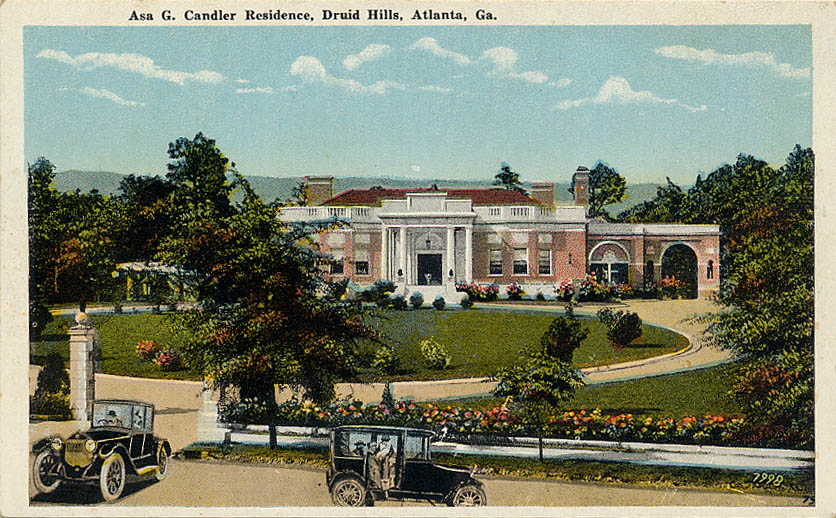
Candler mansion (built 1916) at 1500 Ponce de Leon Avenue in Druid Hills

== Economy ==
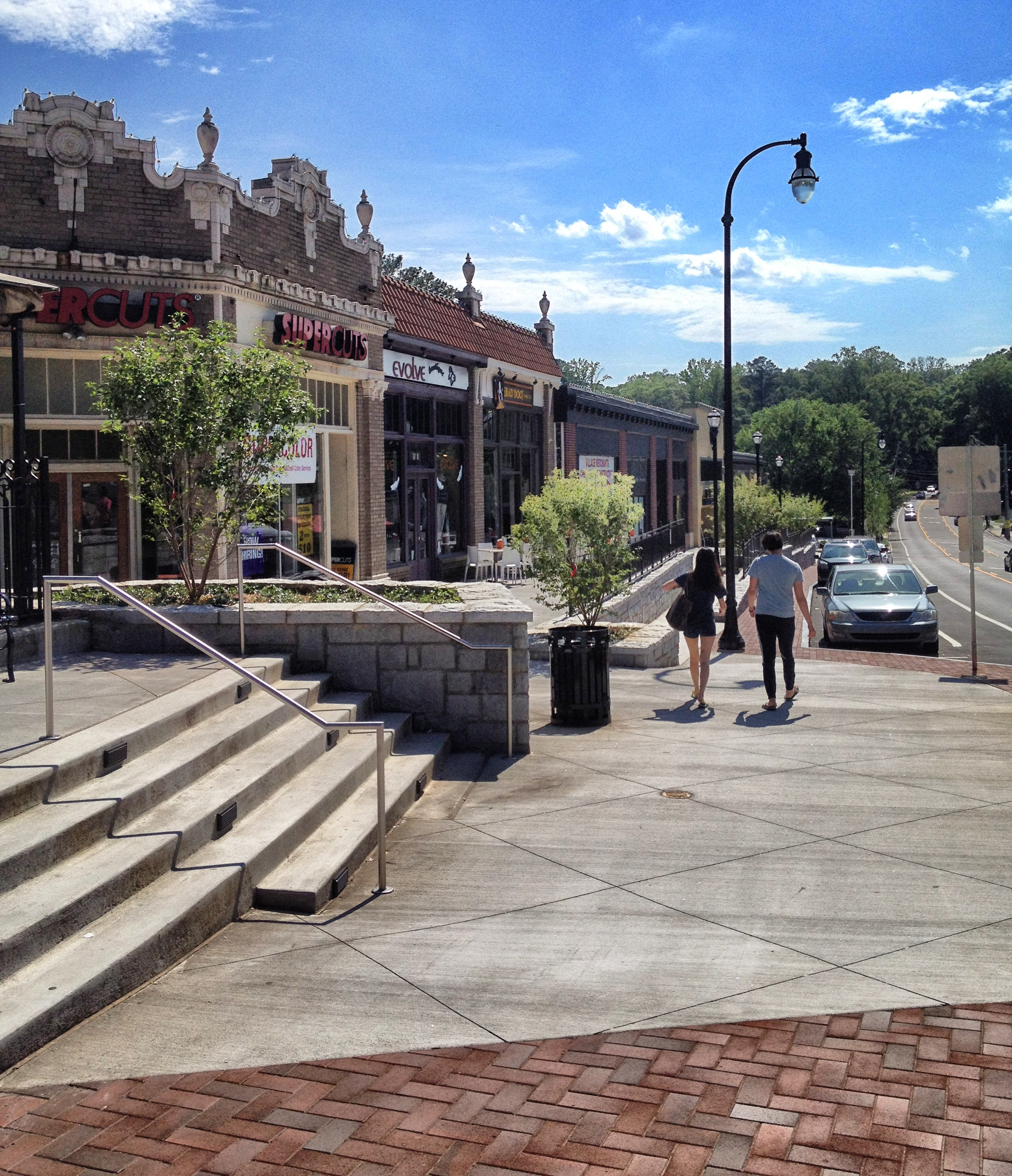
Emory Village, a small historic commercial node

Emory University, including its hospitals, is the third largest employer in Metro Atlanta as of 2007/8. The CDC is also an employer of note.

Commercial areas include Emory Village, a small node first developed in the 1920s at the terminus of the streetcar line to Emory. A revitalization of the area was completed in 2011 with new sidewalks, street furniture and two new roundabouts.

The other, larger commercial areas fall just outside the community's boundaries, such as the Clairmont Road corridor in North Decatur, the Sage Hill shopping center in Atlanta's Morningside/Lenox Park, and the Ponce de Leon Avenue corridor just west of Druid Hills in Atlanta's Poncey-Highland/Virginia-Highland.

== Arts and culture ==
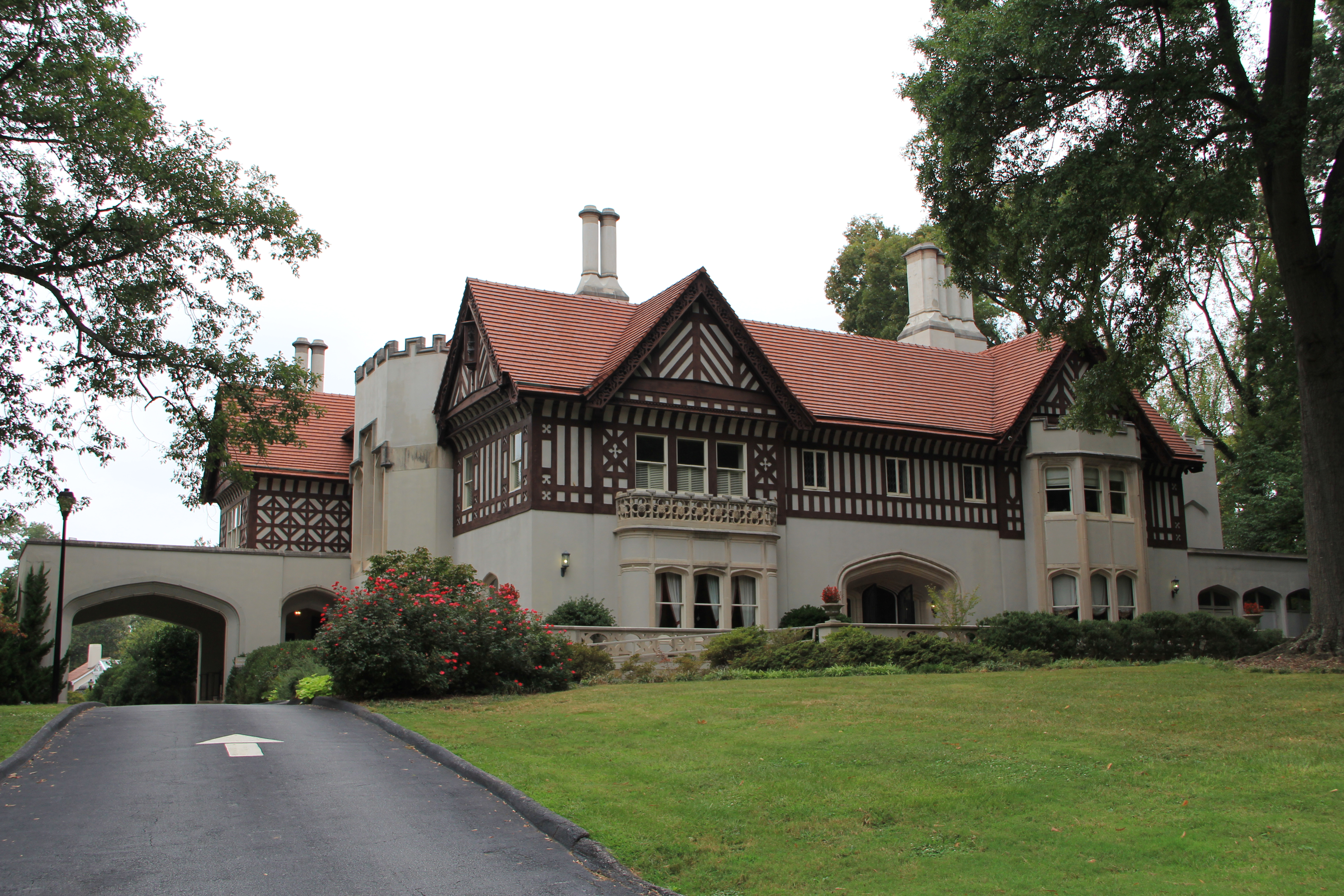
Callanwolde Fine Arts Center (Charles Howard Candler mansion)

Druid Hills is home to The Atlanta Boy Choir on S. Ponce de Leon Ave. and Callanwolde Fine Arts Center, housed in the Gothic-Tudor style former estate of Charles Howard Candler, president of Coca-Cola and eldest son of Asa Griggs Candler, Coca-Cola's co-founder.

== Parks ==
- Baker Woodland, Emory University, between Fishburne Dr. & South Kilga Cir. Forest of oak, tulip poplar, beech, and hickory trees - contains over 100 plant species.
- Burbanck Park, Oxford Rd. & Clifton Rd. 1.2-acre (4,900 m^{2}) natural park which borders Peavine Creek. It is named after Madeline and William Burbanck, Emory University professors who owned the property.
- Fernbank Forest, Fernbank Museum of Natural History.
- Fernbank School Park, 157 Heaton Park Dr. This DeKalb County 12-acre (49,000 m^{2}) park is located west of the CSX railroad tracks. It includes a multi-use field and court, playground, picnic area and walking trails.
- Hahn Woods, Emory University, Houston Mill Rd. (at South Peachtree Creek). Nature preserve with trail and viewing platform over the creek.
- Olmsted Linear Park, Druid Hills, Ponce de Leon Ave. 50 acres (200,000 m^{2}) of six distinct parks, strung along Ponce de Leon Avenue like a necklace. They were designed by Frederick Law Olmsted in the late 19th century. Each of the six parks has its own name: Deepdene, Dellwood, Shadyside, Springdale, Virgilee and Oak Grove (formerly Brightwood).
- Wesley Woods Forest, Emory University.
- Princeton Way Park, a small neighborhood park that is surrounded by the interior homes of Princeton Way. The park is equipped with picnic tables, swings, slides, a sandbox, short walking trails, and an informal baseball setup.

== Government ==
The neighborhood organization, the Druid Hills Civic Association (DHCA), gives input to two authorities since the community is divided between the city of Atlanta and unincorporated territory in DeKalb County.

The Atlanta part is an official recognized neighborhood of Atlanta, which in turn is part of NPU N. Officially, DHCA exercises its input into planning and other city processes by giving input to the NPU.

DeKalb County does not have an officially designated role for the community within the county government in the way the City of Atlanta does (though there are five large geographic districts for the election of county commissioners), so the DHCA gives input to the unitarian county government in Decatur.

The United States Postal Service operates the Druid Hills Post Office at 1799 Briarcliff Road NE in the North Druid Hills CDP in unincorporated DeKalb.

The Centers for Disease Control and Prevention's main offices were formerly located in the CDP. The City of Atlanta annexed the CDC effective January 1, 2018.

== Education ==
=== Primary and secondary schools ===
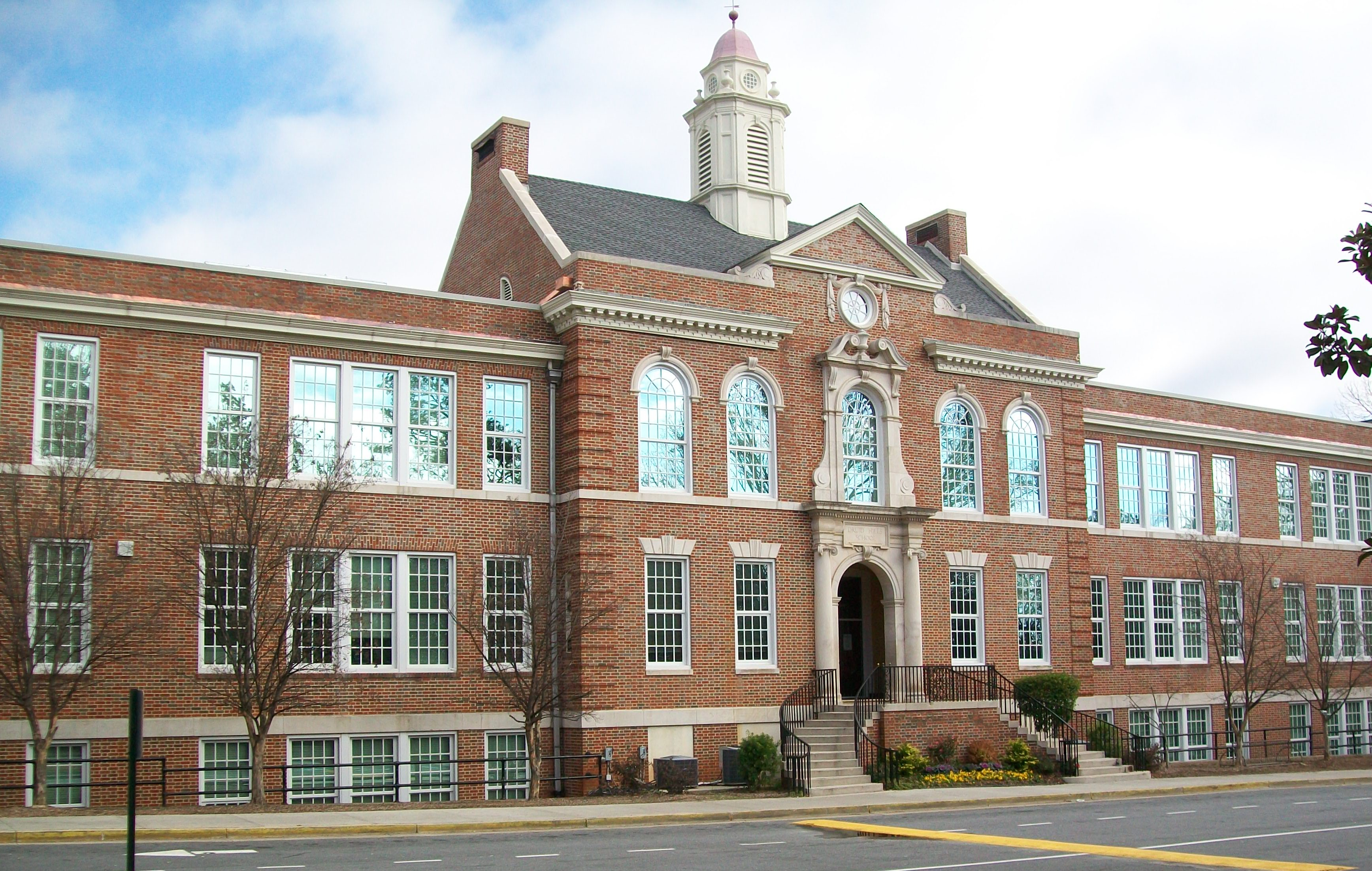
Druid Hills High School (DeKalb County School District)

The non-Atlanta portions of Druid Hills are in the DeKalb County School District. Most residents are zoned to Fernbank Elementary School (in the Druid Hills CDP) while some are zoned to Briar Vista Elementary School. All residents are zoned to Druid Hills Middle School (in the North Decatur CDP), and Druid Hills High School (in the Druid Hills CDP).

The Atlanta sections (the Emory/CDC annexation) are in Atlanta Public Schools. The zoned schools are Springdale Park Elementary School, D. T. Howard Middle School, and Midtown High School (formerly Henry W. Grady High School). The Emory/CDC annexation was scheduled to be moved into APS from DeKalb Schools in 2024.

The Paideia School is a nearby preK–12 private school in the city of Atlanta.

=== Colleges and universities ===
Emory University is a private university formerly located in the Druid Hills CDP. The City of Atlanta annexed Emory effective January 1, 2018.

== Infrastructure ==
=== Transportation ===
Public bus transportation is provided by the Metropolitan Atlanta Rapid Transit Authority, while Emory University runs an extensive fleet of shuttles, called the "Cliff".

=== Healthcare ===
Emory University Hospital and Children's Healthcare of Atlanta - Egleston Hospital are in the Druid Hills area.

The City of Atlanta annexed Egleston and Emory University effective January 1, 2018. Prior to the annexation, Egleston was in Druid Hills CDP, as was Emory Hospital.

== Notable people ==
- Cully Cobb, founder of the Cobb Institute of Archaeology at Mississippi State University

== See also ==
- Druid Hills Golf Club
- Emory Grove Historic District

== Bibliography ==
- Bryant, James C. Druid Hills Golf Club in Atlanta: The Story and the People, 1912–1997. Atlanta, Ga.: Druid Hills Golf Club, 1998
- Hartle, Robert, Jr. Atlanta's Druid Hills: A Brief History. The History Press, June 27, 2008.
