= Greek Orthodox Metropolis of Atlanta =

Metropolis of the Greek Orthodox Church

Greek Orthodox Metropolises
Metropolis of Atlanta

Personnel
Archbishop	Sevastianos (Skordallos)
Cathedral	Annunciation Greek Orthodox Cathedral (Atlanta)

Geography
Location	Georgia, Alabama, Florida, Mississippi, Tennessee, North Carolina, South Carolina, and Louisiana.

Vital Statistics
Total Parishes	73
- Website: atlmetropolis.org

The Greek Orthodox Metropolis of Atlanta is one of the Metropolises of the Greek Orthodox Archdiocese of America with 73 parishes.

== List of Bishops ==
=== Fifth District ===
- Bishop Germanos (Polizoydis) - 1942
- Bishop Aimilianos (Laloussis) - 1960 - 1973

=== Diocese of Atlanta ===
- Bishop Philip (Koutoufas) - 1992 - 1996

=== Metropolis of Atlanta ===
- Metropolitan Alexios (Panagiotopoulos) - 1999 - 2024
- Metropolitan Sevastianos (Skordallos) - 2024–Present
