= Druid Hills High School =

Public high school in Druid Hills, Georgia, United States

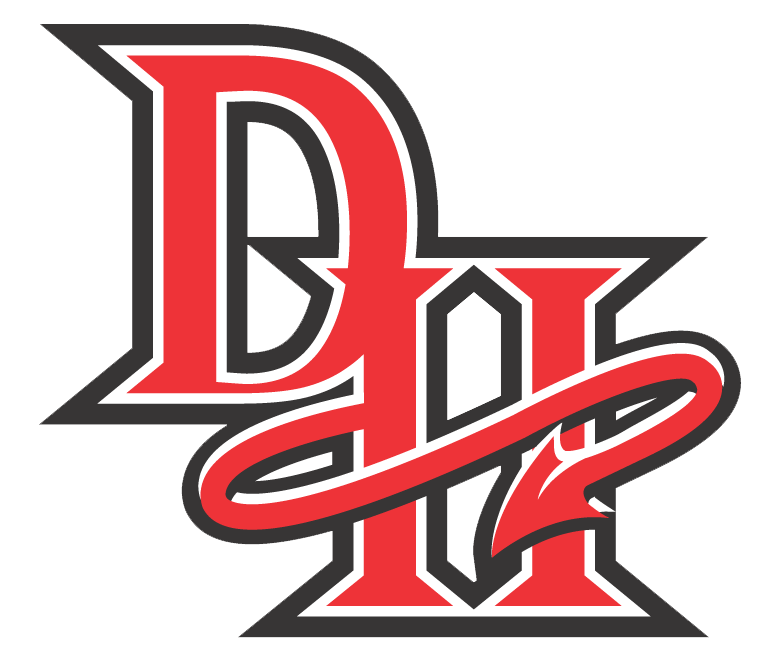

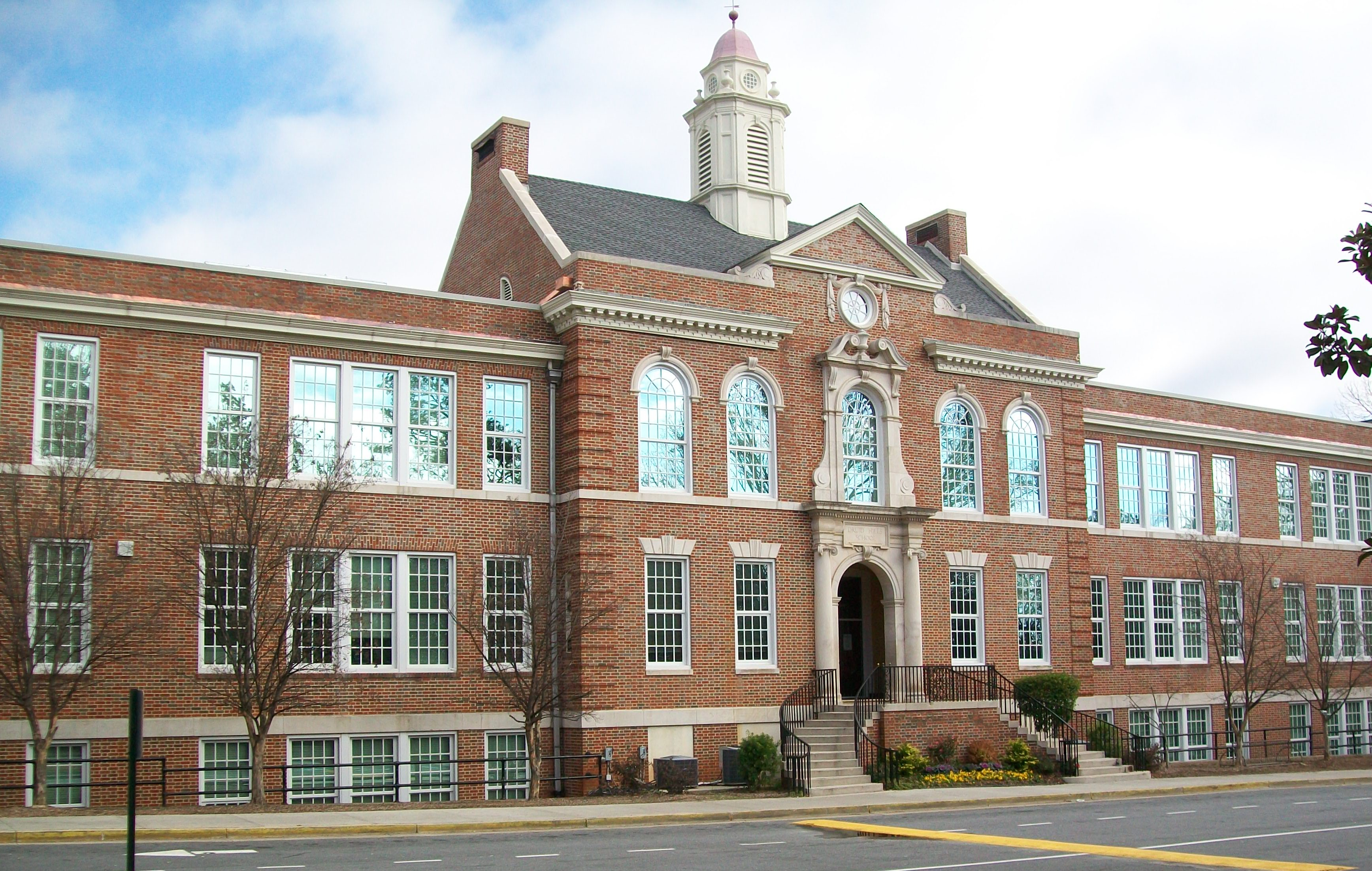
- The main building as viewed from the school's picnic area, December 2011

Location
- 1798 Haygood Drive; Druid Hills, (Dekalb County), Georgia 30307; United States; 33°47′37″N 84°18′58″W

Information
- Type: Public
- Motto: Quality Teaching, Quality Learning
- Established: 1919
- School number: 2055
- Principal: Michael Costa
- Teaching staff: 92.00 (FTE)
- Grades: 9–12
- Enrollment: 1,430 (2023-2024)
- Average class size: 250 to 400
- Student to teacher ratio: 15.54
- Campus: Suburban
- Colors: Red and black
- Athletics: Baseball, basketball, cheerleading, cross country, football, golf, lacrosse, marching band, rifle team, soccer, softball, swimming, tennis, track & field, ultimate, volleyball, and wrestling
- Mascot: Red Devils
- Newspaper: The Spotlight
- Yearbook: SAGA
- Website: druidhillshs.dekalb.k12.ga.us

Druid Hills High School is a high school operated by the DeKalb County School District. It is located at 1798 Haygood Drive, in the Druid Hills CDP in unincorporated DeKalb County, Georgia, United States. It serves the Druid Hills CDP and portions of the North Decatur and North Druid Hills CDPs.

== School characteristics ==
=== Academics ===
Several levels of academics are offered at Druid Hills. From least to greatest difficulty, the course types available are online/DOLA, general, accelerated/honors/gifted, Advanced Placement, and International Baccalaureate classes. Dual enrollment options are also offered. All classes are in accordance with Georgia Performance Standards and students must take state-administered End of Course Tests (EOCTs), unless otherwise exempt. Graduates often enroll as first-year undergraduate students at the University of Georgia, Georgia Institute of Technology, and Georgia State University.

Druid Hills has had IB accreditation since 2004 as an IB World School, however, AP classes generally are more populated than their IB counterparts. Roughly 10% of the student body enrolls in the IB Diploma Programme, often with less than 50 IB students per grade.

=== Enrollment ===
The zoning boundary includes:

- Druid Hills CDP
- North Decatur CDP (part)
- North Druid Hills CDP (part)

Enrollment for the 2009–2010 school year was 1,421 students in grades 9-12. A later population size indicated was 1,459.

Previously the attendance boundary included the Emory University/Centers for Disease Control area. The Emory/CDC area was annexed into the City of Atlanta effective January 1, 2018. The area was scheduled to join Atlanta Public Schools (APS) in 2024.

=== Accreditation ===
On December 17, 2012, the Southern Association of Colleges and Schools announced that it had downgraded the DeKalb County Schools System's status from "on advisement" to "on probation" and warned the school system that the loss of their accreditation was "imminent." Partially in an attempt to distance Druid Hills from the danger of disaccreditation and county mismanagement, parents and other contributors of Druid Hills High School began a petition to form a public charter cluster of five elementary schools, one middle school, and one high school. This included Druid Hills High School, Avondale Elementary, Briar Vista Elementary, Fernbank Elementary, Laurel Ridge Elementary, McLendon Elementary, and Druid Hills Middle School. The charter cluster would have granted some autonomy to the schools as a group while still remaining part of the DeKalb County School District. However, this charter was turned down by the Dekalb School Board on November 11, 2013, with a 5–4 vote against it, which was a final and non-appealable decision.

== School Lockdown Incident ==
At 10:30 AM on May 5, 2022, students at DHHS informed their principal that they believed a fellow classmate had brought a gun to school. The principal then informed the school resource officer, locking down the school while police searched for the student and the weapon. The lockdown was ended around noon when police decided that the student had likely escaped to the area around the school, the student was later apprehended on the Emory University campus just before 4 PM that day.

== School Conditions Scandal ==
In early 2022, a group of DHHS students and parents posted a video showing various health and safety issues. The DeKalb County School Board voted against modernizing the school, leading to student protests. On April 25 the state superintendent sent a letter ordering the school board to take action to repair the school. On May 31, 2022, the DeKalb County School Board voted 7-0 to restore Druid Hills High School at a proposed funding level of $50 million.

== Feeder schools ==
Druid Hills is fed into by the following Elementary Schools:

- Briar Vista Elementary School
- Fernbank Elementary School
- Laurel Ridge Elementary School
- McLendon Elementary School
- Avondale Elementary School

Druid Hills Middle School, formerly known as Shamrock Middle School, and The Museum School are Druid Hills' two feeder middle schools.

== Notable alumni ==
- Josh Arieh, World Series of Poker champion
- Gayle Barron, distance runner
- Ron Blomberg, Major League Baseball player
- Brenda Boozer, Opera singer
- Hermann Flaschka, mathematician
- Sam Massell, former mayor of Atlanta
- Shameik Moore, actor and musician
- Ray Stevens, recording artist
- Herman Talmadge, former Georgia Governor and Georgia Senator
- Alfred Uhry, playwright
