= Annunciation Greek Orthodox Cathedral (Atlanta) =

Coordinates: 33°49′44.41″N 84°18′33.97″W

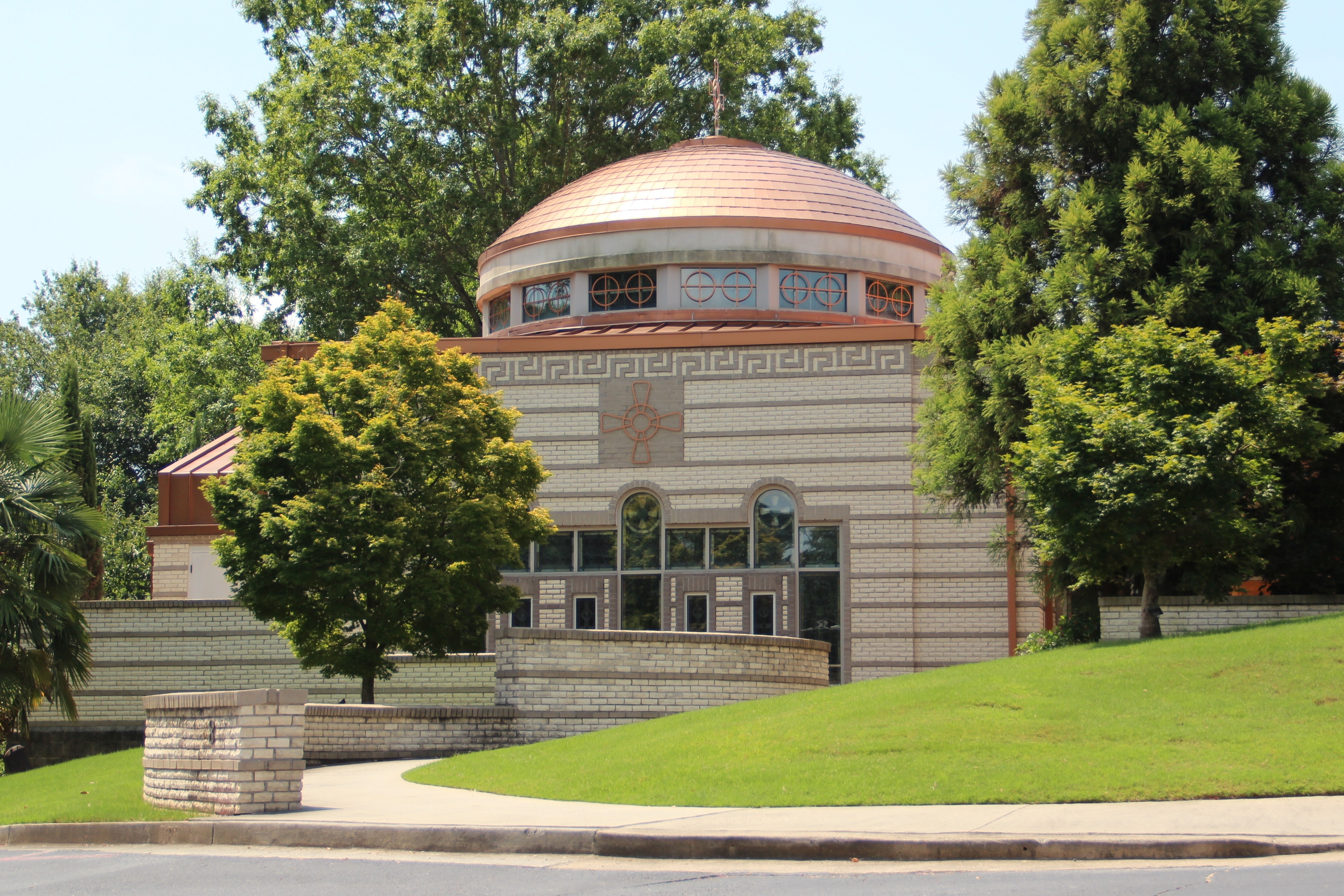
- The Annunciation Cathedral in 2019
- Annunciation Greek Orthodox Cathedral
- Location: 2500 Clairmont Rd NE, Atlanta, Georgia
- Denomination: Greek Orthodox
- Website: http://www.atlgoc.org/

Architecture
- Functional status: Active
- Architectural type: Cathedral
- Style: Byzantine
- Completed: 1967 (current building)

Clergy
- Archbishop: Sevastianos (Skordallos)
- Dean: Rev. Fr. Paul A. Kaplanis

The Annunciation Cathedral is a Greek Orthodox cathedral located in Atlanta, Georgia. It is the seat of the Archbishop of the Metropolis of Atlanta, in the Southeastern United States. The church is known for the rich background and extravagant decoration on both the interior and exterior of the church. The original membership of the parish was 72. The current membership includes over 1200 families.

== History ==
The Annunciation Greek Orthodox Cathedral was established in 1905. The first services were held on the second floor of a sporting goods store. Once the membership of the church started to grow, the church relocated a couple of times. Former locations include: A Presbyterian church (1906–1928) and a former Jewish temple (1928–1967). Since 1968, the cathedral has been located at 2500 Clairmont Road. The current building is a giant domed cathedral with a large community center adjacent to the church, which was dedicated in 2002.

== Architecture ==
The church was built in a typical Byzantine style. The shape of the church is round, with a giant domed roof. Inside the church, glittering mosaics decorate the walls. A noteworthy feature of the church is the mosaic on the dome. It shows Jesus Christ as the Pantocrator. There are also mosaics on the iconostasis. In addition to the mosaics, the church also has some stained glass windows above the iconostasis. The stained glass windows show Jesus Christ surrounded by the twelve disciples. Each disciple gets his own small circular window, with the window showing Jesus being directly above the altar. The window with Jesus is slightly bigger than the other windows.

== See also ==
- List of cathedrals in the United States
