= Briarcliff Hotel =

- U.S. National Register of Historic Places
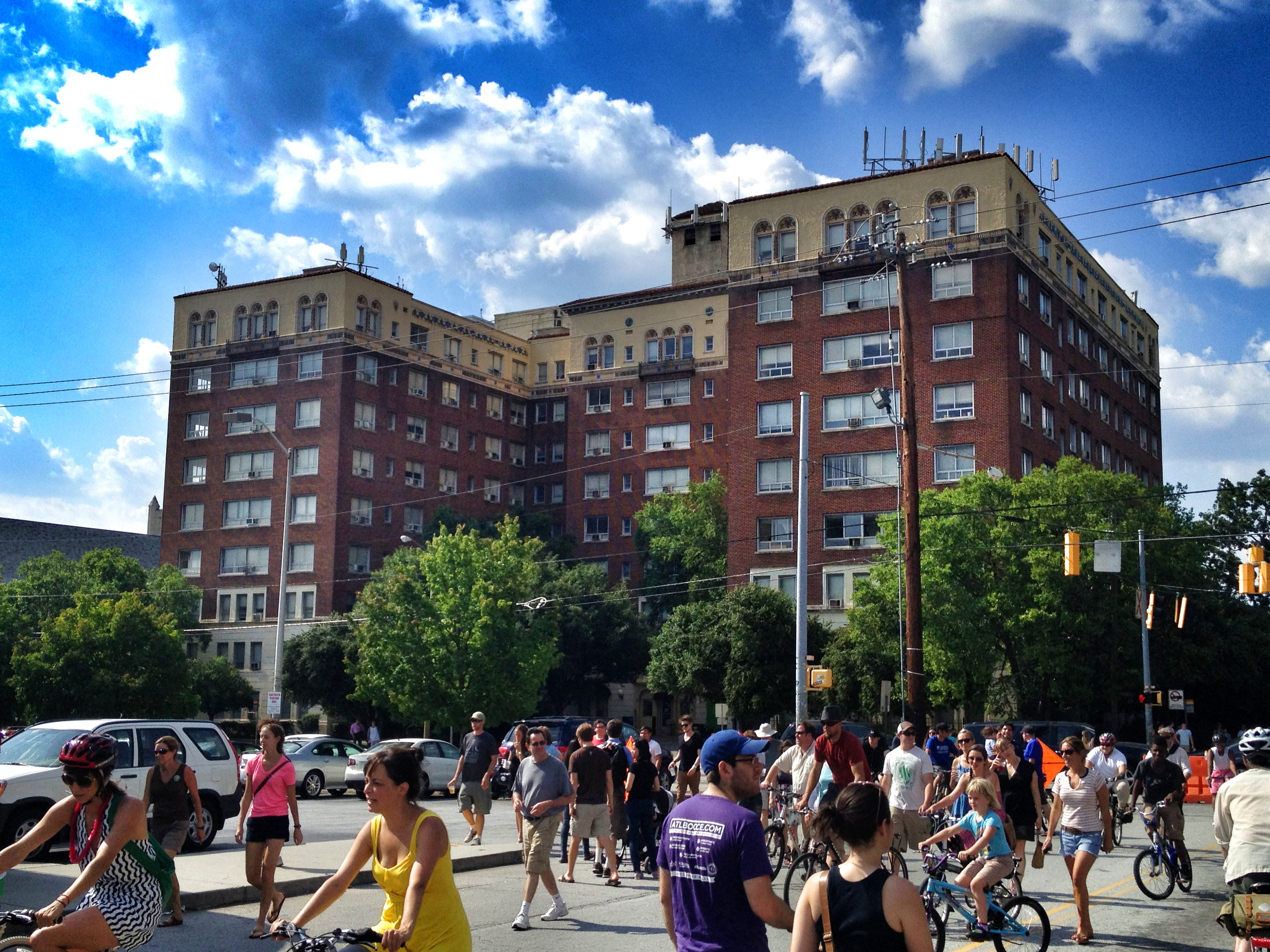
- Briarcliff Summit, May 2012

- Location within Atlanta Location within Georgia Location within the United States
- Location: 1050 Ponce de Leon Avenue, Atlanta, Georgia
- Coordinates: 33°46′26″N 84°21′11″W
- Area: 1.2 acres (0.49 ha)
- Built: 1924
- Architect: G. Lloyd Preacher
- NRHP reference No.: 82002415
- Added to NRHP: September 9, 1982

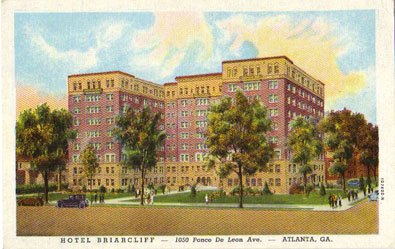
Briarcliff Hotel, postcard (early 20th century)

The Briarcliff Hotel, now the Briarcliff Summit, is located at 1050 Ponce de Leon Ave. NE (original address: 750 Ponce de Leon Ave.) in the Virginia Highland neighborhood of Atlanta, Georgia.

Asa G. Candler, Jr., the eccentric son of Coca-Cola magnate Asa Candler Sr., owned the real estate firm that built the Briarcliff in 1924. The Briarcliff is 9 stories tall in an "H" shape. It opened as "the 750", a luxury apartment building with 200 units. The architect was G. Lloyd Preacher, who also designed Atlanta's City Hall. After the 1929 stock market crash, it was converted to a commercial hotel, subdivided into 400 units in order to offer cheap rates. In the late 1940s, Candler reconverted the hotel into luxury apartments, taking the top floor and making it into a penthouse suite for himself and his second wife, Florence. His inlaws, Edgar Chambers, Sr and Kate Mumford Chambers, parents of his daughter Laura's husband and owners of Parks Chambers, an upscale men's clothing store in Atlanta, lived in a large apartment on the 1st floor in the building known as "1050 Briarcliff" or more simply as "1050". In the 1960s, after the death of prominent tenants, the building was deteriorating and was sold by Candler's heirs and again called the Briarcliff Hotel.

The hotel was uniquely tied to gospel music. Hovie Lister and his Statesmen Quartet had offices at the Briarcliff. Statesmen business manager Don Butler and tenor Roland "Rosie" Rozell partnered to open the King & Prince Restaurant inside the hotel.

The building is now known as the Briarcliff Summit Apartments, providing Section 8 housing for the elderly. Residents are now all elderly with federally subsidized rent.

In January 2012, a deal was reached whereby Evergreen Partners Housing will buy the property in May 2012 and renovate the building, which according to the Patch newspaper as of January 2012 was "falling apart", in the months thereafter.

== See also ==
- National Register of Historic Places listings in Fulton County, Georgia
- Hotels in Atlanta
