= Carnegie Building (Atlanta) =

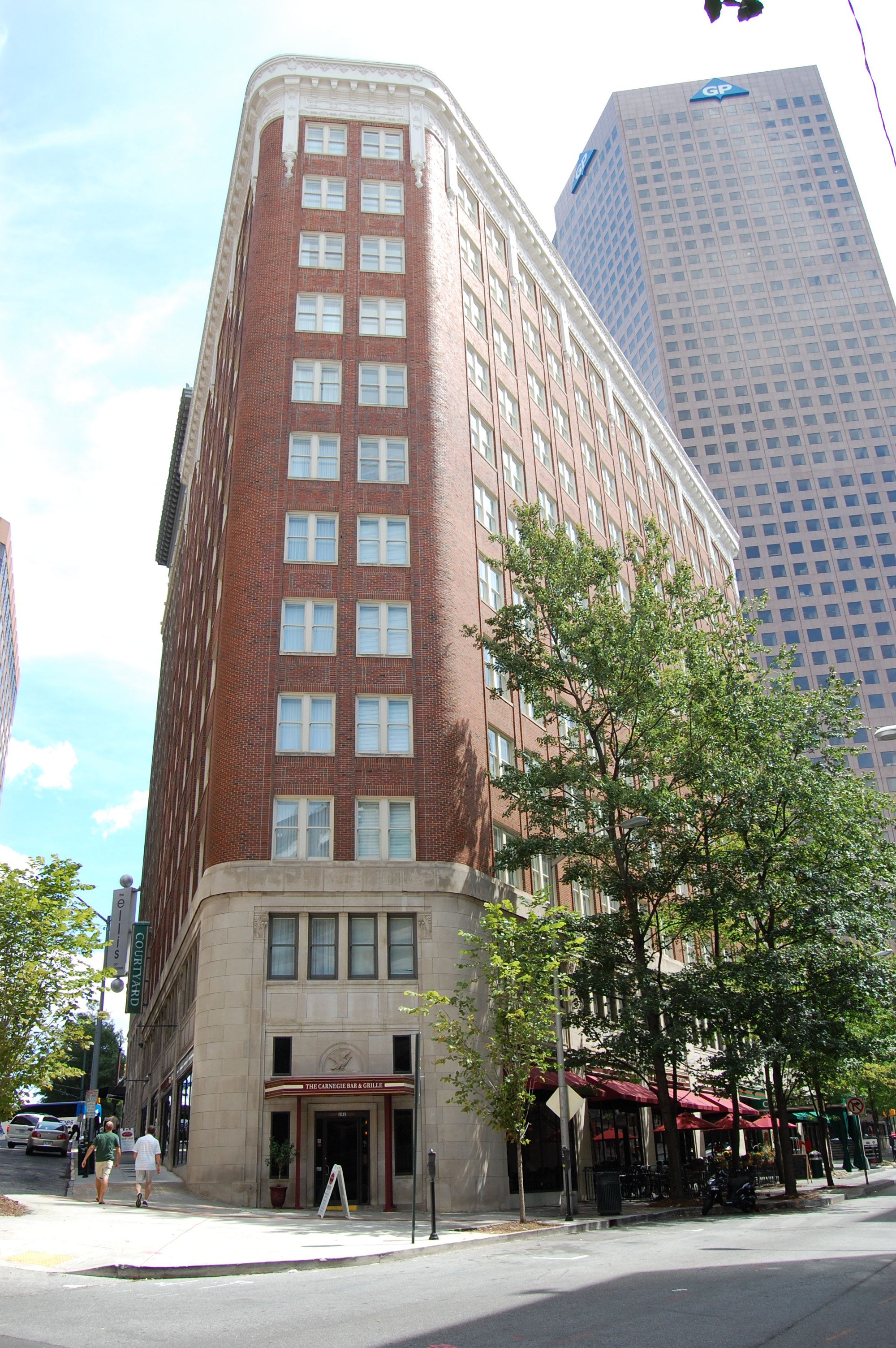
- Carnegie Building in 2012, with Georgia-Pacific Tower in the background

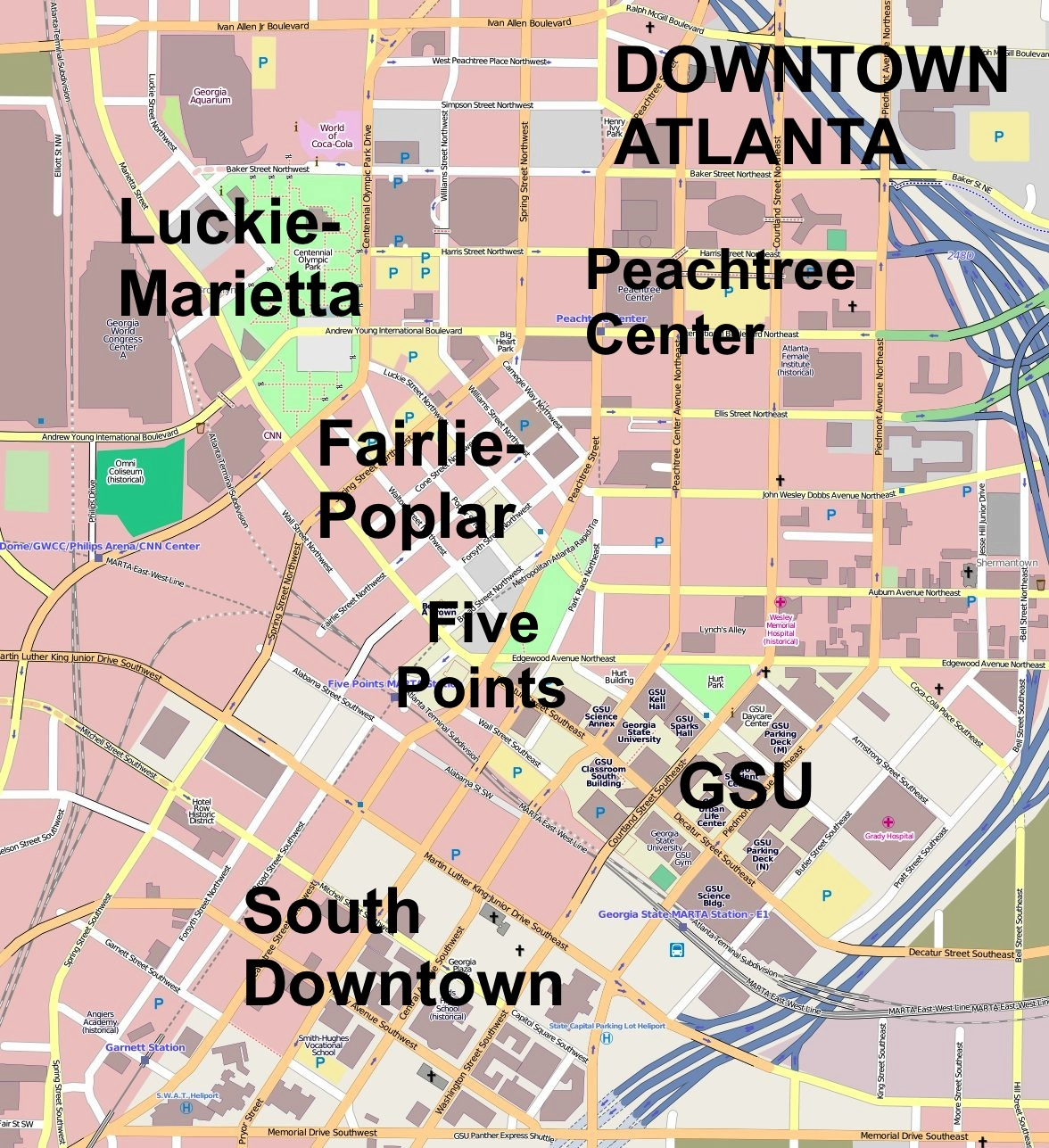
- Location within Downtown Atlanta Location within Atlanta Location within Georgia Location within the United States
- Former names: Wynne-Claughton Building (1925–1929); Mortgage Guaranty Building (1929–1962)

General information
- Architectural style: Beaux-Arts
- Location: 141 Carnegie Way; Atlanta, Georgia, U.S. 30345
- Coordinates: 33.7582°N 84.3881°W
- Construction started: July 3, 1924
- Completed: April 11, 1925
- Cost: $890,000

Height
- Height: 154.3 feet (47.0 m)

Technical details
- Floor count: 12

Design and construction
- Architect: G. Lloyd Preacher
- Wynne-Claughton Building
- U.S. National Register of Historic Places
- Atlanta Historic Building
- NRHP reference No.: 12000148

Significant dates
- Added to NRHP: March 26, 2012
- Designated AHB: July 10, 1990

The Carnegie Building is a historic building located at 141 Carnegie Way in downtown Atlanta, Georgia, United States. Built in 1925 as the Wynne-Claughton Building, the 12-story building was designed by architect G. Lloyd Preacher. It was designated an Atlanta Historic Building in 1990 and was added to the National Register of Historic Places in 2012.

== History ==
The building, originally known as the Wynne-Claughton Building, was constructed in the 1920s to serve as the headquarters for the Wynne-Claughton Company, an Atlanta-based real estate firm created by Morgan T. Wynne and Edward N. Claughton in 1923. Construction of the building started on July 3, 1924 and was completed on April 11, 1925. The building was designed by G. Lloyd Preacher, a prominent Atlanta-based architect who designed several now-historic buildings in Atlanta, including Atlanta City Hall and the Medical Arts Building. After the completion of the building, Preacher relocated his architectural firm into one of the building's offices. Other early tenants in the building included the Oakland Motor Car Company and the Georgia chapter of the Knights of the KKK. In 1929, the building was renamed the Mortgage Guaranty Building. In 1963, the building was renamed to its current name: the Carnegie Building. This may have been in reference to the Carnegie Library in Atlanta, which was located directly across the street from the building.

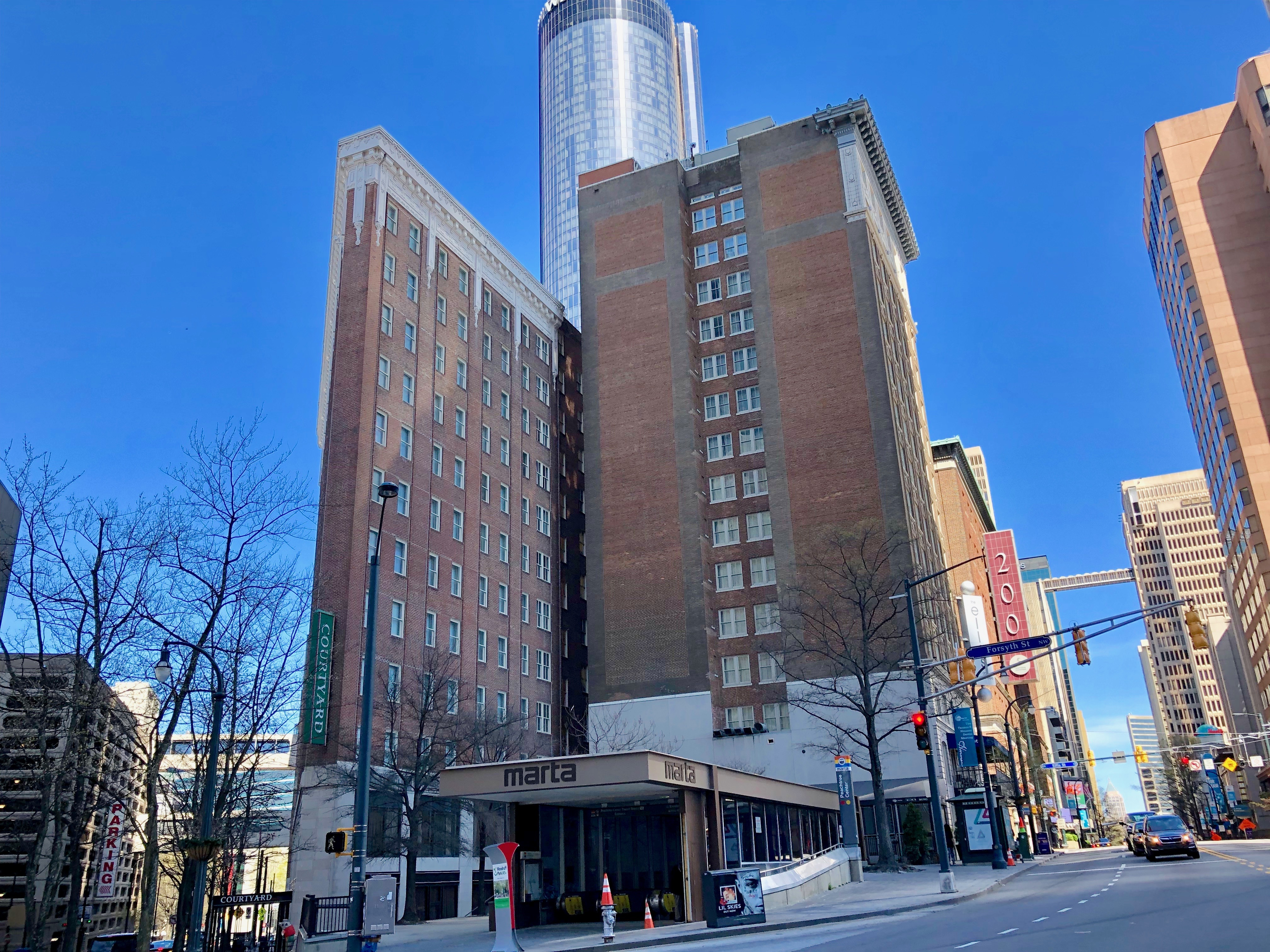
Carnegie Building (left), Ellis Hotel (right), and Peachtree Center station (middle)

The building is located on a triangular-shaped tract of land bordered by Peachtree Street, Carnegie Way, and Ellis Street, which it shares with the Peachtree Center station and the Ellis Hotel (formerly known as the Winecoff Hotel). During the 1946 Winecoff Hotel fire, some people trapped in the nearby Winecoff Hotel attempted to jump across the 10-foot alley separating the two buildings, with many falling to their deaths as a result. Some people managed to escape the fire by climbing across makeshift bridges between the two buildings.

In 1992, the building was purchased and renovated by a development company for $2.5 million. In 2006, King & Spalding, an Atlanta-based law firm and major tenant in the building, left, causing the building to reach over 60% vacancy. Following this, the owners of the Carnegie repurposed the building for use as a boutique hotel. On May 1, 2010, Hotel Indigo opened a location in the Carnegie. Today, the building houses a Courtyard by Marriott.

== See also ==
- National Register of Historic Places listings in Fulton County, Georgia
- Hotels in Atlanta
