= Henry Grady Hotel =

Building in Atlanta, Georgia, United States

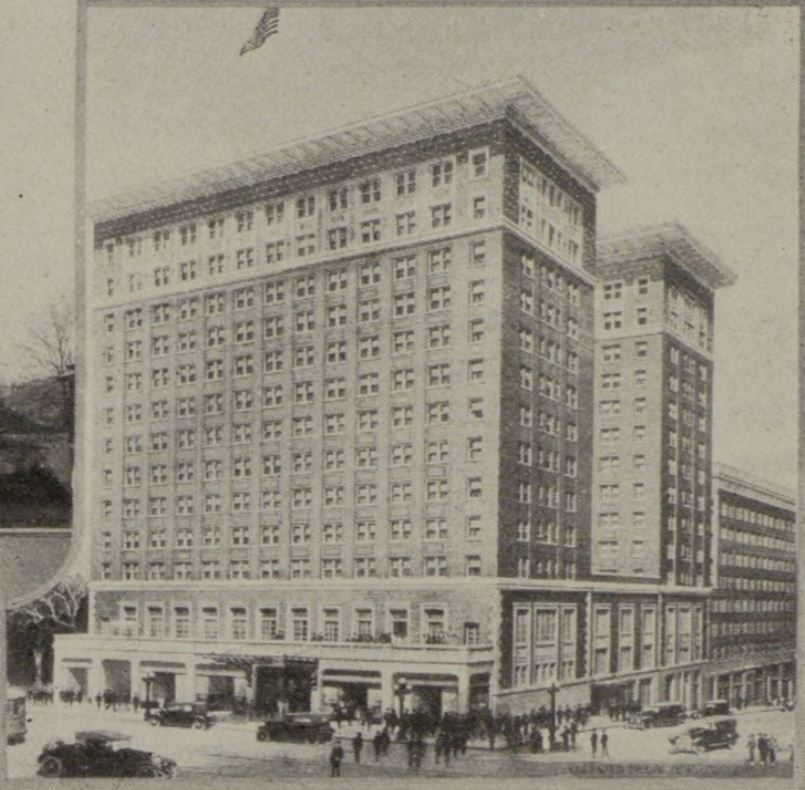
- The Henry Grady Hotel, 1926

General information
- Status: Demolished
- Location: 216 Peachtree Street NW, Atlanta, Georgia, United States
- Coordinates: 33°45′34″N 84°23′16″W
- Completed: 1924
- Demolished: September 4, 1972
- Cost: US$1,000,000
- Owner: Government of Georgia

Technical details
- Floor count: 13

Design and construction
- Architect: G. Lloyd Preacher

The Henry Grady Hotel was a hotel in downtown Atlanta, Georgia, United States. The building, designed by architect G. Lloyd Preacher, was completed in 1924 at the intersection of Peachtree Street and Cain Street, on land owned by the government of Georgia that had previously been occupied by the official residence of the governor. The hotel, which was named after journalist Henry W. Grady, was owned by the state and leased to operators. During the mid-1900s, the hotel typically served as the residence of state legislators during the legislative sessions, and it was an important location for politicking, with President Jimmy Carter (who had previously served in the Georgia State Senate) later saying, "[m]ore of the state's business was probably conducted in the Henry Grady than in the state capitol". In the late 1960s, the government decided to not renew the building's lease when it expired in 1972, and it was demolished that year. The land was sold to developers and the Peachtree Plaza Hotel was built on the site, with construction completed in 1976.

== History ==
=== Background and construction ===
The Henry Grady Hotel was constructed in downtown Atlanta, at the intersection of Peachtree Street and Cain Street (now known as Andrew Young International Boulevard). The site had previously been the location of a Victorian Gothic mansion built in 1869 by architect William H. Parkins for businessman John H. James. That building and the land was later sold to the government of Georgia and was used as the official residence for the governor of Georgia between 1870 and 1921, housing seventeen governors during this time. Governor Hugh Dorsey was the last to live in the mansion, and after Thomas W. Hardwick became governor in 1921, he took up residence in the Georgian Terrace Hotel. In 1923, the building was demolished.

Following the mansion's demolition, construction began on a hotel at the site. The state government still owned the land, as well as the newly constructed hotel building. As a result, state taxes were not required to be paid by the operators of the building, but the government would generate revenue from it by leasing the hotel to private hotel managers. The building, designed by Atlanta-based architect G. Lloyd Preacher, was named the Henry Grady Hotel, after noted Atlanta journalist Henry W. Grady. The building was erected during a construction boom that was going on in the city and was one of several large hotels built during this time, which included the Hotel Ansley, the Atlanta Biltmore Hotel, and the Winecoff Hotel. In an article published by the Atlanta Chamber of Commerce during the hotel's construction, they stated that the Grady would be "one of the largest and most centrally located hotels in the city". The hotel was completed before Thanksgiving in 1924, with an estimated cost of $1 million.

The hotel proved to be a popular locale within the city. In its first few decades, it hosted meetings for the Atlanta League of Women Voters and served as the headquarters for radio station WATL. It was a popular venue for many of the big bands that visited Atlanta in the early 1900s, including the Coon-Sanders Original Nighthawk Orchestra. Starting in 1949, performers Dick Van Dyke and Phil Erickson had a five-year residency at the hotel.

=== Political importance ===
However, the hotel was probably most notable for its connections to Georgian politics, with historian Floyd Hunter calling the hotel "politically famous". In the early 1900s, the Kimball House hotel had served as the lodging for state legislators while they were staying in Atlanta, Georgia's capital city. However, by 1930, the Henry Grady Hotel had become many politicians' Atlanta residences during the legislative sessions, and as a result, a great deal of politicking took place in the building. Influential politician Roy V. Harris had a suite in the building, with former Governor Herman Talmadge later describing it as a smoke-filled room. During the three governors controversy of 1947, both Talmadge and Melvin E. Thompson, who both claimed to be the legitimate governor, had their offices located in the hotel. In the 1960s, the hotel served as the campaign headquarters for Lester Maddox in his 1966 gubernatorial campaign, and the American Independent Party held their Georgia meeting at the hotel as part of George Wallace's 1968 presidential campaign. Additionally, the National Knights of the Ku Klux Klan had held a meeting and established a national committee in the hotel in 1960.

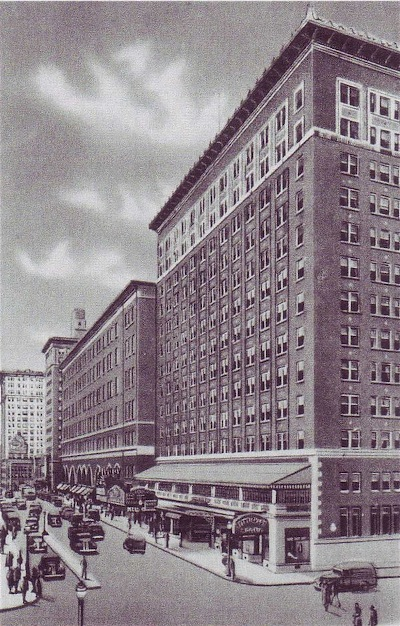
The Henry Grady Hotel (right), looking south down Peachtree Street, c. 1927

According to U.S. President Jimmy Carter, "[m]ore of the state's business was probably conducted in the Henry Grady than in the state capitol". Supporting this statement, a Georgia State Senator E. F. Griffith once said, "I don't believe the people of Georgia will ever know what's going on ... until they put loudspeakers in the Henry Grady Hotel and a few microphones under certain beds or behind the furniture". As an example, in 1946, Atlanta Mayor William B. Hartsfield first proposed plans for what would become the Downtown Connector roadway. Noted individuals who had suites in the hotel included businessman J. B. Fuqua, who stayed there to be closer to Georgian politicians, and Steadman Vincent Sanford, who served as the president of the University of Georgia and, later, the chancellor of the University System of Georgia.

In addition to its importance as a place of politicking, multiple individuals have made note of illicit acts and the atmosphere of debauchery that existed in the hotel while the politicians were there. During the Prohibition era in the 1930s, legislators would have couriers deliver illegal corn whiskey from Habersham County and Rabun County to the hotel. In a 1992 autobiography, Carter made note to an annual party that politicians held at the hotel on the first day of the legislative session. In a 1997 biography of Governor Zell Miller, biographer Richard Hyatt included a brief summary of such a party at the hotel on January 6, 1961, the first day of that year's legislative session, with legislators drinking alcohol, gambling, and holding a raffle among themselves for a chance to spend the night with a prostitute. Journalists for local newspapers, such as Bill Shipp of The Atlanta Constitution, would sometimes publish accounts of ongoings in the hotel, but many considered the topic off-limits and were largely uncritical of the events unfolding there.

=== Civil Rights protesting ===
During the civil rights movement of the 1960s, the hotel was targeted by protestors because of its policy of racial segregation. On March 13, 1963, several African American students from the Atlanta University Center attempted to get seats at a restaurant in the hotel's lobby, but were denied based on their race. After two of the students refused to leave the premises, they were arrested. The other students who were not arrested staged a lie-in in the lobby that was later given national coverage in the magazine Jet. Additionally, the Committee on Appeal for Human Rights led a picketing protest outside the hotel. The hotel eventually desegregated following the passage of the Civil Rights Act of 1964.

=== Demolition ===
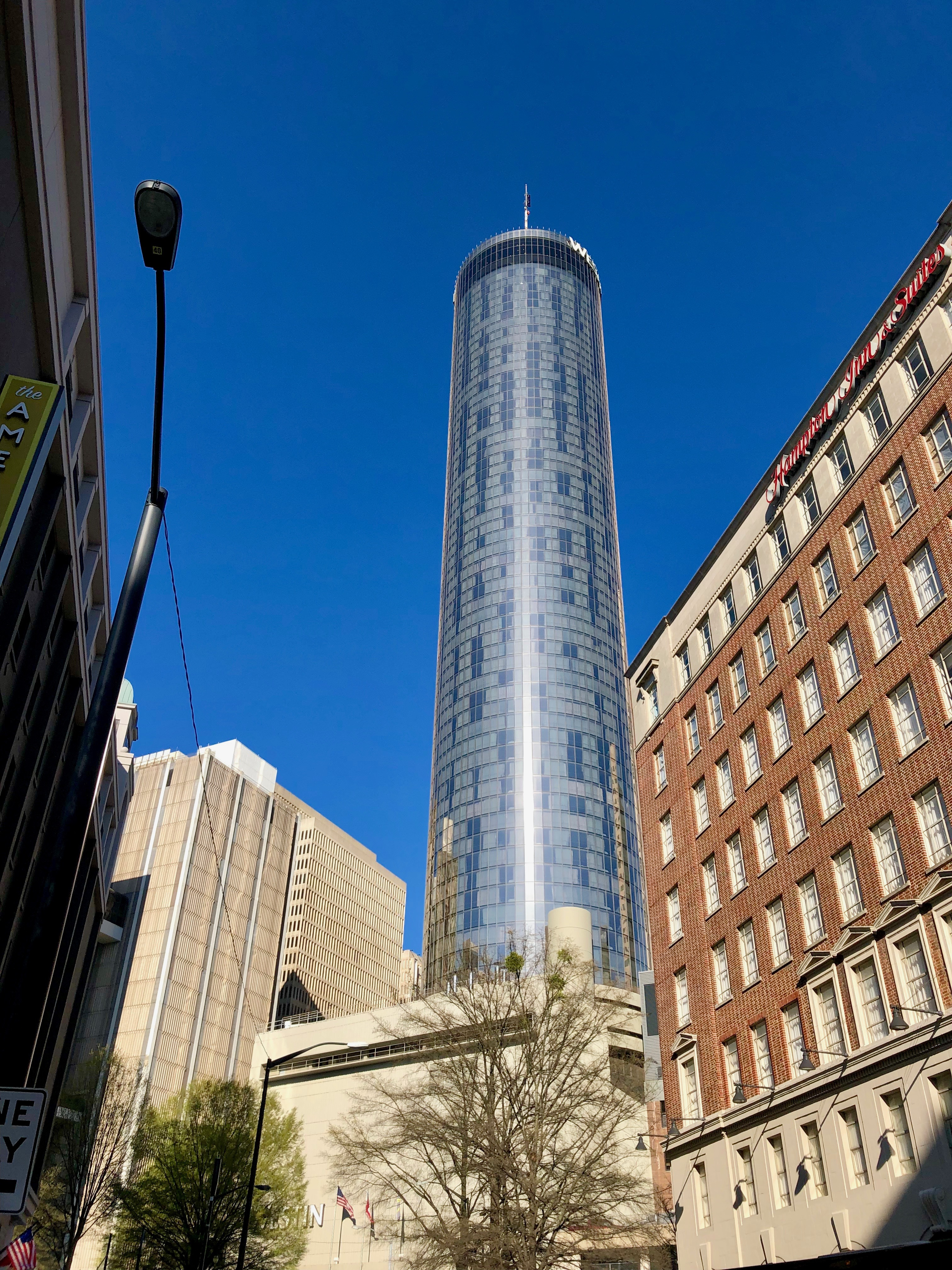
The Peachtree Plaza Hotel was constructed on the site of the Henry Grady Hotel.

In 1967, Georgia State Representative Tom Murphy, who was also a member of the State Properties Control Commission, argued that the hotel should be demolished and the land sold for private development. In his argument, he stated that the hotel was old and any operator of the building would be unlikely to fund renovations for the state-owned property. Additionally, the government could make more money in taxes from the property than it could from the lease. After some debate, it was decided to allow the building to stand until its current lease expired in 1972. On Labor Day of that year, the hotel was demolished by dynamite. In its place, the John C. Portman-designed Peachtree Plaza Hotel was constructed. This new hotel, which was completed in 1976, was at the time of its construction the tallest hotel building in the world.

== Architecture ==
The Henry Grady Hotel was located in downtown Atlanta, on the same city block as Davison's flagship department store, which was completed in the 1920s. The hotel had 13 floors, though in an example of triskaidekaphobia, the 13th floor was actually labeled the 14th floor. (Note: Several sources, including Atlanta historian Franklin Garrett and the Henry Grady Hotel entry on Emporis, state that the building had 13 floors. However, other sources state that the hotel had 11 floors, 12 floors, and 14 floors.) Additionally, no room numbers ended in "13". The hotel had 550 bedrooms and was finished with a stone and red brick façade, with the front entrance having a glass-covered veranda. In 1942, there were plans to add a 32-floor extension to the hotel that would have made it the tallest building in the city, though this plan never came to fruition.

== See also ==
- Hotels in Atlanta

== Sources ==
- Allen, Frederick (1996). Atlanta Rising: The Invention of an International City 1946–1996 (First ed.). Atlanta: Longstreet Press. ISBN 978-1-56352-296-3.
- Alter, Jonathan (2021). His Very Best: Jimmy Carter, A Life (First Simon & Schuster Paperback ed.). New York City: Simon & Schuster. ISBN 978-1-5011-2554-6.
- Asher, Gene (2005). Legends: Georgians Who Lived Impossible Dreams (First ed.). Macon, Georgia: Mercer University Press. ISBN 978-0-86554-977-7.
- Black, David (1999). Atlanta: The Making of a World Class City (First ed.). Montgomery, Alabama: Community Communications. ISBN 978-1-58192-002-4.
- Burns, Rebecca (2011). Burial for a King: Martin Luther King Jr.'s Funeral and the Week That Transformed Atlanta and Rocked the Nation (First ed.). New York City: Scribner. ISBN 978-1-4391-3054-4.
- Cannon, William Ragsdale (1999). A Magnificent Obsession: The Autobiography of William Ragsdale Cannon. Foreword by Earl G. Hunt Jr. (First ed.). Nashville, Tennessee: Abingdon Press. ISBN 978-0-687-08575-0.
- Carter, Jimmy (1992). Turning Point: A Candidate, a State, and a Nation Come of Age (First ed.). New York City: Times Books. ISBN 978-0-8129-2079-6.
- Dabney, Joseph Earl (1974). Mountain Spirits: A Chronicle of Corn Whiskey from King James' Ulster Plantation to America's Appalachians and the Moonshine Life (First ed.). New York City: Charles Scribner's Sons. ISBN 978-0-684-13705-6.
- Daniel, Wayne W. (2001). Pickin' on Peachtree: A History of Country Music in Atlanta, Georgia (First paperback ed.). Champaign, Illinois: University of Illinois Press. ISBN 978-0-252-06968-0.
- Edmiston, Fred W. (2003). The Coon-Sanders Nighthawks: "The Band That Made Radio Famous" (First ed.). Jefferson, North Carolina: McFarland & Company. ISBN 978-1-4766-1229-4.
- Fuqua, J. B. (2001). Fuqua: How I Made My Fortune Using Other People's Money (First ed.). Atlanta: Longstreet Press. ISBN 978-1-56352-680-0.
- Garrett, Franklin M. (1969). Atlanta and Environs: A Chronicle of Its People and Events, 1880s-1930s. Vol. II (First ed.). Athens, Georgia: University of Georgia Press. ISBN 978-0-8203-3904-7.
- Garrison, Webb (1987). The Legacy of Atlanta: A Short History (First ed.). Atlanta: Peachtree Publishers. ISBN 978-0-934601-14-6.
- Gournay, Isabelle (1993). Sams, Gerald W. (ed.). AIA Guide to the Architecture of Atlanta. Foreword by Dana F. White (First ed.). Athens, Georgia: University of Georgia Press. ISBN 978-0-8203-1439-6.
- Grady-Willis, Winston A. (2006). Challenging U.S. Apartheid: Atlanta and Black Struggles for Human Rights, 1960–1977 (First ed.). Durham, North Carolina: Duke University Press. ISBN 978-0-8223-3791-1.
- Gray, Michael (2009). Hand Me My Travelin' Shoes: In Search of Blind Willie McTell (U.S. ed.). Chicago: Chicago Review Press. ISBN 978-1-56976-337-7.
- Griffin, Sam M. Jr.; Chalker, Roy F. Sr. (1988). "S. Marvin Griffin: Georgia's 72nd Governor". In Henderson, Harold P.; Roberts, Gary L. (eds.). Georgia Governors in an Age of Change: From Ellis Arnall to George Busbee (First ed.). Athens, Georgia: University of Georgia Press. pp. 113–130. ISBN 978-0-8203-1004-6.
- Gurr, Charles Stephen (1999). The Personal Equation: A Biography of Steadman Vincent Sanford (First ed.). Athens, Georgia: University of Georgia Press. ISBN 978-0-8203-2108-0.
- Gwin, Yolande (1983). Yolande's Atlanta: From the Historical to the Hysterical (First ed.). Atlanta: Peachtree Publishers. ISBN 978-0-931948-43-5.
- "Eutaw Hotel of Orangeburg, South Carolina". The Hotel Monthly. 35 (406): 51–54. January 1927.
- Houser, Fred (October–November 1923). "Spend the Winter in Atlanta". The City Builder. 8 (8–9). Atlanta Chamber of Commerce: 4–5.
- Houser, Fred (January 1924). "Convention Bureau Closes Most Successful Year in its History". The City Builder. VIII (11). Atlanta Chamber of Commerce: 11.
- Hunter, Floyd (1980). Community Power Succession: Atlanta's Policy-Makers Revisited (First ed.). Chapel Hill, North Carolina: University of North Carolina Press. ISBN 978-0-8078-1314-0.
- Hyatt, Richard (1997). Zell: The Governor Who Gave Georgia HOPE (First ed.). Macon, Georgia: Mercer University Press. ISBN 978-0-86554-577-9.
- Hyatt, Richard (2003). Charles H. Jones: A Biography (First ed.). Macon, Georgia: Mercer University Press. ISBN 978-0-86554-759-9.
- Kahn, Michael (May 20, 2015). "Ted Turner Blvd to Join Long List of Switched Street Names". Curbed Atlanta. Vox Media. Archived from the original on October 19, 2021.
- Keegan, Tom (2002). Ernie Harwell: My 60 Years in Baseball. Foreword by Al Kaline; Afterword by Brooks Robinson (First ed.). Chicago: Triumph Books. ISBN 978-1-57243-451-6.
- King, Spencer Bidwell Jr. (June 1969). "A Yankee Who Served the South". The Atlanta Historical Bulletin. XIV (2). Atlanta Historical Society: 7–30.
- Kruse, Kevin M. (2005). White Flight: Atlanta and the Making of Modern Conservatism (First ed.). Princeton, New Jersey: Princeton University Press. ISBN 978-1-4008-4897-3.
- Kytle, Calvin; Mackay, James A. (1998). Who Runs Georgia?: A Contemporary Account of the 1947 Crisis that Set the Stage for Georgia's Political Transformation. Foreword by Dan T. Carter (First ed.). Athens, Georgia: University of Georgia Press. ISBN 978-0-8203-2075-5.
- Laite, W. E. Jr. (1972). The United States vs. William Laite (First ed.). Washington, D.C.: Acropolis Books. ISBN 978-0-87491-324-8.
- Lefever, Harry G. (2005). Undaunted by the Fight: Spelman College and the Civil Rights Movement, 1957–1967 (First ed.). Macon, Georgia: Mercer University Press. ISBN 978-0-86554-976-0.
- Martin, Harold H. (1987). Atlanta and Environs: A Chronicle of Its People and Events: Years of Change and Challenge, 1940-1976. Vol. III (First ed.). Athens, Georgia: University of Georgia Press. ISBN 978-0-8203-0913-2.
- Newton, Louie D. (May 1925). "The Convention Bureau's New Home". The City Builder. Atlanta Chamber of Commerce: 14, 45–50.
- Parsons, Sara Mitchell (2000). From Southern Wrongs to Civil Rights: The Memoir of a White Civil Rights Activist. Foreword by David J. Garrow (First ed.). Tuscaloosa, Alabama: University of Alabama Press. ISBN 978-0-8173-1026-4.
- Risen, Clay (2014). The Bill of the Century: The Epic Battle for the Civil Rights Act (First U.S. ed.). New York City: Bloomsbury Press. ISBN 978-1-60819-824-5.
- Rogers, Ernest (June 1924). "Nineteen Twenty-five Convention Chatter". The City Builder. Atlanta Chamber of Commerce: 31.
- Shavin, Norman; Galphin, Bruce (1985). Atlanta: Triumph of a People (Revised ed.). Atlanta: Capricorn Corporation. ISBN 978-0-910719-12-4.
- Short, Bob (1999). Everything is Pickrick: The Life of Lester Maddox (First ed.). Macon, Georgia: Mercer University Press. ISBN 978-0-86554-662-2.
- Sibley, Celestine (1963). Peachtree Street, U.S.A.: An Affectionate Portrait of Atlanta (First ed.). Garden City, New York: Doubleday & Company. ISBN 978-0-934601-04-7.
- Smith, DeFord (December 1923). "Sixteen Years Hence". The City Builder. Atlanta Chamber of Commerce: 68.
- Smith, Ralph (December 1925b). "Atlanta to Have South's Finest Store". The City Builder. Atlanta Chamber of Commerce: 4–5, 46–48.
- Smith, W. R. C. (February 1925a). "President Smith's Inaugural Address". The City Builder. Atlanta Chamber of Commerce: 5, 48–54.
- Steed, Hal (August 1924). "Atlanta Enjoys Steady Building Program". The City Builder. Atlanta Chamber of Commerce: 17, 43.
- Talmadge, Herman E. (1987). Talmadge: A Political Legacy, A Politician's Life: A Memoir. With Mark Royden Winchell (First ed.). Atlanta: Peachtree Publishers. ISBN 978-0-934601-23-8.
- Tatum, J. Henson (December 1923). "The Record of a Tremendous Year". The City Builder. Atlanta Chamber of Commerce: 3–6.
- Trillin, Calvin (1964). An Education in Georgia: The Integration of Charlayne Hunter and Hamilton Holmes (First ed.). New York City: Viking Press. LCCN 64011519.
- Van Dyke, Dick (2011). My Lucky Life in and out of Show Business: A Memoir. Foreword by Carl Reiner (First ed.). New York City: Crown Archetype. ISBN 978-0-307-59223-1.
