= 1947 Pulitzer Prize =

Awards for journalism and related fields

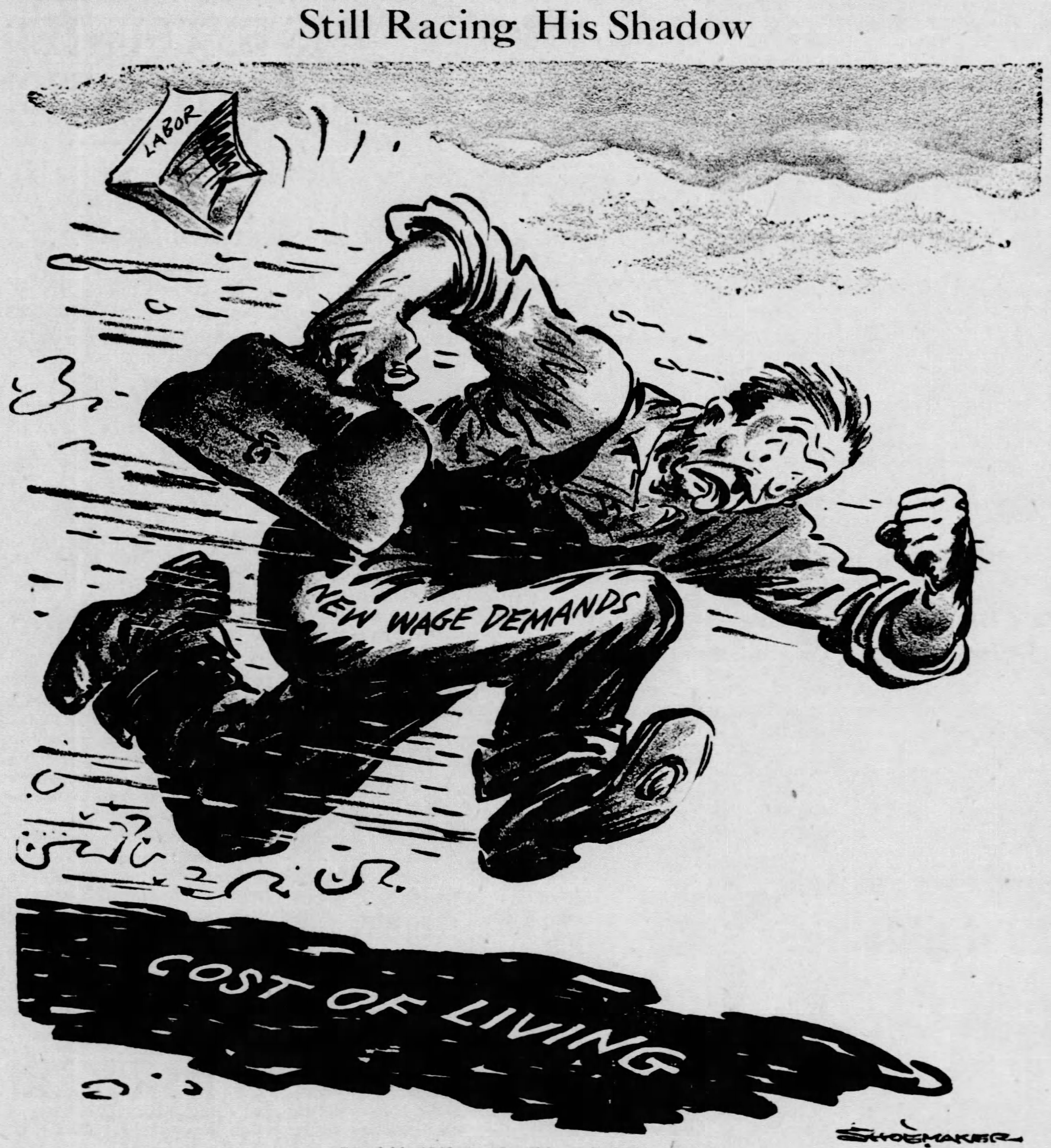
"Still Racing His Shadow", the prize-winning editorial cartoon

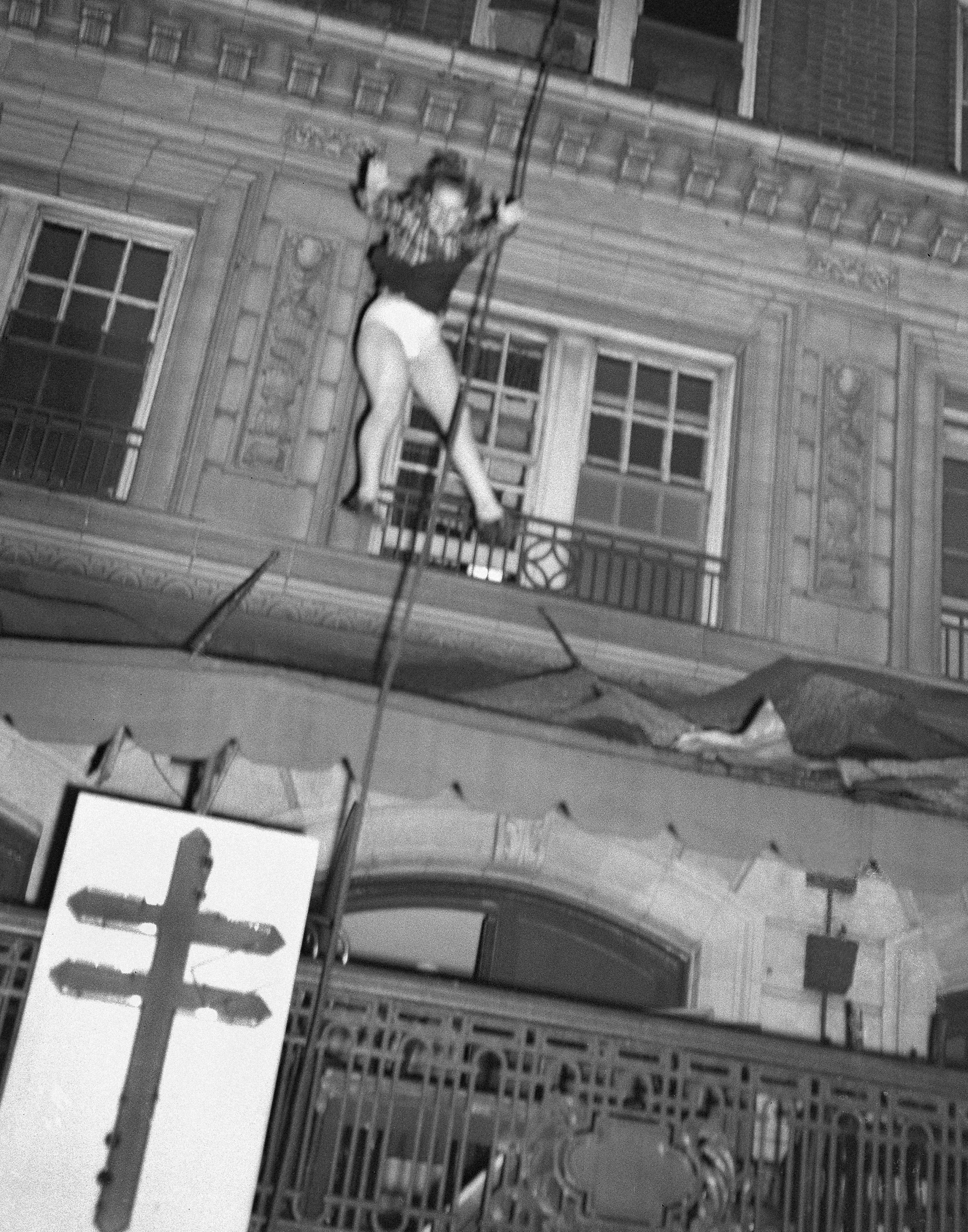
The prize-winning photograph

The following are the Pulitzer Prizes for 1947.

== Journalism awards ==
- Public Service:
  - The Baltimore Sun for its series of articles by Howard M. Norton dealing with the administration of unemployment compensation in Maryland, resulting in convictions and pleas of guilty in criminal court of 93 persons.
- Reporting:
  - Frederick Woltman of the New York World-Telegram for his articles during 1946 on the infiltration of Communism in the U.S.
- Correspondence:
  - Brooks Atkinson of The New York Times for distinguished correspondence during 1946, as exemplified by his series of articles on Russia.
- Telegraphic Reporting (National):
  - Edward T. Folliard of The Washington Post for his series of articles published during 1946 on the Columbians, Inc.
- Telegraphic Reporting (International):
  - Eddy Gilmore of the Associated Press for his correspondence from Moscow in 1946.
- Editorial Writing:
  - William H. Grimes of The Wall Street Journal for his distinguished editorial writing during the year.
- Editorial Cartooning:
  - Vaughn Shoemaker of the Chicago Daily News for his cartoon, "Still Racing His Shadow".
- Photography:
  - Arnold Hardy, amateur photographer of Atlanta, Georgia, for his photo of a woman leaping from a balcony to escape the Winecoff Hotel fire, distributed by the AP.
- Special Citation:
  - In honor of Joseph Pulitzer's 100th birthday and the 30th anniversary of the Prizes, a special citation was made, expressing gratitude to the Columbia University Graduate School of Journalism "for their efforts to maintain and advance the high standards governing these awards", and especially citing the St. Louis Post-Dispatch, the newspaper founded by Pulitzer, "for its unswerving adherence to the public and professional ideals of its founder and its constructive leadership in the field of American journalism".

== Letters, Drama and Music Awards ==
- Novel:
  - All the King's Men by Robert Penn Warren (Harcourt).
- Drama:
  - No award given.
- History:
  - Scientists Against Time by James Phinney Baxter III (Little).
- Biography or Autobiography:
  - The Autobiography of William Allen White by William Allen White (Macmillan).
- Poetry:
  - Lord Weary's Castle by Robert Lowell (Harcourt).
- Music:
  - Symphony No. 3 by Charles Ives (Arrow), first performed by Lou Harrison and Chamber Orchestra in New York, April 1946.
