= Arnold Hardy =

American photographer and Pulitzer Prize winner (1922–2007)

- Born: February 2, 1922; Shreveport, Louisiana, U.S.
- Died: December 5, 2007 (aged 85); Atlanta, Georgia, U.S.
- Education: Georgia School of Technology

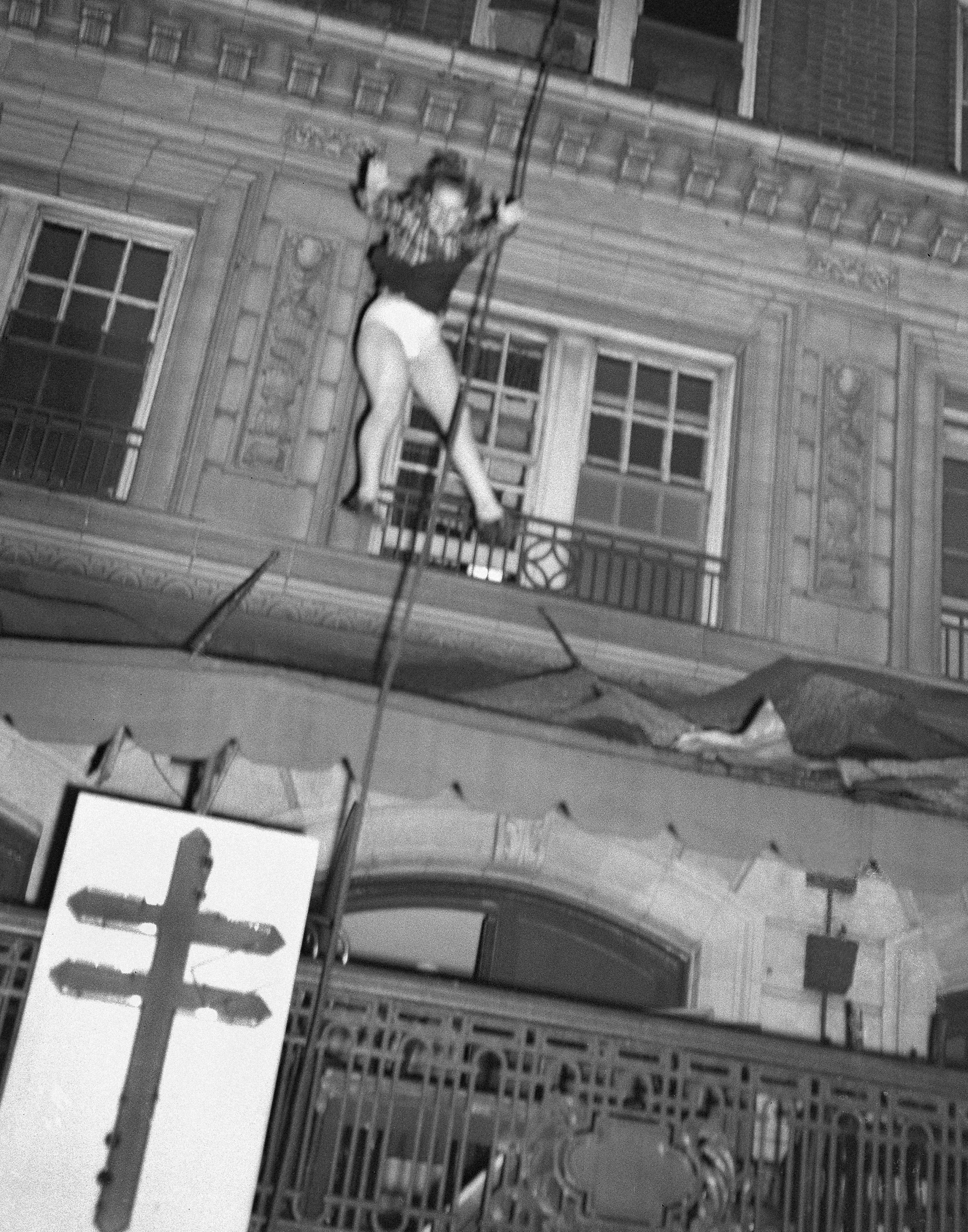
Hardy's Pulitzer Prize-winning photograph

Arnold Hardy (February 2, 1922 – December 5, 2007) was the first amateur photographer who won the 1947 Pulitzer Prize for Photography.

His 1947 award-winning photo of a woman plunging from a window of the burning Winecoff Hotel in Atlanta, Georgia, USA, on December 7, 1946, became the defining image of the fire that killed 119 people. At the time, Hardy was 24 years old and a graduate student at Georgia Tech. He was returning home late from a dance when he heard the fire sirens. At the fire department he was told that the fire was at the Winecoff Hotel. He had a filmpack and only five flashbulbs when he arrived at the scene. Hardy recalled offering help to the firemen, but they refused. He started taking pictures, even though in the darkness it was technically very complicated to adjust the camera. After developing the film, Hardy sold three photos to the Associated Press for $300. According to some sources, the woman died at the scene. However, others identify her as Daisy McCumber, 41, who survived but suffered multiple fractures and had her leg amputated. She died in 1992.

Apart from the Pulitzer Prize, Hardy was awarded five other top photography prizes in 1947. Later he declined a job with the Associated Press and instead began an x-ray equipment business. According to his son, Hardy was only proud that after the wide publication of his shot the fire safety standards around the country were raised significantly. In a 2000 interview, he said that the only photos he took since that time were of family and vacations.

Arnold Hardy died in 2007 at age 85 at the Emory University Hospital in Atlanta of complications following hip surgery.

== Sources ==
- Brennan, Elizabeth A.; Clarage, Elizabeth C. (1999). Who's who of Pulitzer Prize Winners. Phoenix: Oryx Press. p. 498. ISBN 1-57356-111-8.
- Faber, John (1960). Great News Photos and the Stories Behind Them. New York: Dover Publications. p. 96. ISBN 9780486236674.
- Lester, Paul Martin (2018). Visual Ethics: A Guide for Photographers, Journalists, and Filmmakers. New York: Routledge. ISBN 978-1-315-45513-6.
