= Edward T. Folliard =

American journalist

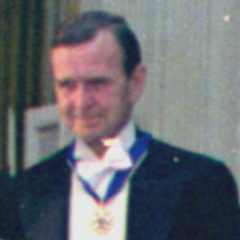
- Folliard receiving the Presidential Medal of Freedom in 1970.
- Born: Edward Thomas Folliard; May 14, 1899; Washington, D.C.
- Died: October 25, 1976 (aged 77)
- Occupation: Journalist
- Spouse: Helen Liston Folliard
- Children: Michael Folliard, Nancy O'Mahony
- Writing career
- Subjects: The White House, national news
- Notable awards: Pulitzer Prize for Telegraphic Reporting; 1947; Presidential Medal of Freedom; 1970

Edward Thomas Folliard (May 14, 1899 – November 25, 1976) was an American journalist. He spent most of his career at The Washington Post, for which he covered the White House from the presidency of Calvin Coolidge to that of Lyndon B. Johnson. He had friendly relations with both Harry S. Truman and Dwight D. Eisenhower that continued beyond those men's presidencies.

In addition to covering the presidency, Folliard also reported on many major news events such as Charles Lindbergh's transatlantic flight. During World War II, he reported from European battlefronts and POW camps.

He won several awards, including the 1947 Pulitzer Prize for Telegraphic Reporting (National) and the Presidential Medal of Freedom, which was presented to him by President Richard M. Nixon.

== Early life and education ==
He was born in Washington, D.C. His parents had immigrated to the U.S. from Ireland. He grew up in the Foggy Bottom neighborhood and attended public and parochial schools in the District.

== Career ==
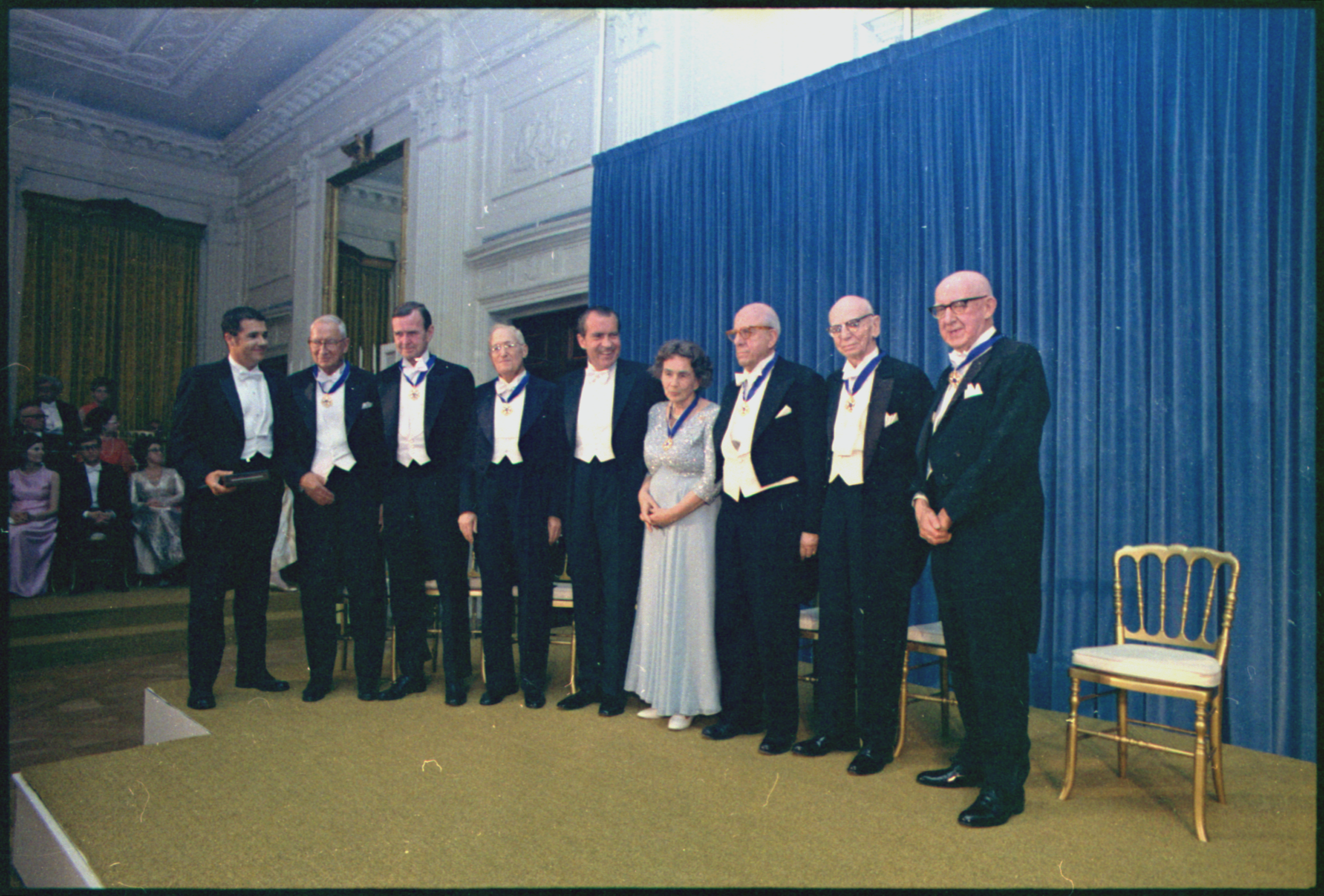
Folliard, third from the left in this image, accepts the Presidential Medal of Freedom from President Richard Nixon on April 22, 1970.

He was interested in journalism from an early age. He later said, "The newspaper bug got me and it got me bad. It devoured me!" At the age of 17 he went to work as a copyboy for the Washington bureau of the International News Service.

In 1917, he joined the Navy, "made 20 crossings of the Atlantic and survived the wreck of the U.S.S. Piave which sank in the Strait of Dover. He also served as a correspondent for Stars and Stripes before leaving the Navy in 1919."

He began working in 1922 as a reporter for the Washington Herald. He covered police news, including "murders, fires, robberies and accidents." His first "scoop" was a story about Warren G. Harding's dog, Laddie Boy, who, Folliard learned, was being sneaked out of the White House by a servant to provide stud services.

He left the Herald for The Washington Post in 1923, doing general assignments as well as reporting on the police, local politics, and national politics. His earliest bylines were on articles about the cinema.

He was fired from the Post in 1932. He returned to the Herald, then went back to the Post in 1934 after the paper's purchase by Eugene Meyer. He remained at the Post until his retirement in 1967, and continuing to contribute occasional articles to the paper thereafter. The Post's online archives contain over 5000 articles under Folliard's byline.

=== Covering the presidency ===
He began covering the presidency during the Coolidge administration, later explaining that he had reported on the Coolidge White House "not as a steady thing, but at least I covered Mr. Coolidge's press conferences." He went on to cover President Hoover "for most of his administration." He was the Post's White House correspondent under Franklin D. Roosevelt from 1941 to the autumn of 1944, at which time he was sent to Europe to cover the war. After V-E Day he resumed his duties as White House reporter.

Folliard was especially close to President Truman, saying in a 1970 interview that "knowing Mr. Truman and having the relationship I did with him enriched my life. I never felt any awe around him. He didn't want me to." Folliard pointed out that despite widespread belief "that the civil rights movement began with Roosevelt," FDR in fact "never lost a Southern state in an election." Civil rights, he maintained, actually began with Truman, who "started integrating the troops in the armed services," thus alienating many southern whites.

Knowing Folliard was a Catholic, President Truman arranged for him to receive a rosary blessed by the Pope. "Well, here's a man, lord, with all of his concerns, in fact, with the fate of the world at stake, remembering something like that," Folliard later said. "I never got over it. Of course, I've cherished that rosary. I wrote the President a note thanking him. I guess you gather from all this that Mr. Truman was a sort of a hero to me."

Folliard played a key role in the famous incident when his Post colleague Paul Hume criticized Margaret Truman's singing in an article and President Truman replied with an angry letter. Hume "didn't believe it was from President Truman," but when he showed it to Folliard, Folliard identified the handwriting as Truman's. Although the Post "had no intention of ever making the letter public," The Washington Daily News got wind of it and reported on it, whereupon Post publisher Phil Graham asked Folliard to explain what had happened to Steve Early, who was acting presidential press secretary at the time. Folliard did go to the White House, but spoke not with Early but with presidential aide Matt Connelly.

In 1955, Folliard stayed with Eisenhower for seven weeks during his recovery from a heart attack in Denver.

When Truman was invited to the 1956 Gridiron Club dinner, the former president declined the invitation because he did not want to encounter another invited guest, then Vice President Richard M. Nixon, who had publicly called Truman a traitor. It was Folliard to whom Truman wrote explaining his refusal to come, and it was Folliard who somehow persuaded Truman to change his mind and attend the dinner.

"I was never on intimate terms with John F. Kennedy," Folliard said in a 1967 interview, "but knew him reasonably well." After Kennedy was elected president, Folliard "wrote a story saying that the talk about Kennedy buying his victory was nonsense." Folliard himself said, "My admiration of Kennedy is just without limit. I just think he was probably the most brilliant President of our time." Folliard accepted Pierre Salinger's claim that Kennedy had written "the whole of his Inaugural Address," which Folliard called "the best Inaugural speech I ever heard."

Folliard reported on the 1963 White House ceremony in which Sir Winston Churchill was awarded honorary American citizenship. "Heavy clouds floated overhead," wrote Folliard, "but the scene was brightened by some of the most luminous prose ever heard in Washington."

In March 1962, Folliard wrote for America magazine about the presidential prospects of George Romney, which, he noted, had been advanced by words of support from Nixon and Eisenhower. Folliard noted that Romney would be testing his electability by running for governor of Michigan in November 1962. In answer to the question of why the GOP would "choose a novice" when Nixon, Rockefeller and Goldwater were all available, Folliard explained that as in 1940, "the Republicans now see a popular Democrat in the White House and doubt whether any of their pros can dislodge him."

Folliard was in the motorcade in Dallas when Kennedy was assassinated. He wrote the page one article that ran the next day, headlined "President Kennedy Shot Dead; Lyndon B. Johnson Is Sworn In."

Folliard's friendships with Truman and Eisenhower lasted after their presidencies. In 1969, Nixon invited Folliard to come with him on Air Force One to visit Truman in Missouri for his 85th birthday.

=== Hiss Case ===
Folliard opened the August 27, 1948, episode of NBC Radio show Meet the Press with the question to Whittaker Chambers that kept the month-old Hiss Case open through to January 1950:

FOLLIARD: Mr. Chambers, in the hearings on Capitol Hill, you said over and over again that you served in the Communist Party with Alger Hiss. Your remarks down there were privileged. That is to say, you were protected from lawsuits. Hiss has now challenged you to make the same charge publicly. He says that if you do, he will test your veracity by filing a suit for slander or libel. Are you willing to say now that Alger Hiss is or ever was a Communist?
CHAMBERS: Alger Hiss was a Communist and may be now.
FOLLIARD: Mr. Chambers, does that mean that you’re now prepared to go into court and answer to a suit for slander or libel?
CHAMBERS: I do not think that Mr. Hiss will sue me for slander or libel.

He pursued the issue doggedly throughout the episode:

FOLLIARD: Mr. Chambers, to go back to that opening question, you accepted Alger Hiss' challenge and publicly said that he had been at least a member of the Communist Party. Does that mean that you are now prepared to go into Court and answer a suit for slander or libel?
CHAMBERS: I do not think Mr. Hiss will sue me for slander or libel.

Hiss did sue Chambers, a month later. However, by year-end 1948, the U.S. Department of Justice had indicted Hiss on two counts of perjury. In January 1950, after a second trial, Hiss received a guilty verdict on both counts and went to prison.

=== Other Post articles ===
In 1927, he covered Lindbergh's return from Paris. During the Prohibition Era, he reported on a bootlegger who was hiding whiskey in bushes near the White House. He witnessed the execution of Bruno Hauptmann, the kidnapper and killer of the Lindbergh baby. He traveled in the U.S. and Canada with King George and Queen Elizabeth in the late 1930s.

In 1937, Folliard reported on the existence of a secret Soviet camp in upstate New York where members of the U.S. Navy were being trained to spread Communist doctrine among their fellow seamen.

Folliard covered the famous 1939 concert held by Marian Anderson at the Lincoln Memorial and arranged by First Lady Eleanor Roosevelt after the Daughters of the American Revolution had refused to permit the black opera singer to perform at its auditorium, Constitution Hall. "Marian Anderson stood on the steps of the Lincoln Memorial yesterday, sent her matchless contralto voice out over the air and held a crowd of 75,000 enthralled," wrote Folliard. "It was one of the largest assemblages Washington had seen since Lindbergh came back from Paris in '27."

In 1940, he went on a 7,000 mile tour of U.S. bases in the Caribbean. He felt embarrassed on December 7, 1941, because a piece by him appeared in the Post declaring that while the Japan situation was "threatening," diplomacy was still underway. He went to Europe in late 1944, reported on the war. He was a front-line correspondent at the Battle of the Bulge, crossed the Rhine with the Ninth Army, and was in Paris on V-E Day. After V-E Day, he traveled around Germany and visited prisoner-of-war camps.

In 1949 he was sent to New York to interview various gangsters for a series headlined "American Tygoons." After it appeared in about 80 newspapers, his interviewees were called to testify before a Senate committee, and two of them went to jail. In 1954, he wrote a major article about rich Texans who were making large donations to out-of-state politicians. In 1959 he accompanied Eisenhower to Rome to meet with Pope John XXIII, and was selected as the "pool reporter" to witness the actual meeting.

=== Other journalism ===
In addition to reporting for the Post, Folliard also wrote on occasion for the Congressional Digest, The American Mercury, National Geographic, and Nation's Business.

In 1943, he had his own radio program on station WTOP, discussing world events.

== Post-retirement ==
He retired officially from the Post in 1966 but continued writing for the newspaper "well into the 1970s." Among his post-retirement articles were "reminiscences of major events that he had helped to record for history – the attack on Pearl Harbor and White House reaction to it, the Iron Curtain speech of Winston Churchill and summit conferences of world leaders."

== Books ==
He wrote History of the Friendly Sons of St. Patrick of Washington D.C., 1928-1968.

== Memberships ==
He belonged to the Overseas Writers Club, the National Press Club, the Alfalfa Club, and the John Carroll Society.

At various times he served as president of the White House Correspondents' Association and of the Gridiron Club.

== Mona Lisa ==
During a 1962 conversation with French Minister of Cultural Affairs André Malraux, Folliard suggested the idea of sending the Mona Lisa to the U.S. to be exhibited temporarily at the National Gallery. Malraux liked the idea, First Lady Jacqueline Kennedy made the arrangements, and Folliard accompanied the painting across the Atlantic aboard the SS France.

== Honors and awards ==
Secretary of War Robert P. Patterson honored war correspondents, including Folliard, at an event in Washington, on November 23, 1946.

Folliard was awarded the 1947 Pulitzer Prize for Telegraphic Reporting (National) for a series of articles published during the previous year about the Columbians, Inc., a neo-Nazi group in Atlanta.

He had been asked by Philip Graham, who by then had become the Post's publisher, to investigate the group. For the articles, Folliard spent a week in Atlanta interviewing the group's leaders, attending their mass meetings, and listening to their "tirades against Negroes, Jews, the Communists, the rich, and newspaper editors who don't share their views on 'Anglo-Saxon culture.'" The members of the group, he wrote, "dress and swagger in the manner of storm troopers," and their arm patches bore insignias reminiscent of those on SS uniforms. When he won the prize, the editors of the Post wrote in an editorial: "Broadly speaking, good newspaper reporters tend to fall into one of three categories – those whose primary value lies in their ability to uncover important news; those whose value lies primarily in their skill in writing the news, and finally those who have a special aptitude for interpreting the news, that is, for discerning and clarifying the meaning that underlies the superficial facts. Mr. Folliard is one of those rare and invaluable journalists who combines in themselves all three gifts."

In 1959, he won the 15th annual Raymond Clapper Memorial Award for distinguished Washington reporting during the year 1958. The award was for a story about gas bill lobby funds.

He also won the Washington Newspaper Guild Award for human interest and interpretive reporting.

In 1970 he was awarded the Presidential Medal of Freedom by President Nixon as one of seven persons whom Nixon called "giants of journalism".

In 1971 he was one of 12 correspondents named charter members of the Hall of Fame established by the Washington Professional chapter of Sigma Delta Chi, the journalism society.

== Personal life ==
He was married to Helen Liston Folliard. They had a son, Michael, and a daughter, Nancy O'Mahony. He was a Roman Catholic.

Jack Shafer wrote in 2014 that in 1962, Tom Wicker, then an aspiring journalist, asked Folliard "for advice on a political assignment he was working on." Folliard told him that "if you're going to be a political writer, there's one thing you'd better remember. Never let the facts get in your way."

He kept using his old Underwood typewriter after the Post newsroom had replaced them. According to his Post obituary, Folliard "refused to observe margins or to triple space his copy," turning in "some of the 'dirtiest' copy," typed "on an ancient typewriter, long in disrepair, that he insisted on using." He also "refused to part with his antique, upright telephone" on which he had dictated his Pearl Harbor and VJ stories."
