= G. Lloyd Preacher =

American architect

Geoffrey Lloyd Preacher
- Born: May 11, 1882; Fairfax, South Carolina
- Died: June 17, 1972 (aged 90)
- Education: Clemson Agricultural College of South Carolina
- Occupation: Architect

Geoffrey Lloyd Preacher (May 11, 1882 – June 17, 1972) was an American architect. Based in Atlanta, Preacher and his firm specialized mostly in commercial offices, hotels, and apartment buildings in the Southeastern United States.

== History ==
Preacher was born on May 11, 1882, in Fairfax, South Carolina. He graduated from Clemson Agricultural College of South Carolina (now known as Clemson University) in 1904 and found work as a draftsman, a profession he would hold until 1909. In 1911, Preacher won a design competition and soon after began a successful architecture career in Augusta, Georgia.

Throughout his career, Preacher designed 417 structures in seven states, including 45 schools in Atlanta.

== Selected works ==
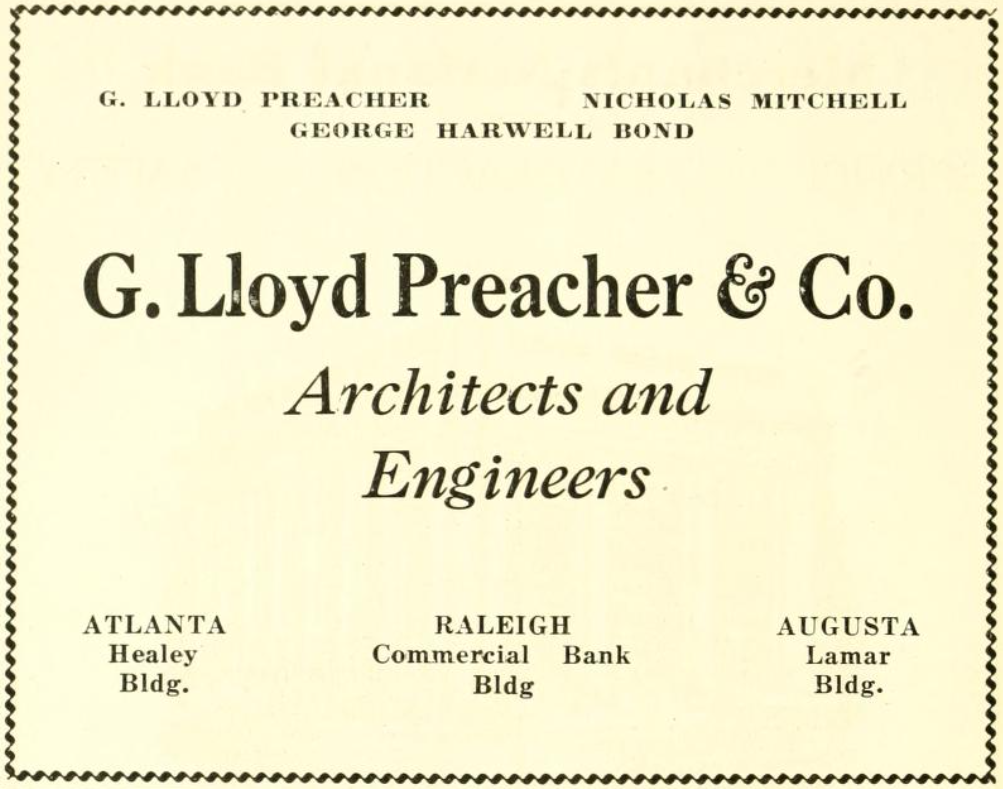
1923 advertisement in a Raleigh, North Carolina, publication

Notable buildings that Preacher and his firm designed include:

- Atlanta City Hall listed on the NRHP
- Briarcliff Hotel in Atlanta, where Asa G. Candler Jr. lived later in life
- Carnegie Building in Atlanta, originally known as the Wynne-Claughton Building. Preacher would move his offices to this building after its completion.
- Henry Grady Hotel in Atlanta. Demolished in 1972 to make way for the Westin Peachtree Plaza Hotel.
- Lamar Building in Augusta, Georgia
- Lincoln County Courthouse (1915), Lincolnton, Georgia
- Medical Arts Building in Atlanta
- Rainbow Terrace in Druid Hills, Atlanta, the mansion built for Lucy Candler Heinz, daughter of Coca-Cola founder Asa Griggs Candler
- Redmont Hotel in Birmingham, Alabama
- Orange Court Hotel (1924), Orlando, Florida. Demolished 1990.

in addition, Preacher's firm designed:

- Seagle Building in Gainesville, Florida
- McCormick County Courthouse in McCormick, South Carolina
- Hotel Eutaw in Orangeburg, South Carolina
