= Frederick Woltman =

American journalist, Pulitzer winner

- Born: Enos Frederick Woltman; March 16, 1905; York, Pennsylvania
- Died: March 6, 1970 (aged 64); Sarasota, Florida
- Occupation: Journalist
- Writing career
- Language: English
- Notable awards: Pulitzer Prize for Reporting

Frederick Woltman (March 16, 1905 – March 6, 1970) was a 20th-century American newspaper journalist for the New York World-Telegram, known as "an anti-communist reporter in the 1940s and early 1950s, best known for criticism of U.S. Senator Joseph McCarthy in a series of articles called "The McCarthy Balance Sheet", which ran July 12–16, 1954.

== Background ==
Enos Frederick Woltman was born in York, Pennsylvania on March 16, 1905.

== Career ==
Until 1929, Woltman taught Philosophy at the University of Pittsburgh, when the Pennsylvania Governor Gifford Pinchot had him fired for an article he had written in the American Mercury about police brutality during a coal strike. Roy Howard of the New York World-Telegram hired him because of it.

After World War II, Woltman received assistance from Victor Lasky on articles about communist infiltration within the United States.

In 1946, Woltman beat out other newspaper investigators into the accusation of Louis F. Budenz that a high-level communist spy was working in the United States and discovered that person was Gerhart Eisler.

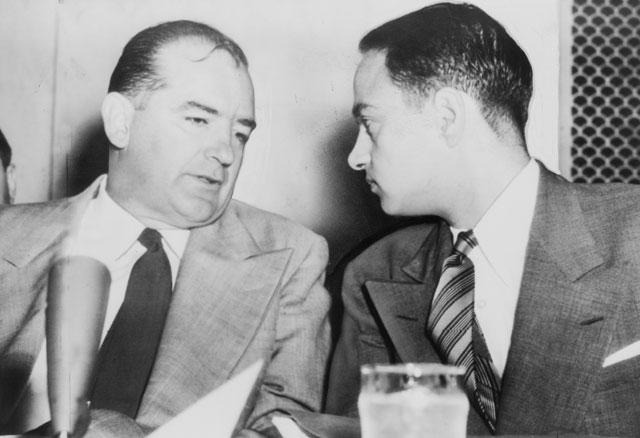
U.S. Senator Joseph McCarthy chats with Roy Cohn (right) at the Army-McCarthy hearings (1954)

Woltman, a reporter with a long-standing reputation as a staunch anti-communist, wrote a five-part series of articles criticizing McCarthy in the New York World-Telegram. He stated that McCarthy "has become a major liability to the cause of anti-communism", and accused him of "wild twisting of facts and near facts [that] repels authorities in the field". In 1954, Time magazine described Woltman as follows:

Long acknowledged the No. 1 newspaper specialist on Reds, he has been exposing Communists since 1938, and, unlike many other anti-Communist writers, he was never a Communist himself. A hard-digging reporter, he backed his stories with solid documentation—e.g., he exposed Gerhart Eisler as the top Kremlin agent in the U.S. the day before the FBI picked Eisler up. ... This week the World-Telly and other Scripps-Howard papers splashed Woltman's five-part series across their pages. His appraisal: McCarthy is "a major liability to the cause of anti-Communism." By making it harder for real Communist-fighters to operate effectively, wrote Woltman, McCarthy has actually become an asset to Communism. "He has introduced a slambang, rabble-rousing, hit-and-run technique into the serious business of exposing the Communist conspiracy ... and thereby disarranged ..."

The story was so controversial that it stirred up coverage itself, including again by Time two issues later: "In their series on Joe McCarthy, the Scripps-Howard papers ... stirred up an even bigger furor than they had expected".

== Later life and death ==
In late April 1957, Woltman suffered a stroke that left him with aphasia. A longtime circus fan, Woltman retired in Sarasota, Florida, in 1959 because it was the winter quarters of Ringling Bros. and Barnum & Bailey Circus. He later died of a heart attack on March 6, 1970.

== Awards ==
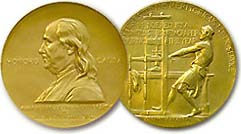
Pulitzer Prize.

- 1947: Pulitzer Prize for Reporting on articles during 1946 on the infiltration of communism in the United States

== See also ==
- 1947 Pulitzer Prize
- Pulitzer Prize for Reporting
- Gerhart Eisler
- Joseph McCarthy
- Nelson Frank
