= Redmont Hotel =

- Hotel Redmont
- U.S. National Register of Historic Places
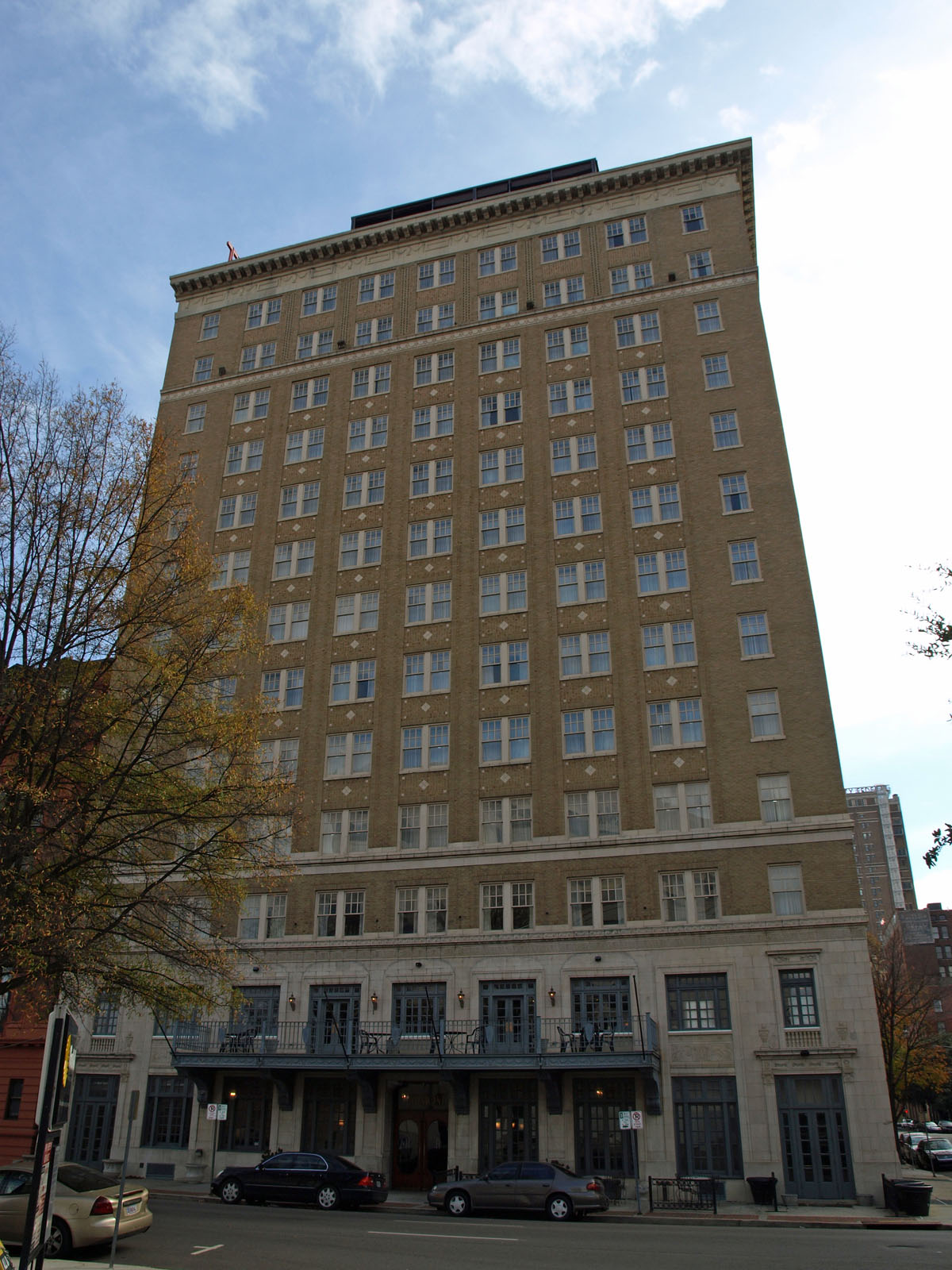

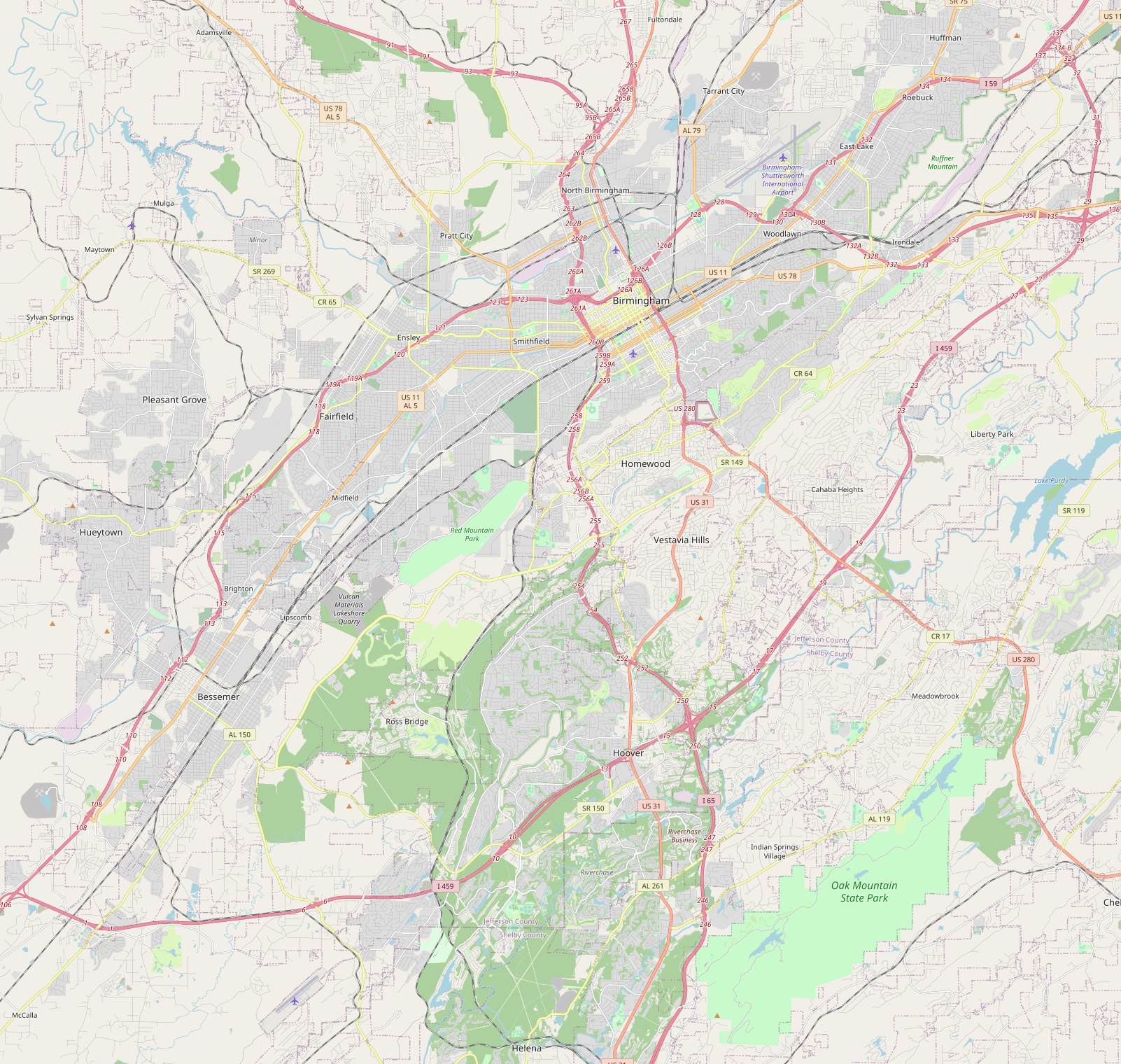
- Location within Birmingham, Alabama Location within Alabama Location within the United States
- Location: 2101 5th Ave N Birmingham, Alabama, US 35203
- Coordinates: 33°31′7.44″N 86°48′23.01″W
- Built: 1925
- Architect: G. Lloyd Preacher, Smallman & Brice
- Architectural style: Chicago
- NRHP reference No.: 83002974
- Added to NRHP: January 27, 1983

The Redmont Hotel Birmingham, or simply the Redmont Hotel, is a 14-story-tall (160 ft; 49 m), 120-room boutique hotel and conference center located on the corner of 5th Avenue North and 21st Street in Birmingham, Alabama, US. The Redmont, named after Birmingham's Red Mountain is the second oldest hotel in Birmingham still in use. It is currently owned by Bayshore Company Tampa, Florida, is managed by Rhaglan Hospitality LLC, and operates as a historic boutique hotel under the Curio Collection by Hilton brand.

== History ==
The Redmont was opened on May 1, 1925, as a 200-room hotel with plans by architect G. Lloyd Preacher of Atlanta, Georgia. It was unusual at its time for having a private bath attached to every room as well as chilled water and ceiling fans. The "Rainbow Room" lounge debuted in 1937 and became the watering hole for an informal group of influential persons called the "Knothole Gang".

In 1946 the hotel was purchased by businessman and hotel magnate Clifford Stiles. In 1947 Stiles converted the entire top floor into a New York-style penthouse apartment for himself and his family. This elegant penthouse was complete with terraces, private elevator, a lawn for pets and was the scene of many glamorous parties. Some say that Stiles, who died in 1975, still haunts the building. In 1952, singer Hank Williams spent the last night of his life in the Redmont on an uncompleted trip from Montgomery to Charleston, West Virginia. One of the suites earned the moniker "the Lucky Governor's Suite" when it served as the local headquarters for the successful Jim Folsom and George Wallace gubernatorial campaigns of the 1940s, '50s and 60s.

After decades of decline, the hotel was purchased in 1983 by an investment group made up of NBA players, including Kareem Abdul-Jabbar and Ralph Sampson. It was added to the National Register of Historic Places on February 27 of that year. A $7 million renovation led to a grand re-opening in 1985. Another refurbishment in 2000 uncovered previously hidden architectural details and cleaned the exterior.

In April 2006 the Redmont's ownership group announced plans to convert its two uppermost floors into nine one- and two-bedroom condominia with another luxury condominium in the penthouse. The condominia would have included hotel services such as housecleaning, valet parking, room service, security and bellhop assistance as well as access to the fitness center. Other plans included adding a coffee bar or doughnut shop at ground level. The owners also dropped their association with Crowne Plaza and began operating the hotel as an independent hotel. Due to the economic environment resulting from the Great Recession, the 2006 renovation plans were indefinitely suspended.

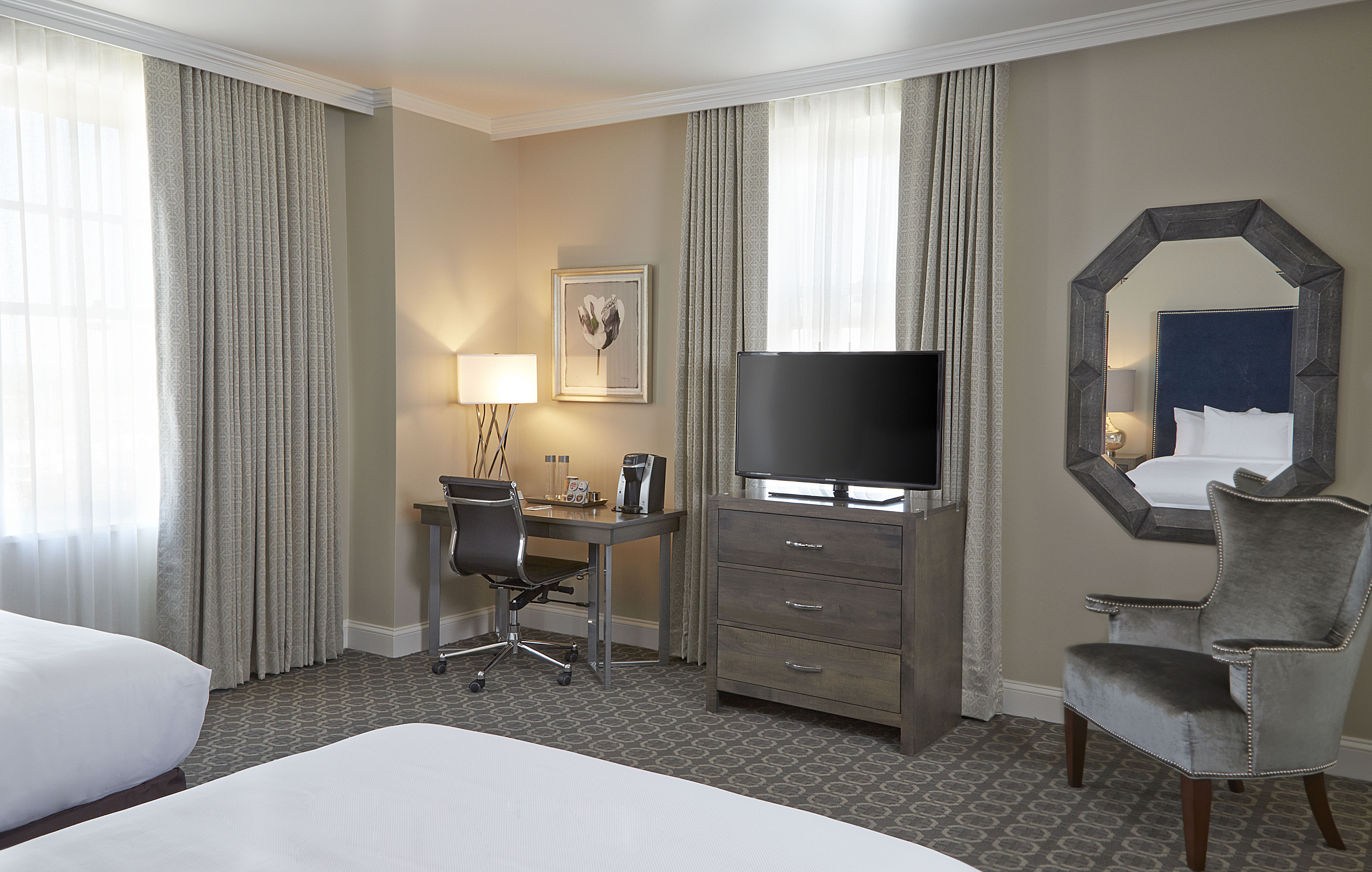

== Current status ==
Following the award of Alabama State Historic Tax Credits in October, 2013, the hotel underwent a multimillion-dollar restoration which began in 2014. The restoration of the Redmont was assisted with financial contributions from the Alabama Historic Rehabilitation Tax Credits and $400,000 in tax incentives from the City of Birmingham. Interior designer Natalie Toy was commissioned to plan the interior design of the building. The work, contracted to local company Stewart Perry, included completely updating all guest rooms, and adding a new independently operated restaurant and bar, along with a café.

The hotel reopened as part of the "Curio Collection by Hilton" brand on March 8, 2016.

The Redmont Hotel in Birmingham now consists of 11 floors with 120 guest rooms.

== Additional references ==
- Williams, Roy L. (April 12, 2006) "Redmont Hotel top floors going condo". Birmingham News.
- Bosley, Anita S. (September 1, 2000) "Building holds clues to '20s-era Birmingham". Birmingham Business Journal.
