= Howard M. Norton =

American journalist

Howard Norton
- Born: May 30, 1911
- Died: March 12, 1994 (aged 82)
- Education: University of Florida (BA)

Howard M. Norton (May 30, 1911 – March 12, 1994) was an American journalist whose work won a Pulitzer Prize.

Howard Norton was born in Haverhill, Massachusetts. He grew up in Florida, and he attended the University of Florida for college. In 1933, he graduated with a bachelor's degree in journalism. After graduation, he moved to Baltimore and became a Foreign correspondent for The Baltimore Sun.

Norton wrote a series of articles "dealing with the administration of unemployment compensation in Maryland, resulting in convictions and pleas of guilty in criminal court of 93 persons." His work won the 1947 Pulitzer Prize for Public Service for The Baltimore Sun.

Norton died of a stroke in Wilmington, North Carolina on March 12, 1994.

== Awards ==
- Pulitzer Prize for Public Service – 1947, The Baltimore Sun, "for its series of articles by Howard M. Norton dealing with the administration of unemployment compensation in Maryland, resulting in convictions and pleas of guilty in criminal court of 93 persons"
- Alumni of Distinction, University of Florida – 1979
