= Eddy Gilmore =

American journalist

Eddy Lanier King Gilmore (May 28, 1907 – October 6, 1967) was a newspaper reporter. He won the 1947 Pulitzer Prize in Telegraphic Reporting-International. Gilmore covered the funerals of Winston Churchill and Joseph Stalin. He was born in Selma on May 28, 1907. 21 years later, in 1928, Gilmore graduated from the Carnegie Institute of Technology, having previously attended Washington and Lee University. The next year, he was hired by the Atlanta Journal, where he would work until 1932. That year Gilmore left to work for The Washington Daily News. After three years, the Associated Press hired him, and after being assigned to Washington, D.C., from 1942 to 1943, Gilmore was chief of AP operations in Russia. While there, he won his Pulitzer Prize for an interview with Joseph Stalin. Gilmore fell in love with Tamara Kolb-Chernashova (a ballet dancer) while there, and began to attempt to marry her. The Soviet Union resisted the marriage and it was not until Wendell Willkie intervened on their behalf that they were allowed to marry in 1950. Gilmore left Russia in 1953 and spent the majority of the rest of his career in London. He died of a heart attack on October 6, 1967. The film Never Let Me Go is based on Gilmore's romance with Tamara Kolb-Chernashova.
