= Medical Arts Building (Atlanta) =

- Medical Arts building
- U.S. National Register of Historic Places
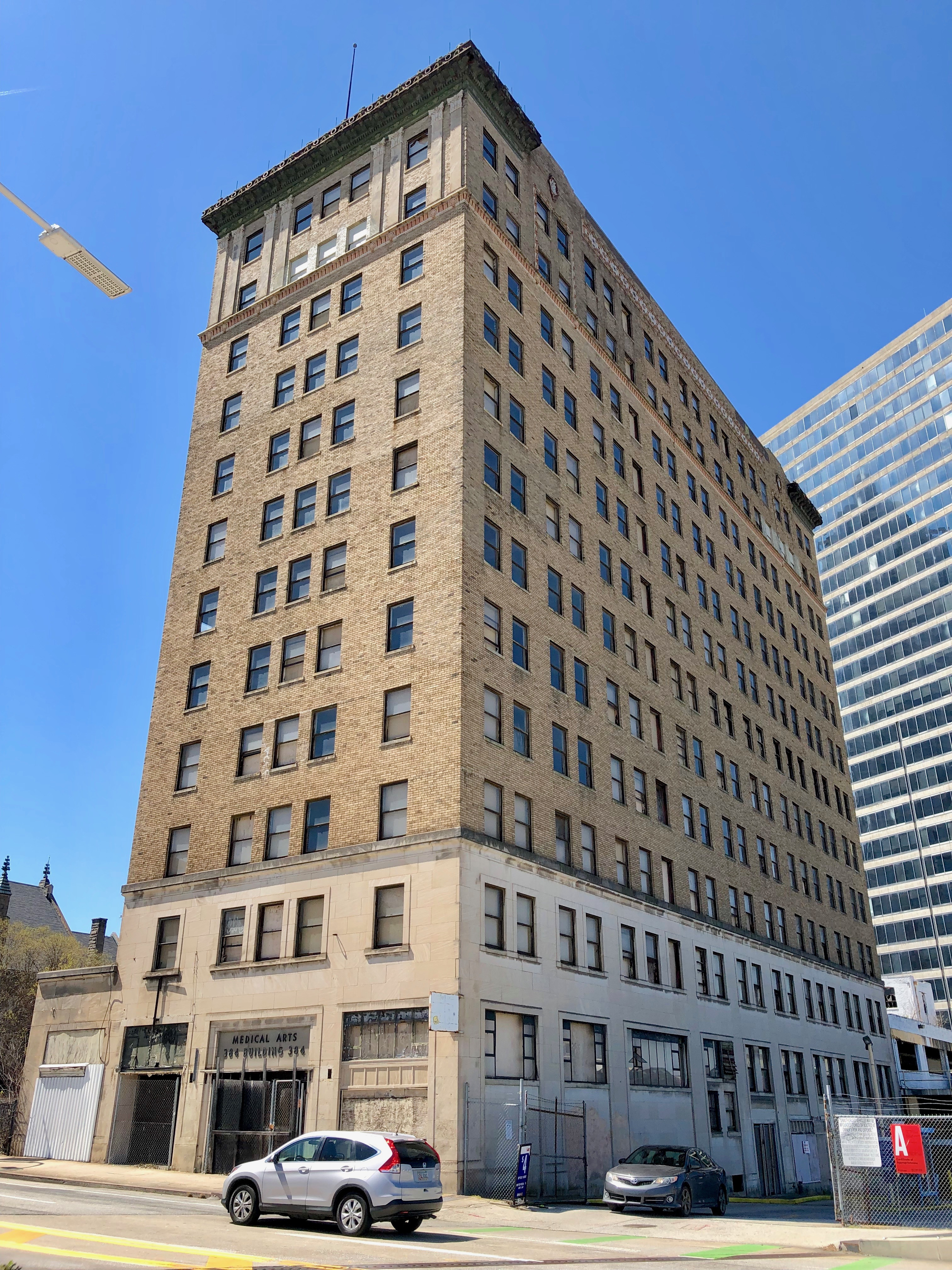
- Medical Arts Building in 2019

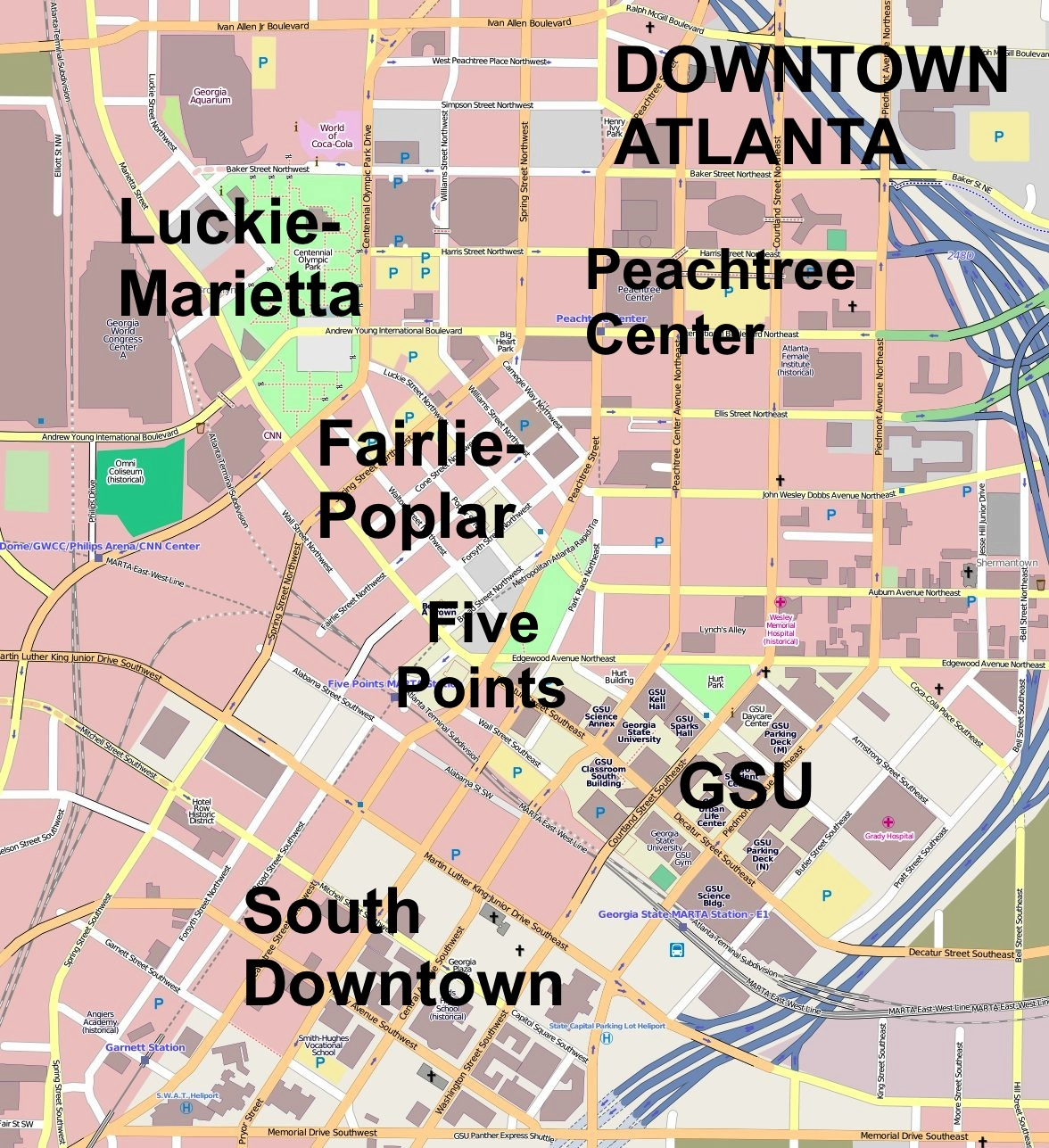
- Location within Downtown Atlanta Location within Atlanta Location within Georgia Location within the United States
- Location: 384 Peachtree Street NE; Atlanta, Georgia
- Coordinates: 33.7649°N 84.3859°W
- Built: 1927
- Architect: G. Lloyd Preacher
- Architectural style: Beaux-Arts
- NRHP reference No.: 16000816
- Added to NRHP: December 6, 2016

The Medical Arts Building is a Beaux-Arts style building located at the northern end of Downtown Atlanta. The 12-story brick and limestone building by architect G. Lloyd Preacher, also designer of Atlanta City Hall, was constructed in 1927. In addition to its medical facilities - deemed as some of the most modern and well-equipped when it opened, the building once featured a cafeteria, drugstore and telegraph office. It was also amongst the first to have a covered parking garage. However, its nearly 89,000 square feet (8,300 m^{2}) of space have been vacant since 1995.

== Recent history ==
In 2001, the building was included on the Atlanta Preservation Center's List of Endangered Buildings.

In 2002, an ordinance was proposed before Atlanta City Council to designate the building as a Landmark Building. The ordinance was passed in October 2005.

In 2003, Crow Hospitality Investment Group had the building under contract with plans to convert it into a small hotel.

In 2004, a business owned by record producer Dallas Austin was in negotiations to buy the building for possible conversion into a boutique hotel from then-owner Harold Gelber, a Miami businessman who had owned the property since the 1970s. Later that year, the building was purchased for $5.25 million by a group of local developers.

On the morning of July 2, 2005, the building suffered damage from a four-alarm fire.

In July 2009, large advertisements for Holiday Inn and Holiday Inn Express were placed on two sides of the building although there was no intention of either hotel occupying the building. The advertisements were eventually removed and were replaced in January 2010 by signs for MetroPCS. In May 2010, an advertisement was posted for Crown Royal Black whisky.

The building is the only one of 10 structures on Central Atlanta Progress's 2003 list of downtown "eyesores" that has not been renovated or repurposed. Therefore, the building remains on the updated list released in December 2009. The building is included on The Georgia Trust's list of 2011 Places in Peril. It was listed on the National Register of Historic Places in 2016.

== See also ==
- National Register of Historic Places listings in Fulton County, Georgia
