= Winecoff Hotel fire =

1946 fire in Atlanta, Georgia

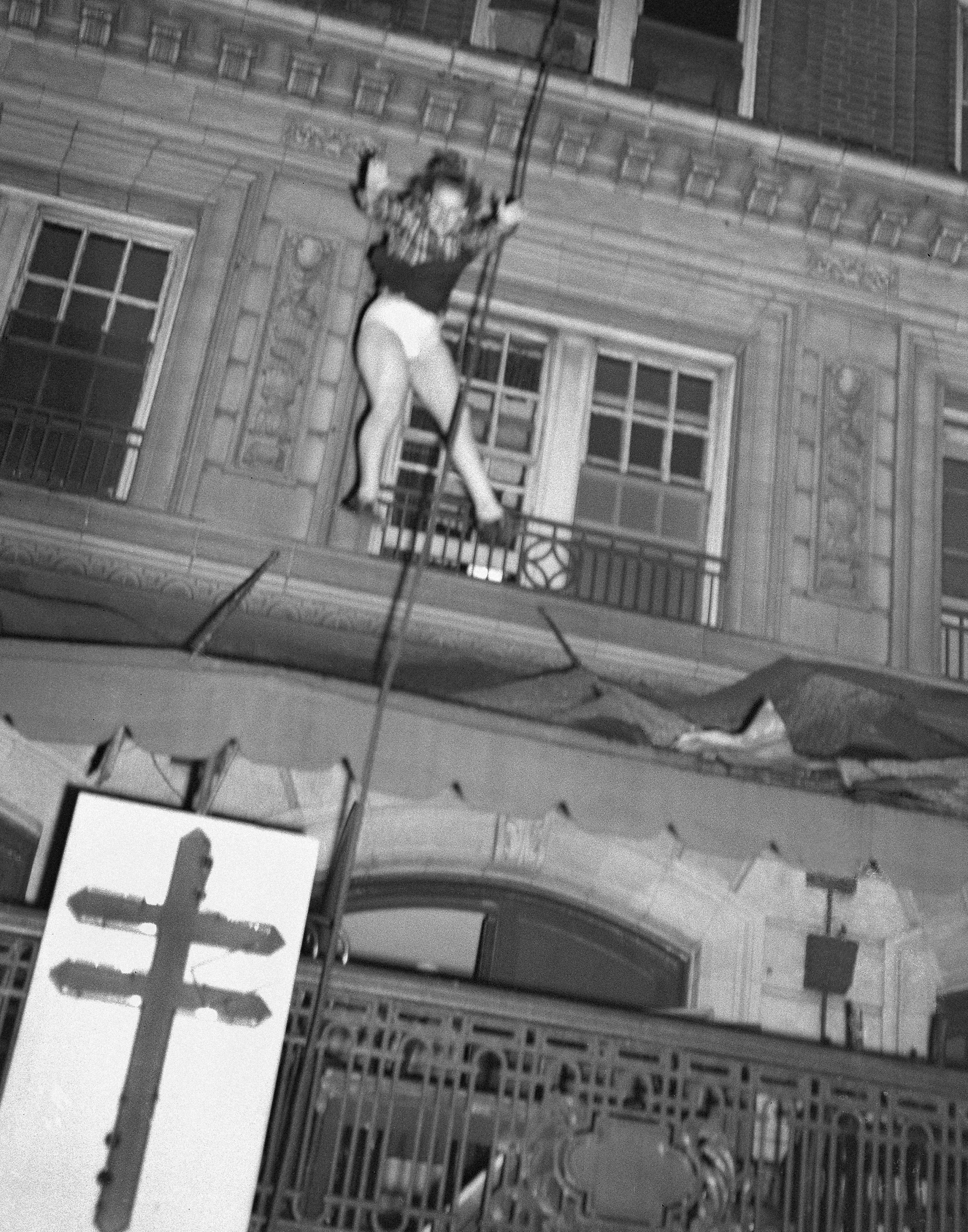
- One of the fire's victims, Daisy McCumber, falls after jumping from a window. She survived, with serious injuries. This photograph by Arnold Hardy won a 1947 Pulitzer Prize.
- Date: December 7, 1946; 79 years ago
- Venue: Winecoff Hotel
- Location: Atlanta, Georgia, U.S.; 33.7583°N 84.3878°W
- Type: Fire
- Cause: Unknown
- Deaths: 119
- Injuries: 65

The Winecoff Hotel fire, of December 7, 1946, was the deadliest hotel fire in American history, killing 119 hotel occupants, including the hotel's original owners. Located at 176 Peachtree Street in Atlanta, Georgia, the Winecoff Hotel was advertised as "absolutely fireproof". While the hotel's steel structure was indeed protected against the effects of fire, its interior finishes were combustible and the building's exit arrangements consisted of a single stairway serving all fifteen floors. All of the hotel's occupants above the fire's origin on the third floor were trapped, and the fire's survivors either were rescued from upper-story windows or jumped into nets held by firemen.

A number of victims jumped to their deaths. A photograph of one survivor's fall won the 1947 Pulitzer Prize for Photography. The fire — which followed the June 5, 1946, La Salle Hotel fire in Chicago (with 61 fatalities), and the June 9, also 1946, Canfield Hotel fire in Dubuque, Iowa (with 19 fatalities) — spurred significant changes in North American building codes, most significantly requiring multiple protected means of egress and self-closing fire-resistant doors for guest rooms in hotels.

== Winecoff Hotel ==
The Winecoff Hotel (now the Ellis Hotel) opened in 1913 as one of the tallest buildings in Atlanta, Georgia. The steel-framed structure was built on a small lot measuring 62.75 feet (19.13 m) by 70 feet (21 m), bounded by Peachtree Street, Ellis Street and an alley, with 4,386 square feet (407.5 m^{2}) per floor. Guest rooms extended from the third to the fifteenth floors, with fifteen rooms on a typical floor. Corridors on guest floors were arranged in an H-shape, with two elevators and the upward flights of stairs opening into the cross halls, and opposing downward runs of stairs converging on a single landing from the legs of the H. The single stairway, of non-combustible construction, was not enclosed with fire-resistant doors. While the use of multiple stairways was becoming common practice in tall buildings, the Atlanta Building Code of 1911 permitted buildings on lots of less than 5,000 square feet (460 m^{2}) to have a single stairway. The steel structure was protected by structural clay tile and concrete fireproofing. The hotel was touted in advertisements and on its stationery as "absolutely fireproof".

Interior partitions, including the walls between corridors and guest rooms, were hollow clay tile covered with plaster. Room doors were 1.5-inch (3.8 cm) wood, with movable transom panels above each door for ventilation between the rooms and the corridors, closed by a wood panel of less than .5 inches (1.3 cm) in thickness. The corridor walls were finished with painted burlap fabric extending up to wainscot height. Guest rooms were finished with as many as seven layers of wallpaper. The hotel had a central fire alarm system, manually operated from the front desk, and a standpipe with hose racks at each floor. There was no automatic sprinkler system.

The Winecoff Hotel was within two blocks of two Atlanta Fire Rescue Department engine and two ladder companies, one of which was within thirty seconds of the building.

== Fire ==
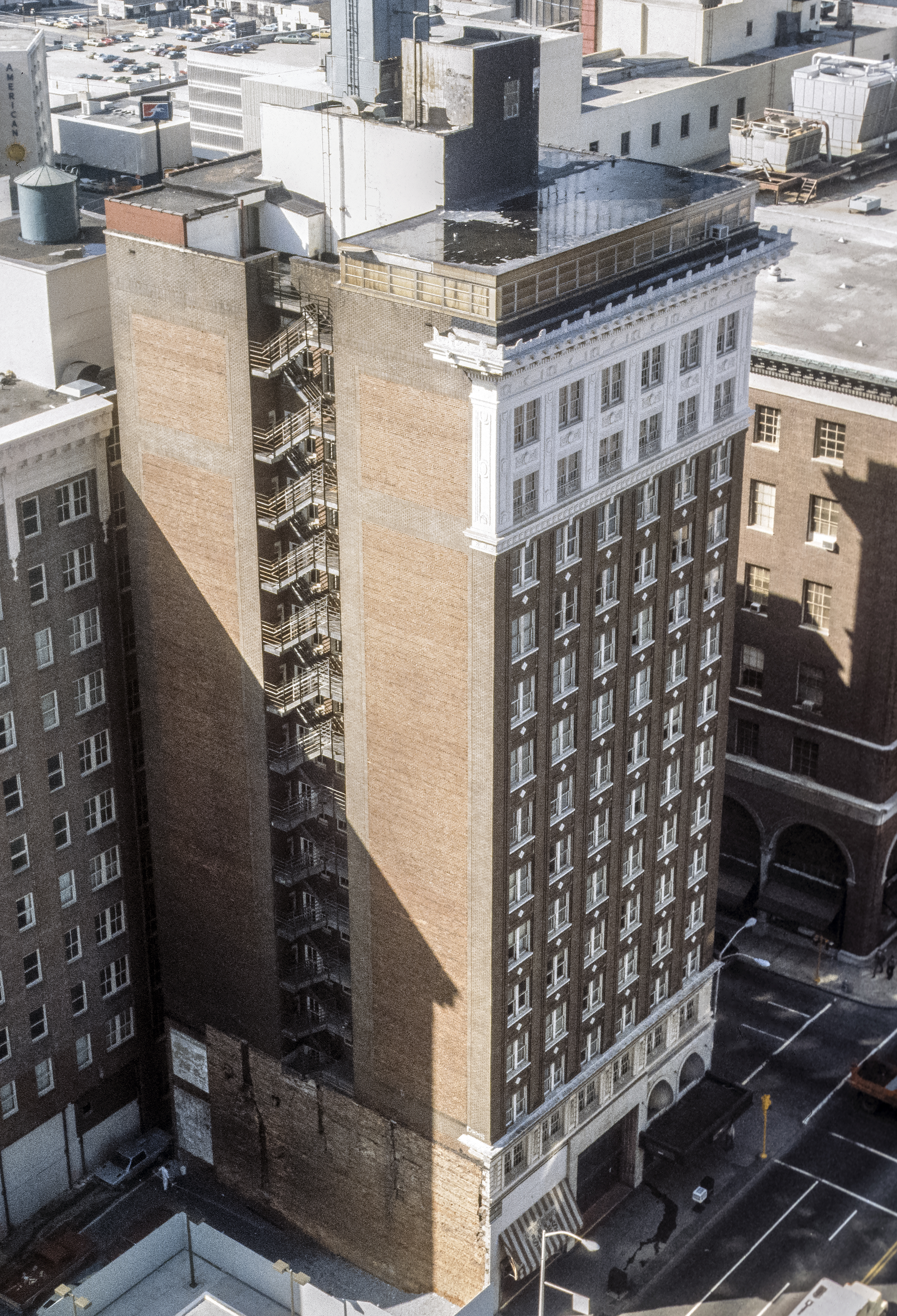
The rear of the Winecoff Hotel in 1984 with the fire escape stairway added during reconstruction after the fire

The fire's point of origin was on the third floor west hallway, where a mattress and chair had been temporarily placed in the corridor, close to the stairway to the fourth floor. One theory suggests that a dropped cigarette may have ignited the mattress or other combustibles in the corridor. The fire was first noticed about 3:15 a.m. by a bellboy who had gone to the fifth floor to help a guest and was trapped. However, the first (and only) call to the fire department was made at 3:42 a.m. by the night manager, who was reported to have attempted to warn guests by telephone of the fire. The building fire alarm was not sounded, although by that time no escape was possible from the upper floors in any case. A survivor recounted being awakened and made aware of the fire by the sound of people screaming.

The first engine and ladder companies arrived within thirty seconds of the call. By that time people were already jumping from windows. Fire department ladders could extend only part way up the building, and many guests were rescued in this manner. Other people were rescued via ladders placed horizontally across the alley to an adjoining building.

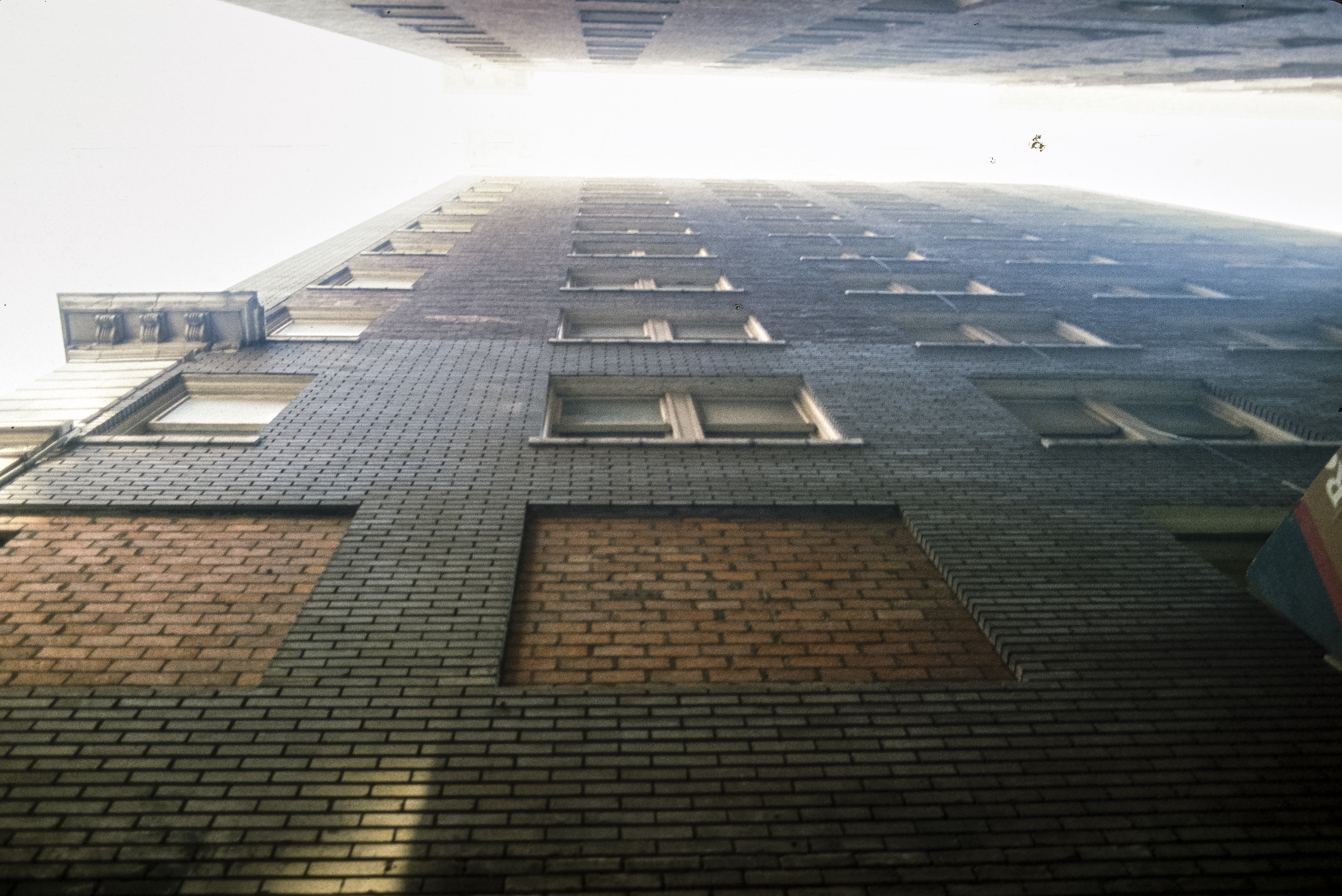
The alley between the Winecoff and the Mortgage Guaranty Building

Fire spread was initially hampered by the stair arrangement. While the stairs were not closed off by doors, the configuration placed ascending and descending runs around the corner from each other, keeping fire and hot gas from quickly ascending the stair. Fire did not spread through the enclosed elevator shafts, nor through the laundry or mail chutes. Open transoms between the rooms and the corridors admitted fresh air for combustion, eventually creating a flue-like effect with the fire climbing to all but the two top floors. Once established in the corridors, the fire fed on the burlap wallcoverings and ignited room doors and transoms. Doors and transoms were burned through on all but the fourteenth and fifteenth floors. Guests opened windows seeking fresh air and rescue, further enabling the draft of fresh air to the fire. The fire investigation revealed that an open transom was closely associated with the ignition of a given guest room and its contents.

=== Firefighters ===
Firefighters were hampered, and in some cases injured, by falling bodies. A number of guests tied bedsheets together and tried to descend. Others misjudged the ten-foot-wide alley between the rear of the Winecoff and the Mortgage Guaranty Building and attempted to jump across. The Atlanta Fire Department mustered 385 firefighters, 22 engine companies and 11 ladder trucks, four of which were aerial ladder units, at the scene. A second alarm was sounded at 3:44 a.m. and a third at 3:49 a.m., with a general alarm (all available units respond, including off-duty personnel) at 4:02 a.m. Mutual aid from surrounding departments brought a total of 49 pieces of equipment. Firefighters climbed adjoining buildings to fight the fire and rescue guests, including the 12-story Mortgage Guaranty building across the 10-foot (3.0 m) wide alley, and the six-story Davison-Paxon department store (later Macy's) on the opposite side of Ellis Street.

== Casualties ==
The hotel was especially crowded that night, for a combination of reasons. People from all over the state had traveled to Atlanta to go Christmas shopping in the city. Others had come to see the new hit Disney animated film Song of the South, which was playing across the street.

Of the 304 guests in the hotel that night, 119 died, about 65 were injured and about 120 were rescued uninjured. The hotel's original owners, the Winecoffs, who lived in an apartment in the hotel, died in the apartment. Thirty-two deaths were among those who jumped, or who fell while trying to descend ropes made of sheets tied together to reach the ground or too short fire ladders. Among the hotel guests were forty high school students on a State YMCA of Georgia ("Y" Clubs) sponsored trip to Atlanta for a state youth-in-government legislative program, thirty of whom died. The students had mostly been placed two to a room at the back of the hotel next to the alley, where many of the windows had been covered by louvered shutters for privacy. The occupants of the shuttered rooms were killed on every floor above the fifth floor.

Between $3 million and $4 million in claims (equivalent to between $43 million and $58 million today) were brought against the hotel's owners, but insurance awards totaled only about $350,000 (equivalent to $5 million today).

Among the casualties were:

- William Fleming Winecoff (age 76), the hotel's builder and namesake. He lived with his wife for 31 years in suite 1011–1012. He was found dead in a nearby hall.
- Grace Smith Winecoff (age 76), the builder's wife. She died on the sidewalk of Peachtree Street.
- Patricia Ann Griffin (age 14), daughter of Marvin Griffin and one of 40 delegates of the second Youth Assembly at the Georgia State Capitol who were staying at the Winecoff. She suffocated with another delegate and their chaperone in room 926.
- Christine Adams Hinson (age 17), daughter of Isham Lamar Hinson, Sr. and one of the 40 delegates of the second Youth Assembly at the Georgia State Capitol who were staying at the Winecoff. She was staying in room 1430.
- Ernest Benedict Weatherly (age 63), former chairman of a federally appointed committee on the beef industry. He jumped to his death from room 1024.
- Margaret Wilson Nichols (age 30). A onetime Miss Atlanta runner-up and a well-known former box-office girl at the Fox and Paramount in Atlanta, Georgia, she died falling from room 720 to the alley behind the hotel.
- Elmer Andrew Conzett (age 32), Navy Lieutenant Commander, bomber pilot in World War II
- Ashley John Burns (age 26), grandson of William J. Burns. He suffocated in room 1416.
- Borgia McCoy (age 58), mother-in-law of British vice-consul Thomas Bolton. In town to help with her grandchild, she suffocated in room 724.
- Florance Allen Baggett (age 43), a well-known auctioneer. He was staying in suite 1108–1110–1112 with his first cousins Sarah Baggett Miller (died) and Catherine Baggett McLaughlin (survived). Catherine made it down safely, Sarah fell, and Florance suffocated in the room.
- Nell Zorn Sims (age 33), president of the Business and Professional Women's Club of Barnesville, Georgia. She climbed out of room 1504, slipped from the cornice and fell 15 stories, landing on the hood of a fire truck and breaking her neck.

== Press coverage ==
Arnold Hardy, a 24-year-old Georgia Tech graduate student, won the 1947 Pulitzer Prize for Photography, capturing the fall of Daisy McCumber from the building with his last flashbulb. Hardy had been coming home from a dance. Hearing sirens, he called the fire department to find the location and went to the fire scene. Atlanta Journal photographer Jack Young, suffering from pleurisy, checked into Grady Memorial Hospital at 3:30 a.m. on December 7. When the hospital received news of the mass-casualty incident, Young dressed and left the hospital for the fire scene. AP photographers Rudy Faircloth and Horace Cort also arrived at the scene. Following the fire, Hardy appeared at the AP office with his own images, three of which were usable, one of which was of McCumber's fall. The AP bought Hardy's pictures for $300 (equivalent to about $4953 in 2025). McCumber survived her fall.

== Impact on fire codes ==
The fire, coming on the heels of the La Salle Hotel fire, had a major impact on building codes. A national conference on fire prevention was convened in 1947 at the direction of U.S. President Harry S. Truman in response to the La Salle and Winecoff fires. Both fires had highlighted the problems associated with unprotected stair openings, which provided paths for the spread of smoke (in the case of the La Salle Hotel) and fire (at the Winecoff), simultaneously preventing the use of the stairs for escape. The National Fire Protection Association's Building Exits Code of 1927 had already set forth principles requiring the use of multiple, protected means of egress, and was further revised to allow the code to be incorporated as law. Emphasis in building design and construction was changed from the protection of property—the Winecoff's "completely fireproof" statement on its stationery was accurate insofar as it was confined to the building's structure—to place primary emphasis on the protection of life, with property protection subordinated to that goal. Georgia Governor Ellis Arnall reacted to the narrowly defined "fireproof" statement, stating:

The public is being defrauded when a hotel is advertised as "fireproof," but really isn't. Responsible agencies should prohibit the use of the word "fireproof" when a hotel is not really fireproof as the Winecoff obviously was not.

Fireproof construction was a term primarily originating with the insurance industry, which was chiefly concerned with property loss claims. A "fireproof building" could withstand a severe fire and be returned to service once its interior finishes were replaced, without total loss due to collapse or damage to adjoining structures. The Building Exits Code was significantly revised in 1948 to address issues of finish combustibility, detection and warning, and provisions related to the number of people in the building. To highlight its principal emphasis, the Building Exits Code was retitled the Code for Safety to Life from Fire in 1966, which was further developed and re-titled as the Life Safety Code.

The Winecoff fire led to the incorporation of wartime research into the flammability of building materials into code requirements and design standards, recognizing the existence of flashover as a means of fire propagation. The Winecoff was cited as a notable example in which multiple flashovers served to propagate the fire at each successive level. The La Salle and Winecoff fires, in which combustible finish materials were prominent hazards, spurred the adoption of the Steiner tunnel test which had been used by Underwriters Laboratories to establish the relative fire hazard of materials as the ASTM-E84 and NFPA-255 standards from 1958. The prohibition of operable transoms in guest rooms was a direct result of the Winecoff fire.

The Winecoff fire also stimulated debate concerning the ex post facto enforcement of new fire code requirements in older properties. Until the rash of hotel fires in 1946, such legislation was regarded as an unconstitutional taking of property. Newer legislation enabled the enforcement of standards for existing buildings in addition to new construction.

== Memorials ==
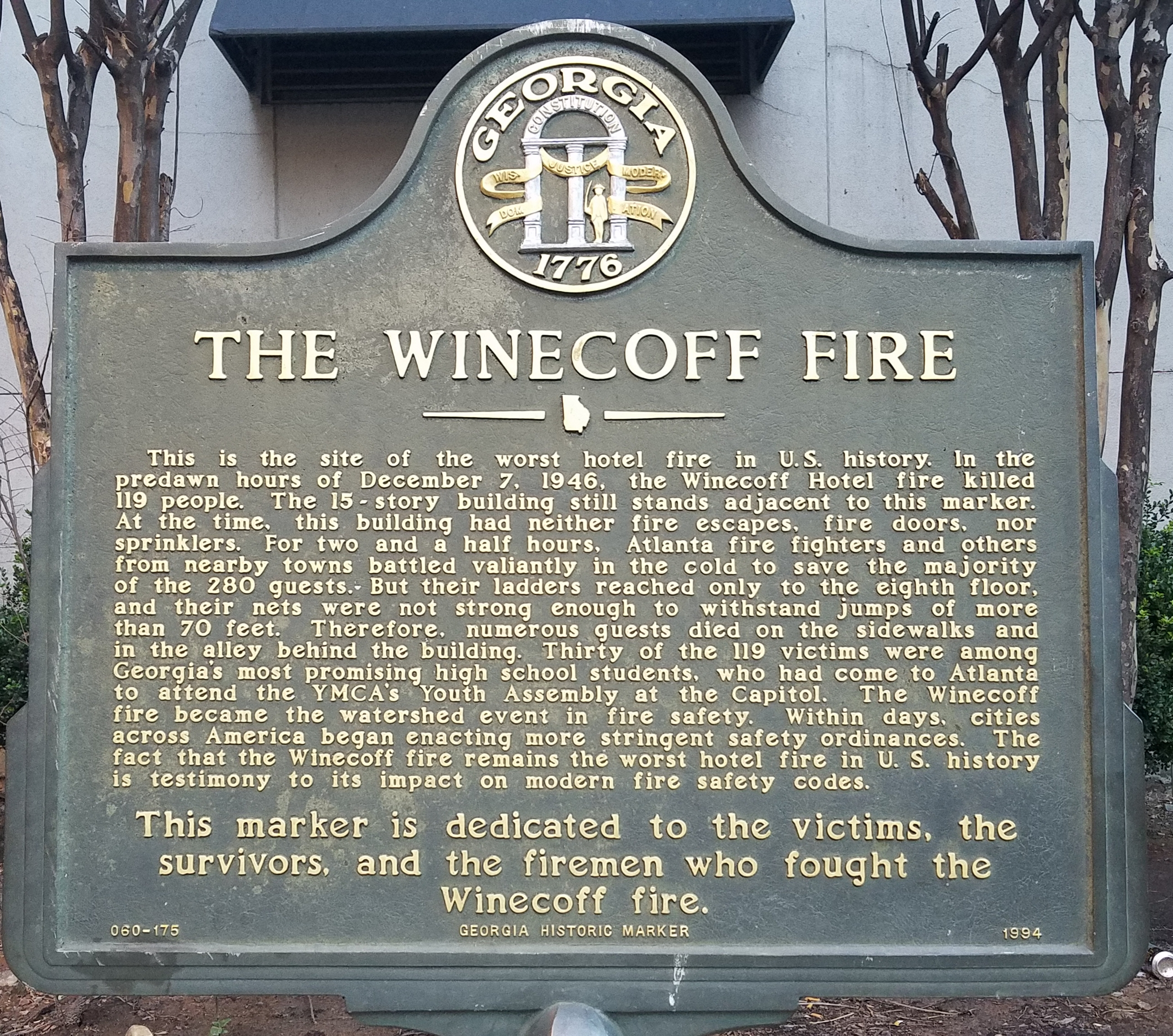
Georgia Historical Marker for the Winecoff Fire

Family and friends of victims and survivors gathered in Sandy Springs for the 70th anniversary of the fire and to remember the victims.

South of the hotel stands a historical marker that commemorates the victims, survivors and the fire. It reads "dedicated to the victims, the survivors, and the firemen who fought the Winecoff fire."

There is also a memorial at the Millenium Gate Museum in Atlantic Station in the lawn.

== See also ==
- Life Safety Code
- MGM Grand fire

== Bibliography ==
- Hensler, Bruce (2011). Crucible of Fire: Nineteenth Century Urban Fires and the Making of the Modern Fire Service. Potomac Books. p. 144. ISBN 978-1-59797-684-8.
- Maines, Rachel (2005). Asbestos and Fire: Technological Trade-offs and the Body at Risk. Rutgers University Press. pp. 114–115. ISBN 0-8135-3575-1.
- McElroy, James K. (January 1947). "The Hotel Winecoff Disaster" (PDF). Quarterly of the National Fire Protection Association. 40 (3): 140–145. Archived from the original (PDF) on August 11, 2020.
