= Ellis Hotel =

Historic hotel in downtown Atlanta, Georgia, United States

The Ellis Hotel
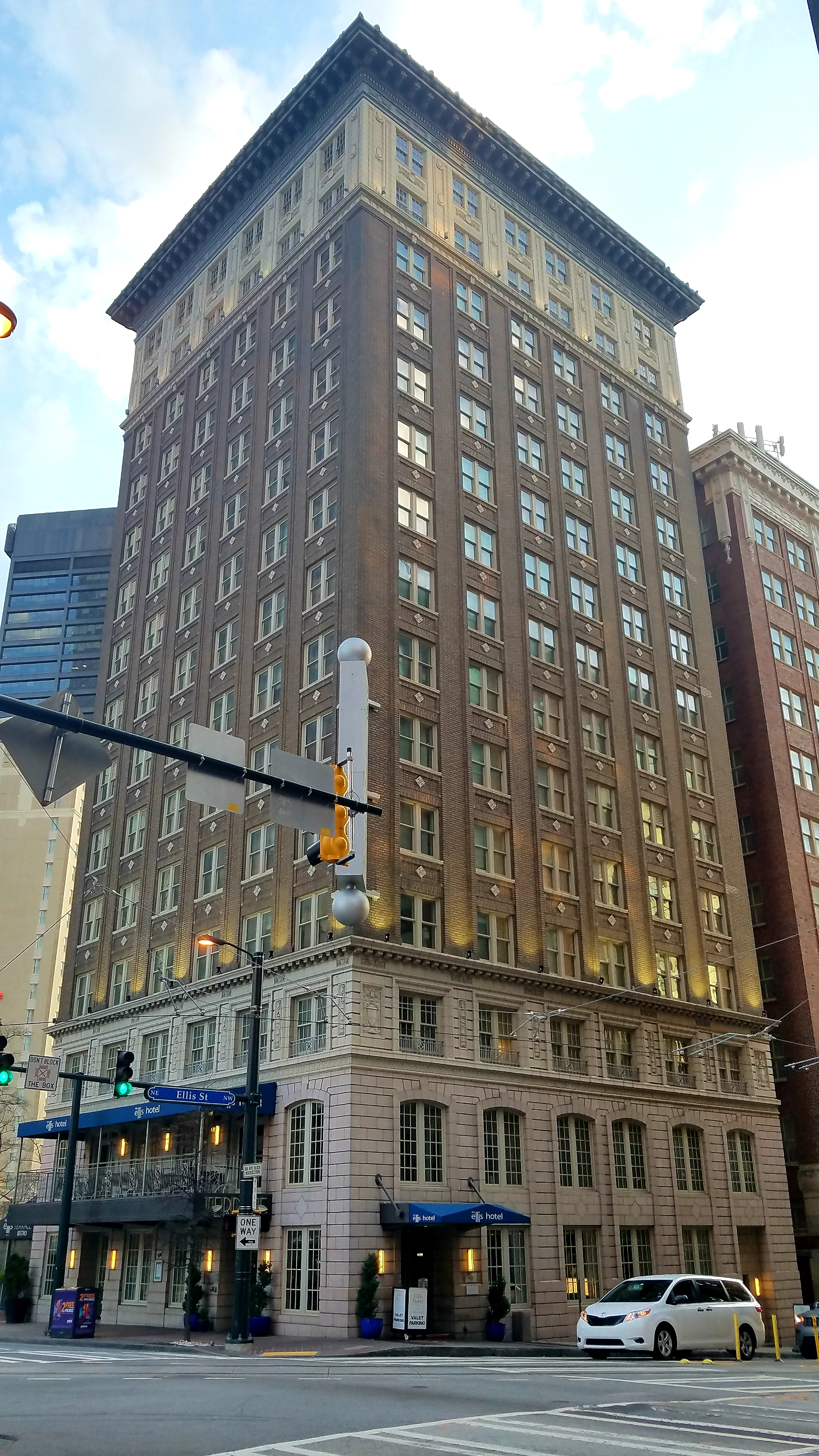
- Ellis Hotel in 2020
- Interactive map of the The Ellis Hotel area

General information
- Location: 176 Peachtree Street NW, Atlanta
- Opening: 1913
- Operator: Colwen Hotels

Technical details
- Floor count: 15

Design and construction
- Architect: William Lee Stoddart

Other information
- Number of rooms: 127

Website
- Ellis Hotel
- The Ellis Hotel
- U.S. National Register of Historic Places
- Location within Atlanta
- Coordinates: 33.7583°N 84.3878°W
- NRHP reference No.: 09000185
- Added to NRHP: March 31, 2009

The Ellis Hotel, formerly known as the Winecoff Hotel, is located at 176 Peachtree Street NW, in downtown Atlanta, Georgia, US. Designed by William Lee Stoddart, the 15-story building opened in 1913. It is located next to 200 Peachtree, which was built as the flagship Davison's. It was listed on the National Register of Historic Places on March 31, 2009 and inducted into Historic Hotels of America in 2023. The Ellis Hotel is best known for a fire that occurred there on December 7, 1946, in which 119 people died.

== Fire ==
The Ellis Hotel (previously the Winecoff Hotel) is best known for a fire that occurred there on December 7, 1946, in which 119 people died. It remains the deadliest hotel fire in U.S. history, and prompted many changes in building codes. Guests at the hotel that night included teenagers attending a Hi-Y and Tri-Hi-Y Youth-in-Government conference (Youth Assembly) sponsored by the State YMCA of Georgia, Christmas shoppers, and people in town to see Song of the South. Arnold Hardy, a 24-year-old graduate student at Georgia Tech, became the first amateur to win a Pulitzer Prize in photography for his snapshot of a woman in mid-air after jumping from the 11th floor of the hotel during the fire. The jumper was Daisy McCumber, 41. She sustained multiple broken bones and eventually had a leg amputated. Under these circumstances, she still worked until her retirement. She died in 1992.

== Reopenings ==
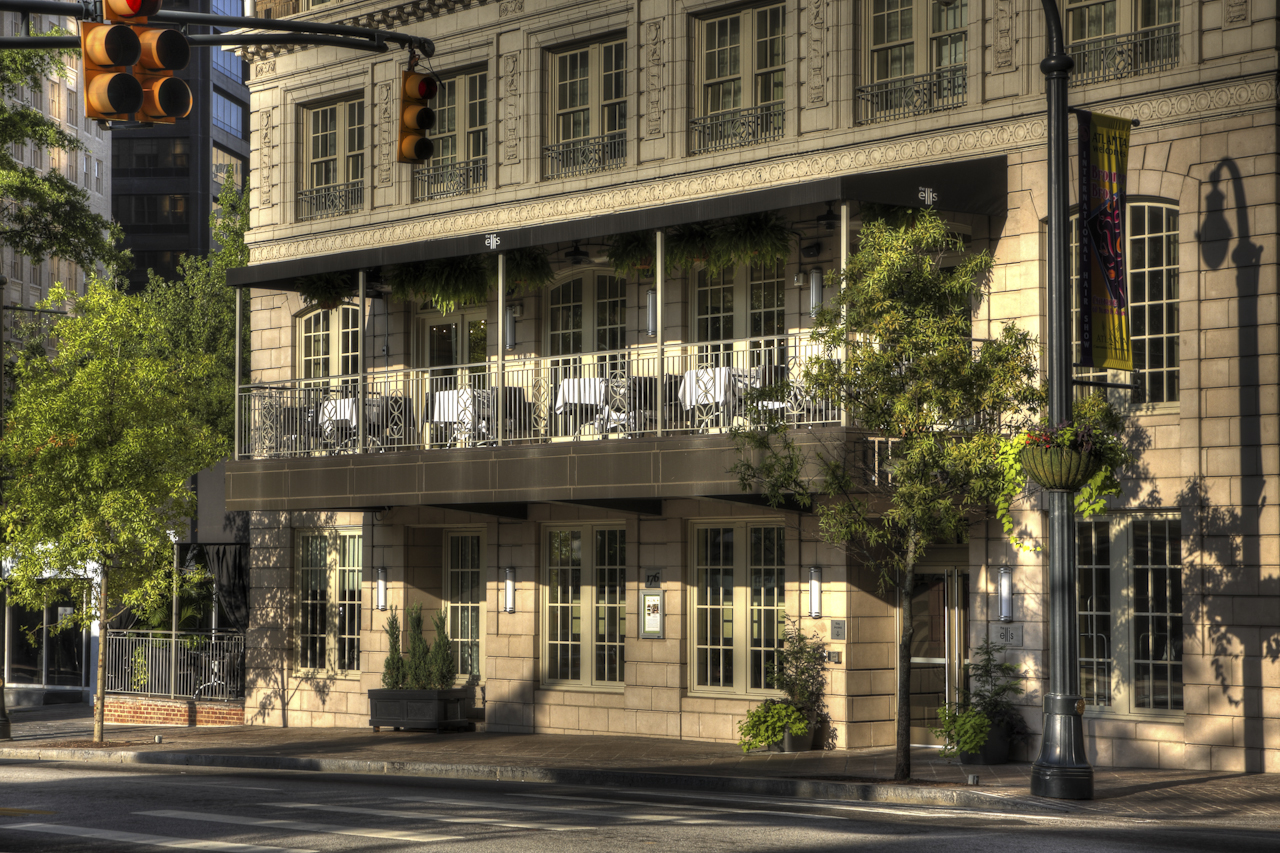
Ellis Hotel

In April 1951, the hotel reopened as the Peachtree Hotel on Peachtree, and was now equipped with both fire alarms and automated sprinkler systems. In 1967, it was donated to the Georgia Baptist Convention for housing the elderly, and then repeatedly sold to a series of potential developers.

The gutted lobby served as a souvenir shop during the 1996 Summer Olympics.

After over two decades of vacancy, a $23 million renovation project began in April 2006. The project restored the building into a boutique luxury hotel, called the Ellis Hotel after the street that runs along the north side of the building. It was reopened on October 1, 2007.

== See also ==
- National Register of Historic Places listings in Fulton County, Georgia
- Hotels in Atlanta
- History of hotel fires in the United States
- Skyscraper fire
