= Opera in Atlanta =

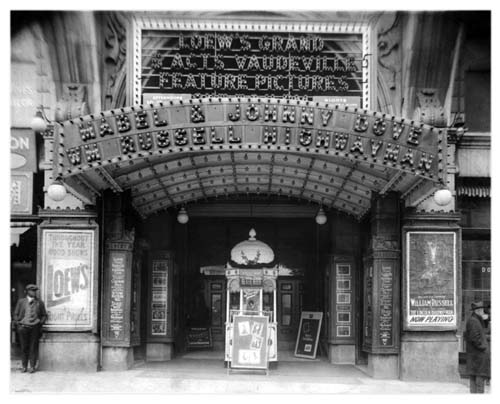
Loew's Grand Theater, originally DeGive's Opera House

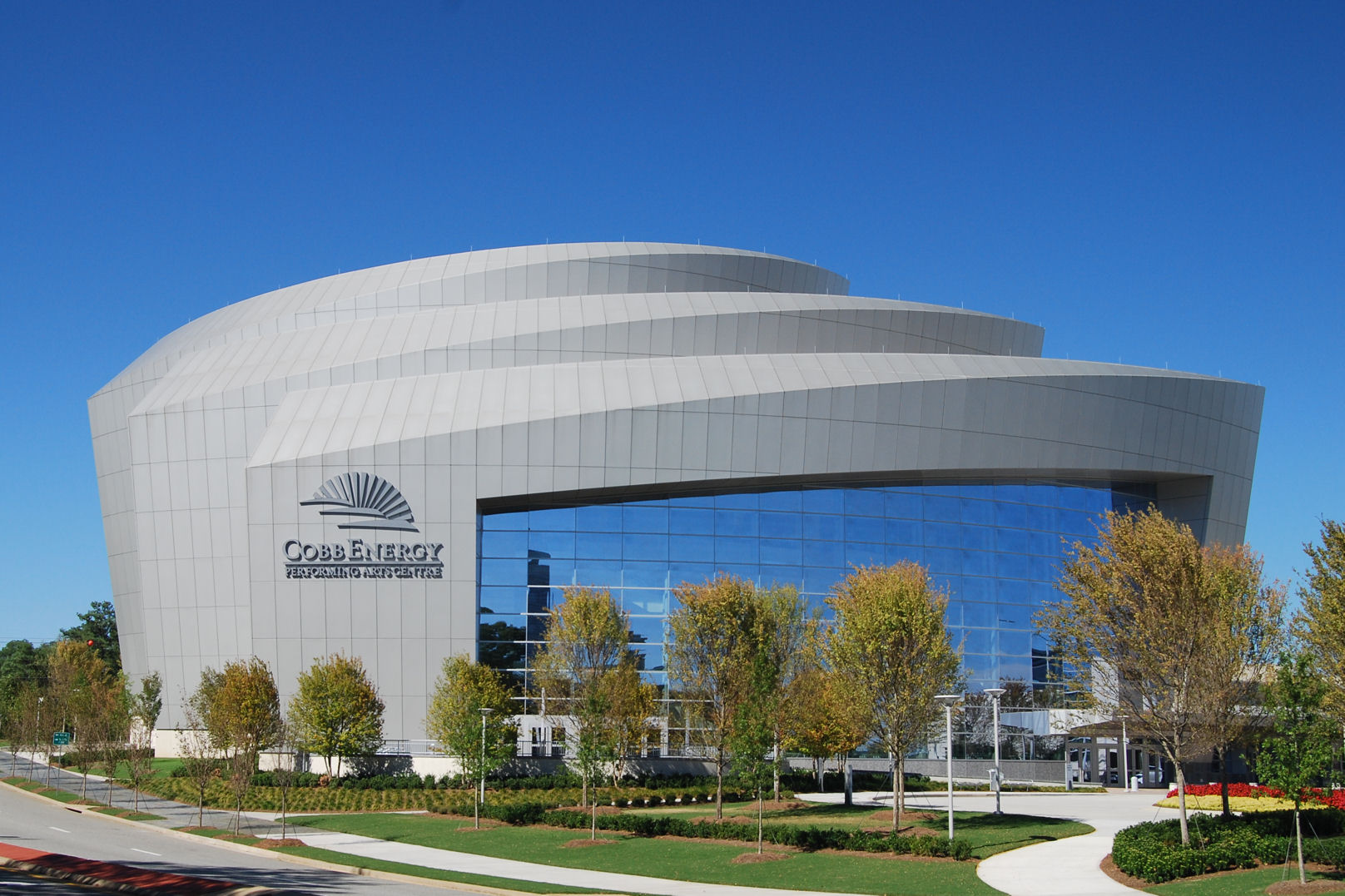
The Cobb Energy Performing Arts Centre: the performance home of The Atlanta Opera

Opera in Atlanta has a long and uneven history. The first shows performed in Atlanta predate the American Civil War and were primarily performed in makeshift facilities modified for the operatic arts. The main company for the region is the Atlanta Opera, founded in 1979, which produces mainstage opera productions and arts education programs for all ages. The Atlanta Opera is based at the Cobb Energy Performing Arts Centre.

== History ==
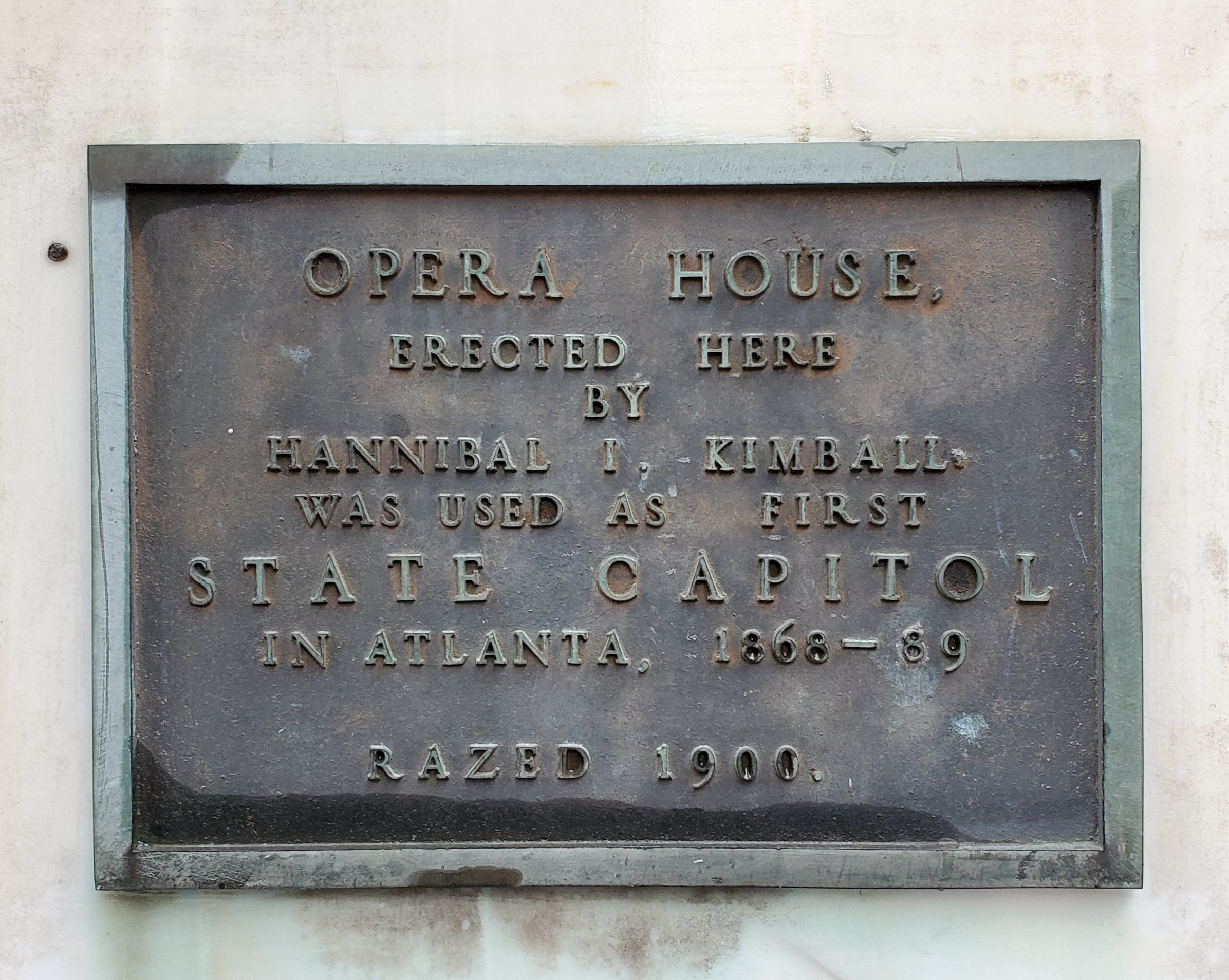
Plaque for the Kimball Opera House

The first shows performed in Atlanta predate the American Civil War and were primarily performed in makeshift facilities modified for the operatic arts. Reconstruction saw the formation of the Atlanta Opera House and Building Association. The association obtained the southwest corner of Marietta Street and Forsyth Street to construct a five-story opera house. By 1868, they were out of money. Instead of hosting great performances, Atlanta's first opera house, the Kimball Opera House as it was later known, was sold at a loss. It served as Georgia's state capitol from January 1869 to July 1889.

In 1870, Laurent DeGive, Atlanta's Belgian consul, built DeGive's Opera House on Marietta Street. The cheap seats were 25 cents. Laurent deGive struggled with presenting touring companies because of the inflated cost of train travel through the incompletely reconstructed South. In 1893 DeGive built a second and larger theater, DeGive's Grand Opera House, at 157 Peachtree Street, which in 1916 was leased to the Loew family. Later renamed Loew's Grand Theatre, it subsequently became famous for the 1939 premiere of the movie, Gone with the Wind. Margaret Mitchell, the author of the story was an Atlanta native.

By 1910, the Metropolitan Opera began touring through Atlanta and the South began a 76-year love affair with its Yankee brethren. The summer Met tours became an annual week-long event that drew many of Dixie's wealthiest citizens and even more socialites. It was so popular that it began to attract an international celebrity crowd. It is reported that during Atlanta's golden age of opera, the majority of the social elite would attend the first act and then leave at intermission for drinks and an evening of party-going. It was better to be seen than to hear. Eager young students would often crowd outside the theater in hopes of gaining partially used tickets and catch the remainder of the show. As the yearly event outgrew all of Atlanta's existing theaters - even the Fabulous Fox, city aristocrats lobbied and construction began on the Atlanta Civic Center. The yearly Met shows thrived there until the Met disbanded its touring program in 1986.

Various local Atlanta artists attempted to create a company solely for Atlanta. There was even an ill-fated push to spark the interest of legendary chorister and conductor Robert Shaw to head a regional company. Some of the companies that were founded and have since vanished are the Atlanta Chamber Opera (1960s), Opera Atlanta (late 1960s), Georgia Opera (1970s), Atlanta Lyric Opera (1976), Atlanta Civic Opera (1979), and Opera Onyx (1980s). The Atlanta Opera which continues as the area's premiere opera troupe, was founded in 1979.

The 1990s saw the addition of the regional companies Americolor Opera Alliance and Capitol City Opera. Additional companies were founded in 2006 and 2007 including OperaSouth, The New Opera and Peachtree Modern Opera.
