= Westview Cemetery =

Cemetery in Fulton County, Georgia, US

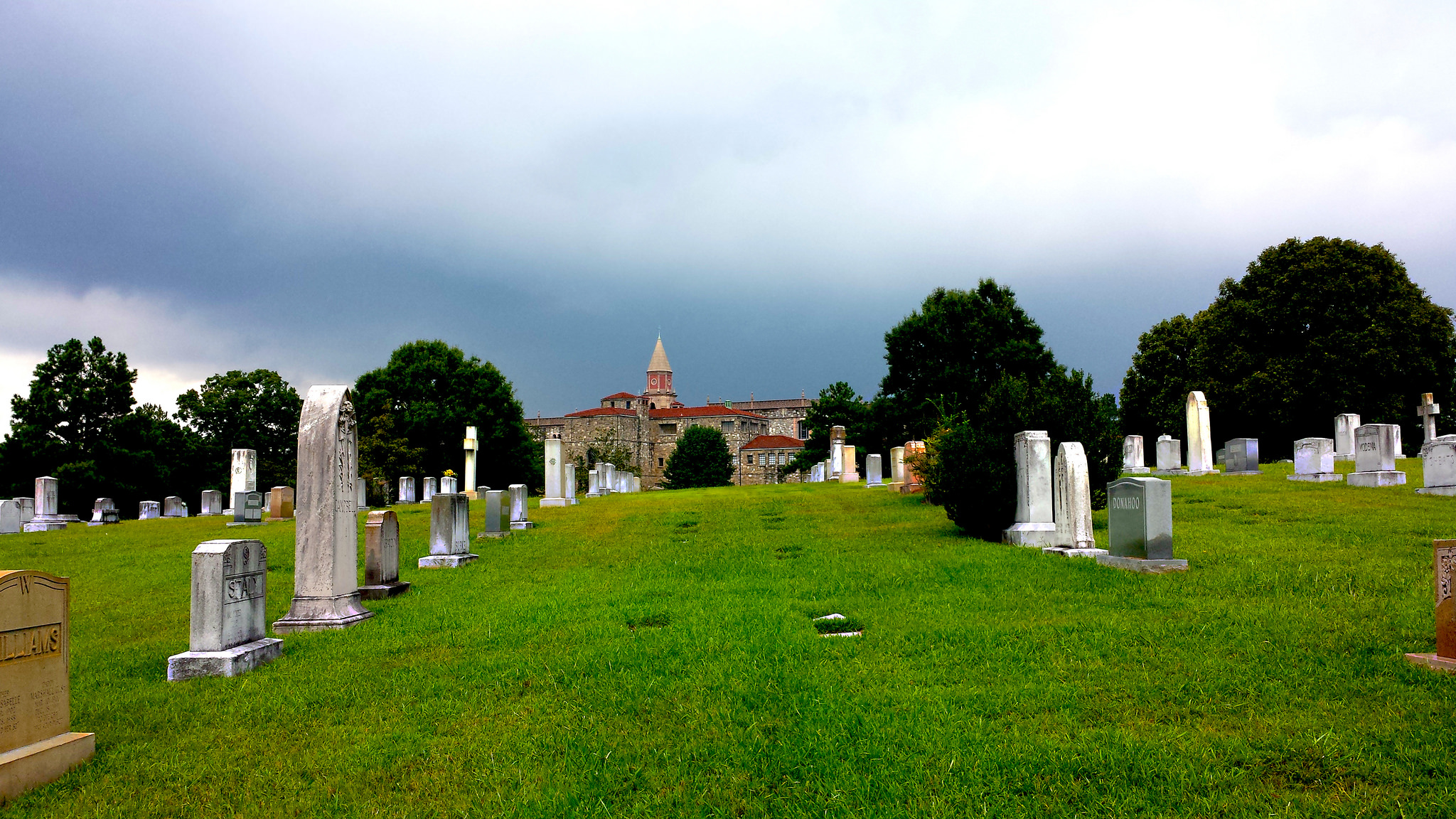
- Westview Cemetery Abbey in distance
- Interactive map of Westview Cemetery

Details
- Established: October of 1884
- Location: 1680 Westview Drive, SW, Atlanta, Georgia, U.S.
- Coordinates: 33.746162°N 84.443142°W
- Type: Non-profit
- Size: 582 acres (2.36 km^{2})
- No. of graves: 125,000+
- Website: westviewcemetery.com
- Find a Grave: Westview Cemetery

Westview Cemetery, located in Atlanta, Georgia, is the largest civilian cemetery in the Southeastern United States, comprising more than 582 acres (2.36 km^{2}), 50 percent of which is undeveloped. The cemetery includes the graves of more than 125,000 people and was added to the Georgia Register of Historic Places in 2019 and the National Register of Historic Places in 2020.

== History ==
=== McBurney era (1884–1930) ===
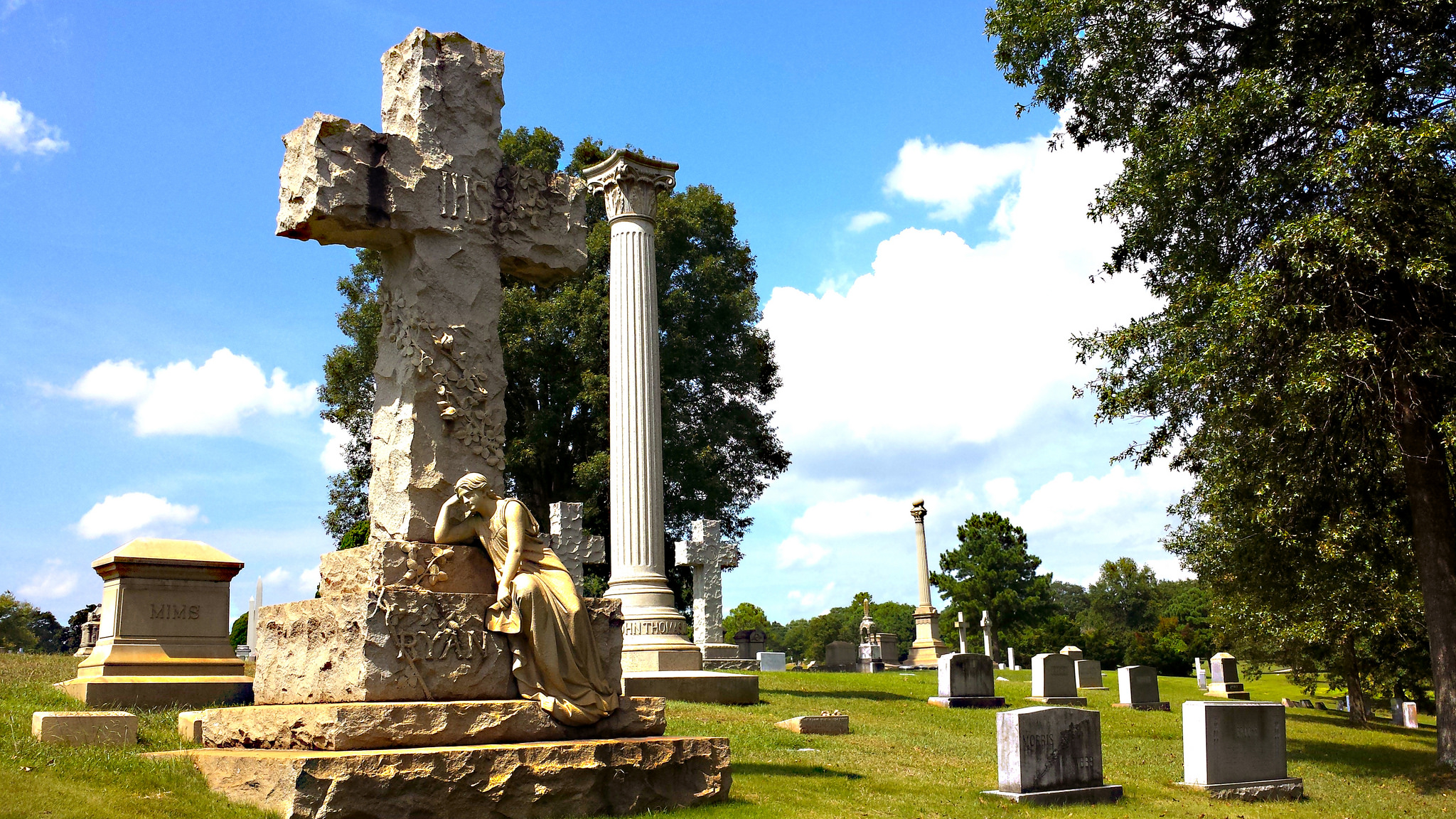
View of grave stones in cemetery

In May 1884, twenty-seven leading Atlanta citizens, including L.P. Grant, Edward P. McBurney, Jacob Elsas, H.I. Kimball and L. DeGive, petitioned the Superior Court of Fulton County to create the West View Cemetery Association. The association was to be led by secretary and general manager McBurney, who was a capitalist and financier in Atlanta. The petition was granted in June, and during the rest of the year members of the Association gathered approximately 577 acres of farms, homesteads, and undeveloped land, around four miles west of downtown Atlanta, from more than a handful of owners.

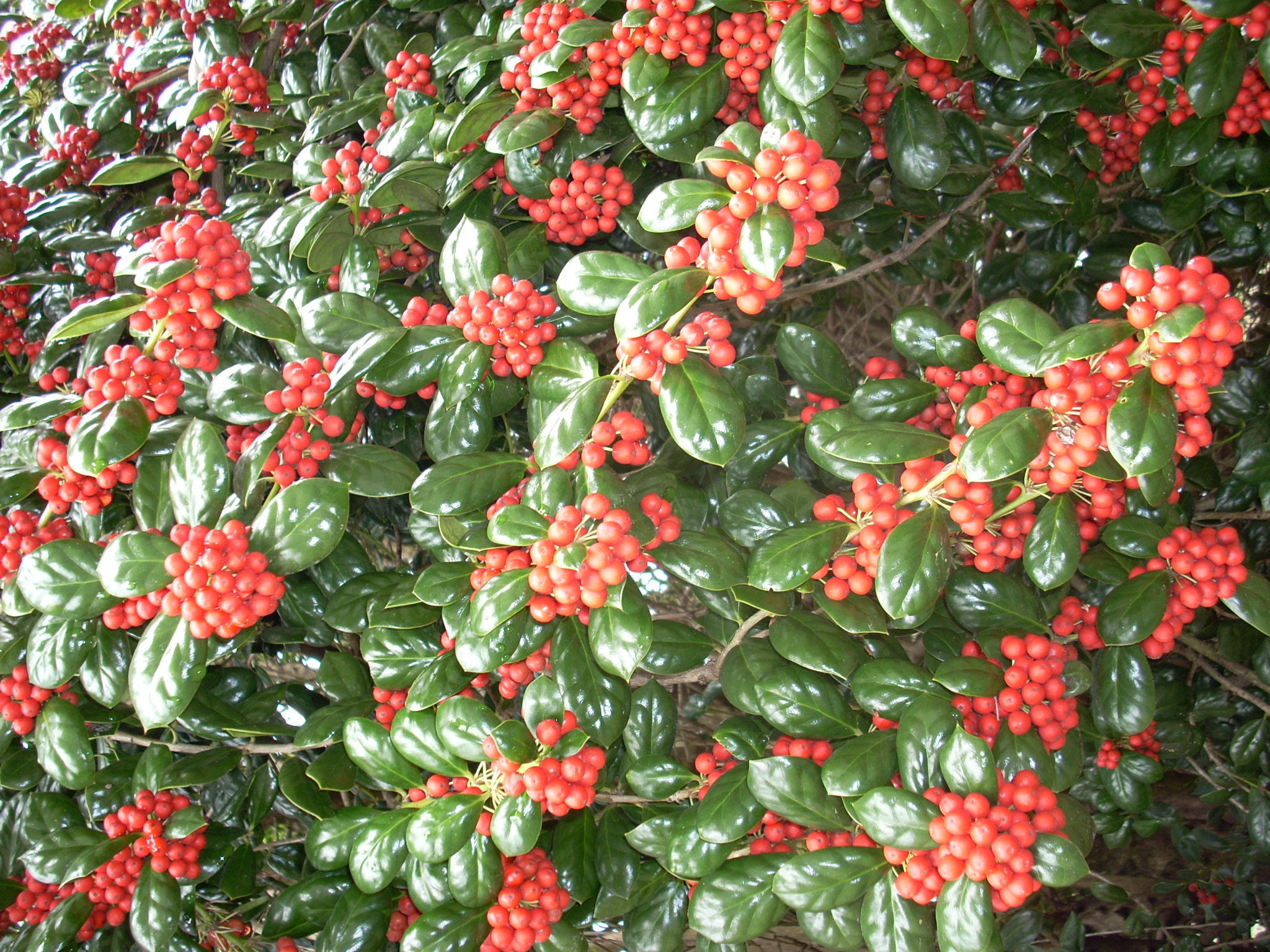
View of Burford Holly.

The cemetery buried its first resident – Helen Livingston Haskins – on October 9, 1884. By this time, the cemetery had opened three distinct sections: the main burial sections, originally known as Laurel Hill, Terrace Hill, etc.; Rest Haven, an African-American section; and God’s Acre, a pauper section used by the City of Atlanta until 1925. In 1888, West View Cemetery opened a permanent receiving vault that was built into the side of a hill in Section 4. It would serve as a temporary storage space for bodies until families could pick out a suitable burial plot or, in winter, store a body until the cemetery grounds were thawed and traversable by horse-drawn carriages.

In 1889, a Confederate sculpture was erected, and a burial ground was established within West View to commemorate the Confederate dead of the American Civil War. The statue and burial ground completion ended years of failed attempts to memorialize the war, specifically the Battle of Ezra Church, part of which had taken place on the northern boundaries of the cemetery. In the same year, cemetery officials had discussions with a Jewish congregation about opening a dedicated Jewish burial ground within the cemetery: ultimately the congregations purchased new sections from Oakland Cemetery in downtown Atlanta instead. The Romanesque Revival gatehouse opened the following year. It was designed by architect Walter T. Downing and contained a waiting room, toilets, and a secretary’s office.

The Westview Floral Company, incorporated in 1891, grew flowers at greenhouses on the cemetery property for sale to lot holders and to the public. It also carried out contracted landscape gardening for wealthy Atlantans – be it at their homes or businesses. The Company became the largest greenhouse operator in the south until it was closed. All its structures were removed from the cemetery by 1973. The only two items from the greenhouses that still exist are the 110-foot-high water tower, built in 1921, and a plant that was discovered circa 1895 on the property by then head gardener Thomas Burford – the Ilex cornuta “Burfordii,” or Burford holly. It is now sold the world over as a landscape shrub.

=== Adair leadership (1930–1933) ===
In August 1930 the West View Cemetery Association announced to the public that E.P. McBurney would no longer run the cemetery; it would instead be headed by Atlanta real-estate mogul Frank Adair, with his brother, Forrest, acting as vice president. Coca-Cola scion Asa Candler Jr. would serve as the association's board president and help guide the cemetery behind the scenes. However, three years later, the Great Depression was in full swing and affected the Adair brothers’ hold on West View. As such, in June 1933, the Adairs relinquished control of West View, and Candler took full control of the cemetery.

=== Candler era (1930–1952) ===
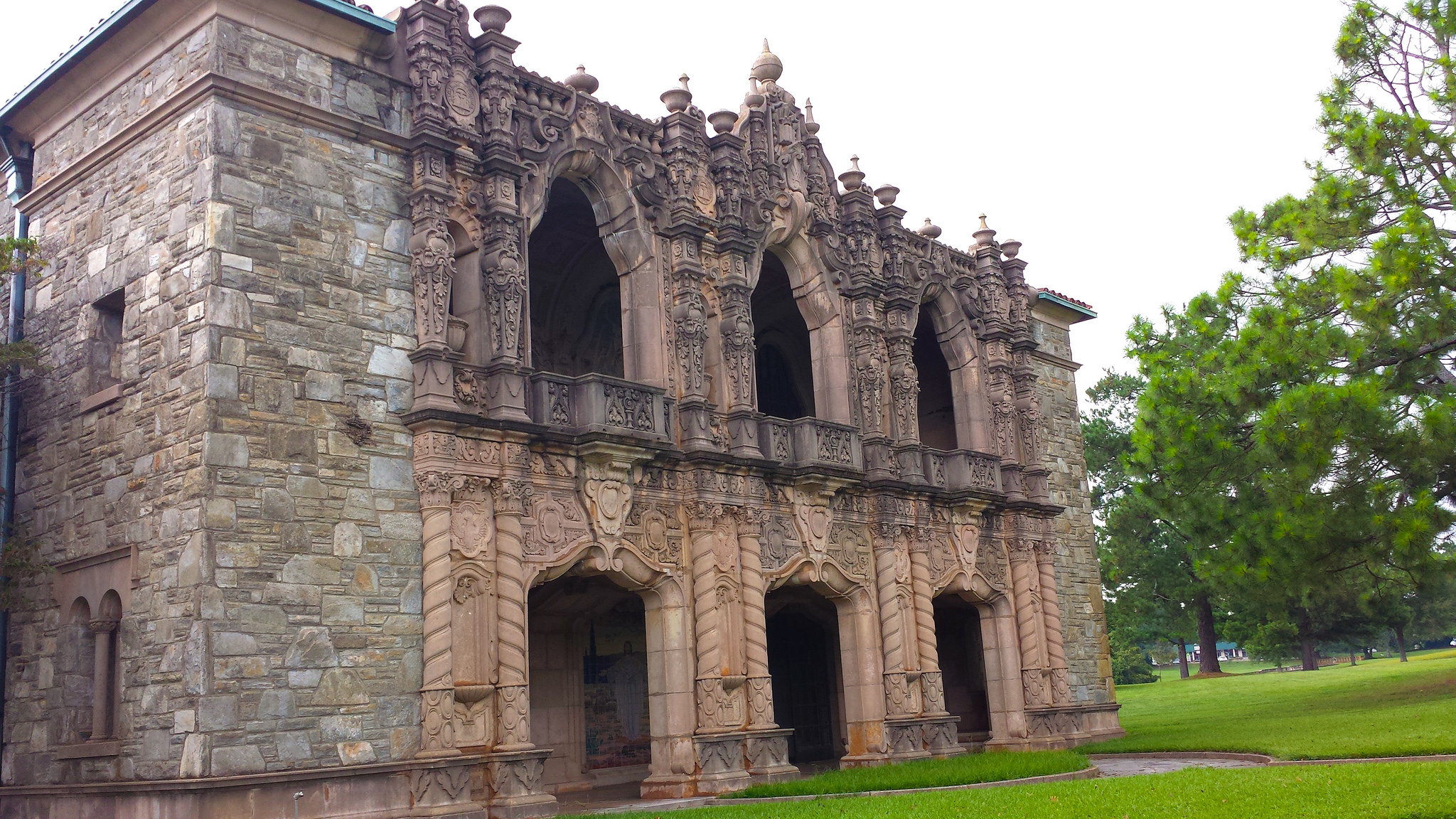
Front façade of Westview Abbey

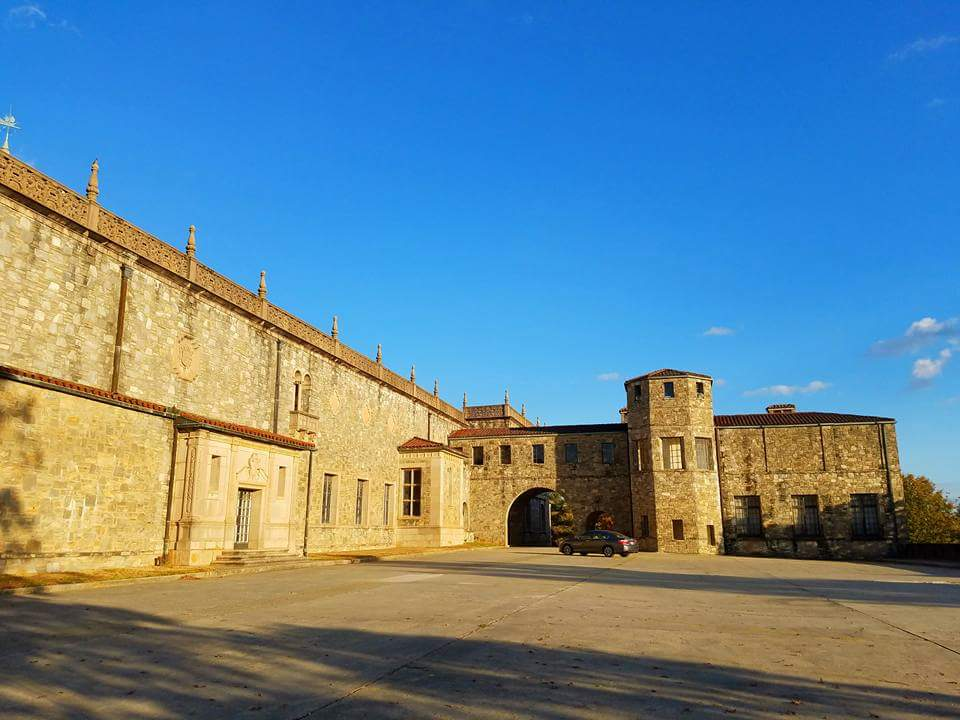
Westview Abbey's south side.

Between 1940 and 1950 Candler constructed his version of Hubert L. Eaton’s memorial park at West View, the Garden of Memories. In 1943, construction started on Westview Abbey. Designed by California-based architect Clarence Lee Jay and mausoleum builder Cecil E. Bryan, the abbey contains 11,444 crypts and is designed in the Spanish Plateresque architectural style. The structure is composed of a mausoleum and an administration building. The mausoleum's lower and main floors are complete, but much of the third floor has yet to be built out.

Lake Palmyra was completed just southwest of the abbey in 1947. Named after Palmyra, the biblical “city of palms” in Syria, Lake Palmyra had at one time a stone pier and, along one of its shores, one of four known versions of Harriet Hosmer's Zenobia in Chains, which had been purchased by Asa Candler in 1943. The lake was drained in the 1970s because of maintenance issues and Zenobia was removed from the grounds.

Between 1947 and 1948 Candler built an administration building that partly wrapped around the greenhouse's 1921 water tower. It contained offices, a reception room, a cafeteria and restrooms. It also contained Asa Candler Jr.’s trophy room, billed as one of the largest private trophy rooms in North America, which showcased trophies from Candler’s hunts in Alaska, Africa and elsewhere. The structure was demolished in 1973 and many of the animal specimens were donated to the Fernbank Museum of Natural History.

Candler unveiled the Fountain of Life Memorial in 1950. The memorial consisted of a fountain and a bas-relief depiction of the Last Supper sculpted by Fritz Paul Zimmer. The sculpture still exists, but the fountain was removed a few decades later.

=== West View becomes Westview ===
Due to advancing age and mounting legal issues, Candler sold West View to Lou O. Minear, Chester J. Sparks and Grover A. Godfrey Jr. in 1951. It was at that time that “West View” became “Westview.” The new owners sold the cemetery to Frank C. Bowen and Raymond B. Nelson in 1952. That year, Westview Cemetery, Inc. was liquidated and all its assets were transferred to The Westview Cemetery, Inc., which became a nonprofit.

=== Bowen era (1952–present) ===
Throughout the mid-1950s and into the 1960s, Bowen added eight new memorial park-style sections, such as Garden of Devotion, Garden of the Savior, etc.

In 1970, the cemetery, under Bowen’s guidance, officially ended segregation within the main grounds of the property. Additionally, during that decade, there were talks of finishing out the third floor of Westview Abbey. A small portion was completed, but three-fourths remain to be finished.

In 1975, Westview staff moved into a new administration building designed by Henry Howard Smith, the son of famed Atlanta architect Francis Palmer Smith. The new building sits near the old 1890 gatehouse along Ralph David Abernathy Boulevard. A year prior to the move, Frank Bowen had ceded operations of the cemetery to his son, Charles Bowen Sr.

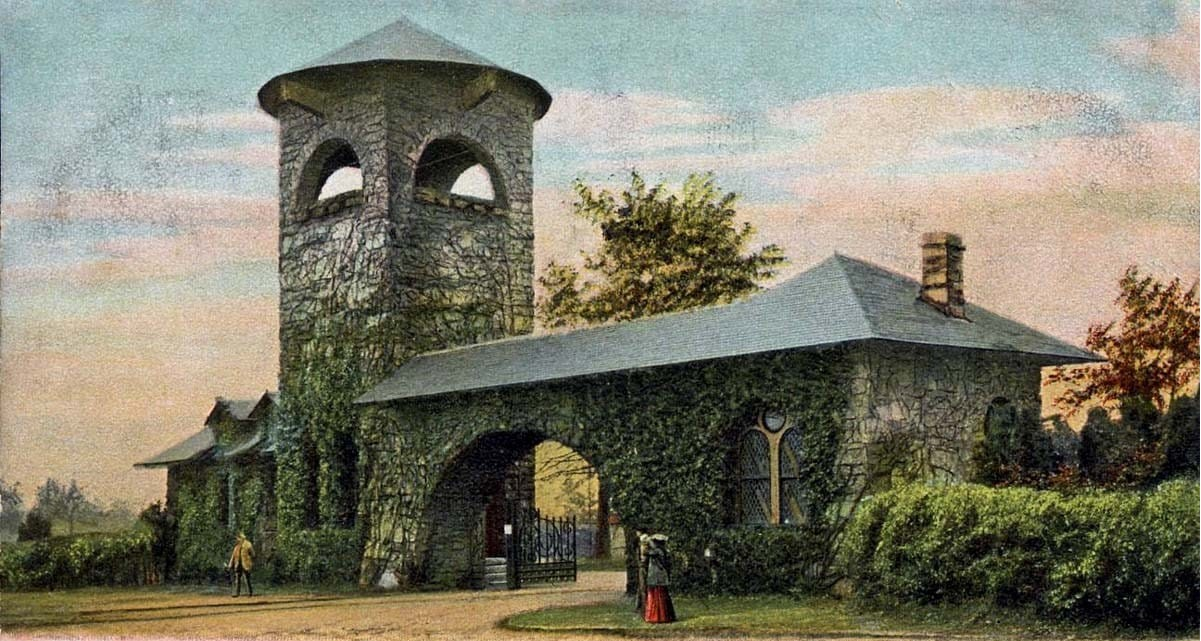
1907 postcard of Westview's 1890 gatehouse

During the 1980s, 1990s and early 2000s, Bowen Sr. and Westview opened a couple of columbaria and expanded the maintenance structures. After nearly forty years Bowen Sr. relinquished control of the cemetery to his son, Charles Bowen Jr, in 2014. Later that year, the cemetery celebrated its 130th anniversary and welcomed the publication of John Bayne’s book Atlanta’s Westview Cemetery.

The following year, Westview Cemetery opened its grounds for regularly scheduled walking tours conducted by Atlanta Preservation Center tour guides. Because of the cemetery’s size, two tours were developed – the Nineteenth-Century Tour and the Candler-Era Tour.

A year later, Westview officials created the Friends of Historic Westview Cemetery, which plans the rehabilitation of Westview’s 1890 gatehouse – offering public restrooms, a museum and gift shop.

In 2018, Jeff Clemmons’s Atlanta’s Historic Westview Cemetery was published. With the support of the Atlanta Preservation Center, Clemmons got the cemetery added to the Georgia Register of Historic Places (2019) and the National Register of Historic Places (2020).

Westview Cemetery remains an active cemetery with up to eight burials a day. It has become popular with Hollywood: filmmakers are at the cemetery throughout the year, filming features and television shows.

== Structures ==
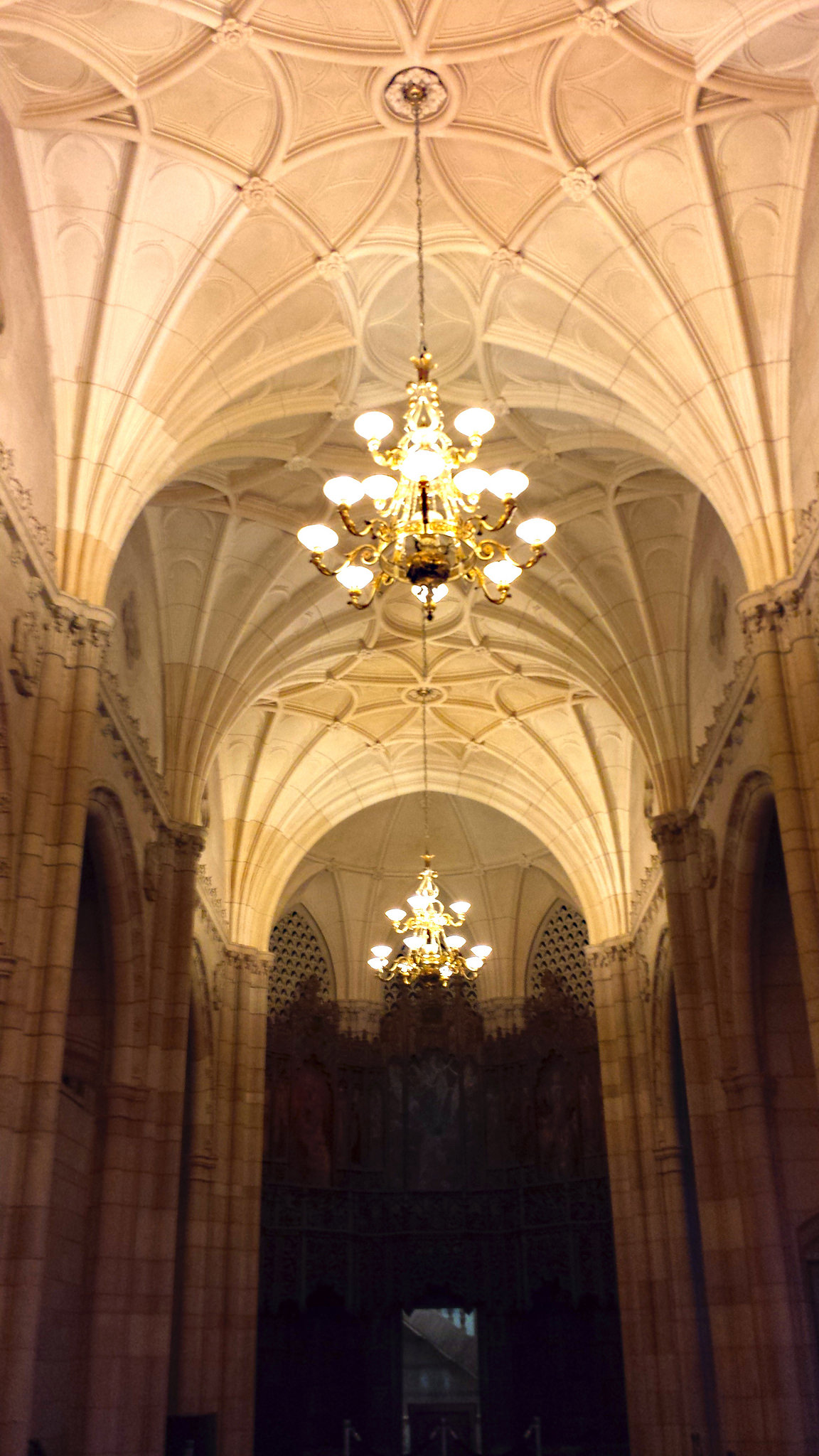
Interior of Florence Candler Chapel, Westview Cemetery

- Westview Abbey – a mausoleum and chapel, was built in 1943 and houses 11,444 entombments and space to hold cremated remains. Twenty-seven stained glass panels adorn the Spanish Gothic-style chapel and depict Jesus Christ's life from nativity through crucifixion and resurrection. A mural entitled Faith, Hope and Charity and several other paintings by Bartholomew Mako also adorn the space. More than 72 stained glass windows appear throughout the entire mausoleum.
- The Receiving Tomb – was built in 1888 and once held bodies waiting to be processed and buried. Wagons, and in later years vehicles, carrying the deceased could not get down the muddy cemetery roads during heavy rains. The marble and brick receiving tomb was also used to house bodies during the Spanish influenza outbreak in 1918.
- The Water Tower – was built in 1921 and may be mistaken for a battlefield look-out point but was only used to hold water. The top of the tower is an example of a crenellated adornment, making it look more like a castle than the roof of a water tower.
- The Confederate Memorial – was erected in 1889 by The Confederate Veterans Association of Fulton County to honor its fallen soldiers. The monument features a stone soldier standing on top of small cannonballs. Two Cohorn mortars lie just beyond a circle of Confederate graves and mark a path leading to the historic monument.

== Notable interments ==
- The entire Adair clan
- Mary Osburn Adkinson (1843–1918), social reformer
- Tina McElroy Ansa, novelist, filmmaker, teacher, businesswoman and journalist
- Jim Bagby Sr., the first pitcher to hit a home run in a modern World Series
- Bob Barrett, Major League Baseball player in the 1920s and 1930s.
- Russell L. Beutell, architect of the Buckhead Theatre, among other buildings
- John S. Bigby, U.S. Representative from Georgia
- Marion L. Brittain, president of the Georgia Institute of Technology from 1922 to 1944
- Charles M. Brown, politician and namesake of Charlie Brown Field
- William Butt, eighth mayor of Atlanta (1854–1855)
- Asa Candler, businessman, owner of Coca-Cola
- Asa G. Candler Jr., son of Asa Candler Sr., former owner of the cemetery and builder of the Westview Cemetery Abbey and Chapel.
- Walter T. Candler, son of Asa Candler Sr., banker, businessman, race horse owner, and breeder
- Herman Cain, politician.
- John S. Cohen, U.S. Senator from Georgia
- Laurent DeGive, Belgian diplomat and entrepreneur who built Loew's Grand Theatre
- Willis F. Denny, architect of Rhodes Hall and St. Mark United Methodist Church
- Dolla, rapper
- John Owen Donaldson, World War I flying ace, for whom Donaldson Air Force Base was named.
- Hugh M. Dorsey, Governor of Georgia from 1917 to 1921.
- Edward Emmett Dougherty, architect of Druid Hills Baptist Church and the Imperial Hotel
- Walter T. Downing, architect of Healey Building and Westview's 1890 gatehouse
- Henrietta Stanley Dull, newspaper columnist and cookbook author
- John J. Eagan (ACIPCO), industrialist
- James Douglas Edgar, golfer, winner of the Canadian Open
- Marion Fairbanks, stage and silent screen actress
- Vernon Forrest, professional boxer who was a four-time, two-weight world champion
- Y. Frank Freeman, executive for Paramount Pictures, winner of two Oscars
- Frank Gordy, founder of The Varsity
- Henry W. Grady, journalist and orator, namesake of Grady Memorial Hospital and Henry W. Grady High School
- L.P. Grant, for whom Grant Park is named, was on the original board of Westview
- Samuel Green, a Grand Wizard of the Knights of the Ku Klux Klan in the late 1940s
- John R. Gunn, minister, columnist and author
- Lyman Hall, president of Georgia School of Technology from 1896 to 1905
- Gladys Hanson, stage and screen actress
- Joel Chandler Harris, newspaperman and author of "Uncle Remus"
- William Berry Hartsfield, Mayor of Atlanta (1937-1941 and 1942-1962) and namesake of the Atlanta Airport
- Ernest Hartsock, poet associated with Oglethorpe University
- J. J. Haverty, of furniture retailer Haverty's and the Rhodes-Haverty Building
- Alice Hawthorne, victim of the 1996 Centennial Olympic Park bombing
- Daniel Whitehead Hicky, poet and columnist
- Donald L. Hollowell, civil rights attorney
- Evan Howell, politician, early telegraph operator, Confederate Army officer
- Sister Mary Melanie Holliday, Catholic nun
- Iser-Kyner, Alaska Native, "Kinugumiut Eskimo tribe"
- Vivian Malone Jones, civil rights activist
- James C. "Chris" Kelly, half of the rap duo Kris Kross
- James L. Key, mayor of Atlanta 1919–1923 and 1931–1937
- George Edward King, hardware store founder
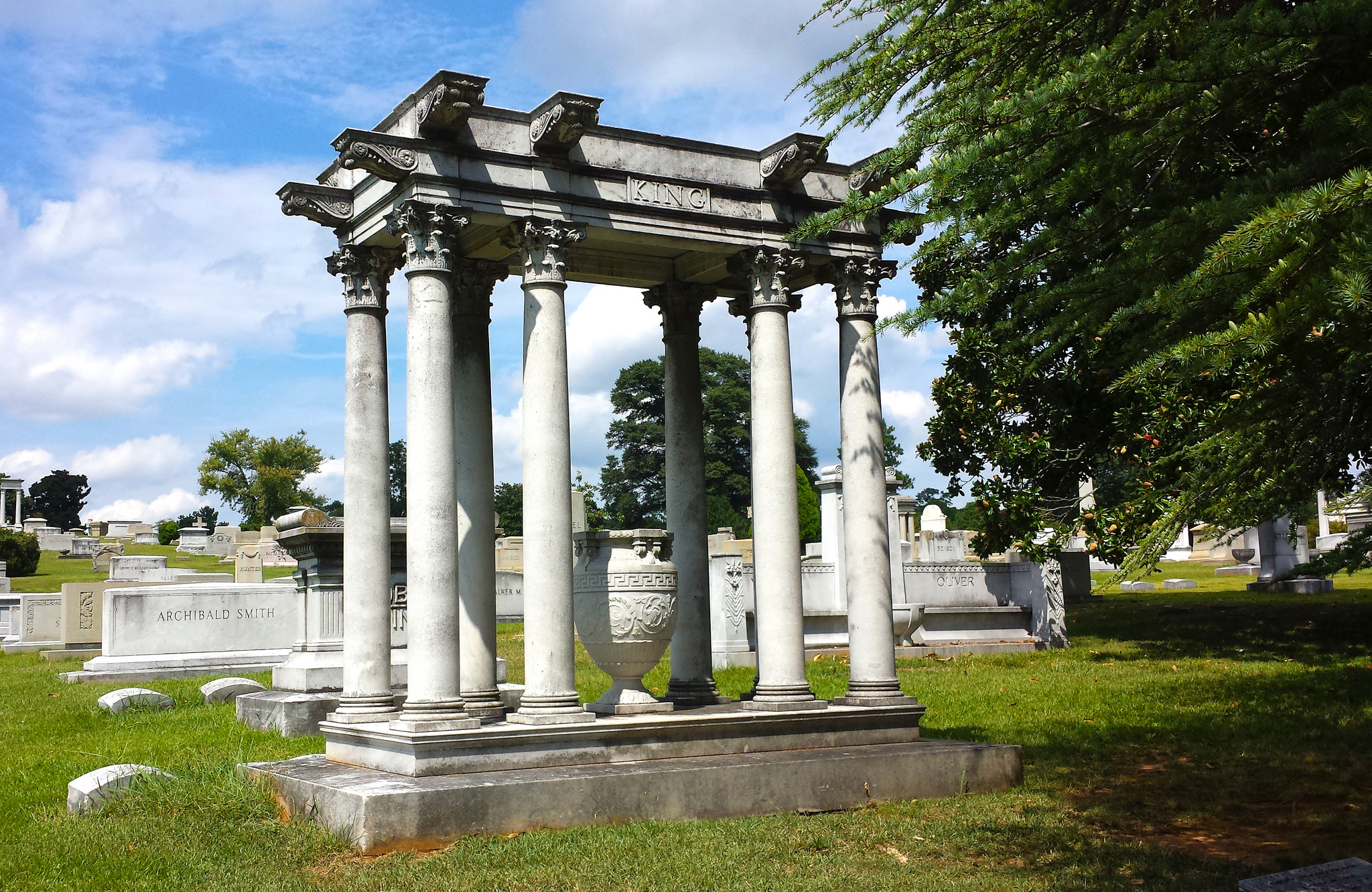
  Memorial Monument for George King of King Hardware Stores in Atlanta
- Enrico Leide, cellist, first conductor of the Atlanta Symphony Orchestra (1920–1930)
- Mike Lewis, professional football player
- Helen Dortch Longstreet, journalist, first woman to run for office in Georgia
- Evelyn G. Lowery, civil rights activist
- Joseph Lowery, 3rd president of the Southern Christian Leadership Conference
- Ralph Emerson McGill, journalist and civil rights leader
- Livingston Mims, mayor of Atlanta from 1901 to 1903
- Jim Mitchell, football tight end for the Atlanta Falcons, coach for Morehouse College and Morris Brown College
- Arthur James Moore, Bishop of the Methodist Episcopal Church
- Cleland Kinloch Nelson, Episcopal bishop
- Frances Newman, novelist
- Bill Paschal, football running back for Georgia Tech and the New York Giants
- William H. Peck, poet and author
- Edward C. Peters, real estate developer, owner of Edward C. Peters House
- G. Lloyd Preacher, architect of Atlanta City Hall, Briarcliff Hotel and Medical Arts Building
- Rich Homie Quan, rapper
- Isaac Newton Ragsdale, mayor of Atlanta from 1927 to 1931
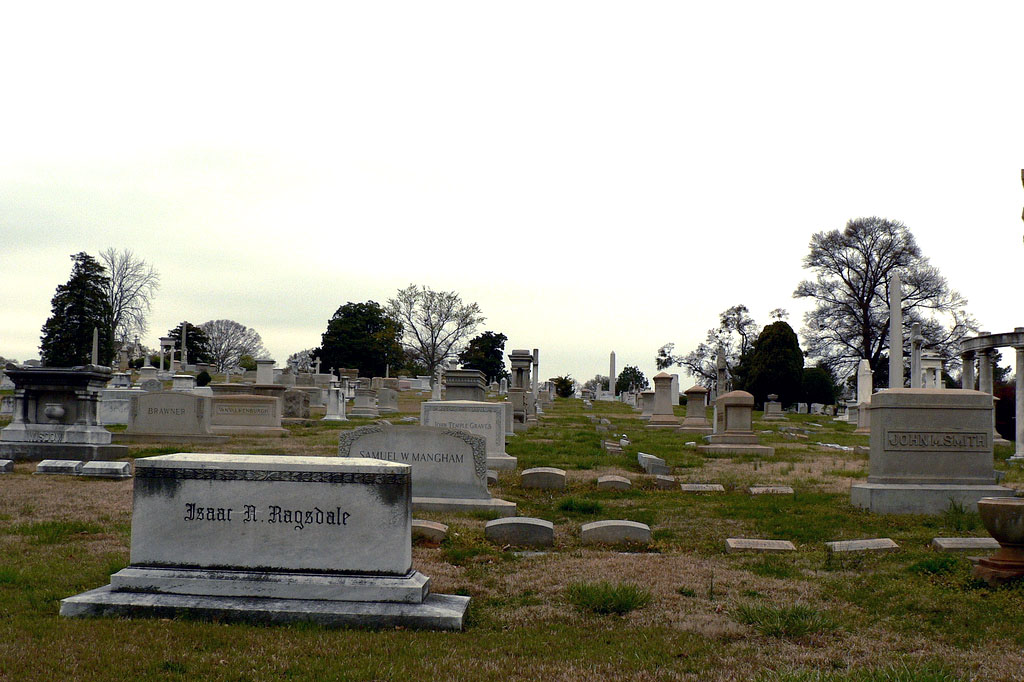
  Atlanta mayor Isaac N. Ragsdale's headstone at left
- Amos G. Rhodes, of Rhodes Furniture, the Rhodes-Haverty Building and Rhodes Hall
- Walter H. Rich and Richard H. "Dick" Rich, two presidents of the Rich's department store chain
- Harry Van Buren Richardson, theologian, writer, and the first president of the Interdenominational Theological Center
- Frank Mason Robinson, creator of the name and logo of Coca-Cola
- Nick Rogers, football linebacker who played for Georgia Tech and in the NFL
- William Lindsay Scruggs, author, lawyer and diplomat
- Robert Shaw, conductor of the Atlanta Symphony Orchestra
- Jerry Randolph Smith, co-pilot on the Southern Airways Flight 932 crash in 1970
- Rankin M. Smith Sr., businessman, philanthropist & owner of Atlanta Falcons
- Frank Lebby Stanton, first poet laureate of Georgia, lyricist of "Just Awearyin' for You"
- Nan Bagby Stephens, playwright and composer
- Cyrus W. Strickler (1872–1953), physician and professor at Emory University
- Louise Suggs, professional golfer, one of the founders of the LPGA Tour
- Isaac T. Tichenor, president of Agricultural and Mechanical College of Alabama 1872-1881
- Dorothy Rogers Tilly, civil rights activist
- Charles Davis Tillman, early influence on southern gospel music
- Henry Holcombe Tucker, chancellor of the University of Georgia and president of Mercer University
- Nedra Tyre, author (ashes spread on her mother's grave)
- C. T. Vivian, civil rights leader
- Rico Wade, music producer, hip hop pioneer and member of Organized Noize
- Horace Taliaferro Ward, first African American to serve as a United States district judge in Georgia
- B. Frank Whelchel, a U.S. Representative from Georgia
- Robert Woodruff, businessman, President of Coca-Cola
- Anna Irwin Young, a charter member of the American Mathematical Association (in 1916).

== Former interments ==
Atlanta University President Edmund Asa Ware was buried in a plot that straddled the then-segregated white and African-American sections of the cemetery in 1885. His body was moved to a memorial on the A.U. campus nine years later. Atlanta mayor Ivan Allen Jr. was buried at Westview when he died in 2003, but he was reinterred at Oakland Cemetery in 2009.

== Location ==
The cemetery is located at 1680 Westview Drive SW, Atlanta, GA 30310.

== See also ==
- List of oldest structures in Atlanta
- Westview Neighborhood
