= Cyrus W. Strickler =

American physician and educator (1873–1953)

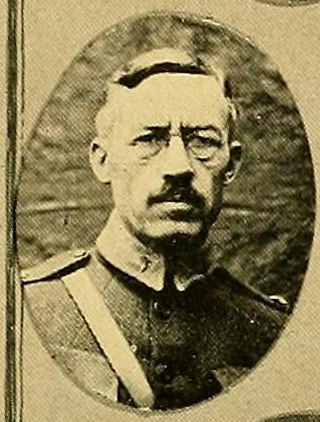
- Strickler in a 1919 publication
- Born: Cyrus Warren Strickler; November 1, 1873; Fishersville, Augusta County, Virginia, U.S.
- Died: July 23, 1953 (aged 79); Atlanta, Georgia, U.S.
- Resting place: Westview Cemetery; Atlanta, Georgia, U.S.
- Education: Washington and Lee University
- Alma mater: Atlanta Medical College (MD)
- Occupations: Physician; educator
- Spouse: Anne Virginia Williams (m. 1903)
- Children: 2

Cyrus Warren Strickler Sr. (November 1, 1873 – July 23, 1953) was an American physician and professor of clinical medicine at Emory University. He served in the United States Army Medical Corps during World War I.

== Early life ==
Cyrus Warren Strickler was born on November 1, 1873, in Fishersville, Augusta County, Virginia, to Mary Frances (née Moore) and Givens Brown Strickler (1840–1913). At a young age, his family moved to Atlanta, Georgia. His father was a veteran of the Confederate States Army and pastor of Central Presbyterian Church in Atlanta. He attended private schools in Atlanta and Washington and Lee University. He graduated, with first honor, from Atlanta Medical College with a Doctor of Medicine in 1897.

== Career ==
Strickler interned at Grady Memorial Hospital from 1897 to 1899 and was resident physician at Elkin Cooper Sanatorium in Atlanta from 1899 to 1901. While at Grady, he started the first clinical laboratory in Atlanta. In 1901, he started as a lecturer in minor surgery at Emory. He practiced general medicine and surgery in Atlanta until 1908. He specialized in internal medicine. He also worked in the Georgia Baptist Hospital, St. Joseph's Infirmary, Atlanta Medical College and the Emory University School of Medicine. In 1908, he helped start a clinical-bedside training technique at the Emory Medical School. At the time of his death, the practice was still in place. In 1908, he became associated with Dr. W. B. Armstrong. In 1911, he became associate professor of medicine at Emory and in 1916, he became professor of medicine. He was also professor at Grady Hospital and was a consultant for other hospitals in Atlanta.

During World War I, Strickler was a member of the United States Army Medical Corps with World War I Base Hospital 43 (1st Emory Unit). He entered the unit at the rank of major on May 6, 1918. He was an executive and summary court officer in Blois. On February 20, 1919, he took command of Base Hospital 43. He attained the rank of lieutenant colonel on March 1, 1919. He became executive officer of the unit. For his service with the unit, France named him Officer d'Académie. In 1930, he retired from Emory as a professor emeritus. In 1932, he was on the committee that organized the Medical Service Bureau in Atlanta. He held summer extension clinics in Georgia. He continued practicing medicine until April 1953.

Strickler was a member of the Fulton Medical Society, the Medical Association of Georgia and the American Medical Association. He was a fellow of the American College of Physicians and the American Board of Internal Medicine. He was also a member of the Phi Chi medical fraternity, Alpha Omega Alpha, Atlanta Athletic Club and Kiwanis.

== Personal life ==
Strickler married Anne Virginia Williams, daughter of William Williams, of Columbus, Georgia, on February 24, 1903. They had two sons, Givens Brown and Cyrus Warren Jr. He was a member of Central Presbyterian Church for most of his life. In 1919, he lived at 95 East 14th Street in Atlanta. Later in life, he lived at 871 Oakdale Road N.E. in Atlanta. He was a Democrat.

Strickler died on July 23, 1953, at a hospital in Atlanta. He was interred in Westview Cemetery in Atlanta.

== Legacy ==
In 1954, a six-story building in Atlanta was named Dr. Cyrus W. Strickler, Sr., Doctors Building in his honor. A scholarship at Emory University School of Medicine was named after Strickler.
