= Eskimo kiss =

Inuit gesture of affection

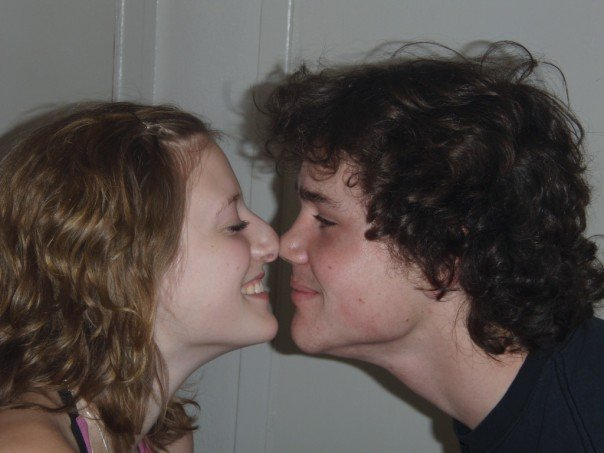
A couple doing a nose rub

An Eskimo kiss, nose kiss, or nose rub is a gesture of affection where one rubs the tip of one's nose against another person's nose or face. In Inuit culture, the gesture is known as a kunik, and consists of pressing or rubbing the tip of one's nose against another's cheek. In non-Inuit English-speaking culture, two people Eskimo kiss by rubbing the tips of their noses together. Nose-to-cheek kisses are found in other cultures as well.

== History ==
When early Western explorers of the Arctic first witnessed Inuit nose rubbing as a greeting behavior, they dubbed it Eskimo kissing. (Note: The Inuit do not refer to themselves as "Eskimos"; it is an exonym that many consider offensive.) The practice was also prevalent in nearby non-Inuit cultures.

== In Inuit culture ==
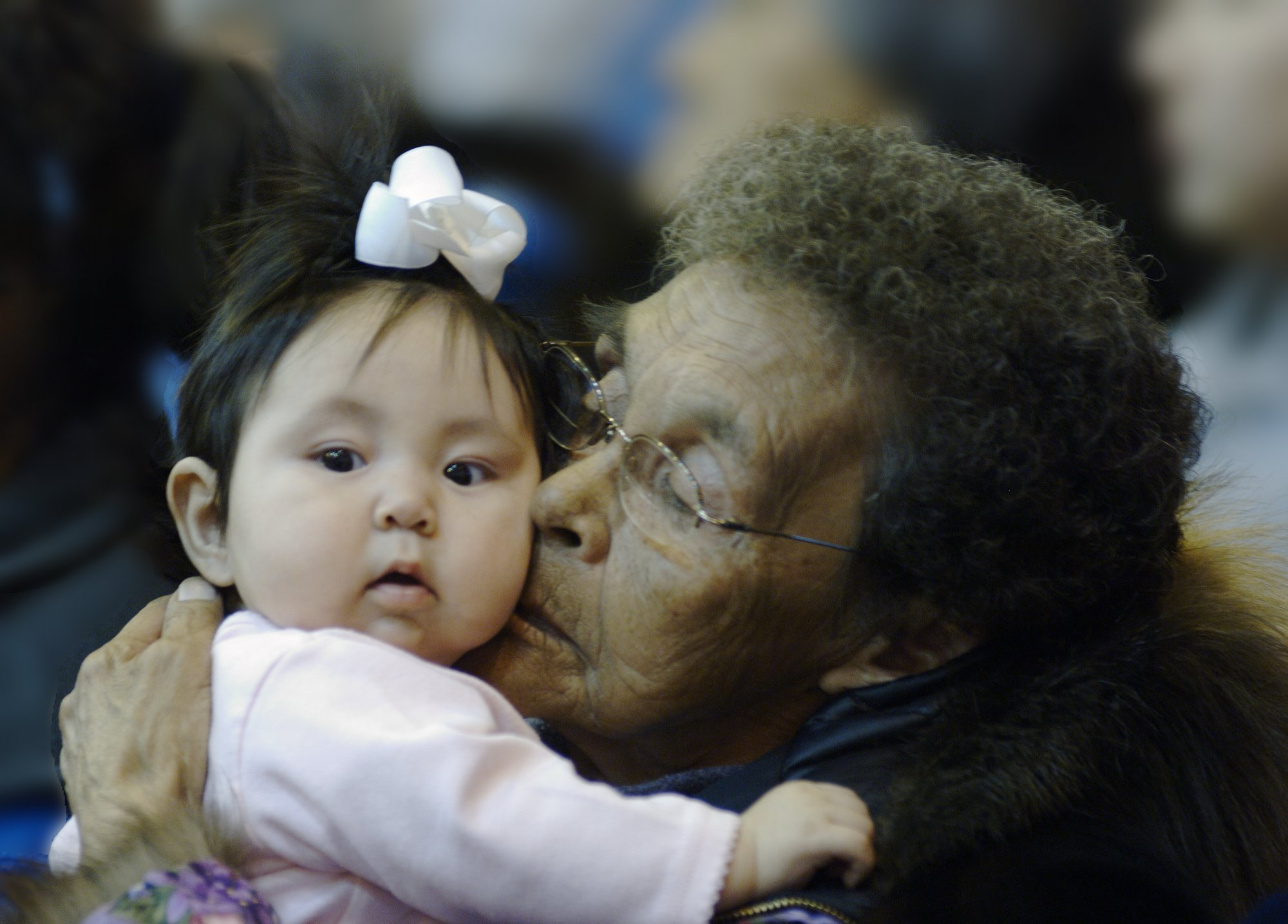
An Iñupiaq woman shares a kunik with a small child at a Nalukataq in Utqiaġvik, Alaska, 2007

Among the Inuit, kunik is a form of expressing affection, usually between family members and loved ones or to young children, that involves pressing the nose and upper lip against the skin (commonly of the cheeks or forehead) and breathing in, causing the loved one's skin or hair to be suctioned against the nose and upper lip. A common misconception is that the practice arose so that Inuit could kiss without their mouths freezing together. Rather, it is a non-erotic but intimate greeting used by people who, when they meet outside, often have little except their nose and eyes exposed.

The greeting was described in reports of Kerlungner and Wearner, part of a group of Alaskan Native people touring the United States with entrepreneur Miner W. Bruce in the 1890s: "Mr. Bruce yesterday instructed Kerlungner and Wearner that in this country they should not rub noses, and to close the lesson the two young women kissed each other in the new style for a beginning, both seeming to fear that they looked silly as they did it."

== In other cultures ==
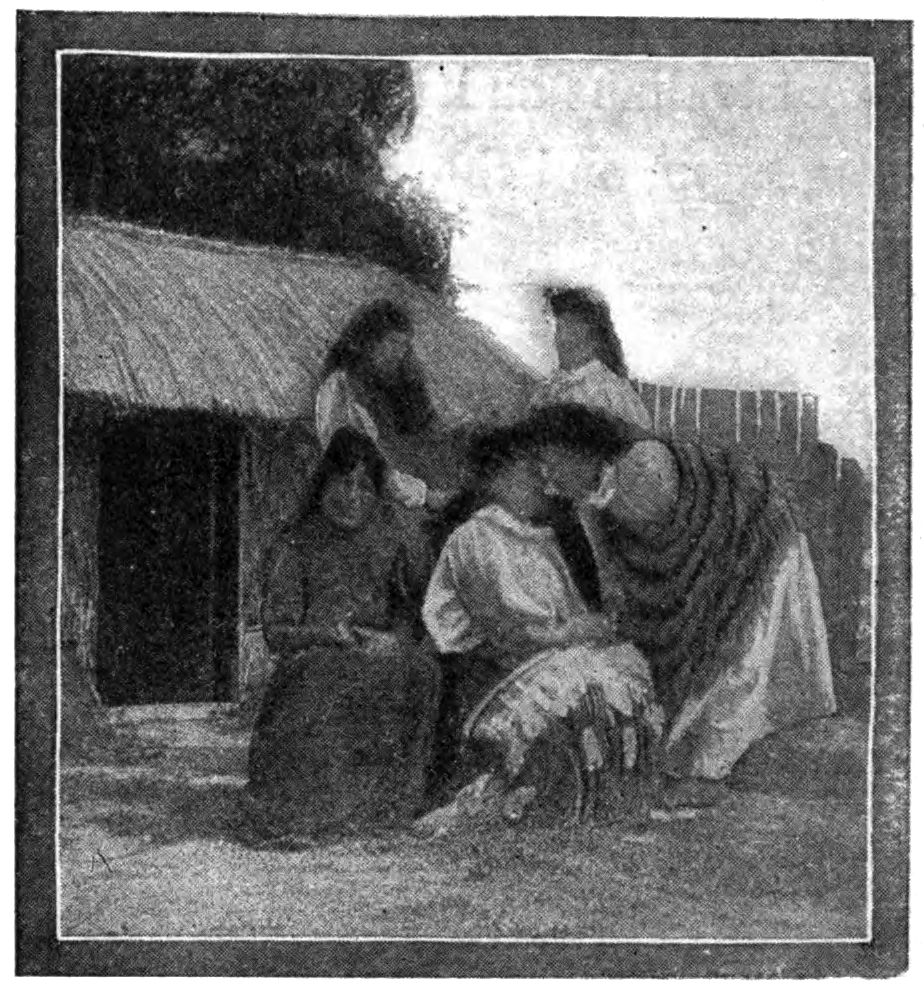
Image of two people "nose rubbing" in Mark Twain's Following the Equator 1897 travelogue

Other peoples use similar greeting practices, notably the Māori of New Zealand and Hawaiians, who practice the hongi and honi greetings, respectively. Mongolian nomads of the Gobi Desert have a similar practice, as do certain Southeast Asian cultures, such as the Bengalis, Khmer people, Lao people, Thai people, Vietnamese people, Timor, Savu people, Sumba people and Iban people. Nose kissing is also employed as a traditional greeting by Arabs in a number of regions in the Gulf countries and Yemen.

== See also ==
- Cheek kissing
- Nose fetishism
