= Henrietta Stanley =

Henrietta Stanley may refer to:

- Henrietta Stanley, 4th Baroness Strange (1687–1718), English peeress
- Henrietta Stanley, Baroness Stanley of Alderley (1807–1895), campaigner for women's education
- Henrietta Stanley Dull (1863–1964), American food writer
