= Cabildo (opera) =

Opera composed by Amy Beach

- Opera by Amy Beach
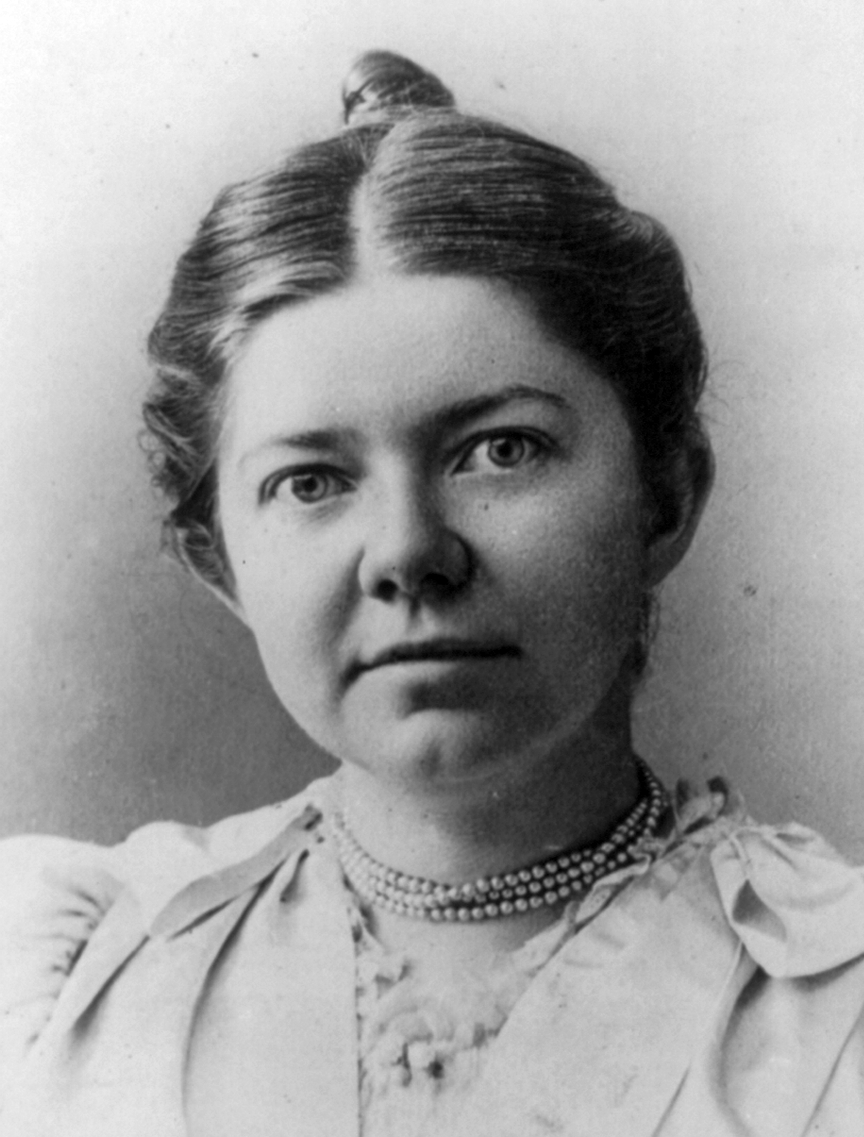
- The composer
- Librettist: Nan Bagby Stephens
- Language: English
- Premiere: February 27, 1945; University of Georgia, Athens

Cabildo is the only opera by the American composer Amy Beach, her opus 149. This chamber opera is in one act and has a libretto by Nan Bagby Stephens. Beach composed the music in 1932 and made use of folksong and Creole tunes. However, the work was not performed in her lifetime and received its first performance in 1945.

== Performance history ==
Hugh Hodgson, who headed the Opera Workshop at the University of Georgia in Athens, Georgia, was planning a performance of Cabildo in 1940. The project was delayed because of the war, and the opera was finally presented on 27 February 1945, two months after Beach's death.

Subsequent performances were in 1981, at the University of Missouri-Kansas City, and in 1982, at the American Musicological Society meeting and the Sonneck Society. The first fully professional production was on May 13, 1995, as part of the "Great Performers at Lincoln Center" series, led by Ransom Wilson and directed by Hans Nieuwenhuis.

The Texas premiere of Cabildo was performed by Houston's Opera Vista on September 22, 2007 at the Museum of Fine Arts' Bayou Bend, conducted by Opera Vista's Artistic Director, Viswa Subbaraman and stage directed by Chuck Winkler. This performance led to Opera Vista being invited to perform Cabildo at the actual Cabildo in New Orleans on April 18, 2009. The performance was again conducted by Viswa Subbaraman with stage direction by Joe Carl White. In 2017 Central City Opera produced a fully staged version as part of their summer festival. Cabildo was performed at the Grimeborn Festival at the Arcola Theatre, Dalston, London in August 2019, directed by Emma Jude Harris with piano trio accompaniment conducted by John Warner.

== Roles ==
- Barker (spoken role)
- Tom (tenor)
- Mary (mezzo-soprano)
- Pierre Lafitte (baritone)
- Dominique You (tenor)
- Gaoler (bass)
- The Lady Valerie (soprano)

== Synopsis ==
=== Prologue ===
At The Cabildo, a tour guide (Barker) leads a group of tourists to the cell where the notorious pirate, Pierre Lafitte, was imprisoned during the War of 1812. The guide tells the story of Pierre and his beloved Lady Valerie, then leads the group on. Tom and Mary, two newlyweds, remain in the cell and sing of their love. Tom rejoins the tour group while Mary stays behind, saying that she is tired. Wondering about the pirate and his lover, she falls asleep.

=== The Dream ===
It is now 1812. The British hold New Orleans under siege and Pierre Lafitte awaits execution in his cell. He is wrongly accused of having ordered the destruction of his own ship, the Falcon, and of the death of his lover Lady Valerie (who was a passenger) in order to cover his supposed theft of her bracelet. Alone in his cell, he vows to find Valerie before facing the firing squad.

The drunken Gaoler brings Lafitte's lieutenant, Dominique You, into the cell. Dominique tells Pierre that General (later President) Andrew Jackson has come to an agreement with Pierre's brother Jean Lafitte. Pierre will find the cell door open for his escape, in return for the pirates' full participation in breaking the British siege and defending New Orleans. Pierre, however, is more concerned about the fate of Valerie. Dominique reluctantly tells him that the Falcon is lost, and urges him to tell the truth about the bracelet, which Valerie gave him as a token of their love. Pierre refuses, then sings of his love for Valerie. Dominique gives Pierre the bracelet which, minutes earlier, he had surreptitiously removed from the Governor's desk. He leaves as Pierre invokes Valerie's name.

The ghost of Valerie appears and tells of the destruction of the Falcon and her subsequent drowning by one of Lafitte's own men. Pierre now wishes only to join her in death, but Valerie insists that he clear his name by joining General Jackson. They recall the evening when she gave Pierre the bracelet, and then sing of their love in a climactic duet. As she leaves, Valerie tells Pierre she has unlocked the cell door, making way for his escape.

=== Epilogue ===
Tom returns to the cell to find Mary awakening from her dream. She insists that her dream was real, and that "it was not the General who made a hero of Lafitte. It was the Lady Valerie and love."

== Recording ==
- Delos DE 3170: Stephen Mo Hanan, Anthony Dean Griffey, Charlotte Hellekant, Eugene Perry, Paul Groves, Thomas Paul, Lauren Flanigan; The New York Concert Singers; Instrumental ensemble; Ransom Wilson, conductor
