= Atlanta Opera =

Opera company in Atlanta, Georgia, US

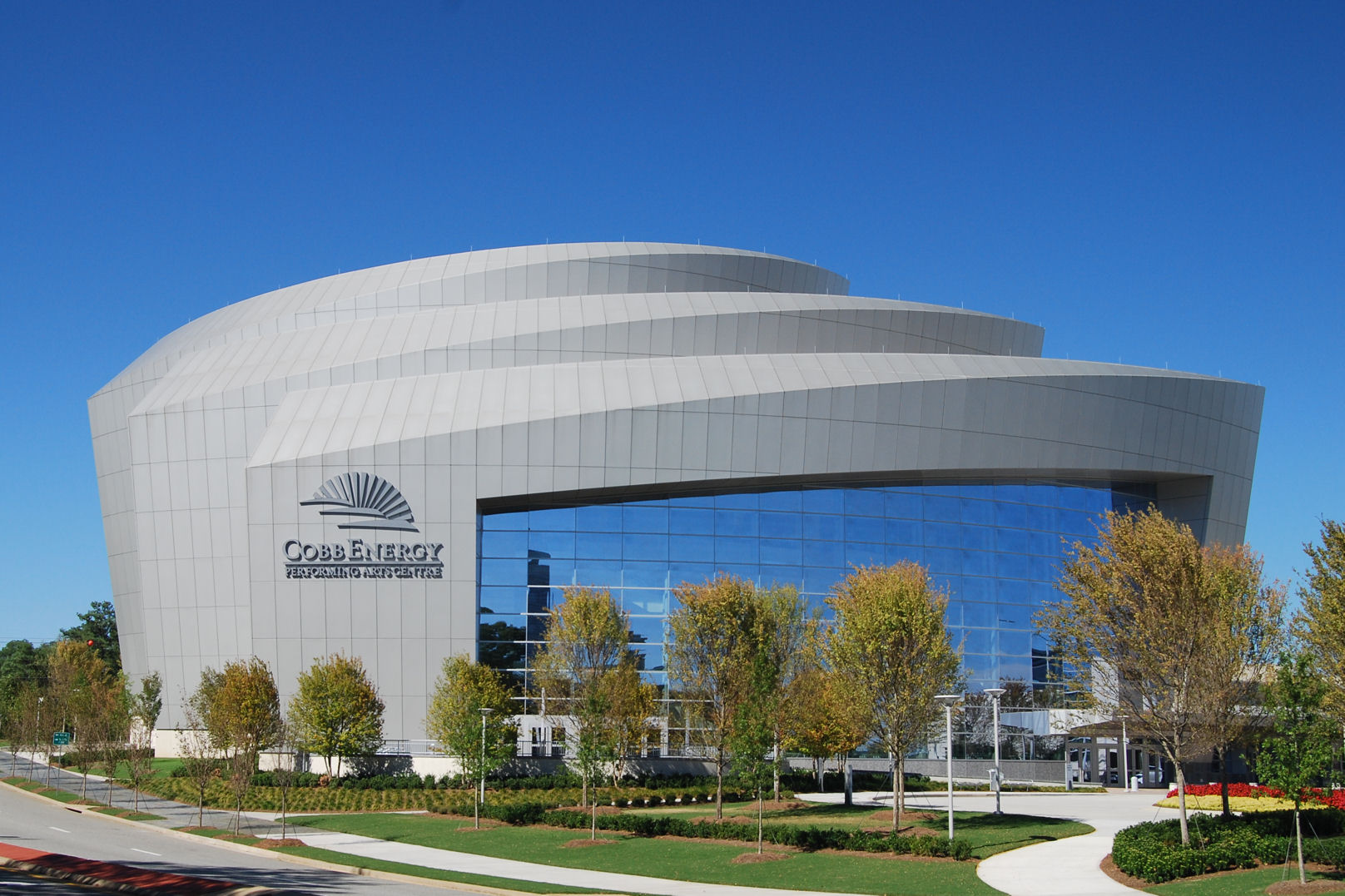
Cobb Energy Performing Arts Centre

The Atlanta Opera is an opera company based in Atlanta, Georgia, US. Founded in 1979, the company produces four mainstage opera productions each season at Cobb Energy Performing Arts Centre, its primary performance venue since 2007. It also presents smaller-scale productions and operates education, artist-development, film, and new-works programs.

Tomer Zvulun has served as the company's general and artistic director since 2013. Under his leadership, The Atlanta Opera launched its Discoveries series, Studio Artists program, Film Studio, and New Opera Works Festival.

In 2024, Opera America placed The Atlanta Opera among the 10 largest opera companies in the United States after its annual operating budget reached $15 million. In 2026, the company began construction on the Molly Blank Center for Opera and the Arts, scheduled to open late 2027 as its permanent administrative and artistic home with performance, rehearsal, education, and office spaces.

Between 2023 and 2026, The Atlanta Opera presented the four operas of Richard Wagner's Der Ring des Nibelungen individually over four seasons, concluding with Götterdämmerung. The company plans to present the four operas together as two complete cycles during The Atlanta Opera Ring Festival in June 2029.

== History ==
Opera had an established presence in Atlanta before the founding of The Atlanta Opera. Beginning in the early 20th century, the Metropolitan Opera included Atlanta on its annual national tour, presenting week-long sessions at venues including the Auditorium-Armory, the Fox Theatre, and the Boisfeuillet Jones Atlanta Civic Center. Performers appearing during the Atlanta tours included Enrico Caruso, Leontyne Price, and Luciano Pavarotti. The Metropolitan Opera stopped touring Atlanta in 1986.

The Atlanta Civic Opera was formed in 1979 through the merger of Atlanta Lyric Opera and Georgia Opera. Composer Thomas Pasatieri was its first artistic director. The company presented its first production, Pasatieri's The Seagull, at the Fox Theatre on March 14, 1980, followed by Verdi's La traviata later that month. In December 1980, it presented a gala at Atlanta Symphony Hall featuring Catherine Malfitano, Jerry Hadley, and Samuel Ramey. The company adopted the name The Atlanta Opera in 1985.

The Atlanta Opera has had a number of home venues: in 1990 it moved to the Atlanta Symphony Hall, in 1995 to the Fox Theatre, in 1998 to its own building, the Atlanta Opera Center at 728 West Peachtree St., in 2003 to the Boisfeuillet Jones Atlanta Civic Center, and then in 2007, the company moved into its final performance home at Cobb Energy Performing Arts Centre, where The Atlanta Opera became the venue's first resident company.

Tomer Zvulun became the company's general and artistic director in 2013. During his tenure, The Atlanta Opera expanded its mainstage season from three to four productions and developed initiatives including the Discoveries series, Studio Artists program, and New Opera Works Festival. The company's development under Zvulun became the subject of a Harvard Business School case study, and The Atlanta Opera received a nomination from the International Opera Awards.

During the COVID-19 pandemic, while many opera companies closed their doors, The Atlanta Opera presented live outdoor performances through its Big Tent Series. The company also established The Atlanta Opera Film Studio in 2020 to produce and distribute filmed and live streamed opera during a time when live performance was largely not accessible.

In 2024, Opera America placed The Atlanta Opera among the top 10 largest opera companies in the United States after its annual operating budget reached $15 million.

In 2025, Iván López Reynoso was appointed principal conductor beginning with the 2025/2026 season. He succeeded Arthur Fagen, who became Music Director Emeritus after two decades with the company.

Between 2023 and 2026, The Atlanta Opera presented the four operas of Richard Wagner's Der Ring des Nibelungen individually over four seasons. The company plans to present two complete cycles during The Atlanta Opera Ring Festival in June 2029. In 2026, it also began construction on the Molly Blank Center for Opera and the Arts, scheduled to open in 2027 as its permanent administrative and artistic home.

== See also ==
- Opera in Atlanta
- Arts in Atlanta
