= Daniel Whitehead Hicky =

American poet

- Born: December 6, 1900; Social Circle, Georgia
- Died: July 17, 1976; Atlanta, Georgia
- Occupations: Poet, Columnist, Editor
- Writing career
- Notable works: Bright Harbor, Wild Heron

Daniel Whitehead Hicky (December 6, 1900 - July 17, 1976) was an American poet and one of the most widely published poets in America during his prime.

In addition to his six published books, Hicky's work was regularly published in the national magazines, newspapers, and periodicals. He also wrote a column for the Atlanta Journal and Constitution, "As I Was Saying", discussing news, events and gossip from the local country clubs such as Piedmont Driving Club and Capitol City Club. He also gave lectures and readings of his poems throughout the South and Eastern US at various colleges, clubs, and poetry societies.

One of his most popular poems was "A Letter From the Front", the popularity was partially due to Margaret Mitchell (author of "Gone With The Wind") sending it to fans when they asked if Georgia is really like what it is in the novel. It was also published in the Saturday Evening Post, July 17, 1943.

During his prime he traveled the world extensively providing with material. Though many of his poems were written about the home state of Georgia, particularly Sea Island, Georgia. He was president of the Atlanta Writers Club for two years, and for many years was considered for Poet Laureate of Georgia. In 1931, he won the American Poetry Society's prize for his poem, "Machines". And in 1941, he was short-listed for the Pulitzer Prize for Poetry.

Later in life, he worked as an editor at the Department of Agriculture in Washington D.C. Encouraged by friends and fans he published a final farewell book, "The Poems of Daniel Whitehead Hicky" (1975), the year before he died. It includes reissues of old favorites and some poems published for the first time.

His ancestors include Col. Philip Hickey (first generation Irish-American), owner of Hope Estate Plantation in Baton Rouge, La. And William Whitehead, poet laureate of England (1757). He is buried in Westview Cemetery in Atlanta near his sister, Elizabeth and husband Karl.

== Published works ==
His published work includes:

- Bright Harbor (New York, Henry Holt and Co., 1932)
- Thirteen Sonnets for Georgia (1933)
- Call Back the Spring (New York, Henry Holt and Co, 1935)
- Wild Heron (Harper, 1940) OCLC 2721066
- Never the Nightingale (Atlanta, Tupper and Love, 1951)
- Poems of Daniel Whitehead Hicky (Cherokee Publishing Co., Atlanta, GA, 1975) ISBN 9780877970323

His poems were frequently published in newspapers and magazines such as Harper's Magazine, The Atlanta Constitution, The Free Lance–Star, The Saturday Evening Post, The North American Review, The Pittsburgh Press, The New York Times , Scribner's Magazine, The American Mercury, Harper's Bazaar, Cosmopolitan Magazine, The Catholic World, McCall's Magazine, The Georgia Review, The Ladies' Home Journal, New York Herald-Tribune, Good Housekeeping, The Yale Review, Georgia Magazine, The North American Review, The Saturday Review of Literature, The Progressive Farmer, and The Bellringer.

== Awards and distinctions ==
- Shortlisted for the Pulitzer Prize for poetry in 1941
- 1st Prize (Tie) Poetry Society of America in 1931
