= Nose fetishism =

Sexual attraction to the nose

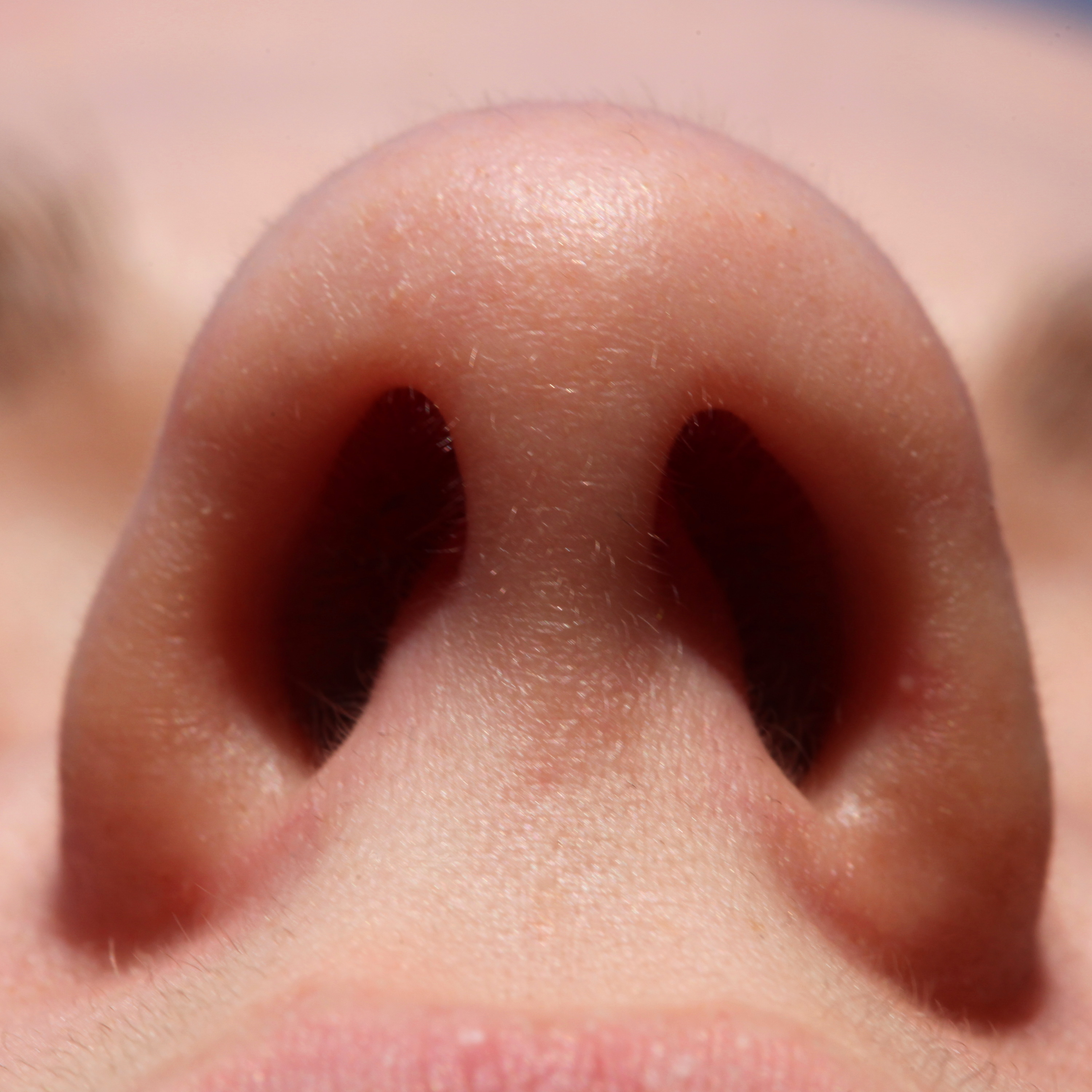
Human nose

Nose fetishism, nose partialism, or nasophilia is the partialism (or paraphilia) for the nose. This may include the sexual attraction to a specific form of physical variation of appearance (such as shape and size), or a specific area (for example; the bridge or nostrils). The fetish may manifest itself in a desire for actual physical contact and interaction, or specific fantasies such as the desire to penetrate the nostrils with a penis, tongue, or with a finger (comparable with fingering). Nose fetishism can also include the desire to ejaculate into the nostrils or onto the nose. Some people with this fetish masturbate while looking at someone with a nose they find extremely attractive. Some people with this fetish also enjoy pinching someone's nose so that they open their mouths to breathe.

Other fantasies may include the desire to observe or experience a transformation of a nose with reference to an element of a fictional work such as Pinocchio, or ideas concerning the transformation of the nose into that of another creature's, like a pig's snout as a means of sexually humiliating a partner or acquaintance. These fantasies may be assisted with use of props, role-play or transformation fiction, in the form of writing, artwork, or modified photographs of people (known as morphing).

Sigmund Freud interpreted the nose as a substitute for the penis.

== See also ==
- Eskimo kiss
