= Nan Bagby Stephens =

American writer

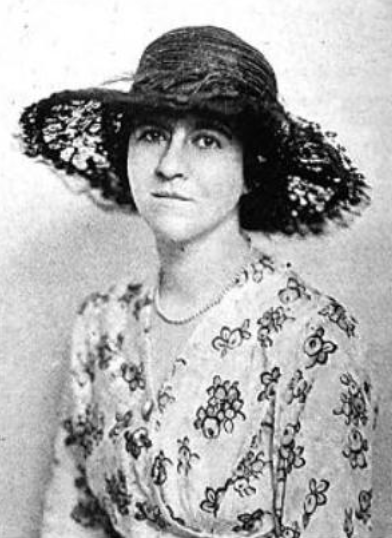
- Nan Bagby Stephens, from a 1919 publication
- Born: Nannie Bagby Stephens; 1883; Atlanta, Georgia, U.S.
- Died: December 29, 1946 (age 63); Georgia, U.S.
- Occupations: Dramatist, writer, composer, librettist
- Notable work: Roseanne (1923), Cabildo (1932)
- Relatives: Louis Hasselmans (brother-in-law)

Nannie "Nan" Bagby Stephens (1883 – December 29, 1946) was an American playwright and composer, best known for the libretto of Cabildo (1932), an opera with music by Amy Beach.

== Early life and education ==
Stephens was from Atlanta, Georgia, the daughter of James McConnell Stephens and Zipporah Bagby Stephens. Both of her grandfathers were slaveowners in Georgia. Her younger sister Frances married French opera conductor Louis Hasselmans. She graduated from Girls High School in Atlanta and Agnes Scott College, and trained as a pianist in Vienna with Johanna Müller and Theodor Leschetizky.

== Career ==
Stephens, who was white, was known for writing songs and plays based on traditional "negro music" of the American South, often with regional themes and dialect lyrics. Her Broadway play Roseanne was initially produced in 1923 with white performers in blackface, including Chrystal Herne. Soon after, in 1924, it was produced with a Black cast, including Charles Sidney Gilpin, Paul Robeson, and Rose McClendon. Roseanne became a source for Oscar Micheaux's film Body and Soul (1925). Black critic Eric D. Walrond called Roseanne "good art and punk propaganda" in his 1924 review. Roseanne was revived in 1945, at the Ogunquit Playhouse in Maine.

Stephens was a vice-president of the National Federation of Music Clubs, representing the South Atlantic states, and taught play writing at Agnes Scott College in the late 1920s.

== Works ==
- "Lafayette, we have come!" (1918, song, words by J. W. Greer)
- Tradition's Daughter (1918, play)
- Lazy Daisy (1918, play)
- Noblesse Oblige (1918, a comedy)
- Angelo (1918, play)
- "Morning Song"; "Plantation Ditty"; "Little Tin Ho'n" (1921, songs, words by Frank L. Stanton)
- "My Dearie", "When the Little Boy Ran Away", "Hymn to Mother" (1921, songs, words by Frank L. Stanton)
- "A Song of Georgia" (1921, song)
- Roseanne (1923–1924, play)
- "Negro Spirituals" (1924, essay in The New York Times)
- John Barleycorn (1927, play)
- Tares (1927, play)
- The Auction Block (1927, one-act play)
- Charivari (1927, one-act comedy set in Louisiana)
- Barbed Wire (1931)
- Cabildo (1932, one-act opera, music by Amy Beach)
- Glory (1932, novel based on the same story as Roseanne)
- Rome and July (1933, radio serial)
- First Lady, or, Madam President (1933, a play about Mary Todd Lincoln)
- Cousin George (1933, a comedy about a ghost, also known as The Green Vine)
- "Habeas Corpus" (1935, short story)
- Lily (1940, play)
- If I Ever Cease to Love (1941, play)

== Personal life and legacy ==
Stephens died in 1946, in Georgia, and is buried at Westview Cemetery. Her 1932 collaboration with composer Amy Beach, a one-act opera named Cabildo, about a prison in New Orleans, was first recorded in 1965, and saw its first professional production in 1995, at Lincoln Center. It was part of the Muffled Voices Festival, with performances in Moscow and other Russian cities in 2024. Her letters to Beach are in the Amy Beach papers at the University of New Hampshire.
