= John R. Gunn =

American religious figure (1877–1956)

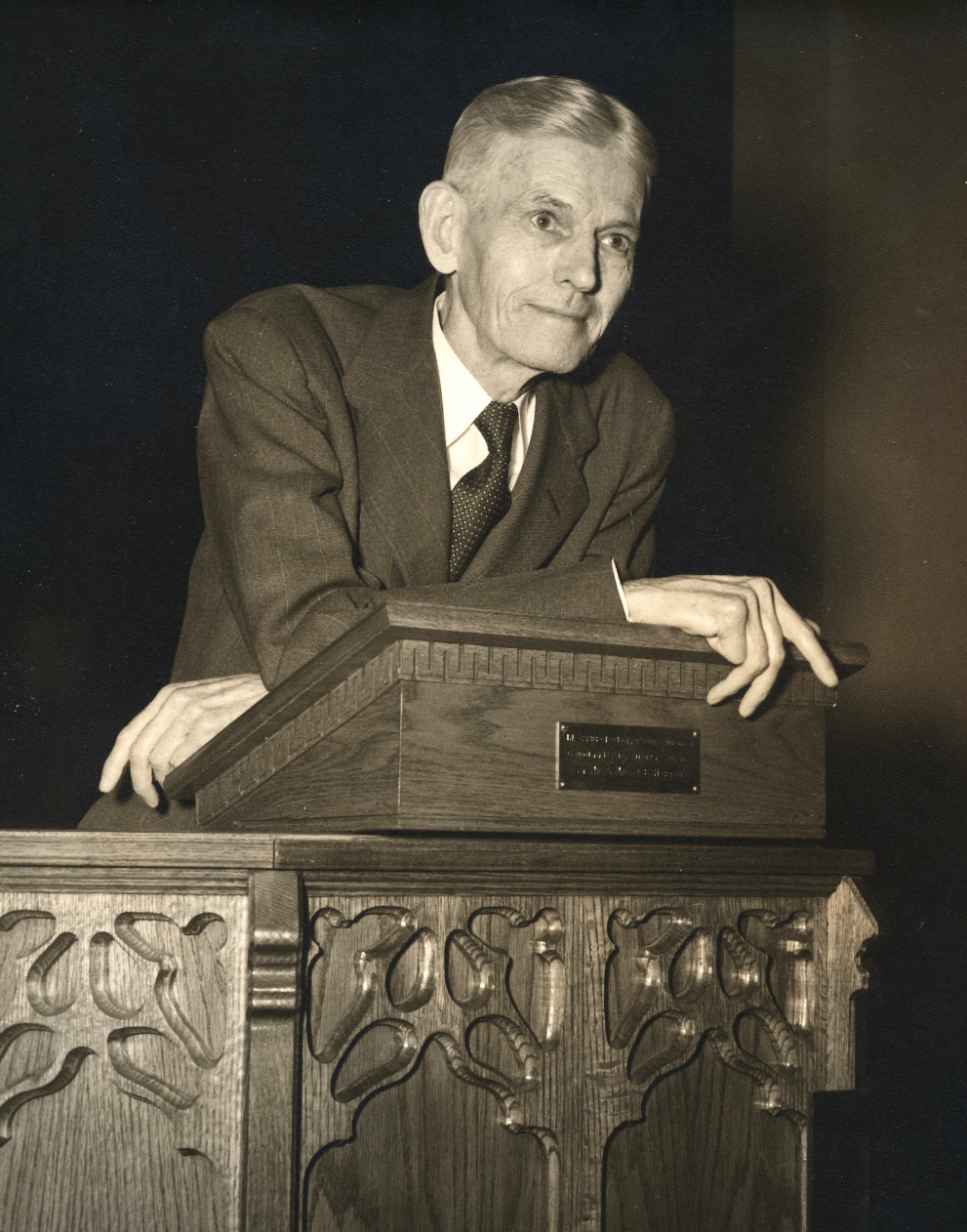

The Reverend John R. Gunn (August 17, 1877 – November 15, 1956) was first a Baptist pastor. During that time, starting at age 31, he authored his first of 12 books, titled At Jesus’ Feet. Then following a successful ministry he became for The Journal Gazette of Fort Wayne, Indiana a columnist whose daily messages inspired readers for over 36 years. After his death, letters to the editor requested that the columns continue, and thereafter these were reprinted daily for 15 more years. A short time later, his messages became radio scripts for the Presbyterian Church. In 1984, The Protestant Radio and Television Center of Atlanta, Georgia was awarded the Peabody Award for their Protestant Hour program, "Be Still and Know", which featured John R. Gunn's meditations. Those meditations continued for 14 years. Reverend Gunn’s work, written and audio, is still available at Day1, a ministry of The Alliance for Christian Media transitioning from Facing Life.

== Early life and education ==
Gunn was born in the wake of the Civil War in the humblest of circumstances in Camak in Warren County Georgia. His father, Robert T. Gunn, was the son of a wealthy cotton planter, Jonathan Gunn of Taliaferro County, Georgia. Robert’s life was cut short due to the rigors and hardships following the Civil War.

His mother, Mary Elizabeth Gunn, was a daughter of Reverend Thomas J. Veazey, a widely known and much beloved Baptist preacher through whose efforts many churches were founded in middle Georgia.

Referring to the privations of the times, Dr. Gunn recalled that he nevertheless had an optimistic outlook on life from the earliest days of his youth. He explained:

"I was not born with a silver spoon in my mouth; there had been a silver spoon laid up for me, but a man by the name of Sherman came marching through Georgia and he created quite a commotion in the midst of which that spoon got misplaced, so I had to make out with a pewter spoon."

He said further,

"In the course of my life I’ve had some dark days—very dark days—but never a day dark enough to put out the light of hope. Through the years I have suffered many disappointments; I have seen time and again some dream, some cherished plan, crumble into dust. But thanks unto God, I have a faith which has kept me continually looking for a brighter tomorrow."

"My optimism dates back to the home of my childhood. I caught it from my mother at whose knee I was taught to pray. Left a widow with four little boys, at the time of the terrible aftermath of the Civil War when the days were dark and there was scarcely a ray of light anywhere on the horizon, when the little family had been moved out of that antebellum mansion into a little two-room cabin, there at the humble fireside she set up a family altar of prayer. Night after night she gathered her little brood around her, read a chapter from the Bible, and knelt with them and lifted her heart to God in prayer."

Following the death of her husband and one son, Mary moved her young family to Jewell, Georgia, where she conducted a millinery and sewing business, and where the boys went to school part of the time and worked part of the time in the cotton factory. Very early in life Jack, as he was known, had said he wanted to be a preacher, and at the age of ten, joined the Baptist church in Jewell, Georgia, a church founded by his grandfather, Reverend Thomas J. Veazey.

During these years young Gunn attracted the attention of Col. W. L. L. Bowen, one of the owners of the cotton factory and a deacon in the Jewell church. He had observed Jack taking an active part in the work of the church, especially in the prayer meetings. Sometimes he would take a text and preach a sermon. Soon, Col. Bowen made an appearance where Jack worked, observed him a long while, and then approached him and said, “Jack, I want to talk with you; tomorrow afternoon I will come for you in my buggy and I want you to take a ride.” Somehow Jack sensed that this was going to be meaningful in terms of his life-dream. Although Col. Bowen was unaware of Jack’s desire to be a preacher, he told Jack that this was what he wanted to tell him and he felt impressed by the Lord to do it. When he discovered Jack’s deep interest in the ministry, he was convinced that the Lord was leading, and the die was cast. Col. Bowen talked to Jack about attending high school and college and introduced him to Baptist leaders in the area.

According to historical records of the Jewell Baptist Church, Jack was licensed to preach at the age of 14. About that time he attended high school in Hephzibah, Georgia, graduating in the spring of 1897. From there he enrolled in Mercer University in Macon, Georgia where he was a champion debater. During his high school and college years, he frequently preached, supplying pulpits and assisting pastors with revival meetings. During his last year at Mercer, he served as pastor of Balerma Baptist Church near Sparta, Georgia. After Mercer University, Jack went to Southern Baptist Theological Seminary in Louisville, Kentucky. While at the seminary (1903–1905), he served Highland Park Church in Louisville, Kentucky. At SBTS he studied under theologians Archibald Thomas Robertson, John Richard Sampey, Edgar Young Mullins, and William Joseph McGlothlin.

== Career ==
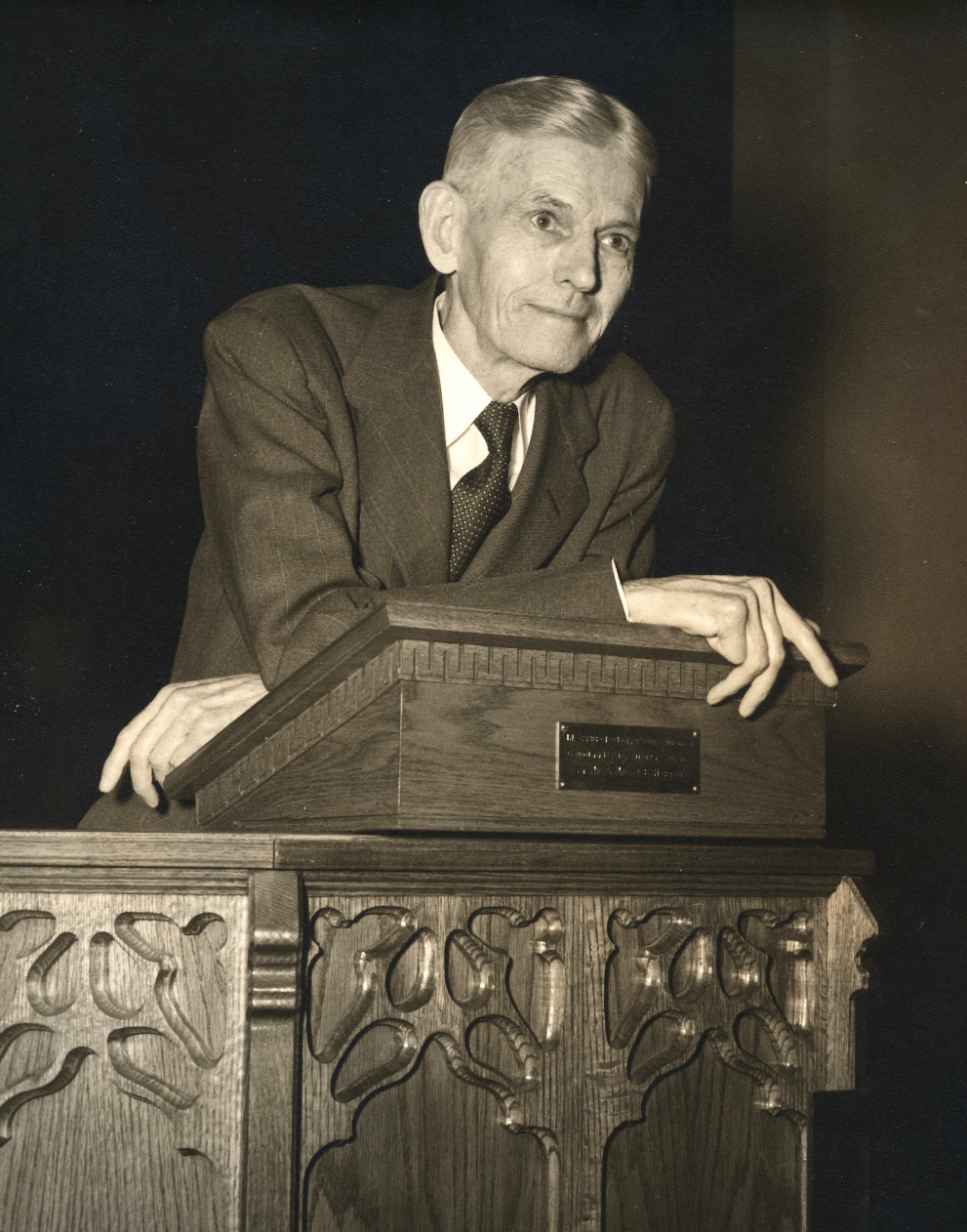
Rev John R Gunn 1951

In the Spring of 1900, following graduation from Mercer, Central Baptist Church of Atlanta extended a call, and this is where he found his beloved wife and life companion, Nellie Higgins. After two years, the Dahlonega Baptist Church (Dahlonega, Georgia) invited him to serve. This assignment was interrupted when an urgent request came from Dr. C. H. S. Jackson, President of Bessie Tift College (Forsyth, Georgia) to raise an endowment fund. Enrolling in the seminary at Louisville was next, after which the Georgia Industrial Home in Macon beckoned Gunn to become their General Manager. Under his leadership at GIH [2] an administrative building called Mumford Hall was constructed. His next pastorate was the Madison Baptist Church of Madison, Georgia, where he served between 1907 and 1911

Bessie Tift College again appealed for his help to raise money, and a fund raising trip to New York City was arranged. While in New York City, he was invited to preach at North Baptist Church. North Baptist promptly invited Reverend Gunn to be their pastor, and there he served for two years. During this period the church was said to have attracted the largest attendance of any church in the downtown part of the city.

Nashville, Tennessee was the next assignment, and here he succeeded Dr. George A. Lofton, [3] who had served Nashville’s Central Baptist Church for the preceding 27 years. Lofton, an author, had written the book, Character Sketches (1890), which inspired Gunn when he was younger.

In 1917, Jack was invited to speak at a medical convention in Nashville, Tennessee, and this led to an invitation to become the minister of the First Baptist Church of Fort Wayne, Indiana, now known as the Fort Wayne Baptist Church. During his tenure, the church became known for strong expository preaching and was one of the most popular churches in the city. A local attorney and U.S. Congressman David Hogg recalled:

Within the memory of the present generation no pastor has ministered to the spiritual development of the people of Fort Wayne as has Reverend John R. Gunn. His sermons ever impart a vitalizing power and contain a wealth of life and inspiration. As an orator, he is versatile and scholarly and stirs the heart as well as appeals to the intellect. His keen understanding, profound knowledge, and virile eloquence have given him the foremost rank among Indiana pastors.

Some years later, on March 21, 1928, Congressman Hogg invited Reverend Gunn to join him at the White House for the Medal of Honor presentation to Charles Lindbergh by President Coolidge. Thereafter, in the afternoon, Congressman Hogg arranged for Rev. Gunn to fly with other members of congress in a demonstration flight with “Lindy.”

An excerpt from a 1952 bulletin of the First Baptist Church of Fort Wayne glowingly states:

Dr. Gunn was our minister from 1917 to 1927. During that decade he wove his way into the heart and affection of throngs of people. Following his retirement from our church, he relinquished the active pastorate due to conditions of health, during the many years following he has had one of the most remarkable of all ministries--the ministry of the printed page. He enters more homes, chats with more people every weekday in the year than any minister could ever hope to do. His daily sermons are masterpieces in literature and always convey pointed messages for moral and righteous living.

His written work is read by people in all walks of life and all religious persuasions. Of this good man, Malachi 2:6 and 7 gives us a true picture: “The law of truth was in his mouth, and iniquity was not found in his lips: he walked with me in peace and equity, and did turn many away from iniquity. . . he is the messenger of the Lord of hosts”.

The Fort Wayne church gave Dr. Gunn the honorary title of Pastor Emeritus.

A remarkable editorial by Frank Roberts appeared in The Journal Gazette of Fort Wayne following Dr. Gunn's death. "For more than 36 years, he daily brought inspiration and light to the readers of The Journal Gazette with his 'Short Sermon For Today,' a column unique in the history of American journalism . . . . he was a master of English prose, a thorough scholar whose Bible was his chief delight and the source of his wisdom."

Dr. Gunn’s career communicating God’s Word in an ecumenical way didn’t even pause at his passing. His daily columns about forming ideals, facing up to life's challenges, building a strong faith, facing tragedy, rendering wise judgment, enriching friendships, seeking forgiveness, repairing a broken heart or loneliness, and just about every other condition in which the human spirit finds itself kept right on going. Countless readers of The Journal Gazette have expressed how much his practical advice meant to them. His column entitled "A Short Sermon for Today" demonstrated Dr. Gunn's unique talent to interpret Christian thought in a condensed fashion and in a way that attracted people of different faiths. Little did Gunn know that the audience for his writing would be expanded through so many different media! First, The Journal Gazette continued to reprint his columns daily for 15 years beyond his passing; then over 2,000 radio stations carried his messages daily for 14 years; today his work is available on the Internet.

His early years were devoted to denominational enterprises such as the Baptist colleges, a Baptist orphanage, Baptist missions, and of course Baptist churches. In later years as a news- paper columnist and author, his interest took on an interfaith dimension that brought the Christian faith to his readers in the public arena. (More biographical information can be found in Volume 3, Baptist Biography, published in 1923 by Index Printing Company, the source of part of this document).

== Marriage and family ==
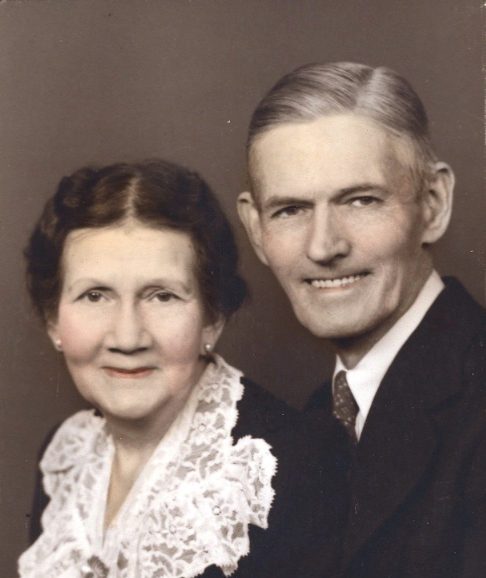

John R. Gunn and Nellie Pearl Higgins of Cohutta, Georgia were united in marriage June 26, 1902, in Atlanta, Georgia. The marriage was solemnized by Reverend R. E. L. Harris, who was the pastor of the Jewell Baptist Church where Gunn was licensed to preach eleven years earlier. Six children came from this union, the first having died in infancy. Nellie shared a deep faith and commitment with her husband. This couple was devoted to each other and their children and grandchildren. Nellie Gunn was also a writer, contributing many articles to the Atlanta Constitution on a variety of topics, including history and bird photography. Toward the end of life, her beloved husband wrote, “My great desire is to demonstrate that God goes with us even down to old age; that his grace is always sufficient for those who trust Him, sufficient to sustain us in old age.” Although two years older than her husband, Nellie survived him and died in 1967. They are buried in Westview Cemetery in Atlanta, Georgia.

== Books by John R. Gunn ==
- At Jesus’ Feet (1908)
- One Hundred Three-Minute Sermons (1927)
- One Hundred More Three-Minute Sermons (1929)
- A Lamp Unto My Feet (1932)
- Snapshots From the Gospels (1933)
- Facing Life (1948)
- The Battle of Christendom (1948)
- Bulwark Never Failing (1955)

== Books compiled from his writings ==
- Good Morning Lord—The Hope of Glory (1977)
- Under the Gunn: Inspiration for Preachers (2012)
- Those Loving Feelings: The Song of Songs for Newlyweds (2013)
- Be the Best at Who You Are: 75 Life-Shaping Bible Proverbs (2013)

== Quotations ==
A few fitting and poignant excerpts taken from Be the Best at Who You Are:

“Faith in God subdues the stings of the past, the worries of the present, and the fears of the future.”

“No man (or woman) has learned how to live until he knows how to distribute himself, where to place the emphasis and where not to place it.”

“The character of a good person is the most illuminating light shining in this world. Genius and brilliance are admirable qualities, but too often brilliance is no more than a display of pointless wit or clever cynicism. It might be clever to face life with a cynical sneer, but it is never elevating. We tend to keep the spotlight turned on mere brilliance and cleverness. But, we should, with advantage, focus on the supreme value of genuine goodness as it shines through the character of the good person.”

“The memories we create are connected with our names. What sort of memories will your name stand for when you are gone? It depends on the kind of life you’ve lived. The memory of the just is blessed (Proverbs 10:7). Be kind, just, and good, and when you depart this world you still leave a name fragrant with blessed memories, which will be a heavenly benediction in all the circles in which you have lived.”

== Internet ==
The Internet site of Day1 features a large collection of Gunn’s original messages in written form and in audio as produced for a nationwide series for the Presbyterian Church USA. The series is entitled, “Be Still and Know” and was carried nationally over 2,000 radio stations.

The web site offers in convenient form some of the thousands of messages originally published in newspapers, books, and over the radio. Reverend Gunn said, "Throughout these thirty-six years I have sought through my daily writings to point out God's answer to human needs as revealed in the Bible.... It is my hope and prayer that He whom they seek to honor will use them in a wide sphere."
