= DeGive's Opera House =

Historic opera venue in Atlanta, Georgia, United States (1871-93)

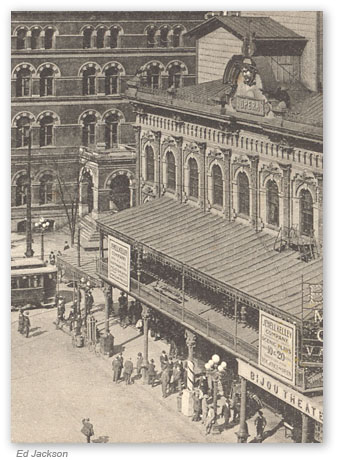
DeGive Opera House building toward the end of its life, doing business as the Bijou Theater

DeGive's Opera House was the main venue for opera in the U.S. city of Atlanta from 1871 until 1893.

== History and location ==
The Atlanta History Center describes how Belgian consul Laurent DeGive purchased an unfinished building at the corner of Marietta and Forsyth and hired architect and civil engineer Max Corput to design the opera house.

The opera house opened on January 24, 1870, and was expanded in 1873–1874 to accommodate over 2,000 people. The opera house was later occupied by the Columbia Theater and later still by the Bijou Theater. The building was demolished in 1921 to make way for the construction of the Palmer Building, which is in turn was replaced in 1976 by an office building at 41 Marietta Street.

Earlier confusion about the location of the original DeGive's stems from two misunderstandings. First, the location was assumed to be the site of the Kimball opera house. However, this building was at the SW corner of Marietta and Forsyth; DeGive's was at the NE corner. Second, it had been assumed that the location may have been on at the corner of Marietta and Broad (not Forsyth) based on Reed's History of Atlanta. However, this reference is only to Atlanta's antebellum Masonic Hall, later destroyed in a fire in May, 1866.

In 1893, DeGive opened the new, larger DeGive's Grand Opera House, which would later become Loew's Grand Theatre, at Peachtree and Forsyth.

== Earlier opera house ==
DeGive's was not the first opera house in Atlanta. The first shows performed in Atlanta predate the American Civil War and were primarily performed in makeshift facilities modified for the operatic arts. Reconstruction saw the formation of the Atlanta Opera House and Building Association. The association obtained the southwest corner of Marietta Street and Forsythe Street to construct a five-story opera house. By 1868, they were out of money. Instead of hosting great performances, Atlanta's first opera house, the Kimball Opera House as it was later known, was sold at a loss. It served as Georgia's state capitol from January 1869 to July 1889.

== See also ==
- Opera in Atlanta
