= Tina McElroy Ansa =

American novelist (1949–2024)

- Born: Tina McElroy; November 18, 1949; Macon, Georgia, U.S.
- Died: September 10, 2024 (aged 74)
- Education: Spelman College
- Occupation: Writer
- Spouse: Jonée Ansa
- Writing career
- Period: 1989–2024

Tina McElroy Ansa (November 18, 1949 – September 10, 2024) was an American novelist, filmmaker, teacher, businesswoman and journalist. Her work appeared in the Los Angeles Times, Newsday,The Atlanta Constitution, Florida Times-Union, Essence Magazine, The Crisis, Ms. Magazine, America Magazine, and Atlanta Magazine.

== Writing career ==
After graduating from college and working for several years in a variety of positions at the Atlanta Constitution, Ansa wrote several novels and has been a frequent contributor to numerous periodicals, including the Los Angeles Times, Newsday, and the Atlanta Journal-Constitution.

Ansa's fiction portrays a variety of Black women in the recent and modern American South, with a blend of the supernatural and traditional superstition. Her first novel, Baby of the Family, was named a Notable Book of the Year by The New York Times. Baby of the Family was also on the African-America Best-seller List for Paperback Fiction. In October 2001, Baby of the Family was chosen by the Georgia Center for the Book as one of the "Top 25 books Every Georgian Should Read." The book was selected for the American Library Association Best Books for Young Adults in 1990, and won the 1989 Georgia Authors Series Award.

She instructed writing workshops at Spelman College, Emory University, and Coastal Georgia Community College. Ansa and her husband were adapting Baby of the Family for the screen in a feature film starring Alfre Woodard, Loretta Devine, Sheryl Lee Ralph, Vanessa A. Williams, Todd Bridges, Pam Grier.

In March 2007, Ansa launched an independent publishing company, DownSouth Press, with a focus on African-American literature. Her fifth novel, Taking After Mudear, was the lead title on DownSouth Press's first list in the fall of 2007.

== Personal life and death ==
Tina McElroy was born in Macon, Georgia on November 18, 1949, to Walter J. and Nellie McElroy. She grew up in the Pleasant Hill neighborhood. Ansa graduated from Spelman College and was married to Jonée Ansa, a filmmaker, for 42 years. Ansa lived on St. Simons Island, Georgia where she wrote, edited and published through her DownSouth Press. She forged on with the Spirit of her beloved husband by her side.

Ansa died on September 10, 2024, at the age of 74. She is buried at Westview Cemetery.

== Bibliography ==
- Baby of the Family (San Diego: Harcourt Brace Jovanovich, 1989. ISBN 0-15-610150-5)
- Ugly Ways (San Diego: Harcourt Brace Co., 1995. ISBN 0-15-600077-6)
- The Hand I Fan With (New York: Doubleday, 1998. ISBN 0-385-47601-9)
- You Know Better (New York: William Morrow, 2002. ISBN 0-06-019779-X)
- "Rachel" in Mending the World: Stories of Family by Contemporary Black Writers, Rosemarie Robotham, editor (New York: BasicCivitas Books, 2003. ISBN 0-465-07062-0)
