= Laurent DeGive =

19th-century Belgian-American businessman and philanthropist

Laurent DeGive (January 1828 in Belgium – March 17, 1910 in Rockledge, FL) was the Belgian consul in Atlanta, Georgia in the late 19th century. He arrived in Atlanta in 1859. He built two opera houses in Atlanta, DeGive's Opera House (Bijou Theater), and DeGive's Grand Opera House, which would later become Loew's Grand Theatre, where Gone with the Wind premiered.

DeGive helped organize the Gate City Street Railroad Company in 1881 together with L. B. Wilson, A. M. Reinhardt and John Stephens. In 1884 they built a line which started at the Kimball House and went via Pryor, Wheat and Jackson Streets to Ponce de Leon Springs. The line operated until January 1887, when it was sold.

DeGive is buried at Westview Cemetery in Atlanta, GA.

== See also ==
- DeGive's Opera House
- DeGive's Grand Opera House
