= Medical Association of Georgia =

The Medical Association of Georgia (MAG) is an organization in Georgia that advocates for physicians in the state. Established in 1849, it is an affiliate of the American Medical Association, and it has over 7,800 members. Since 1911, the MAG has published a quarterly journal, the Journal of the Medical Association of Georgia.

The MAG conducts regular annual sessions where the officers, members and delegates meet over several days. Between 1880 and 1910, most of these sessions were held in Atlanta, Augusta and Macon.
