= Henrietta Stanley Dull =

American cook and food writer

- Born: Henrietta Celestia Stanley; December 7, 1863; Stanley Mill, Laurens County, Georgia, United States
- Died: January 29, 1964 (aged 100); Atlanta, Georgia
- Burial place: Westview Cemetery
- Occupations: Cook, food writer
- Spouse: Samuel Rice Dull (married 1887–1919)

Henrietta Stanley Dull (December 7, 1863 – January 29, 1964) was an American cook and food writer. She was a respected authority on the cuisine of the Southern United States, and her 1928 book Southern Cooking is regarded as a definitive work on the subject.

In 2013 she was inducted into the Georgia Women of Achievement Hall of Fame.

== Biography ==
Henrietta Stanley, nicknamed "Hennie", was born in Stanley Mill, Laurens County, Georgia in 1863, to parents Ira Eli and Mary Mourning Elizabeth Breazeal Stanley. She married Virginian Samuel Rice Dull on June 15, 1887, and the couple settled in Atlanta. When her husband became seriously ill in the early 1900s, Henrietta began selling homemade food to support their family. She later reflected,

Suddenly I found I had to be the breadwinner. I knew how to make good things to eat ... I mastered a gas range. I made it work for me and talk for me.

Dull's cooking proved so popular that she was able to build a successful catering business. She gave cooking lectures and classes, and companies such as Atlanta Gas Light, Macy's, and White Lily Flour began hiring her to endorse and demonstrate their products.

In 1920, assisted by a young Margaret Mitchell, Dull began writing a weekly column named "Mrs. Dull's Cooking Lessons" for the Atlanta Journal. Published until 1945, this contained illustrated recipes, advice, and correspondence with readers.

Dull died at age 100 at a private hospital in Atlanta on January 29, 1964. She was buried at Westview Cemetery.

== Southern Cooking ==
Writing as "Mrs. S. R. Dull", Henrietta Stanley Dull compiled 1,300 recipes into the influential cookbook Southern Cooking, first published in 1928. This introduced Southern cuisine to a wider audience throughout the United States, and adapted traditional recipes for preparation with modern gas and electric appliances. Dull's writing style was terse and emphasized pragmatism.

This is the day of efficiency, and the woman who admits she can never get through the kitchen is a thing of the past. In order to be efficient, she must know how to manage.

Dull included several new recipes and revisions in a 1941 edition of Southern Cooking. This and the original have remained in print sporadically since Dull's death.

== See also ==
- What Mrs. Fisher Knows About Old Southern Cooking
