= Loew's Grand Theatre =

Theatre in Atlanta, Georgia (1893-1978)

- Interactive map of Loew's Grand Theatre
- Address: Peachtree & Forsyth Streets; Atlanta
- Owner: Loew's Theatres

Construction
- Opened: 1893
- Demolished: 1978
- Years active: 1893-1978
- Degive's Grand Opera House
- Formerly listed on the U.S. National Register of Historic Places
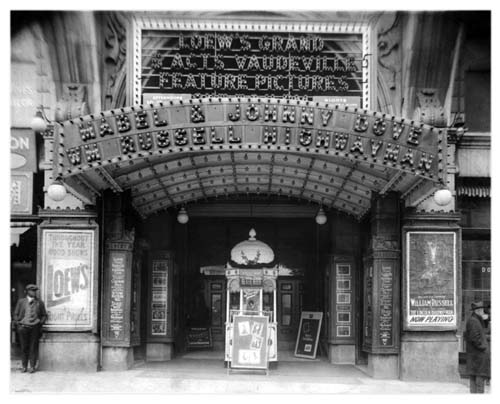
- Loew's Grand Theater ca. 1920

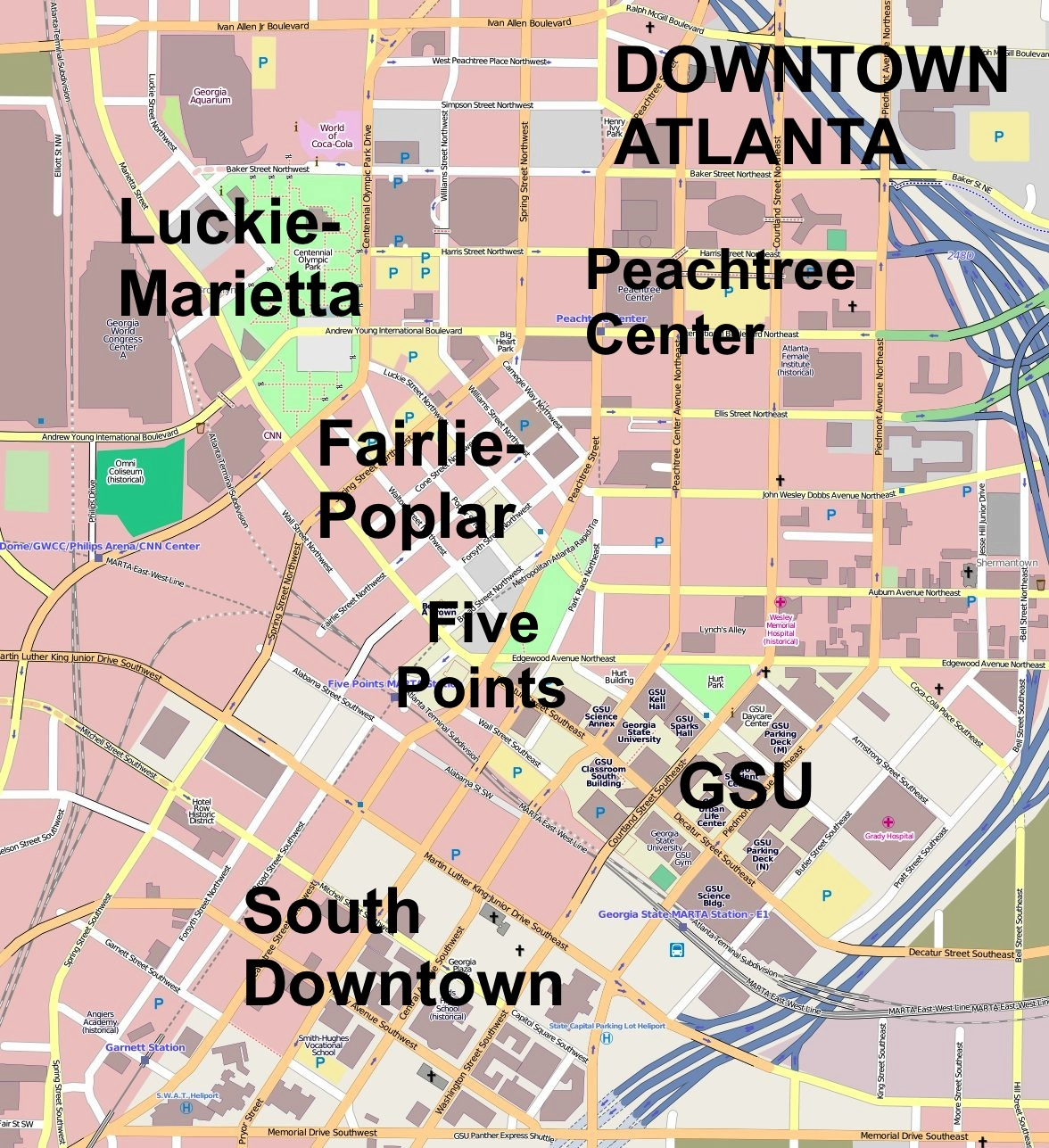
- Location within Downtown Atlanta
- Location: 157 Peachtree St., NE, Atlanta, Georgia, United States
- Coordinates: 33°45′27″N 84°23′13″W
- Area: less than one acre
- Built: 1931
- Architect: Nixon & Lindsey, Thomas W. Lamb (1931 interior remodel)
- Architectural style: Romanesque
- NRHP reference No.: 77000427

Significant dates
- Added to NRHP: June 17, 1977
- Removed from NRHP: May 29, 2026

Loew's Grand Theater, originally DeGive's Grand Opera House, was a movie theater at the corner of Peachtree and Forsyth Streets in downtown Atlanta, Georgia, United States. It was most famous as the site of the 1939 premiere of Gone with the Wind, which was attended by most of the stars of the film.

It concentrated on showing films made or released by Metro-Goldwyn-Mayer (MGM), a Loews-owned studio, even boasting a sign under its marquee proclaiming it "The Home of Metro-Goldwyn-Mayer Pictures". Although the United States v. Paramount Pictures, Inc. case divested studios of ownership of theater chains in 1948, many MGM films made afterward still had their first showings in Atlanta at this theater, including Singin' in the Rain, the 1959 Ben-Hur and Doctor Zhivago.

The theater was built as DeGive's Grand Opera House in 1893 by entrepreneur and Belgian consul Laurent DeGive, and hosted many concerts and touring opera productions. It is often confused with DeGive's first opera house, which opened in 1870 four blocks south, at the corner of Marietta and Forsyth streets. The confusion is understandable, as DeGive had his name carved prominently above the entrance of the Grand Theater.

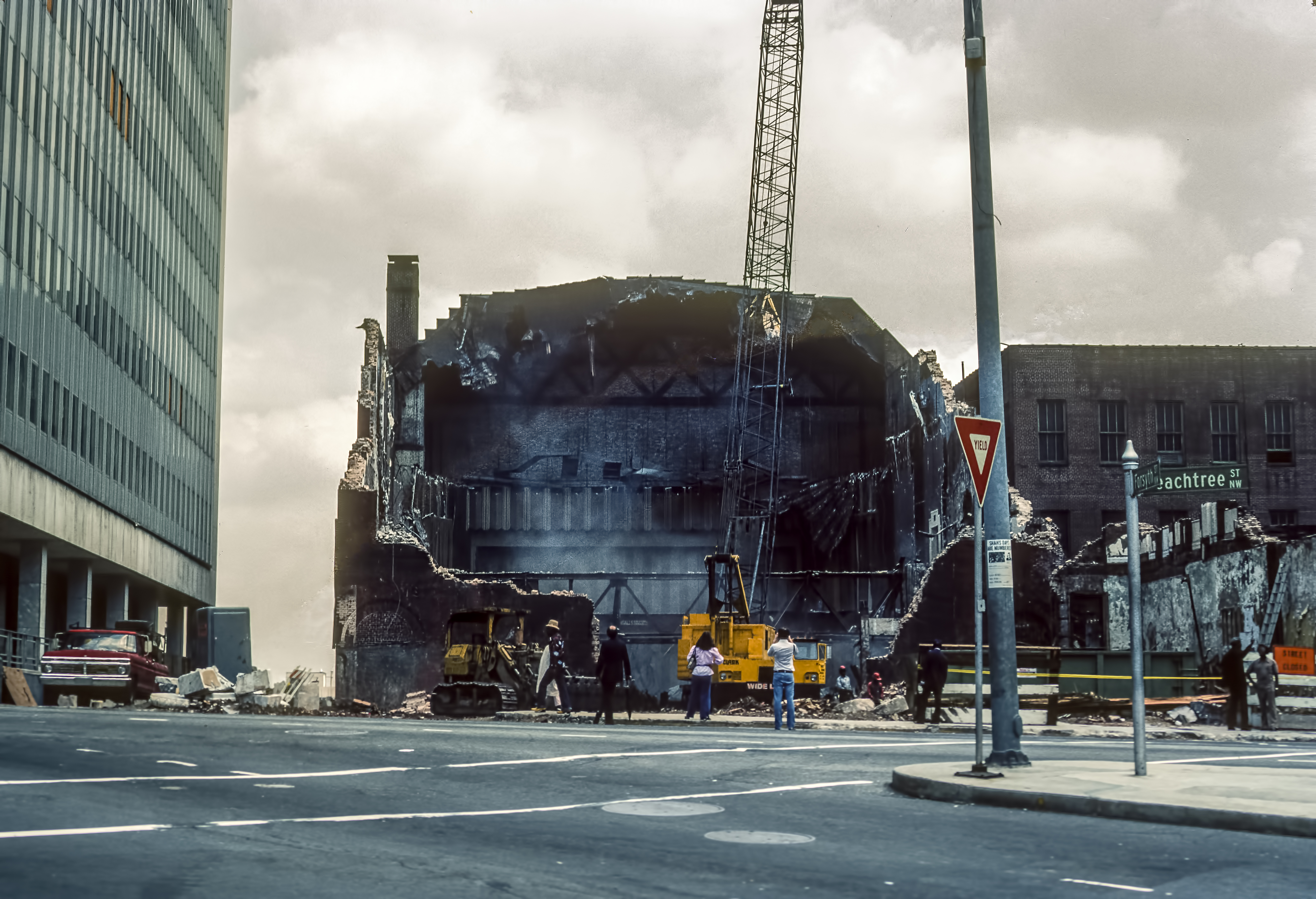
The wreckage of the Loew's Grand being demolished after the fire in 1978

The Grand was bought by the Loews organization in 1927 and renovated into a movie theater by architect Thomas W. Lamb. The one-screen theater had 2,088 seats. It was extensively damaged as the result of a fire on January 30, 1978. Although the real estate where the theater had stood was of high value, the theater could not be demolished because of its historic status. This led many to speculate that the cause of the fire was arson, although this speculation has never been proven. The Georgia-Pacific Tower was built on the former site of the theater.

Bricks from the building were recycled and used to build a popular Atlanta restaurant, Houston's which features a plaque of remembrance of the theater in the waiting area of its original location five miles north, at 2166 Peachtree. A chandelier from the building now hangs prominently at the center of the Tabernacle, a church turned concert venue in Atlanta.
