= Kerlungner =

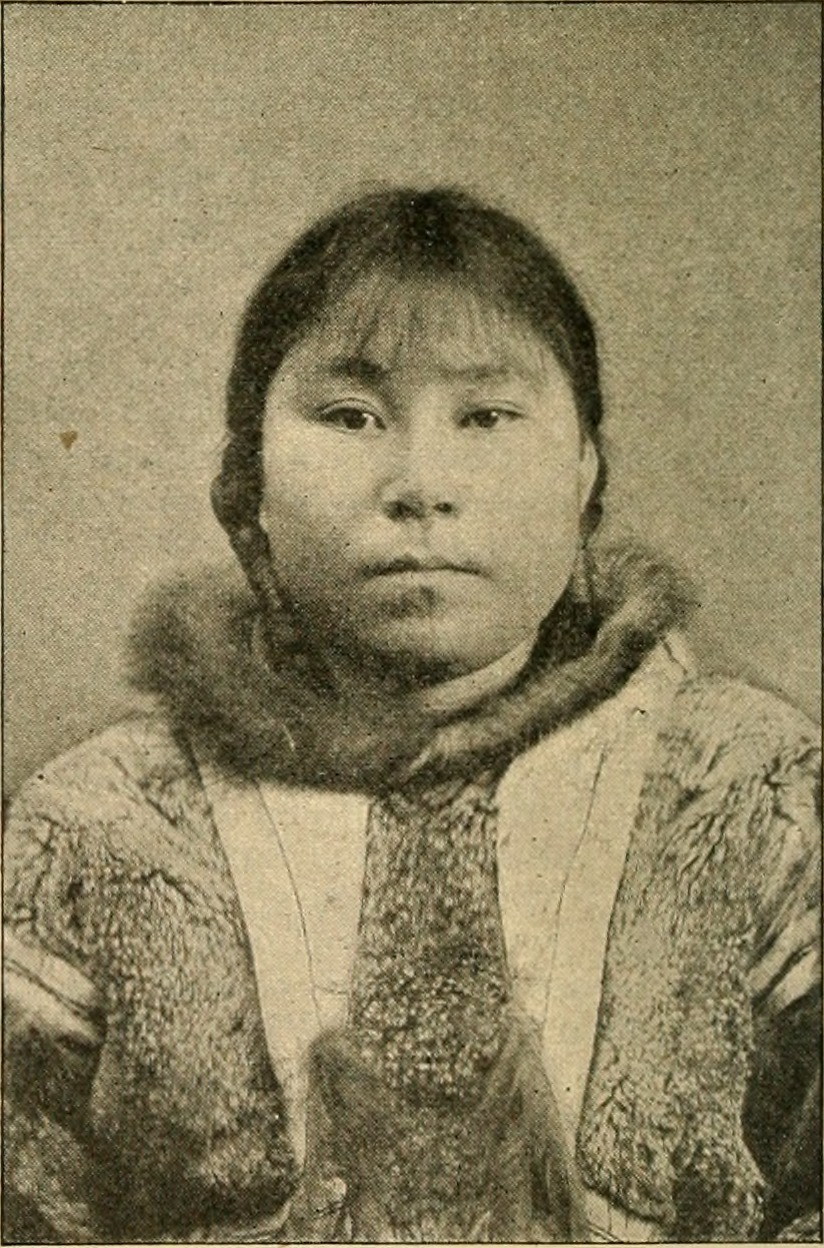
- Kerlungner, photographed by William Dinwiddie in 1894, from a 1901 publication.

Kerlungner (born about 1877), also written as Ker-Lung-Ner, was an Alaska Native woman who toured the United States as part of Miner W. Bruce's "Eskimo Troupe" in the 1890s.

== Early life ==
Kerlungner is variously described in contemporary sources as belonging to the Kinugumiut (Kiŋikmiut) or Kumu-Gu-Mut cultural group, based near Port Clarence, Alaska.

== Touring, 1893-1896 ==
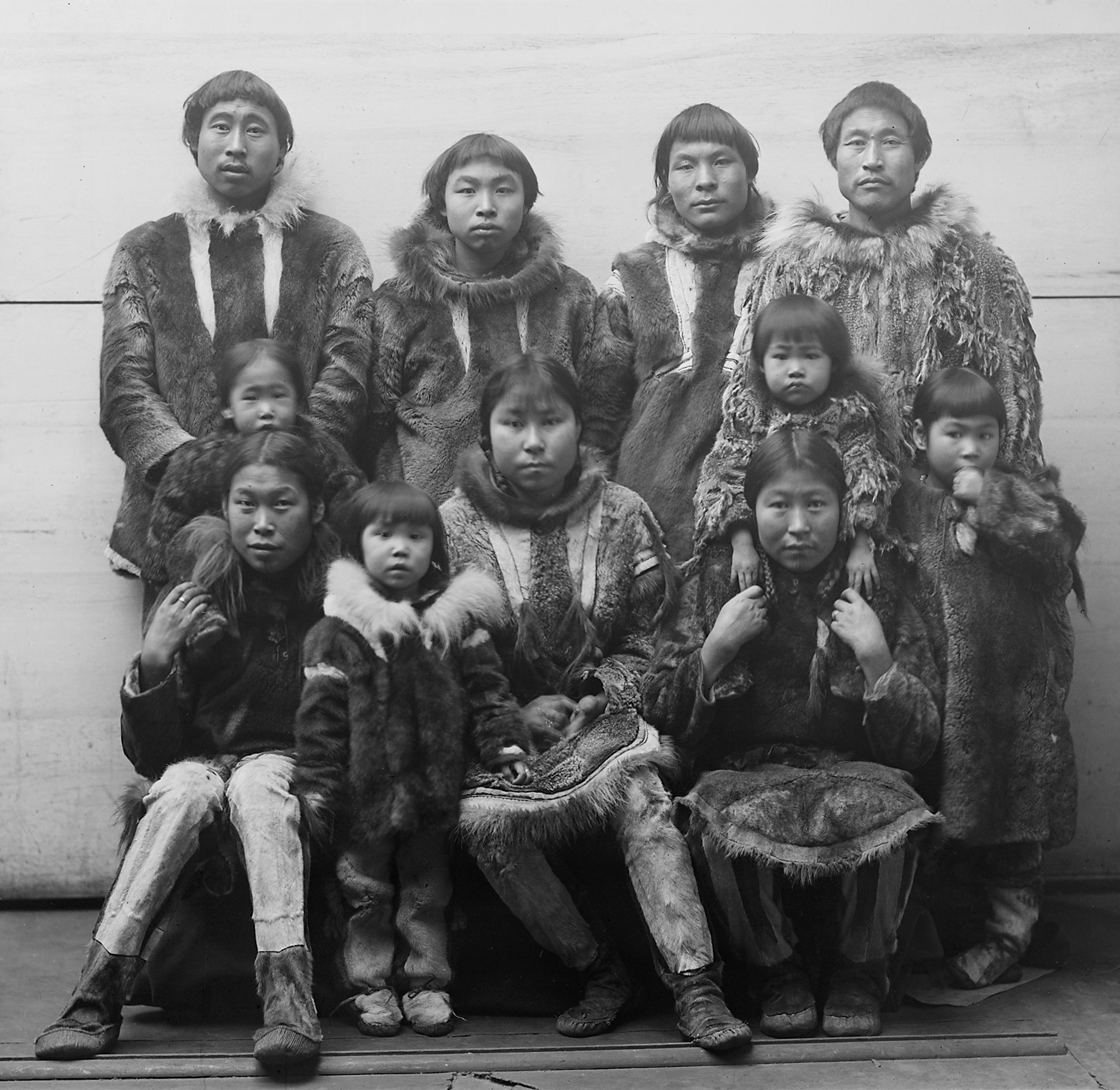
The group of eleven Alaska Native people who toured the United States with Miner W. Bruce in the 1890s, photographed by William Dinwiddie in 1894. Kerlungner is the woman seated at the center of this grouping.

Kerlungner was photographed with other members of her community in 1894, by American ethnographer William Dinwiddie. She was among the Alaska Native people who toured American cities with entrepreneur Miner Wait Bruce's "Eskimo Troupe" from 1893 to 1896. The tour was a publicity effort supporting Bruce's business plan, importing and breeding Siberian reindeer in Alaska. Bruce had no particular authority or expertise to travel with the group, or to arrange their appearances at various exhibitions, schools, and other gatherings. They were presented in exploitative ways, and their health and safety were jeopardized more than once. (During these same years, Miner W. Bruce assembled a large collection of Alaska Native artifacts, hundreds of which he sold to the Field Museum of Natural History in Chicago in 1894 and in 1896.)

The troupe of three men, four women, and three children appeared at the World's Columbian Exposition in Chicago in 1893, at the Cotton States and International Exposition in Atlanta in 1895, and were welcomed at the White House by president Grover Cleveland. Kerlungner was billed as an "Alaskan Princess", the young beauty of the group. "The 'princess' is really quite a pretty girl, with rosy cheeks and superlatively white teeth," commented one report in 1894. She displayed her traditional clothing and cookery, danced, and participated in chants and drumming for curious audiences. Her "small and shapely" hands and feet were also measured and admired.

Kerlungner married her fellow performer, Iser-Kyner, without legal papers or family involvement, and possibly only for publicity, at a ceremony on the midway during the Cotton States and International Exposition in 1894. On their trip home in 1896, Kerlungner was struck in the head by the ship's rigging and hurt, but recovered by the time the schooner landed at Unalaska. Her mother died in 1897, as noted in a government report from the nearby reindeer station.

In 1915, the Smithsonian Institution's Bureau of Ethnology exhibited photographs of Kerlungner at the Panama–Pacific International Exposition in San Francisco.
