= Beacon =

Device used to attract attention

A beacon is an intentionally conspicuous device designed to attract attention to a specific location. A common example is the lighthouse, which draws attention to a fixed point that can be used to navigate around obstacles or into port. More modern examples include a variety of radio beacons that can be read on radio direction finders in all weather, and radar transponders that appear on radar displays.

Beacons can also be combined with semaphoric or other indicators to provide important information, such as the status of an airport, by the colour and rotational pattern of its airport beacon, or of pending weather as indicated on a weather beacon mounted at the top of a tall building or similar site. When used in such fashion, beacons can be considered a form of optical telegraphy.

== For navigation ==
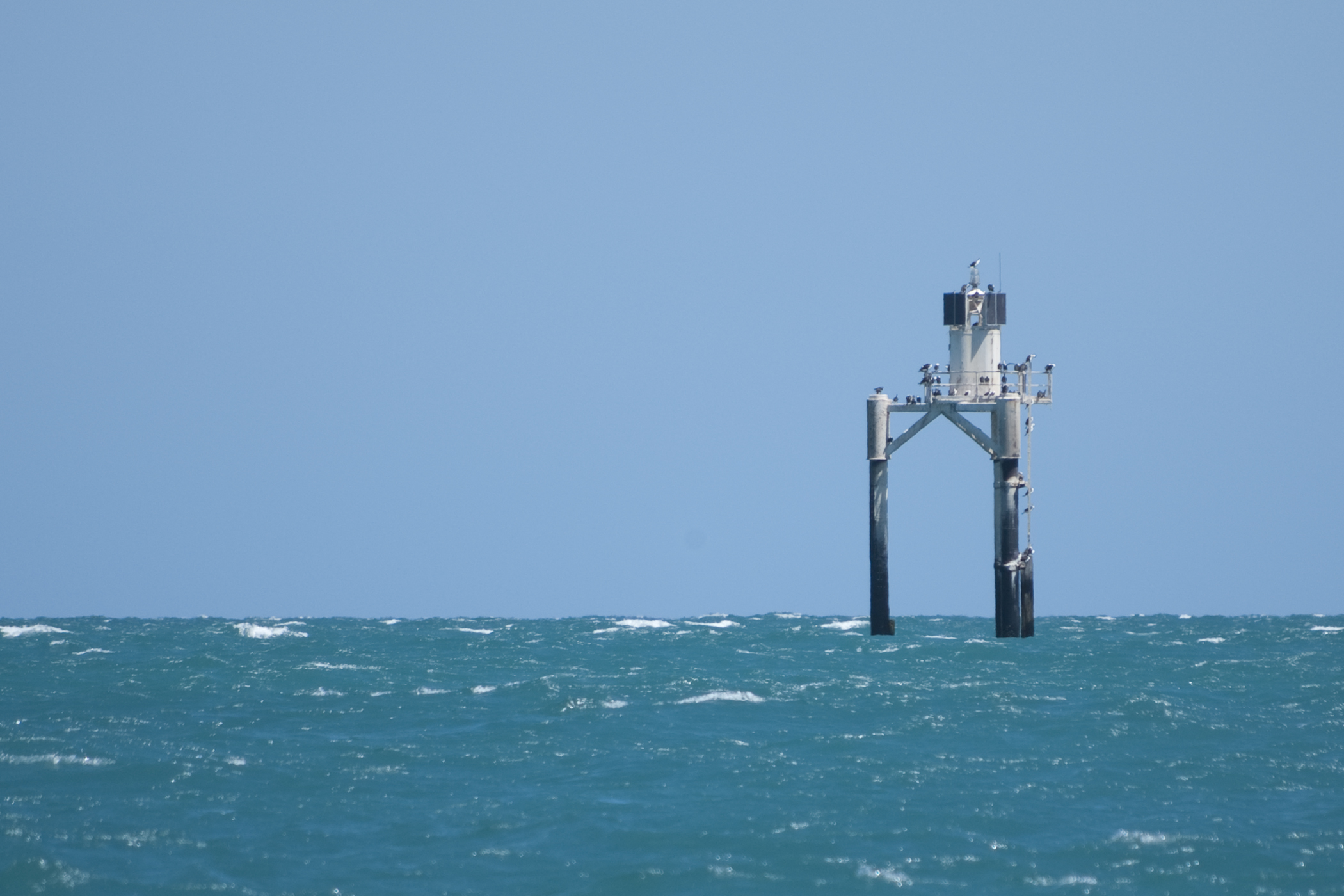
A navigational beacon denoting the presence of Orontes Bank off Port Vincent, South Australia.

Beacons help guide navigators to their destinations. Types of navigational beacons include radar reflectors, radio beacons, sonic and visual signals. Visual beacons range from small, single-pile structures to large lighthouses or light stations and can be located on land or on water. Lighted beacons are called lights; unlighted beacons are called daybeacons. Aerodrome beacons are used to indicate locations of airports and helipads.

In the United States, a series of beacons were constructed across the country in the 1920s and 1930s to help guide pilots delivering air mail. They were placed about 25 miles apart from each other, and included large concrete arrows with accompanying lights to illuminate them.

Handheld beacons are also employed in aircraft marshalling, and are used by the marshal to deliver instructions to the crew of aircraft as they move around an active airport, heliport or aircraft carrier.

== For defensive communications (historical) ==
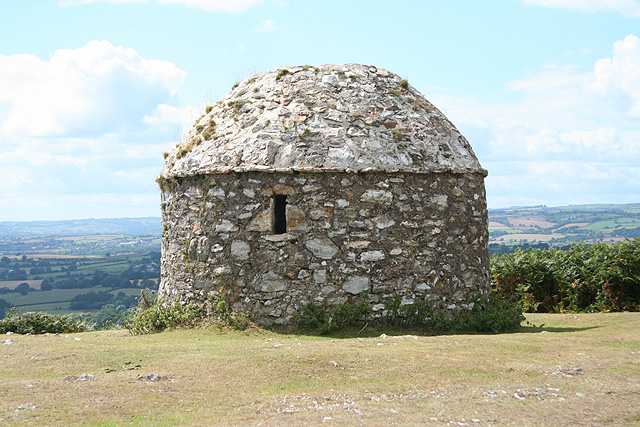
16th-century beacon hut in Culmstock, Devon, England

Historically, beacons were fires lit at well-known locations on hills or high places, used either as lighthouses for navigation at sea, or for signalling over land that enemy troops were approaching, in order to alert defenses. As signals, beacons are an ancient form of optical telegraph and were part of a relay league.

Systems of this kind have existed for centuries over much of the world. The ancient Greeks called them phryctoriae, while beacons figure on several occasions on the column of Trajan.

In imperial China, sentinels on and near the Great Wall of China used a sophisticated system of daytime smoke and nighttime flame to send signals along long chains of beacon towers.

Legend has it that King You of Zhou played a trick multiple times in order to amuse his often melancholy concubine, ordering beacon towers lit to fool his vassals and soldiers. But when enemies, led by the Marquess of Shen really arrived at the wall, although the towers were lit, no defenders came, leading to King Yōu's death and the collapse of the Western Zhou dynasty. However, in reality the Great Wall did not exist until long after King You's death.

Thucydides wrote that during the Peloponnesian War, the Peloponnesians who were in Corcyra were informed by night-time beacon signals of the approach of sixty Athenian vessels from Lefkada.

In the 9th century, during the Arab–Byzantine wars, the Byzantine Empire used a beacon system to transmit messages from the border with the Abbasid Caliphate, across Anatolia to the imperial palace in the Byzantine capital, Constantinople. It was devised by Leo the Mathematician for Emperor Theophilos, but either abolished or radically curtailed by Theophilos' son and successor, Michael III. This system was notable for being able to send different messages. To do this it used synchronized clocks and the knowledge of the longitudinal difference between the first and last stations. The practical efficacy of this system has been challenged, and although it probably functioned it was also a prestige technology in part of Abbasid-Byzantine intellectual competition.

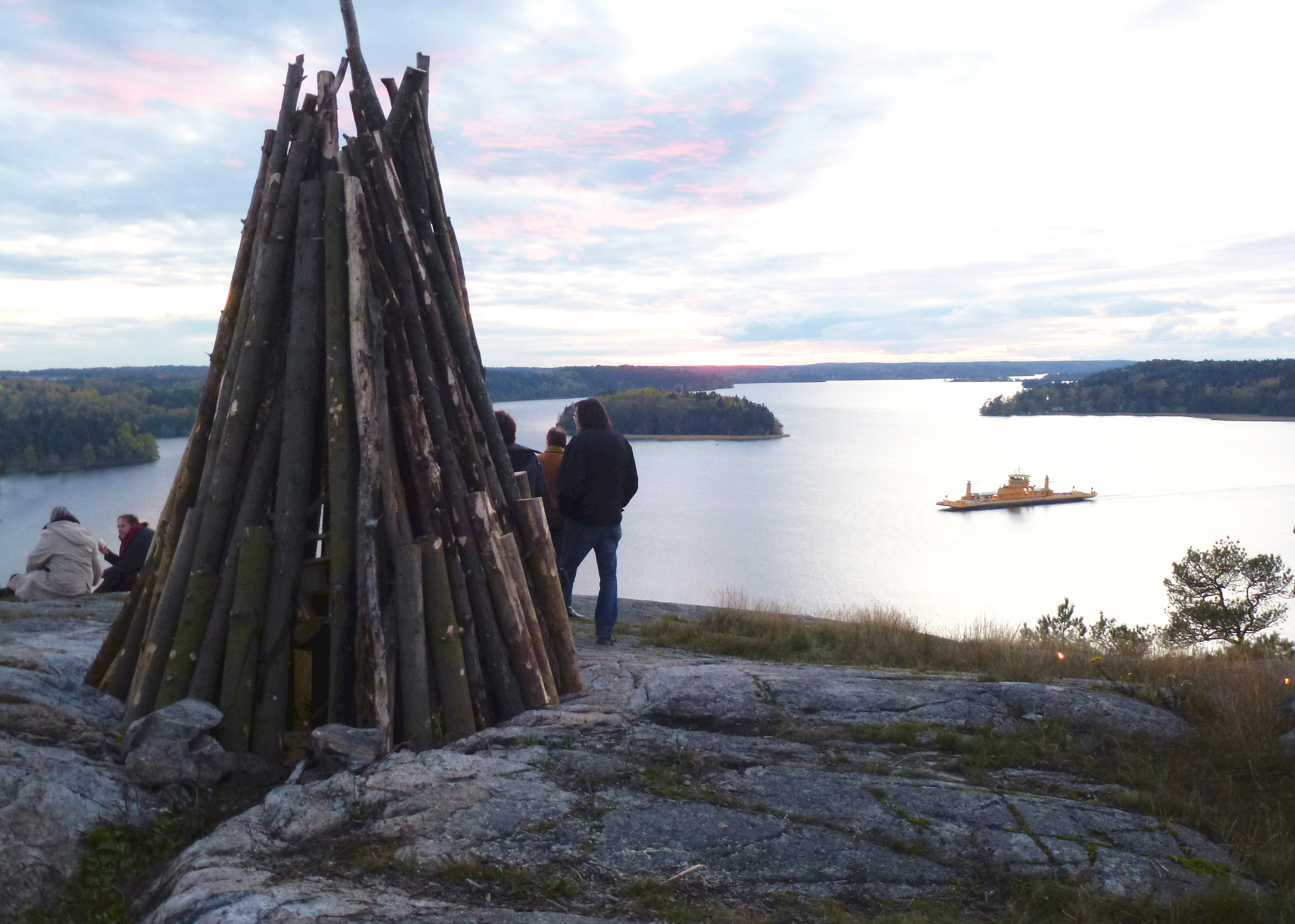
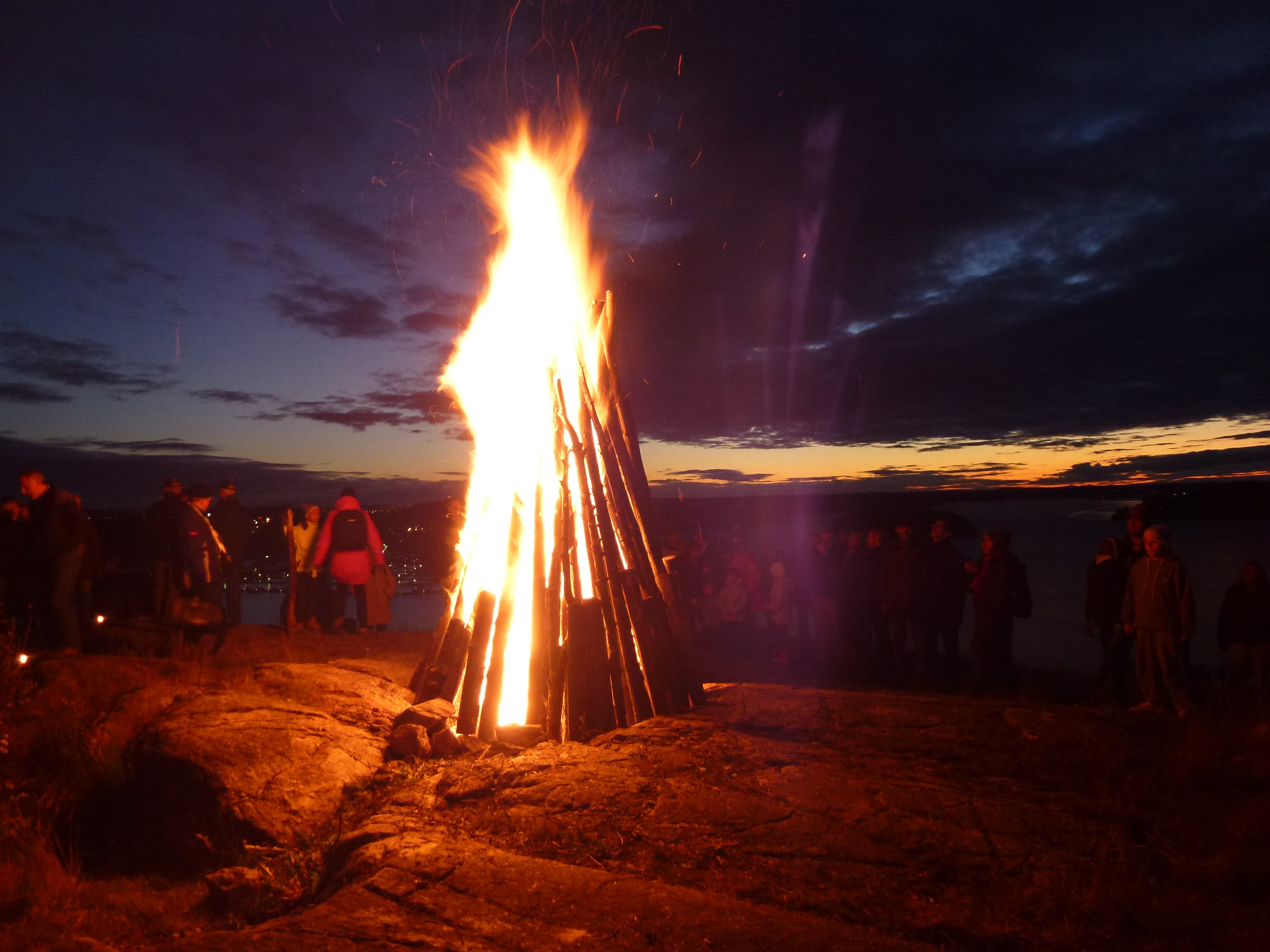
A Beacon in Sweden before and after being lit

In the Nordic countries, hill forts and beacon networks were important for warning against invasions. In Sweden and Finland, these beacons, known as vårdkasar or bötar, formed an extensive coastal warning system from the Late Iron Age and through the Middle Ages. Beacons were strategically placed on high ground for visibility, constructed from tar-rich wood to ensure bright flames. They were mentioned in medieval laws like Upplandslagen and described by Swedish writer Olaus Magnus in 1555 as tools for mobilising armed defenders during crises. In Finland, similar beacons called vainovalkeat ("persecution fires") or vartiotulet ("guard fires") warned settlements of raids.

In Wales, the Brecon Beacons were named for beacons used to warn of approaching English raiders. In England, the most famous examples are the beacons used in Elizabethan England to warn of the approaching Spanish Armada. Many hills in England were named Beacon Hill (or Beacon Fell) after such beacons, including Beacon Fell, Cumbria and Beacon Fell, Lancashire. In England the authority to erect beacons originally lay with the King and later was delegated to the Lord High Admiral. The money due for the maintenance of beacons was called Beaconagium and was levied by the sheriff of each county. In the Scottish borders country, a system of beacon fires was at one time established to warn of incursions by the English. Hume and Eggerstone castles and Soltra Edge were part of this network.

In Spain, the border of Granada in the territory of the Crown of Castile had a complex beacon network to warn against Moorish raiders and military campaigns. Due to the progressive advance of the borders throughout the process of the Reconquista, the entire Spanish geography is full of defensive lines of castles, towers and fortifications, visually connected to each other, which served as fortified beacons. Some examples are the Route of the Vinalopó castles or the distribution of the castles in Jaén.

=== Ceremonial use ===
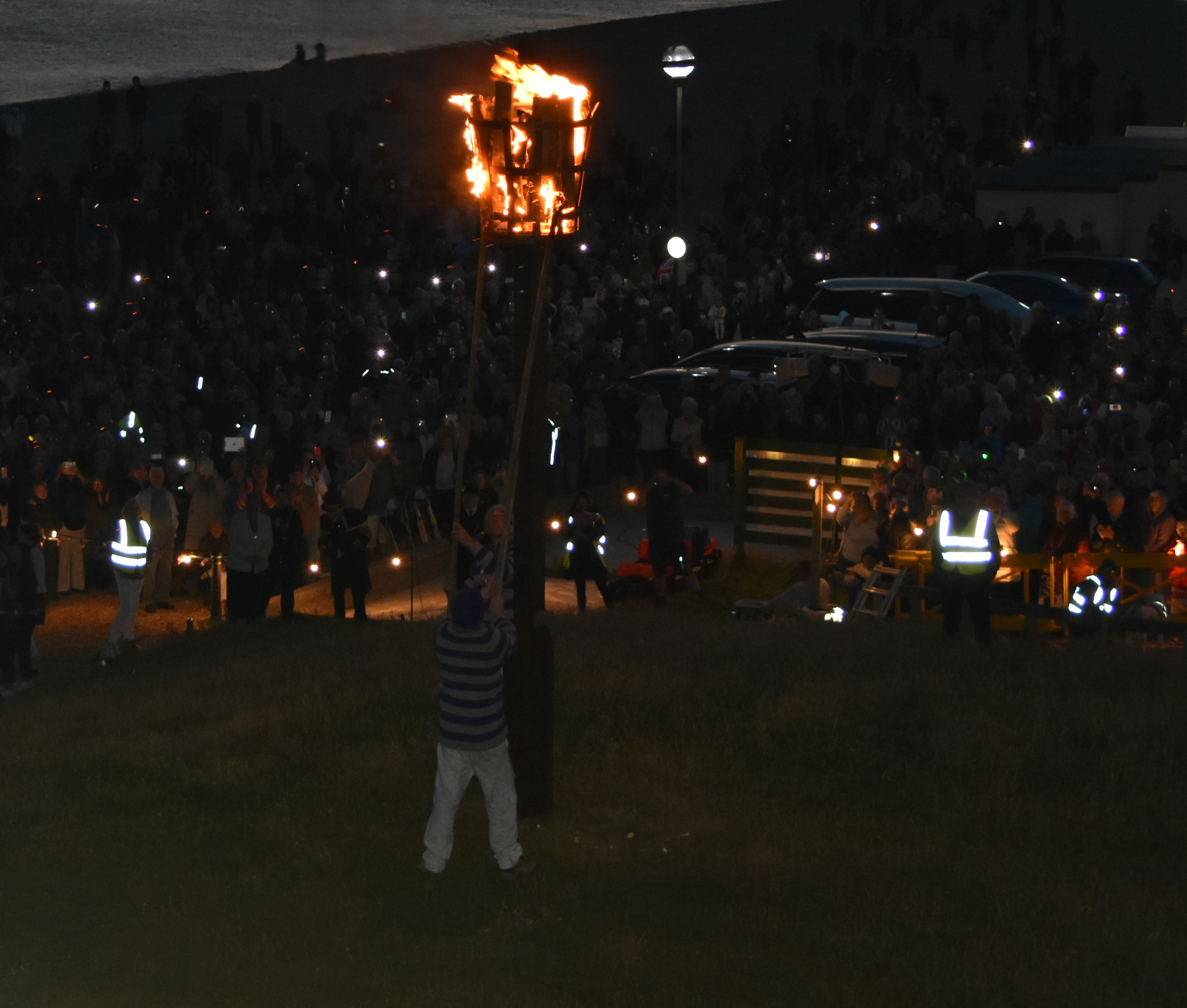
The Platinum Jubilee Beacon at Seaford, East Sussex in June 2022.

In later centuries, advancements in technology, such as the telegraph, rendered beacon systems obsolete for rapid communication. The use of such beacons transitioned from practical communication to symbolic and ceremonial roles, where the lighting of beacons was repurposed to mark significant national events.

Beacons were lit across the United Kingdom to celebrate Queen Victoria's Diamond Jubilee in 1897, Queen Elizabeth II's Platinum Jubilee in 2022, and to commemorate events such as the 70th anniversary of VE Day, and the 80th anniversary of the D-Day landings in 2024.

South Korea maintains a daily ceremonial beacon lighting at Namsan Beacon Mound in Seoul, where visitors witness a reenactment of the traditional bongsu ceremony, which historically signaled emergencies.

== Military use (20th–21st century) ==
=== Infrared marker ===
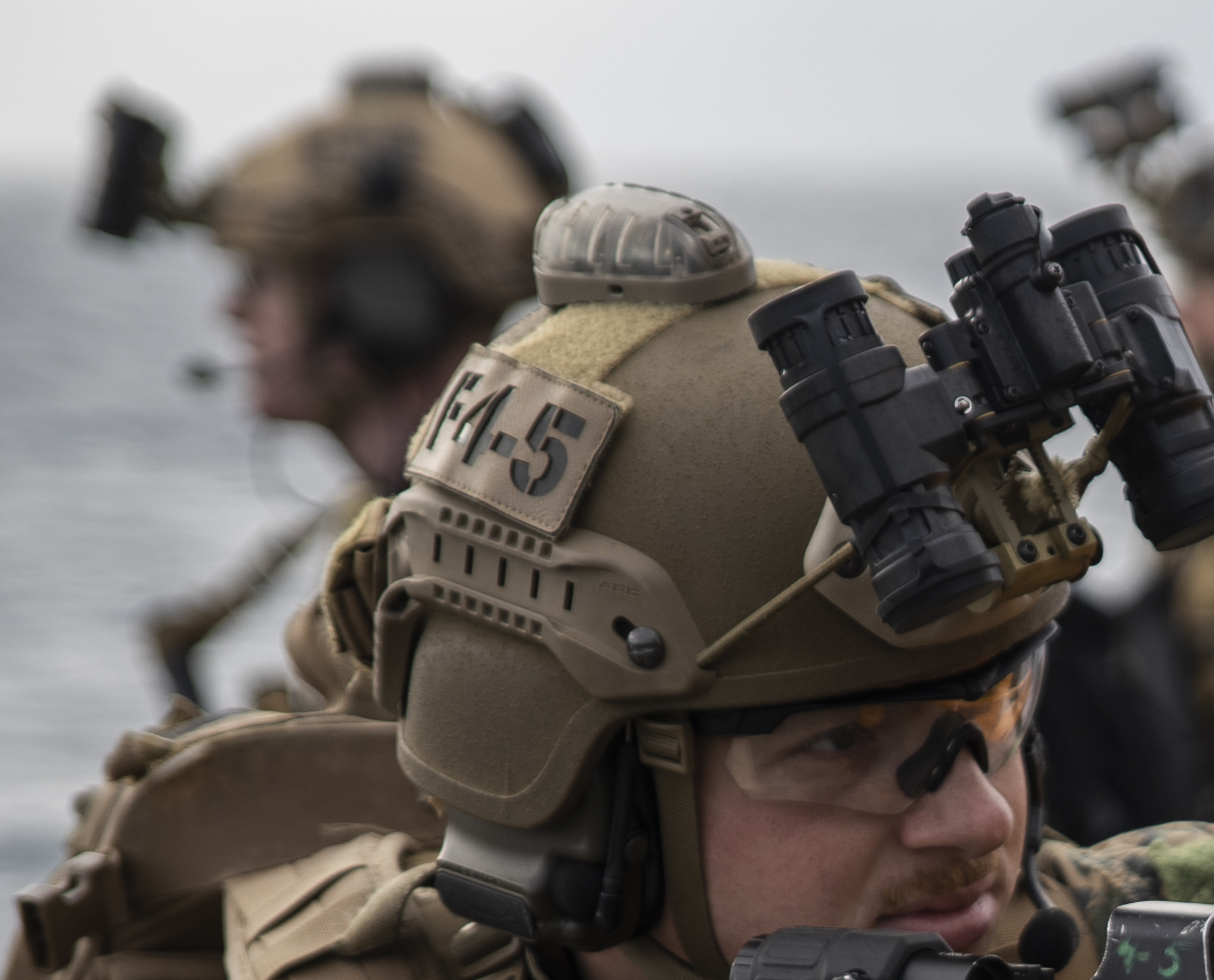
A CORE Survival HEL-STAR 6 IR strobe mounted atop this marine's helmet

Infrared strobes and other infrared beacons have increasingly been used in modern combat when operating at night as they can only be seen through night vision goggles. As a result, they are often used to mark friendly positions as a form of IFF to prevent friendly fire and improve coordination. Soldiers will typically affix them to their helmets or other gear so they are easily visible to others using night vision including other infantry, ground vehicles, and aerial platforms (drones, helicopters, planes, etc.).

Passive markers include IR patches, which reflect infrared light, and chemlights. The earliest such beacons were often IR chemlights taped to helmets.

As time went on, more sophisticated options began to emerge with electronically powered infrared strobes with specific mounting solutions for attaching to helmets or load bearing equipment. These strobes may have settings which allow constant on or strobes of IR light, hence the name.

Advancements in near-peer technology, however, present risk since if friendly units can see the strobe with night vision so could enemies with night vision capabilities. As a result, some in the American military have stressed that efforts should be made to improve training regarding light discipline (IR and visible) and other means of reducing a unit's visible signature.

== On vehicles ==
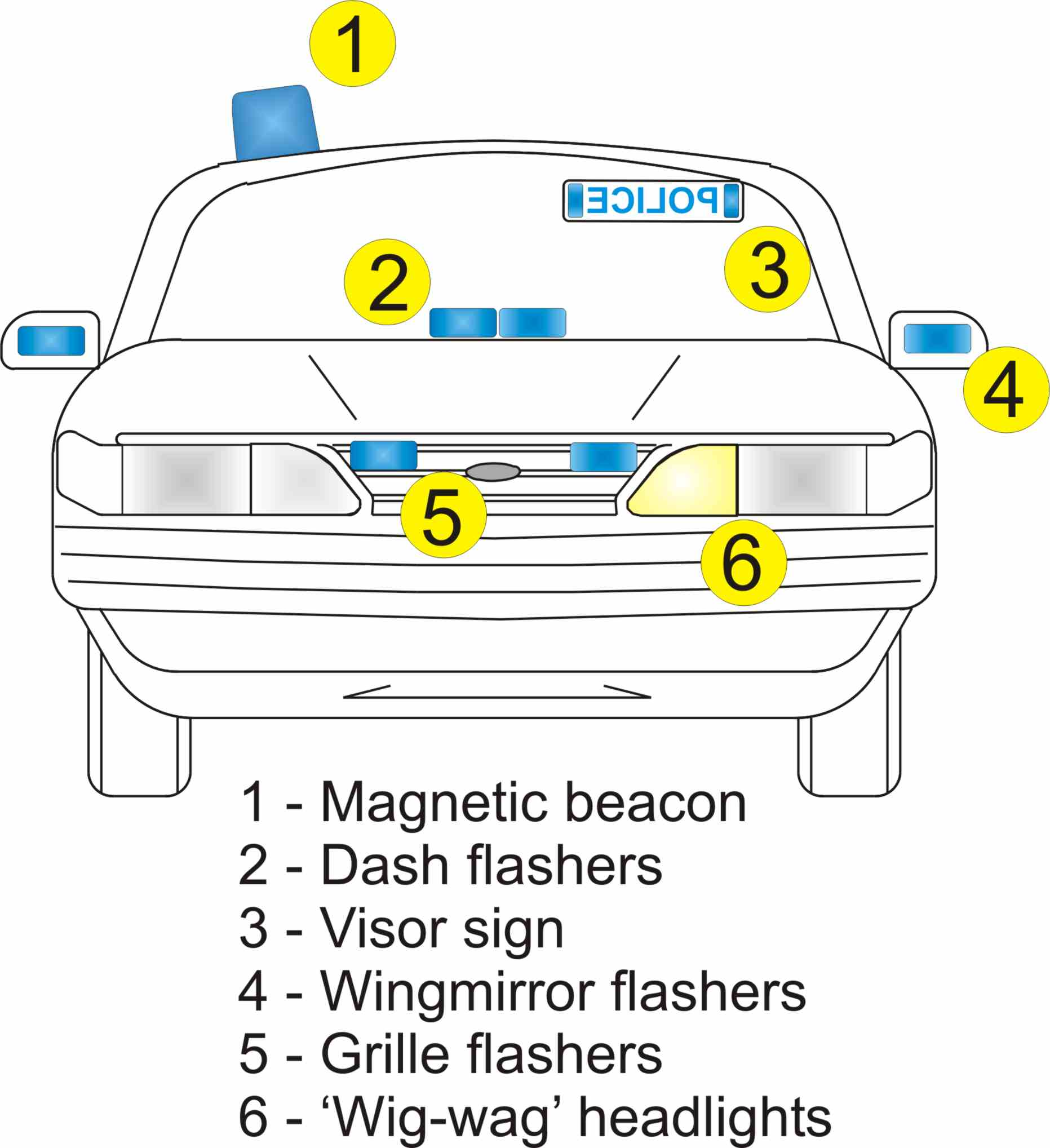
Beacon positions on police car

Vehicular beacons are rotating or flashing lights affixed to the top of a vehicle to attract the attention of surrounding vehicles and pedestrians. Emergency vehicles such as fire engines, ambulances, police cars, tow trucks, construction vehicles, and snow-removal vehicles carry beacon lights.

The color of the lamps varies by jurisdiction; typical colors are blue and/or red for police, fire, and medical-emergency vehicles; amber for hazards (slow-moving vehicles, wide loads, tow trucks, security personnel, construction vehicles, etc.); green for volunteer firefighters or for medical personnel, and violet for funerary vehicles. Beacons may be constructed with halogen bulbs similar to those used in vehicle headlamps, xenon flashtubes, or LEDs. Incandescent and xenon light sources require the vehicle's engine to continue running to ensure that the battery is not depleted when the lights are used for a prolonged period. The low power consumption of LEDs allows the vehicle's engine to remain turned off while the lights operate.

== Other uses ==
In wireless networks, a beacon is a type of frame which is sent by the access point (or WiFi router) to indicate that it is on.

Bluetooth beacons periodically send out a data packet that can be used by software to identify the beacon location. This is typically used by indoor navigation and positioning applications, and has potential uses in marketing.

Beaconing is the process that allows a network to self-repair network problems. The stations on the network notify the other stations on the ring when they are not receiving the transmissions. Beaconing is used in Token ring and FDDI networks.

Emergency locator beacons can help locate vehicles and persons during and after emergency situations.

Infrared beacons are the key infrastructure for the Universal Traffic Management System (UTMS) in Japan. They perform two-way communication with travelling vehicles based on highly directional infrared communication technology and have a vehicle detecting capability to provide more accurate traffic information.

In amateur radio:

Radio propagation beacons are used by certain amateur radio operators and organizations for measuring propagation of radio waves. These beacon stations are installed at fixed locations, and transmit regularly on specific radio frequencies. The signals from these beacons can then be received by other amateur radio stations in order to determine the feasibility of communication with other regions.

== See also ==
- Aerodrome beacon
- Beacon mode service
- Beacon School
- Belisha beacon
- Emergency locator beacon
- Emergency position-indicating radiobeacon station (ELTs, PLBs & EPIRBs)
- iBeacon
- Lantern
- Leading lights
- Lighthouse of Alexandria
- Milestone/Kilometric point
- Polaris
- Signal
- Strobe beacon
- Time ball
- Trail blazing
- Warning light (disambiguation)
- Weather beacon
- Web beacon
