= Vote.org =

American non-profit voter advocacy organization

- Formation: April 2008; 18 years ago
- Founder: Debra Cleaver
- Type: 501(c)(3)
- Legal status: Active
- Headquarters: Oakland, California, U.S.
- Region served: United States
- CEO: Andrea Hailey
- Website: vote.org

Vote.org, formerly Long Distance Voter, is a nonpartisan 501(c)(3) non-profit organization that is based in the United States. It provides online voter guides for every state, including voter registration forms, absentee ballot applications, and information on deadlines, directions, and ID and residency requirements. It has earned Candid's (formerly GuideStar's) Gold Transparency Seal.

== History ==
Vote.org was founded by Debra Cleaver in 2008. The organization was named Long Distance Voter at the time, and sought to increase voter turnout by providing greater access to absentee voting information online. The organization was volunteer-run and did not have any full time staff from 2008-2016. Cleaver became the first full-time employee in January 2016.

Long Distance Voter relaunched as Vote.org in April 2016, and was accepted into Y Combinator in June 2016. The mission was updated to reflect a new goal of 100% voter turnout. During the Y Combinator demo day, Cleaver pitched the then-novel use of unsolicited text messages as a way of registering voters. In Fall 2016, Vote.org worked with Hustle to run a nationwide SMS peer-to-peer voter registration program in which they sent millions of text messages to unregistered voters. The program was then expanded to include polling place location information for registered voters. A quantitative evaluation of this program found that these messages increased turnout by 0.2 percentage points. Since then, Vote.org has run many experiments, primarily using randomized controlled trials (RCTs) measuring the effectiveness of voter turnout tactics and messaging.

In March 2018, Vote.org launched ElectionDay.org, a campaign that encouraged CEOs of large companies to voluntarily give their employees time off to vote on Election Day. As of 2020, over 1000 companies had opted to participate, including Twitter, T-Mobile, Lyft, and Adidas.

In June 2020, Vote.org, the Alliance for Retired Americans, and the American Civil Liberties Union of Maine filed suit against Maine. The lawsuit alleged that Maine's voting systems were inaccessible and out-of-date, thereby creating barriers to voting. The lawsuit highlighted a lack of voter registration options, a lack of prepaid postage on mail-in ballots, ballot collection hurdles, an Election Day receipt deadline, and rejection of absentee ballots that had technical defects. In September 2020, Superior Court judge William Stokes rejected the lawsuit, citing that the suit took place too close to the actual election and any changes to ballot deadlines would be to the detriment of the state's electoral process and cause disruptions to results. The Alliance of Retired Americans now seek to file an appeal to Maine's Supreme Judicial Court.

In 2020, Vote.org organized food trucks at polling places, and provided free meals to 40,500 voters who were waiting in long lines. Vote.org partnered with tech company Propel, developer of the Fresh EBT app, to register 60,000 low-income participants of the Supplemental Nutrition Assistance Program to register to vote before the 2020 election.

In 2021, Vote.org advocated for passing the For the People Act, a U.S. bill which expands automatic and same-day voter registration, voter access mail-in and online ballot infrastructure, and new limits on campaign spending. Fair Fight Action, When We All Vote, the Declaration for American Democracy, and Vote.org drafted a letter which was signed by 90 corporations; the letter urged Congress to pass the For the People Act. On March 3, 2021, the United States House of Representatives approved the For the People Act with a 220–210 vote. On June 22, the Senate voted 50–50 to continue debate on the bill, which means the act did not pass. Vote.org also worked with Fair Fight Action and When We All Vote to oppose changes in Georgia's voter ID laws.

Also in 2021, Vote.org partnered with the CW network and the Lawyers' Committee for Civil Rights under law to launch the Freedom to Vote nonpartisan initiative, which aimed to increase content promoting voter registration and civic participation on a number of different platforms. This is an expansion of the CW's and Vote.org previous Vote Actually campaign in 2020.

In 2023, the DOJ filed a statement of interest in a lawsuit challenging a Florida voter registration law that mandates people to sign their name with a wet signature, with physical pen and paper. Voting advocacy groups Vote.org, the Florida Alliance for Retired Americans and the Florida State Conference of the NAACP filed the lawsuit against Florida Secretary of State Cord Byrd and other state election officials.

In September 2023, Taylor Swift posted an Instagram message asking her 272 million followers to register to vote and linking to Vote.org. Vote.org reported more than 35,000 applications submitted on National Voter Registration Day, due in part to Swift’s superstar influence. For the partnership, Vote.org and Swift were awarded a Webby Award for Best Creator or Influencer Collaboration, Features (Social) in 2024.

On National Voter Registration Day 2024, more than 100 celebrities participated in a voter registration initiative led by Vote.org in partnership with Linktree. Public figures like Olivia Rodrigo, Stephen Curry, and Kerry Washington turned their Linktree profiles into "voter registration hubs," directing their social media followers to resources where they could check their voter registration status and learn about local registration requirements. The campaign resulted in over 150,000 new voter registrations, making it the most successful National Voter Registration Day in Vote.org's history.

== Controversies ==
In the summer of 2019, the organization's board terminated founder and CEO Debra Cleaver, citing "differences in opinion". This resulted in alleged losses in potential funding. Cleaver "even tried to leverage a potential donation, convincing a donor named Sage Weil to pledge $4 million to Vote.org" contingent on her reinstatement. Cleaver was replaced by board member Andrea Hailey.

In October 2019, Vote.org purchased billboards in Mississippi to encourage turnout in an upcoming election. The billboards had the wrong date due to a vendor printing error. The billboards were removed in fewer than 24 hours and although the vendor was responsible for the error, Vote.org then invested additional resources into Mississippi that cycle.

Founder Debra Cleaver filed a lawsuit against Vote.org in August 2022 alleging wrongful termination and a misappropriation of charitable funds. The lawsuit was dismissed with prejudice. In 2025, the organization filed a counter lawsuit against Debra Cleaver alleging defamation and trademark infringement, among other complaints. A Law.com article says that the executive Cleaver "took [hard feelings after getting fired] to another level by allegedly conducting “illegal smear campaigns,” impersonating their replacement, reporting Vote.org to multiple regulatory agencies and pitching “hit pieces” to Politico."

In May 2024, an investigative article in The Chronicle of Philanthropy, detailed a litany of ongoing issues at Vote.org including regulatory and compliance failures such as fundraising in states without a valid registration including New York in 2019 until November 2021 as required by New York State Law. Questionable financial decisions have also been alleged such as tax forms signed by a contractor, donations which were not recorded in financial statements according to an official audit of Vote.org in July 2021, and a lawsuit for disability discrimination. The lawsuit was dismissed less than six weeks after it was filed.
