= Fieler =

Fieler is a surname of English or German origin. Notable people with the surname include:

- Chase Fieler (born June 10, 1992), American basketball player
- Sean Fieler (born 1972 or 1973), American hedge fund manager and conservative donor
