= Relay (disambiguation) =

A relay is an electric switch operated by a signal in one circuit to control another circuit.

Relay may also refer to:

== Electrical engineering ==
- Protective relay, a device designed to trip a circuit breaker when a fault is detected.

== Historical ==
- Stage station, a place where exhausted horses being used for transport could be exchanged for fresh ones
- Cursus publicus, a courier service in the Roman Empire
- Relay league, a chain of message-forwarding stations

== Computer networking ==
- BITNET Relay, a 1980s online chat system
- Mail relay, a server used for forwarding e-mail
  - Open mail relay, such a server that can be used by anyone

== Other telecommunication ==
- Relay (satellite)
- Broadcast relay station, a transmitter which repeats or transponds the signal of another
- Microwave radio relay
- Relay channel, in information theory, a communications probability modeling system
- Telecommunications Relay Service, a telephone accessibility service for the deaf
- Repeater, an electronic device that receives and retransmits a signal

== Automobiles ==
- Citroën Relay, a marketing name for the Fiat Ducato van
- Saturn Relay, a 2005-2007 minivan

== Other uses ==
- Relay (shop), a France-based chain of convenience stores
- Relay (company), a peer-to-peer political texting platform
- Relay (film), a 2024 thriller film
- "Relay" (song), 1972, by The Who
- Relay bid, in contract bridge
- Relay race, completed in parts by several participants of a team
- Relay neuron, in anatomy
- Relay box, a piece of postal infrastructure.
- Relay (podcast network)

== See also ==
- Retransmission (disambiguation)
- Relais
