= Warning triangle =

Marker used to warn motorists about temporary road hazards

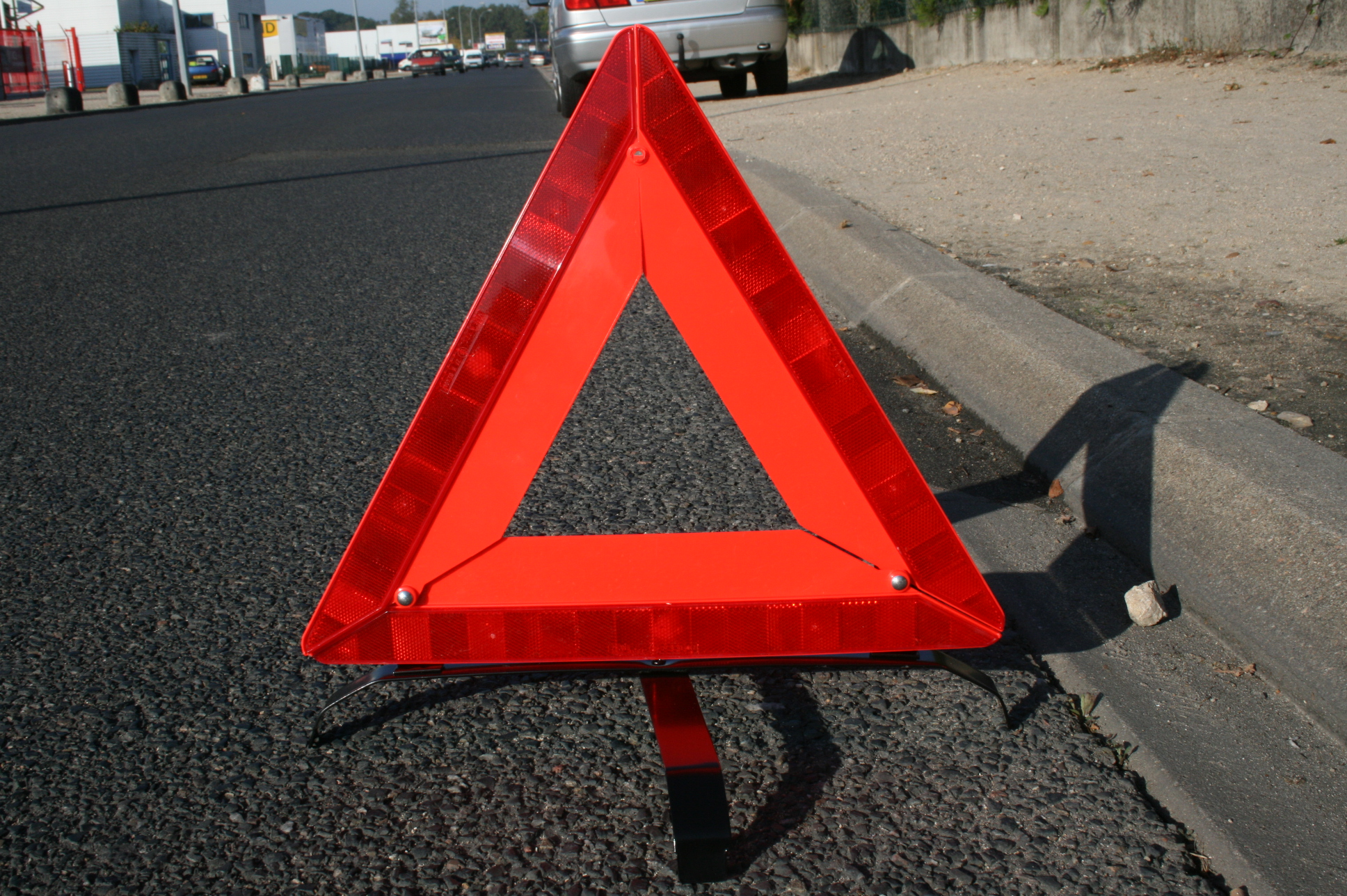
Warning triangle. Euro-variant.

A warning triangle is, together with warning lights, used in order to secure a traffic accident site. The legal rules in the individual states partly order a warning triangle to be brought in the vehicle (in Germany according to § 53a StVZO).

The warning triangle consists of three reflective beams, similar to a cat's eye, and a stable foot.

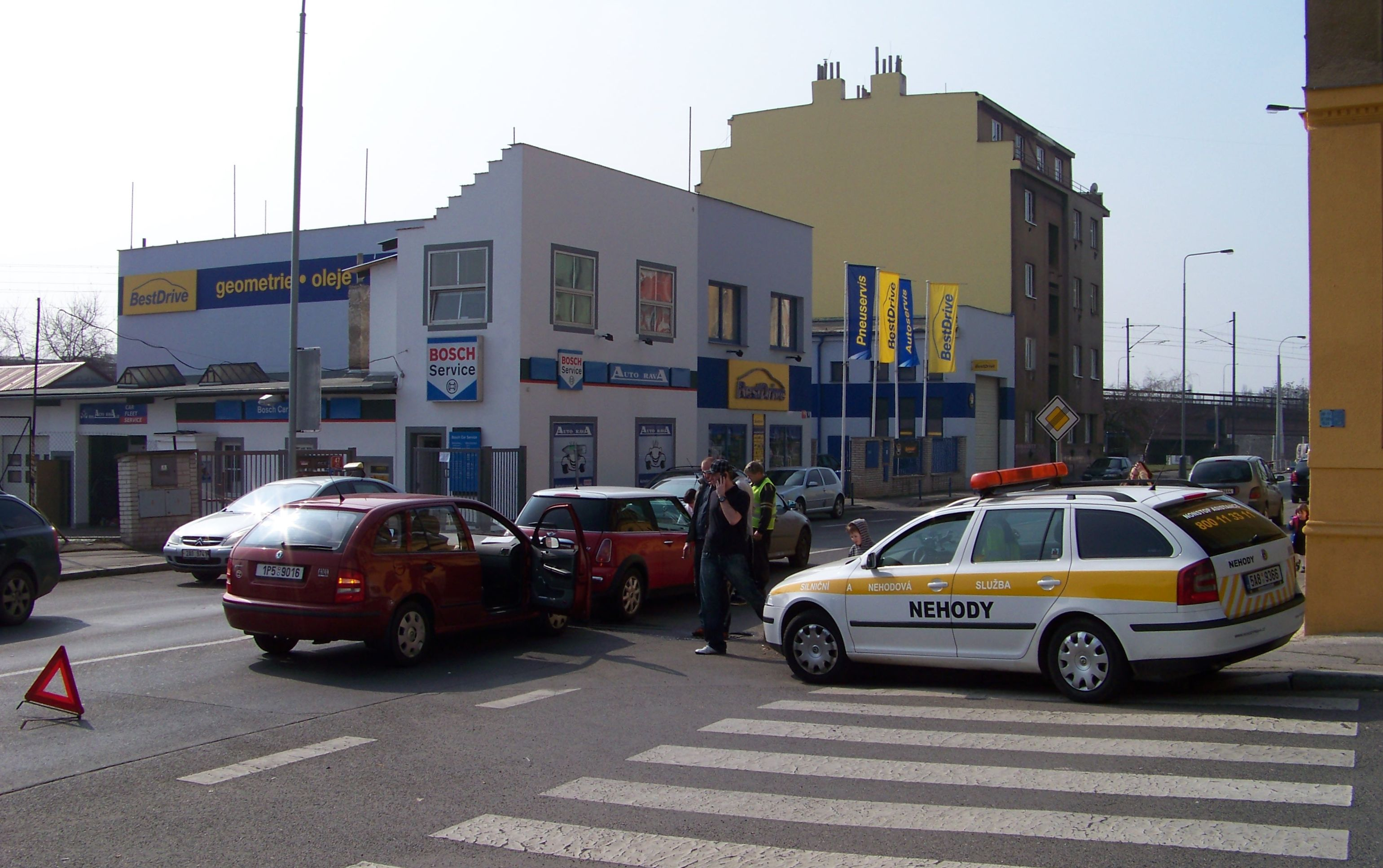
Warning triangle in use near traffic collision site

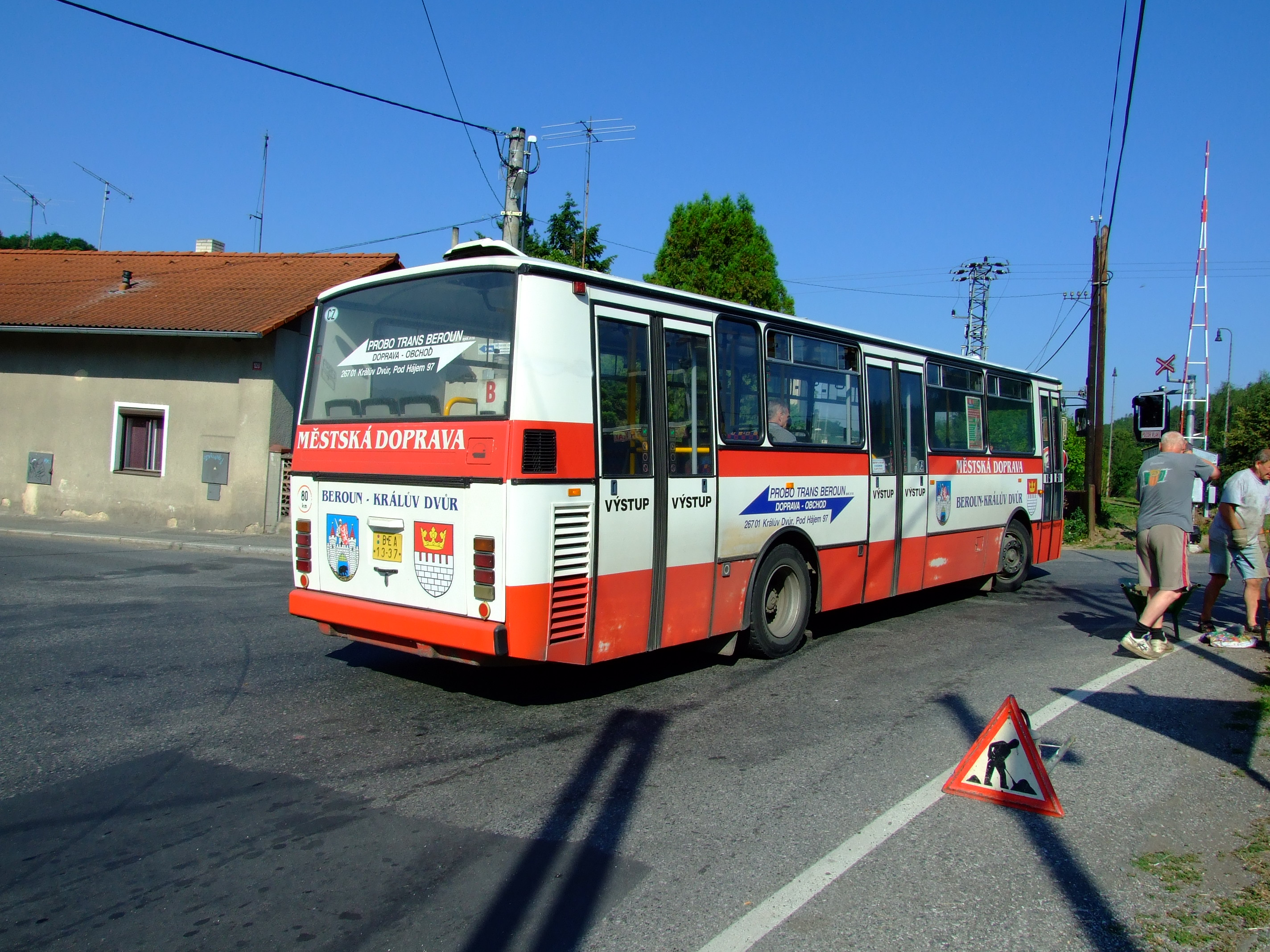
Warning triangle advising of construction

Except from this form, which is prescribed in road traffic, there are also collapsible signals or triangles, used by emergency services, but also for short road closures by other firms with workers in the road, perhaps gasworks or power plants. Collapsible signals also have further inscriptions, as the example photo shows. As they are collapsible, they need smaller space in vehicles than fixed boards.

== Legal ==
=== Germany ===
According to § 15 StVO, a stranded vehicle must be secured with a warning triangle at a sufficient distance, whereby the law orders a minimum distance of 100 metres in the case of fast traffic, such as motorways. This applies not only to the driver of broken-down vehicles, but also the rescue service that stops and offers help. If the vehicle is removed from the breakdown site, the warning triangle must be collected; it is not allowed to leave it standing. In a few cases, a warning triangle may not be placed, if the circumstances do not allow it to be placed safely or practicable (e.g. due to rescuing severely injured people, which may be prioritized).

=== United Kingdom ===
When present, a warning triangle must be placed at least 45 metres ahead of the accident site. Placement of triangles on motorways is, on the other hand, strongly dissuaded.

=== Russian Federation ===
Paragraph 7.2 of the traffic regulations: When the vehicle is stopped and the hazard lights are turned on, as well as in case of their malfunction or absence, the warning triangle must be immediately displayed: in case of a traffic accident; when forced to stop in places where stopping is prohibited, and where, taking into account the visibility conditions, the vehicle cannot be noticed by other drivers in a timely manner. This sign is installed at a distance that provides timely warning of danger to other drivers in a specific situation. However, this distance must be at least 15 meters from the vehicle in populated areas and 30 meters outside populated areas.

Paragraph 7.3 of the traffic regulations: In the absence or malfunction of the hazard lights system on a towed mechanical vehicle, a warning triangle must be fixed on its rear part.

=== Australia ===
Under the Australian Road Rules, all heavy vehicles (GVM over 12 tonnes) must carry 3 portable warning triangles which comply with AS 3790.

If the driver stops on a road, or if the load being carried falls onto the road, warning triangles must be used to warn other road users.

For roads with a speed limit of 80 km/h or more, if the vehicle (or load) cannot be seen for at least 300m in all directions, the warning triangles must be placed:

- 200-250m behind the hazard,
- 200-250m in front of the hazard, and
- directly alongside the hazard.

When the speed limit is under 80 km/h, if the vehicle (or load) is not visible for at least 200m in all directions, the warning triangles must be placed:

- 50-100m behind the hazard,
- 50-100m in front of the hazard, and
- directly alongside the hazard.
