= Opn Sesame =

American company

Opn Sesame is an American company that provides peer-to-peer political text messaging to conservative platforms.

It was created by Gary Coby, and Gerrit Lansing. Coby was a director of advertising at the Republican National Committee and attached to Project Alamo. Lansing was formerly the chief digital officer of the Republican National Committee and of the White House.

Other political P2P texting platforms include Hustle and GetThru on the Democratic side and RumbleUp on the Republican side.

During the 2020 presidential election, campaigns reduced their use of door to door canvassing due to the coronavirus pandemic, and online political advertising on social media platforms became more restricted. Thus, political text messaging became more valuable.

On November 5 2020 Opn Sesame "...sent out thousands of targeted, anonymous text messages urging supporters to rally where votes were being counted in Philadelphia... falsely claiming Democrats were trying to steal the presidential election. The messages directed Trump fans to converge at a downtown intersection where hundreds of protesters from the opposing candidates’ camps faced off... A top Trump campaign official, speaking on condition of anonymity, said the message did not come from the campaign. Because Opn Sesame is used by multiple customers, none of whom the company would identify, it could not be determined exactly who sent the message. Coby declined to comment."

After being notified, Twilio shut down the numbers, stating that the messages violated its policies because they lacked consumer opt-out language. A company spokesperson declined further comments.
