= GetThru =

American company

GetThru, formerly Relay, is an American company that provides a peer-to-peer political text messaging platform.

Daniel Souweine is a cofounder and CEO. He was the National Texting Program director for Bernie Sanders's 2016 campaign and has a B.A. in political science from Brown University.

Other political P2P texting platforms include Hustle on the Democratic side and RumbleUp and Opn Sesame on the Republican side.

== History ==
=== Relay ===
Relay was created by 2016 Sanders campaign alumni and has been used by left-leaning campaigns and organizations such as ACLU and Alexandria Ocasio-Cortez.

=== GetThru ===
In April 2019, Relay was renamed to GetThru to avoid confusion with Relay Networks, a used telecom hardware seller in Minnesota.

== See also ==
- Relay (disambiguation)
