= Mail carrier =

Postal worker

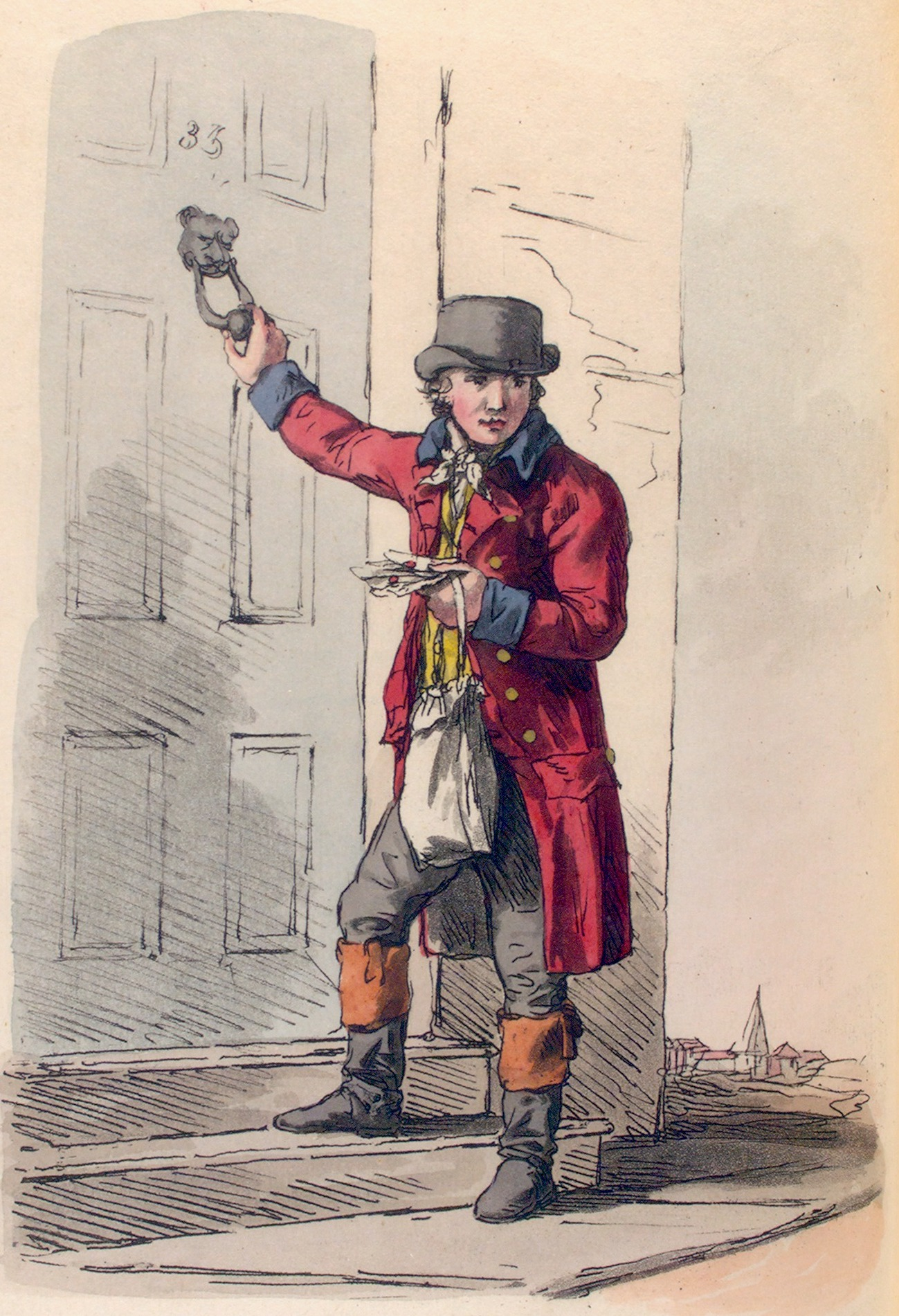
19th-century English postman

A mail carrier, also referred to as a mailman, mailwoman, mailperson, postal carrier, postman, postwoman, postperson, person of post, letter carrier (in American English), or colloquially postie (in Australia, Canada, New Zealand, and the United Kingdom), is an employee of a post office or postal service who delivers mail and parcel post to residences and businesses. The term "mail carrier" came to be used as a gender-neutral substitute for "mailman" soon after women began performing the job. In the Royal Mail, the official name changed from "letter carrier" to "postman" in 1883, and "postwoman" has also been used for many years.

== United States ==
In the United States, there are three types of mail carriers: City Letter Carriers, who are represented by the National Association of Letter Carriers; Rural Carriers, who are represented by the National Rural Letter Carriers' Association; and Highway Contract Route carriers, who are independent contractors. While union membership is voluntary, city carriers are organized nearly 93 percent nationally.

City letter carriers are paid hourly with the potential for overtime. They are also subject to "pivoting" on a daily basis. When a carrier's assigned route will take less than 8 hours to complete, management may "pivot" said carrier to work on another route to fill that carrier up to 8 hours. Postal management uses this tool to redistribute and eliminate overtime costs, based on consultation with the carrier about his/her estimated workload for the day and mail volume projections from the DOIS (Delivery Operations Information System) computer program. Routes are adjusted and/or eliminated based on information (length, time, and overall workload) controlled by the program, consultations with the carrier assigned to the route, and a current PS Form 3999 (street observation by a postal supervisor to determine accurate times spent on actual delivery of mail).

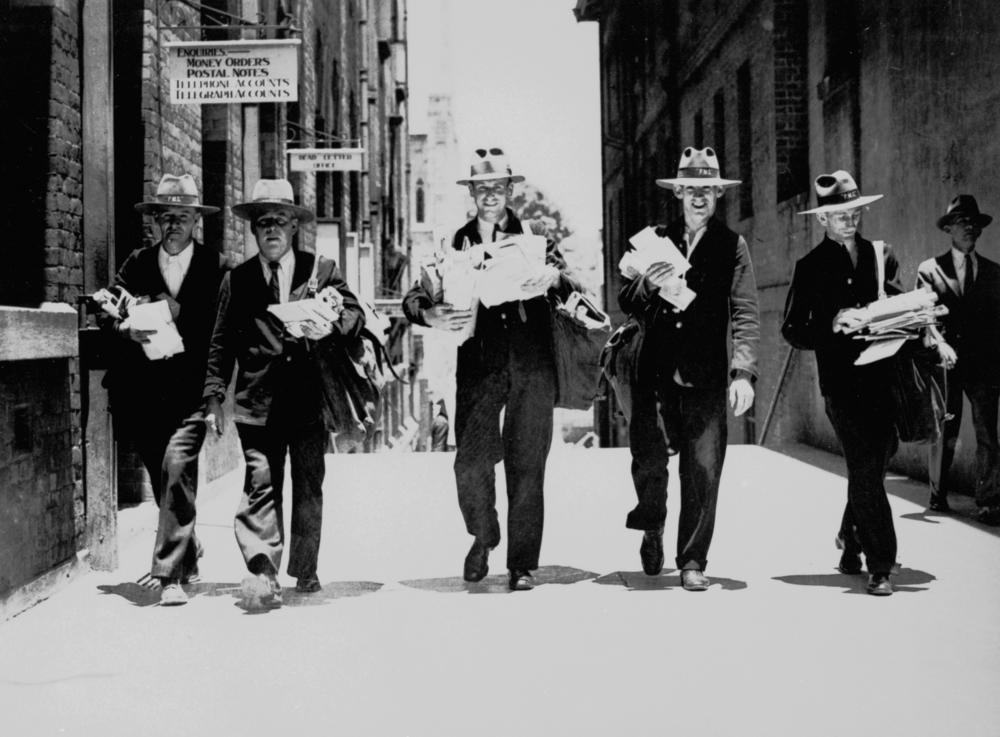
Postmen walking in the laneway beside Brisbane's General Post Office, c. 1936

Rural carriers are under a form of salary called "evaluated hours", usually with overtime built into their pay. The evaluated hours are created by having all mail counted for a period of two or four weeks, and a formula used to create the set dollar amount they will be paid for each day worked until the next time the route is counted.

Highway Contract Routes are awarded to the lowest bidder, and that person then either carries the route themselves or hires carriers to fulfill their contract to deliver the mail.

Letter carriers typically work urban routes that are high density and low mileage. Such routes are classified as either "mounted" routes (for those that require a vehicle) or "walking" routes (for those that are done on foot). When working a mounted route, letter carriers usually drive distinctive white vans with the logo of the United States Postal Service on the side and deliver to curbside and building affixed mailboxes.

Carriers who walk generally also drive postal vehicles to their routes, park at a specified location, and carry one "loop" of mail, up one side of the street and back down the other side, until they are back to their vehicle. This method of delivery is referred to as "park and loop". Letter carriers may also accommodate alternate delivery points if "extreme physical hardship" is confirmed. In cases where mail carriers do not have assigned vehicles, they may also get undelivered mail from relay boxes placed along their routes.

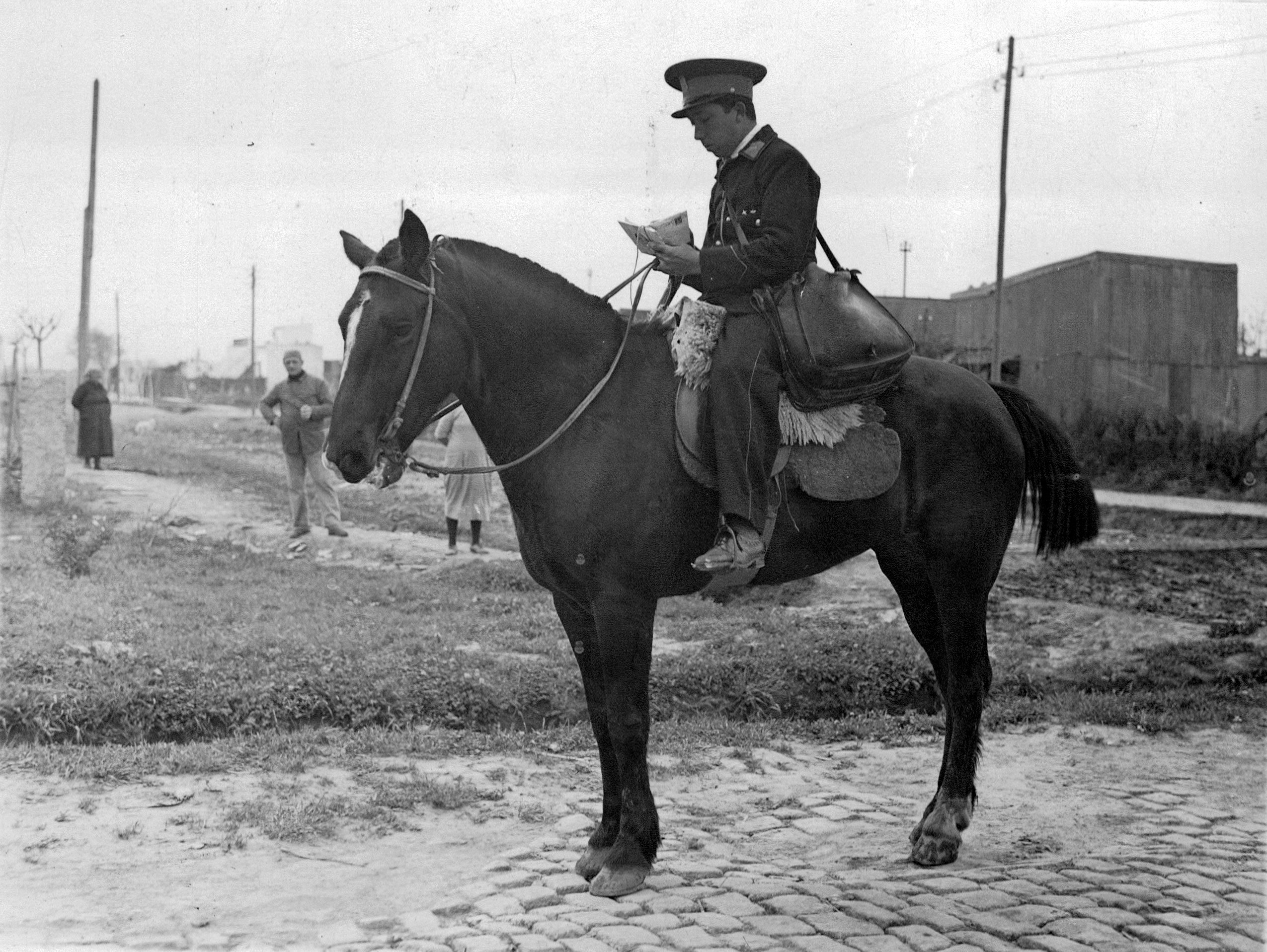
20th-century mounted postman in Buenos Aires

Rural carriers typically work routes that have a lower density and higher mileage than those of letter carriers. They all work mounted routes, leaving their vehicles only to deliver to group mailboxes or to deliver an article that must be taken to a customer's door. However, with former rural areas being urbanized, their routes are growing very similar to mounted "city routes." Rural carriers often use their own vehicles and are not required to wear a uniform. Because of urbanization around cities and because rural carriers deliver mail at less cost to the Postal Service, the rural carrier craft is the only craft in the Postal Service that is growing. Highway Contract Route carriers work routes that were established with a density of less than one customer per mile driven (some later become denser and can then be converted to rural delivery). They are only mounted routes, and all HCR carriers use their own vehicle. These routes are typically found in outlying areas, or around very small communities.

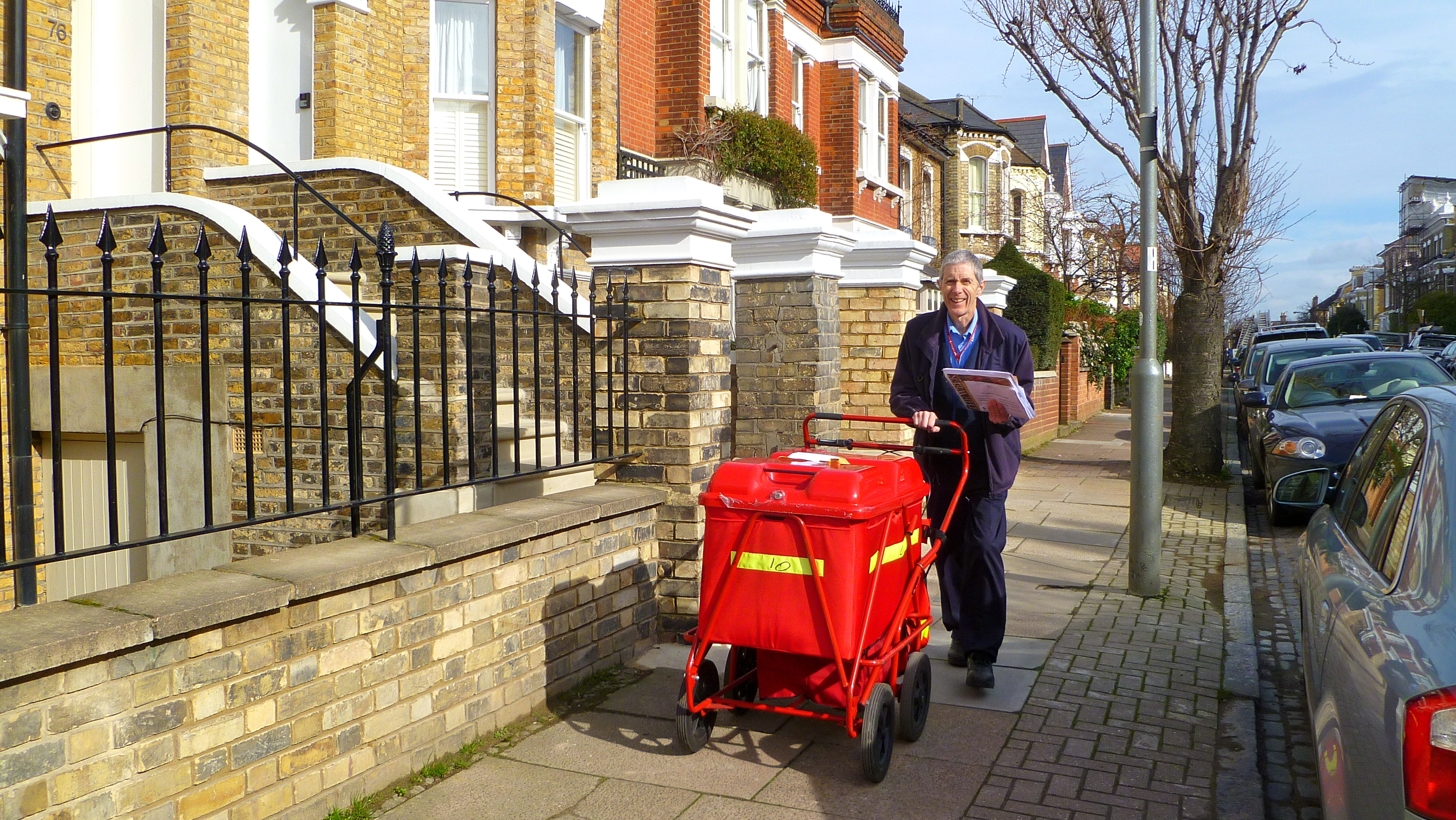
21st-century postman in London delivering mail from a modern mail cart

The three types of mail carriers are also hired differently. A new letter carrier begins as a City Carrier Assistant (CCA). Rural carriers are hired as Rural Carrier Associate (RCA) carriers, without benefits. There is normally an RCA assigned to each rural route and they typically work less frequently than city CCAs. As a result, there are thousands of RCA positions that go unfilled due to lack of applicants that are instead covered by other RCAs until hiring improves for the hiring process explained). Highway Contract Route carriers are hired by the winning bidder for that route. They are not United States Postal Service employees and normally receive lower pay than carriers on city or rural routes.

=== Female carriers ===
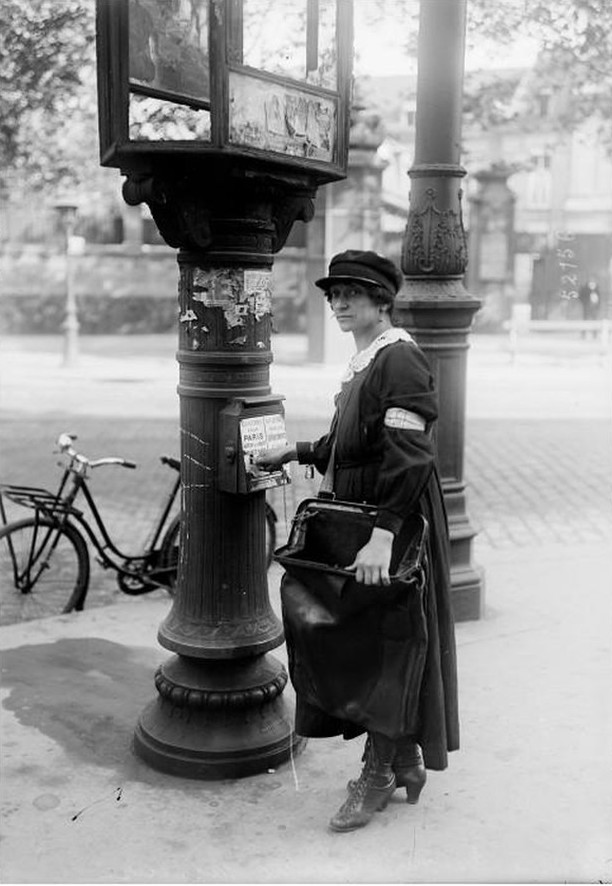
Jeanne Decorne, a female auxiliary mail carrier collecting mail in Paris during World War I about 1915

Women have been transporting mail in the United States since the late 1800s. According to the United States Post Office archive, "the first known appointment of a woman to carry mail was on 3 April 1845, when Postmaster General Cave Johnson appointed Sarah Black to carry the mail between Charlestown Md P.O. & the Rail Road "daily or as often as requisite at $48 per annum". For at least two years Black served as a mail messenger, ferrying the mail between Charlestown's train depot and its post office."

At least two women, Susanna A. Brunner in New York and Minnie Westman in Oregon, were known to be mail carriers in the 1880s. Mary Fields, nicknamed "Stagecoach Mary", was the first black woman to work for the USPS, driving a stagecoach in Montana from 1895 until the early 1900s. When aviation introduced airmail, the first woman mail pilot was Katherine Stinson who dropped mailbags from her plane at the Montana State Fair in September 1913.

The first women city carriers were appointed in World War I and by 2007, about 59,700 women served as city carriers and 36,600 as rural carriers representing 40 per cent of the carrier force.

== Famous carriers ==
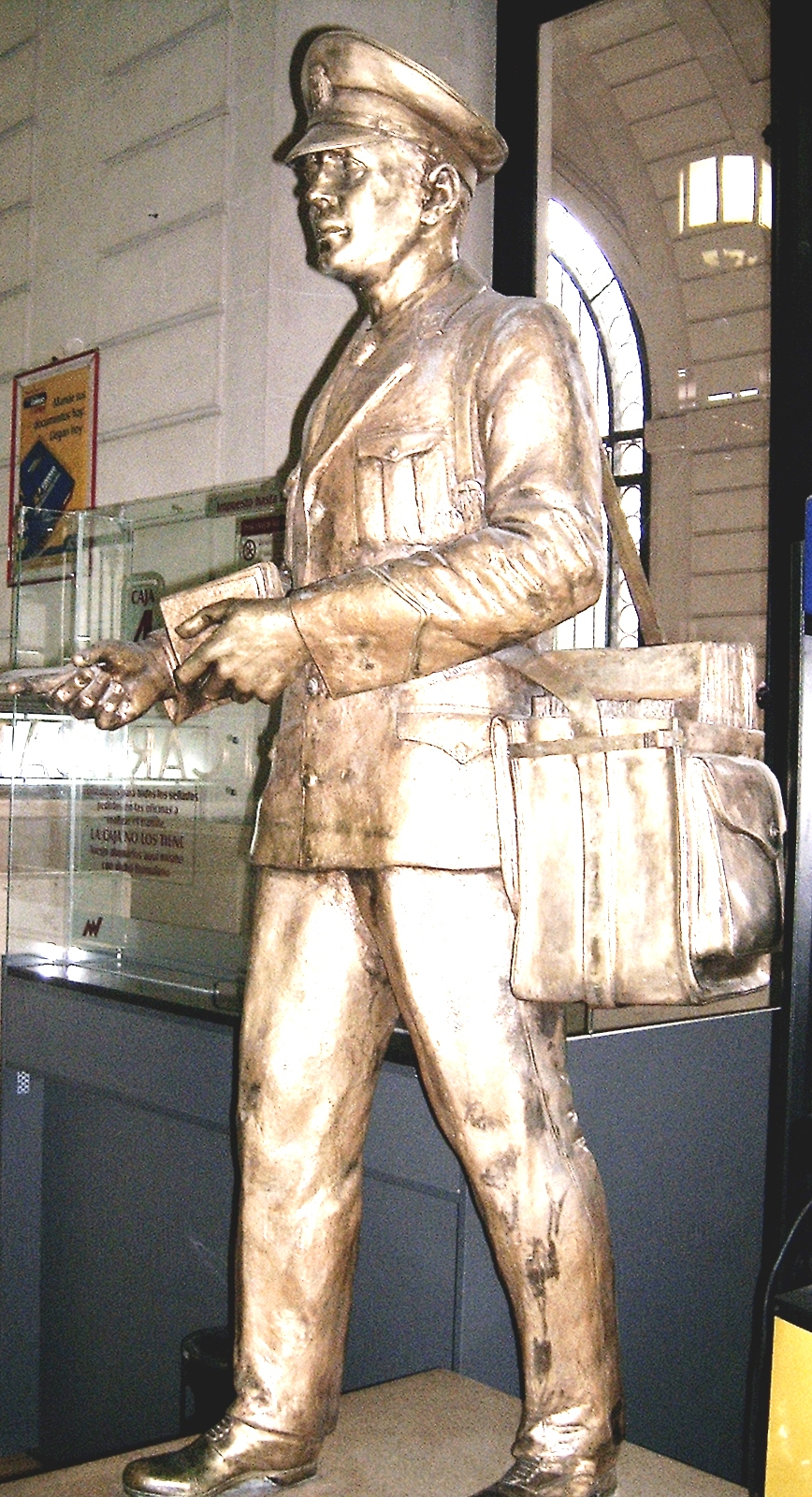
Postmen homage in Rosario, Argentina; opus by Erminio Blotta, Palace General Post Office

Famous real-life letter carriers include:

- Berry van Aerle, Dutch football player (35 caps)
- Raymond van Barneveld, who worked as a postman before becoming a professional darts player
- Olivier Besancenot, candidate for the French presidential elections in 2002 and 2007
- Peter Bonetti, English goalkeeper who played for Chelsea F.C.
- Charles Bukowski, novelist and poet who wrote Post Office
- Allan B. Calhamer, the inventor of board game Diplomacy
- Jean Cameron, Scottish World War 2 postwoman who changed the uniform to allow trousers.
- Steve Carell, American actor
- Ferdinand Cheval, who spent 33 years building an "ideal castle"
- William Faulkner, who quit after being at "the beck and call of every itinerant scoundrel who has two cents to invest in a postage stamp"
- Ace Frehley, original guitarist for the rock band Kiss, worked as a mailman before he became the "Spaceman"
- Domingo French, mailman of the Viceroyalty of the Río de la Plata, turned into revolutionary and soldier during the May Revolution
- Vic Godard, English punk musician, founder of the Subway Sect, became a postman midway through his music career
- Terry Griffiths, a former postman who became a world-champion snooker player
- David Harvey, a goalkeeper who became a postman after leaving football
- Rudolph Hass, developer of the Hass avocado
- Gladys Hillier, English postwoman, inspiration for the title of an album by Fairport Convention
- Brad Hogg, an Australian cricketer who is a former Perth postman
- Elsie Johansson, Swedish poet and author who worked at the postal office for around 30 years before she made her literary debut at the age of 48.
- Alan Johnson, the former UK Shadow Chancellor of the Exchequer
- Kimeru, a famous Japanese pop singer, worked as a mailman before he pursued his singing career
- Keith Knox, a Scottish footballer who also worked as a postman throughout his 25-year career
- Tom Kruse, MBE was a mailman on the Birdsville Track in the border area between South Australia and Queensland
- Stephen Law, philosopher. Expelled from school and worked as a postman until being accepted to Trinity College, Oxford to study philosophy
- Charles Mingus, jazz musician
- Jan Nyssen was a mailman from 1977 to 1997 in Liège (Belgium) and became a Professor of Geography.
- John Prine, Grammy winning folk singer
- Bon Scott, former lead singer of AC/DC was once a 'postie' in Australia
- Allan Smethurst, English singer known as "The Singing Postman"
- Snowshoe Thompson, mail delivery on skis
- Neil Webb, English footballer who became a postman after leaving professional football

== Fictional carriers ==
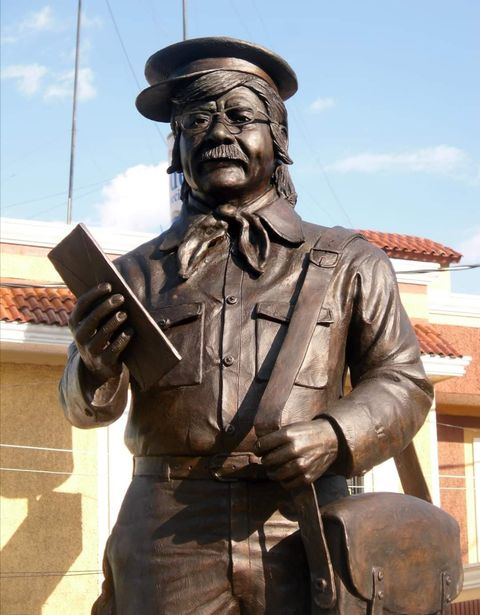
Statue of Jaimito the Mailman in the character's native Tangamandapio

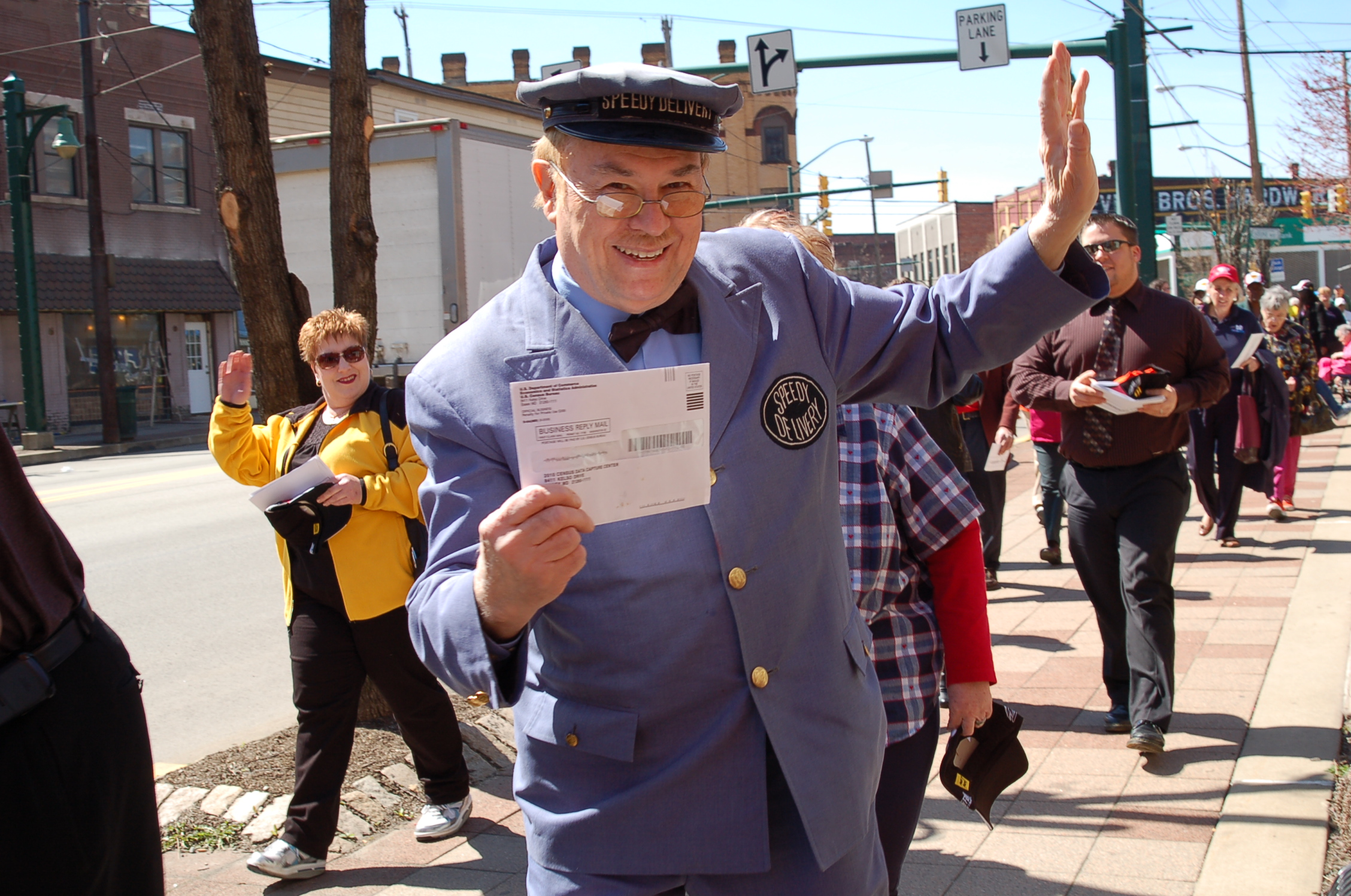
Mr. McFeely delivering a letter

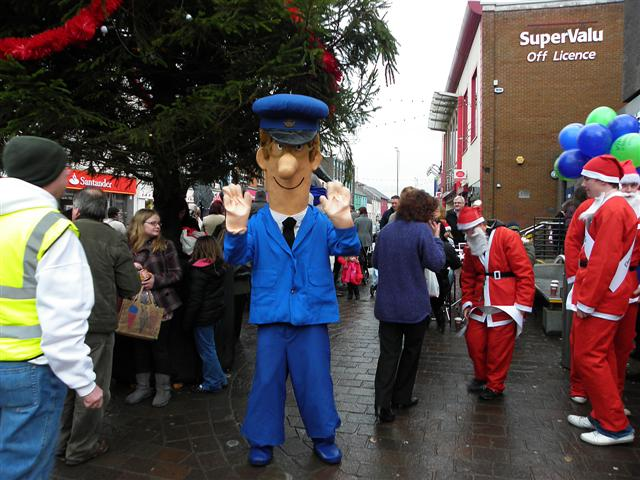
Postman Pat

- Cleveland Brown from Family Guy.
- Cliff Clavin (John Ratzenberger) was a main character on the NBC series Cheers.
- Gordon Krantz as The Postman, main character in the novel and film adaptation (Kevin Costner).
- Jaimito the Mailman (Raúl Padilla), character in the Mexican television sitcom series El Chavo del Ocho.
- Jules (Frédéric Andréi), the main character in the 1981 French thriller film Diva.
- Albert Lippincott, the protagonist of J. Robert Lennon's 2003 novel Mailman
- Newman (Wayne Knight) was a recurring character on the NBC series Seinfeld.
- Mr. McFeely (David Newell) on the PBS series Mister Rogers' Neighborhood and its animated spin-off Daniel Tiger's Neighborhood.
- Mr. Sprinkles (William Newman) in the 1993 film Mrs. Doubtfire.
- Reba the Mail Lady (S. Epatha Merkerson) from the children's TV series Pee-Wee's Playhouse.
- Tom Tipper from The Railway Series book Really Useful Engines, then the series 4 of Thomas & Friends episode "Mind That Bike".
- Pat Clifton, the title character of the children's television series Postman Pat, famed for delivering letters in his "bright red van" with Jess, his "black and white cat".

== In song ==
- Please Mr. Postman
- Return to Sender, with lyrics "I gave a letter to the postman/He put it in his sack"

== In heraldry ==
The coat of arms of Daugailiai, Lithuania features a postman playing post horn.

== See also ==
- Balloon mail
- Jewish letter carriers
- List of fictional postal employees
- Mail delivery by animal
- Mail satchel
