= American Principles Project =

American political organization

- Abbreviation: APP
- Formation: 2009
- Founders: Francis P. Cannon, Jeff Bell, Robert P. George
- Legal status: Tax-exempt organization
- Headquarters: 2800 Shirlington Road, Arlington County, Virginia, 22206
- Coordinates: 38.842541°N 77.084644°W
- Chairman of the Board: Sean Fieler
- Founding President: Francis P. Cannon
- President: Terry Schilling
- Budget: Revenue: $3.86 million Expenses: $4.38 million (FYE December 2024)
- Website: americanprinciplesproject.org

The American Principles Project (APP) is a socially conservative 501(c)(4) political advocacy group founded in 2009 by Robert P. George, Jeff Bell, and Francis P. Cannon. It is chaired by Sean Fieler. It is led by Terry Schilling, the son of the late former U.S. Representative Bobby Schilling. The organization has an affiliated super PAC (political action committee), the American Principles Project PAC, which receives significant funding from Richard and Elizabeth Uihlein. It also has an affiliated 501(c)(3) nonprofit think tank, the American Principles Project Foundation.

The American Principles Project focuses on using social issues, instead of economics, as a way to turn out voters for conservative candidates. APP advocates for parental rights and has criticized or opposed abortion rights, Common Core education standards, Federal Reserve System monetary policy, same-sex marriage, transgender rights, and voting rights legislation. In particular, after the Supreme Court ruling on same-sex marriage in 2015, APP shifted to advocacy against affirmation of transgender identity in young people.

APP uses polls, focus groups, and other behavioral science methods to decide on messaging for political campaign advertising. The organization's headquarters is in Arlington County, Virginia.

== History ==
=== Early activities ===
In 2009, Princeton University legal scholar Robert P. George and political strategist Francis P. Cannon formed APP, originally named American Principles in Action. They aimed to create a grass-roots movement around George's ideas, which included that homosexual sex is morally wrong. The APP board includes Maggie Gallagher, an advocate against same-sex marriage. In 2010, Jeff Bell became the policy director at APP, alongside Cannon. Bell established a project to encourage Tea Party movement lawmakers to support a return to the gold standard. Bell left his APP position in 2014.

In 2011, APP sponsored a Republican presidential primary debate, called the Palmetto Freedom Forum, where panelists Jim DeMint, Steve King, and Robert P. George asked questions. Questions included Tea Party-related topics such as limited government, and candidates discussed upholding the Defense of Marriage Act and repealing other legislation.

=== Focus on social issues ===
Following the Republican Party's post-2012 election review, in which the GOP suggested de-emphasizing social issues, APP published a report detailing the importance of social issues to the Republican Party. The report pointed out that Republicans ran almost exclusively on economic issues during the 2012 election to lackluster effect.

During the 2016 Republican Party presidential primaries, APP created a pledge to sign the First Amendment Defense Act into law that was supported by the majority of Republican candidates. APP criticized Donald Trump for not being among the first to commit to the pledge, although he later supported it.

In 2019, APP published a report that said "married and family-oriented voters are a crucial, and likely the most crucial, component of the GOP coalition" and recommended focusing political messaging on parental rights, education, anti-pornography, anti-abortion, anti-commercial surrogacy of babies, the gold standard, pro-family tax policy, and paid parental leave. In 2021, APP created a membership program that it called an "NRA for Families."

The Advocate has described APP as a right-wing extremist group due to its deceptive campaign advertisements about transgender people, and the Anti-Defamation League said that APP advocates for "anti-transgender hate".

In 2022, APP called itself "Maine Today & Public Insight" to conduct polls in Maine, and it was criticized for using a name that could be confused with existing organizations such as MaineToday Media. APP explained that it was using polls to test messaging for campaign ads: "We like to get them into the news cycle. And we like to generate earned media around the ads to get them even more exposure."

APP is a member of the advisory board of Project 2025, a collection of conservative and right-wing policy proposals from the Heritage Foundation to reshape the United States federal government and consolidate executive power should the Republican nominee win the 2024 presidential election.

Terry Schilling, president of APP, advised the 2024 Republican National Convention platform committee on social and family issues.

== Super PAC ==
APP started its super PAC, originally named the Campaign for American Principles, in 2015 after the Obergefell v. Hodges ruling.

APP chairman Sean Fieler, a hedge fund manager, is a major funder of the American Principles Project and has given more than $1.3 million to the APP super PAC. It received $136,000 from billionaire Robert Mercer in 2016. The PAC received $3.2 million from Richard and Elizabeth Uihlein between 2020 and 2022. Thomas Klingenstein, chairman of the Claremont Institute, contributed $500,000 to the PAC in 2020. In the second half of 2023 the PAC received $2.3 million in funding, including $2.1 million from Restoration PAC, which is mostly funded by the Uihleins.

In 2020, the APP PAC spread disinformation that falsely claimed Joe Biden endorsed "sex change treatments" for children between age 8 and 10 years old. In 2022, the PAC spent $25,000 on commercials for a school board election in Polk County, Florida, supporting candidates that were running on a parental rights platform. The commercials said that Democrats are "teaching trans ideology and anti-American critical race theory", but representatives for Polk County schools said those claims were false. APP does not have local connections to Florida, but it wanted to use the school board election as a test case for other campaigns.

In 2023, the APP PAC spent at least $796,000 on advertising in support of Daniel Kelly in the 2023 Wisconsin Supreme Court election, including ads with false information about school district policies regarding transgender youth. Kelly lost that election to Janet Protasiewicz. In 2023 the PAC also funded an attack ad against Kentucky governor Andy Beshear that said re-electing him would lead to the government removing trans children from families if parents asked them questions, which was not part of his platform. Additional APP ads made other false claims about transgender youth and health care in Kentucky. APP spent $1.7 million to oppose Beshear, who won the election.

The APP PAC has worked with the Logan Circle Group to produce advertisements.

== Policy positions and campaigns ==
=== Abortion ===
APP is anti-abortion. In 2009, APP cofounder George explained his position that abortion is a moral crime. In 2023, APP policy director Jon Schweppe recommended that politicians pursue a federal ban on abortion with exceptions popular with voters, including rape, incest, or if the health or life of the mother is at risk. APP president Schilling also called for "A 15-week law that allow[s] exceptions for rape, incest and life of the mother. That’s harder for the other side to take down."

=== Diversity programs ===
APP has conducted focus groups to evaluate how to effectively criticize the concept of diversity programs as part of election campaigns for conservative candidates, such as evaluating whether the terms "woke" and "DEI" received positive or negative responses.

=== Education ===
The American Principles Project has been critical of Common Core standards. In 2012, Jane Robbins, Senior Fellow at the American Principles Project, and Emmett McGroarty, executive director of APP Education, co-authored a report for the APP and the Pioneer Institute called Controlling Education From The Top: Why Common Core Is Bad For America. APP staff members have testified before state legislatures, encouraging states to withdraw from the Common Core standards. APP argued that the Republican Party would suffer in the 2016 presidential election if it fielded a pro-Common Core candidate. APP president Cannon criticized Trump's appointment of Betsy DeVos as United States secretary of education in 2016 because they did not think she was sufficiently opposed to Common Core.

APP chairman Sean Fieler told Politico in 2014 that he had instructed the American Principles Project to invest $500,000 in organizing the opposition to the Common Core education standards as part of his organization's "long-standing drive for school choice."

=== Gay and transgender people ===
APP aims to change societal attitudes toward gay and transgender rights. APP has funded political campaign ads that reflect the organization's opposition to civil rights protections for LGBTQ people. APP has opposed same-sex marriage and supported restrictions on transgender youth. APP has said that its longterm goal is to eliminate transgender healthcare in its entirety. It has opposed allowing parents to approve gender-affirming healthcare for their children, such as puberty blocking medication.

APP declined to attend the annual Conservative Political Action Conference in 2011 in protest of the conference including a gay conservative group, GOProud, saying that the group was "working against one of the most basic tenets of conservatism".

In the 2017 Virginia elections, the American Principles Project ran anti-transgender robocalls in the district of Democratic candidate Danica Roem, a former journalist who is a transgender woman.

In 2019, APP conducted research on how to raise voter concern about transgender rights in order to build support for conservative candidates, and it decided to emphasize messaging about transgender children in sports competitions. APP President Cannon said their polls showed that bathroom bills were less likely to motivate people to vote than potential unfairness in sports. APP has also said that it used the topic of women's sports as a way to get "opponents of the LGBT movement comfortable with talking about transgender issues".

In 2020, APP president Schilling was criticized for posting disparaging comments about gay and transgender people on Twitter.

In 2022 the American Principles PAC funded political advertisements in six states with claims about Democratic candidates, such as that they were "pushing dangerous transgender drugs and surgeries on kids" and "would destroy girls’ sports". The APP PAC spent close to $16 million in the 2022 midterm elections on anti-trans campaign ads, although the Republican candidates lost many of those elections.

In February 2023, the group's president, Terry Schilling, told CNN that they oppose gender-affirming care for all Americans, regardless of age and that they are working with states to introduce and pass bans on it for all ages, but are starting with bans for children since "that's where the vast majority of the American people are right now." As of April 2023, 24 of 31 ads on the APP YouTube channel were about LGBTQ topics. APP has said that focusing on transgender youth has prompted thousands of new donors to contribute to its organization. Other Republican leaders have opposed efforts to focus on transgender youth over other issues.

According to NOTUS in 2025, it was Schilling who had originally convinced the Donald Trump and the Republican Party to begin its extensive campaign against trans rights.

=== Immigration ===
Alfonso Aguilar, APP's Director of Hispanic Engagement, has spoken in favor of birthright citizenship and against use of the term "anchor baby". He has supported immigration reform, including a path to citizenship for illegal immigrants. In 2015, Aguilar opposed Trump's platforms on legal and illegal immigration, and said Trump's derogatory comments about Mexican immigrants were "ludicrous, baseless and insulting", but endorsed Trump in 2016.

=== Monetary policy ===
The American Principles Project has been critical of Federal Reserve System monetary policy and advocated for monetary reform by suggesting a return to the gold standard. Jeff Bell, APP policy director, went on a bus tour around Iowa in 2011 to give speeches about the gold standard ahead of the 2012 Iowa Republican presidential caucuses. A columnist at the National Catholic Reporter described APP's advocacy for the gold standard as "crazy".

In March 2015, Steve Lonegan, Director of Monetary Policy at APP, met with Federal Reserve Chairman Janet Yellen along with other conservative activists to discuss interest rate policies and related topics.

The American Principles Project organized a conference on economic policy held in August 2015 in Jackson Hole, Wyoming, to advocate for hard money monetary policies and an end to government involvement in the money supply. According to associates of hedge fund CEO Robert Mercer interviewed by Bloomberg, Mercer was the main financial backer of the Jackson Hole Summit.

=== Pornography ===
APP has argued for establishing laws that would limit access to pornographic websites, as a way to change the cultural acceptability of pornography. It has lobbied for state and federal laws requiring age verification systems for pornographic websites, including the Kids Online Safety Act.

=== Technology companies ===
In 2021, APP's policy director Jon Schweppe said that Big Tech companies have interfered in elections and censored conservatives, such as by removing ads, although Facebook and Google have denied that they censored conservative viewpoints. In 2020, Facebook rejected an APP PAC ad because PolitiFact said the ad was potentially misleading. In 2019, William Upton, who had led the APP PAC, said he did not think that there was systemic bias in the tech industry against conservatives.

APP has worked with the American Economic Liberties Project and progressive activist groups such as Demand Progress on antitrust legislation efforts. In 2021, APP made a website and browser extension that provided information about nonprofits, think tanks, and academic institutions that take funding from Facebook, Google, Amazon, or Apple. The intent was to provide transparency about organizations participating in lobbying about antitrust bills.

APP lobbied for the Protecting Americans from Foreign Adversary Controlled Applications Act.

=== Voting ===
APP has worked with Susan B. Anthony Pro-Life America against voting rights legislation. APP supported stricter voting laws, including requiring signature verification for absentee ballots, in order to retain donors to APP who were concerned about voter fraud. In 2021, the APP PAC contributed $280,000 to Restoration PAC, which ran inaccurate commercials about the For the People Act. APP's voting-related work was criticized by some Catholic organizations.
