= Debra Cleaver =

American nonprofit executive

Debra Cleaver is an American nonprofit executive who founded Vote.org and VoteAmerica.

== Early life and education ==
Cleaver attended Pomona College, majoring in psychology with a minor in anthropology. She was active in LGBTQ activism on campus and graduated in 1999. She participated in the startup accelerator Y Combinator in 2016.

== Career ==
Cleaver's interest in politics began following the 2000 United States presidential election, when she witnessed the closeness of the Florida recount. She worked day jobs in technology but volunteered in politics on the side. In the 2004 election, she worked with Swing The State, an online organization that encouraged voter registration in swing states. In 2007, she moved to Los Angeles to work for Myspace.

She has advocated for voting by mail since 2008. For the 2008 election, she founded Long Distance Voter, a website that explained absentee voting requirements. By November 2008, it was receiving half a million visitors without spending any money on marketing.

In 2015, she received a funding grant from the Knight Foundation, and as the organization's operations expanded into voter registration, she renamed it Vote.org. For the 2016 election, the site received 6.5 million visitors and helped register approximately 600,000 voters.

In August 2019, Vote.org's board fired Cleaver and replaced her with a board member. Reporting by Vox described it as due to tensions over Cleaver's management of the organization and harsh style of leadership. The move was highly contentious, and resulted in the withdrawal of $4 million in donor commitments and scuttled partnerships with many of the organization's major donors. A group of donors claiming to represent 60 percent of Vote.org's funding wrote to the board and threatened to withdraw their support if her firing was not explained.

Cleaver subsequently founded VoteAmerica, another voter mobilization project that focused on increasing turnout among unlikely voters, especially by mail-in votes, during the 2020 general election. In 2020, Cleaver applied an idea from her previous work to assist voters with absentee ballot requests in states without online request forms, by creating an online portal through VoteAmerica to help voters fax their requests.

VoteAmerica was supported by a May 2020 Paycheck Protection Program loan received by Democracy Builders, a non-profit organization headed by Seth Andrew. In order for VoteAmerica to receive the money, its employees were briefly on the payroll of Democracy Builders.

Cleaver has been a regular commentator on election issues, including to debunk conspiracy theories, to discuss the voter registration process and challenges for voter registration, as well as ways to increase voter turnout.

In 2021, VoteAmerica sued the state of Georgia over its voter ID law.

== Personal life ==
Although the organizations she has founded are non-partisan, Cleaver's personal politics are liberal.
