= Jewish letter carriers =

Jewish letter carriers were special Jewish postal workers who carried letters to other Jews in Europe. They mainly operated in areas with large Jewish populations.

== Purpose ==
In European business centers where a large Jewish population existed, such as Hamburg, Prague, Gross Glogau, Polish Lissa, Breslau, and Frankfurt am Main, Jews, and at times even female Jews, were found acting as letter-carriers under state control. It was necessary to employ them in the postal service, as it was almost impossible for Christian letter carriers to deliver letters addressed in Hebrew. Another reason may have been the fact that the Jews, in their relations with the post, were subject to exceptional laws.

== History ==
The only detailed notices of Jewish letter-carriers are furnished by the archives of Breslau and Frankfurt; but the position of the letter-carriers in these places was no doubt typical of their status elsewhere. The Jewish letter-carrier, or Post-Jude in Breslau, is first mentioned in a document dated December 13, 1722, which, however, allows the inference that the office had existed for many years before that date. It was maintained until the Silesian wars, after which time Breslau was no longer included in the imperial postal district of Habsburg.

The Jewish letter-carrier of Breslau, as he neither took any oath of office nor received any salary, was not really a government official. His whole income consisted merely of the postage paid by the recipients of the letters. As, however, there were no fixed postal rates, the amount received was so small that the letter-carrier had to pursue in addition some other occupation. That the postal authorities tolerated this state of affairs is shown by the fact that when the letter-carrier was absent on other business, his wife was allowed to take his place.

The first mention of a Jewish letter-carrier in Frankfurt am Main occurs in a decree dating from the middle of the eighteenth century, and setting forth the regulations which the Jews must observe in their relations with the Thurn-und-Taxis Post; but in Frankfurt, too, the office had existed before that time. From 1748 until 1846 it was held by members of the same family, and it was abolished owing to altered conditions. The nephew and assistant of the Jews' letter-carrier who was then in office remained in the Thurn and Taxis service with the same rights and duties, and in 1867 was taken over into the Prussian service.

In Frankfurt, as in Breslau, the Jewish letter-carrier received no pay, but two kreutzers were collected from the addressee for every ordinary letter, and six kreutzers, for a registered letter. In proportion as international commerce developed and the Jewish interests increased, the income of the letter-carrier became correspondingly larger. The last incumbent of the office had a yearly income of 5,000 gulden, out of which, in very busy times, he had to pay his assistants 150 florins each. Besides, when other posts, such as that of Kassel, became united to that of Thurn and Taxis, he was required to pay Count Thurn and Taxis 400 gulden yearly. He ultimately retired on a pension of 1,600 florins.
