= Sean Fieler =

American hedge fund manager and conservative donor

Sean M. Fieler (born 1972 or 1973) is an American hedge fund manager and political donor known for his backing of religious and conservative causes, especially those aligned with his Catholic faith. He is chair of the American Principles Project, a conservative think tank.

== Life and career ==
Sean M. Fieler was born in 1972 or 1973, and he was raised by his family in the Catholic faith in northern California. He graduated from Williams College in Williamstown, Massachusetts, majoring in political economy, in 1995, and he joined the New York-based assets management firm Mason Hill Advisors later that year. Mason Hill was founded in 1986 by William Strong, who would become a longtime partner of Fieler's. It is known for managing the Equinox Partners hedge funds, which Fieler co-founded, and it managed greater than $2 billion in assets in 2011 and $968.3 million in 2016. Fieler was leading the firm by the time Strong exited in 2016.

While living in New York City after his college graduation, his mother encouraged him to become more active in the Catholic Church. An early experience with philanthropy was his donations to a college friend, Jon Fielder, who left for a medical mission in Kenya in 2002 and worked with Christian churches to offer medical services in Africa. Fieler made charitable and political donations through his Chiaroscuro Foundation from 2006 until 2019, and he has been a major donor to the American Principles Project, a conservative think tank, and its chairman. By 2015, he was known as an "ideologically motivated funder" of conservative Catholic groups, according to Inside Philanthropy.

Fieler is married to Brazilian economist Ana Cecília Fieler and they have six children. The two have funded various political efforts together. Fieler lived in Princeton, New Jersey, before moving to Stamford, Connecticut, in 2018 after his wife began a teaching position at Yale University. His family are members of a Catholic community in Stamford.

== Nonprofit leadership ==
=== Chiaroscuro Foundation ===
Fieler has chaired and provided financial backing to the Chiaroscuro Foundation, a nonprofit organization that he led from 2006 to 2019. It notably held a news conference in 2011 attended by religious leaders including the Archbishop of New York, Timothy M. Dolan, during which the archbishop called for efforts to reduce the New York City's abortion rate. It also donated $50,000 to the anti-pornography organization Morality in Media in 2012. Between 2012 and 2017, the foundation donated $1.86 million to the World Youth Alliance, a New York-based conservative group with international affiliates involved in European lobbying.

From 2015 to 2017, the foundation provided $1.79 million to the developers of FEMM, a menstruation tracking app which has been promoted by the Catholic Church. In 2019, The Obria Group, which runs crisis pregnancy centers in the U.S., included the usage of FEMM in its proposal for Title X funds for birth control services later approved by the Donald Trump administration. Fieler has sat on the board of the FEMM Foundation, which runs the app.

Fieler led the Chiaroscuro Foundation until 2019. He subsequently moved his finances to a donor-advised fund, the Chiaroscuro Fund, managed by the Knights of Columbus Charitable Fund (the latter of which he serves as chairman).

=== American Principles Project ===
Fieler is chairman of the American Principles Project, a conservative nonprofit organization, and he has also been its financial backer. From 2013 to 2023, he contributed more than $1.7 million to the American Principles Project political action committee (PAC). In 2014, Fieler's contribution of $1,138,724 to the American Principles Project accounted for 84% of the total funds raised that year for the PAC. The organization has advocated for a return to the gold standard; in 2011, Fieler told the Financial Times that there had been "a growing recognition within the Republican party and in America more generally" against the status quo. He opposed the confirmation of Janet Yellen as chair of the Federal Reserve in 2013, describing her as "an enormously well-credentialed economist who also happens to be an inflationist who should not be allowed to run the Federal Reserve" in a video circulated by American Principles in Action. He told Politico in 2014 that he had instructed the American Principles Project to invest $500,000 in organizing the opposition to the Common Core education standards as part of his organization's "long-standing drive for school choice." The group has also advocated against LGBT rights, especially those of transgender youth.

=== Heritage Action for America ===
Fieler was a board member of the Heritage Action for America foundation.

== Other political contributions and advocacy ==
=== Political campaigns ===
Fieler gave $20,000 to the Republican gubernatorial candidate Carl Paladino in the 2010 New York gubernatorial election against Democrat Andrew Cuomo. He was the largest donor in early 2012 to Democratic New York senate candidate Charles Swanick, who was challenging Republican senator Mark Grisanti in that year's State Senate election. Grisanti was one of four Republican state senators to cross the party line to vote in favor of the 2011 Marriage Equality Act legalizing same-sex marriage in the state. Fieler contributed $50,000 in stock to Restore Our Future, a super PAC supporting the 2012 presidential campaign of Mitt Romney, and $50,000 to a super PAC supporting the presidential campaign of Rick Perry. Fieler donated $10,000 to a super PAC supporting Republican Joe Lhota in the 2013 New York City mayoral election. Fieler gave nearly all of the $394,207 raised in 2013 by the American Principles Fund, a super PAC intended to support socially conservative political candidates which was led by Sarah Huckabee Sanders (who was previously political director of the 2008 presidential campaign of Mike Huckabee, her father). Fieler donated $70,000 to Republican candidate Ken Cuccinelli in the 2013 Virginia gubernatorial election, citing what he termed the "extreme position on abortion" held by Democratic candidate Terry McAuliffe. He also donated $75,000 to Women Speak Out-Virginia PAC, which ran advertisements opposing McAuliffe on his position on abortion. In 2013, Fieler donated $170,000 to New York state PAC City Action Coalition, the majority of $175,750 received in total by the PAC that year. The City Action Coalition used 60% of its spending in 2013 to oppose reelection bids of city council democratic candidates Rosie Méndez, Carlos Menchaca and Ritchie Torres.

uCampaign, a software company which has developed apps for Republican political campaigns, was founded in 2014 with $150,000 in seed capital provided by Fieler. uCampaign later started a peer-to-peer texting platform, RumbleUp, of which Fieler is an equity owner. For the 2014 U.S. elections, Fieler contributed $394,000 to a super PAC that ran advertisements describing New Jersey Democratic Senate candidate Cory Booker as a "pro-abortion extremist" and accusing Republican Wyoming candidate Liz Cheney of supporting same-sex marriage. Cheney was opposed to same-sex marriage, a position which led her to be criticized by her sister Mary Cheney, who is in a same-sex marriage. Liz Cheney later dropped out of her race, while Booker was elected. Fieler donated $65,000 to Sean Reyes, the Utah Attorney General who previously opposed Common Standards in Utah schools, defended the state's ban of same-sex marriage, and was running in the 2014 elections. For the 2014 elections in New York, Fieler donated $41,000 to Rob Astorino, the Republican nominee in the gubernatorial election; $20,000 to the campaign of Republican candidate for attorney general, John Cahill; and $6,500 to the campaign of Democratic candidate for state senator, Fernando Cabrera.

In 2016, Donald Trump appointed Fieler and 33 other Catholic figures to a Catholic advisory group for his presidential campaign launched earlier that year. Fieler contributed $20,000 to the campaign of Republican Delegate Robert Marshall, the opponent of Democratic challenger Danica Roem, a former journalist who is a transgender woman, in the 2017 Virginia House of Delegates election. In 2017, Equinox Partner donated $100,000 to A Time for Choosing, a super PAC supporting former chief justice of the Supreme Court of Alabama Roy Moore during the 2017 United States Senate special election in Alabama. The super PAC was most notable for leaking a poll to far-right new site Breitbart News, showing Moore ahead of senator Luther Strange. Fieler was a donor to CatholicVote, a Catholic group supporting Trump which worked with prominent political strategist Steve Bannon to collect mobile phone location data from people attending mass at a church in Dubuque, Iowa in 2018. Fieler moved to Connecticut in 2018. Around this time, his involvement in state politics included making contributions to Republican candidates running for state offices, including Bob Stefanowski in 2018 and Kim Fiorello in 2020, and $10,000 donation to the Connecticut Republican Party in 2021 and 2022. His first high-profile venture in state politics came in 2022 when he started a super PAC, Parents Against Stupid Stuff PAC. In an interview with The Connecticut Mirror, Fieler said he had founded the PAC to oppose Democratic governor Ned Lamont in that year's gubernatorial election for conflicting with the rights of parents on the issues of critical race theory, "sexually explicit curricula in public schools", and the participation of transgender youth in girls' sports. Fieler said the PAC is independent of the American Principles Project. The PAC commissioned a political advertisement parodying a controversial sex education lesson used in an Enfield school lesson the year before that was subsequently featured in national news. As of September 2023, according to the Connecticut State Election Enforcement Commission, Fieler donated $883,500 to the PAC, accounting for more than 99% of the total funds raised.

=== Same-sex marriage ===
Fieler was the largest donor to the Institute for American Values (IAV), a group led by same-sex marriage opponent David Blankenhorn; he told The New York Times in 2013 that his annual donations to IAV "ranged from $200,000 to $250,000." After Blankenhorn changed his position on the legalization of same-sex marriage in June 2012, Fieler quit IAV's board, and he later told The New York Times that "The problem with gay marriage and the position David has taken is it promotes a very harmful myth about the gay lifestyle. It suggests that gay relationships lend themselves to monogamy, stability, health and parenting in the same way heterosexual relationships do. That's not true." In 2013, Fieler donated over $1 million to the National Organization for Marriage (NOM), an organization which opposes the legalization of same-sex marriage. A report released by NOM in 2015 showed that Fieler had provided $1.25 million of the group's $2 million in donations contributed to the Stand for Marriage Maine PAC in efforts to repeal Maine's same-sex marriage law through voter referendum (Question 1) in 2009.

Fieler remained opposed to the legalization of same-sex marriage in 2023, contending that Obergefell v. Hodges – the 2015 U.S. Supreme Court case that made it legal nationwide – "is a huge impediment to moving forward with family formation in the United States."

=== Transgender rights ===
In late 2013, Fieler was reported to have contributed at least $200,000 (compared to the total amount raised of $500,000) to an effort by the Privacy for All Students coalition to place a voter referendum in California's November 2014 elections that would repeal the School Success and Opportunity Act, a recently enacted state law intended to protect transgender students. He was the largest contributor to the unsuccessful effort. In early 2015, he agreed to pay a $2,400 fine from the state's Fair Political Practices Commission for his failure to file a donor report for his contributions to Privacy for All Students. Fieler wrote an opinion article for the conservative news website The Daily Signal in 2015 in which he warned social conservatives about the transgender rights movement following Caitlyn Jenner's recent coming out as a transgender woman. In the article, Fieler describes transgender people as "a small, troubled minority", and writes that "Unlike the gay lifestyle, the transgender lifestyle has not been, and perhaps never can be, normalized."

=== Abortion ===
Fieler has served as a board member of the anti-abortion group Susan B. Anthony Pro-Life America since 2012. He has supported the American Association of Pro-Life Obstetricians and Gynecologists and Students for Life.

Fieler credited former President Donald Trump's appointments to the Supreme Court for bringing about the 2022 decision in Dobbs v. Jackson Women's Health Organization to reverse the constitutional protections for the right to have an abortion afforded by Roe v. Wade. He said the following year: "To have Roe overturned is just fantastic."

=== Assisted suicide ===
Fieler provided $475,000 out of the total $730,000 raised by the Massachusetts Alliance Against Doctor Prescribed Suicide, a group formed to oppose a 2013 ballot initiative in Massachusetts legalizing physician-assisted suicide which ultimately narrowly failed to pass.

== Influence ==
In The Chronicle of Philanthropy, Church historian Massimo Faggioli of Villanova University criticized Fieler for his alleged influence on the Catholic Church in the United States through his backing of conservative Catholic organizations. Faggioli contended that many of these conservative nonprofits were involved in a recent ideological division between all Catholics in which philanthropy has played a significant role. He said that the church had also been vying for money from donors to conservative nonprofits, leading these donors' interests to have an outsized influence on the church compared to the interests of the church itself. In response, Fieler denied that his philanthropy had made the church more conservative, and described the implication as "kind of crazy."
