= Retransmission =

Retransmission might refer to:

- Retransmission (data networks), the resending of packets which have been damaged or lost
- Replication of a signal at a repeater
- re-broadcast through a rebroadcaster or broadcast translator or booster, or relay station
- Retransmission consent, permission for a cable or satellite company to carry a TV station
- ReTrans Midt, a Norwegian waste collection company

== See also ==
- Relay (disambiguation)
