= Relay channel =

Channel used to relay signals

In information theory, a relay channel is a probability model of the communication between a sender and a receiver aided by one or more intermediate relay nodes.

== General discrete-time memoryless relay channel ==
A discrete memoryless single-relay channel can be modelled as four finite sets, $X_1, X_2, Y_1,$ and $Y$, and a conditional probability distribution $p(y,y_1|x_1,x_2)$ on these sets. The probability distribution of the choice of symbols selected by the encoder and the relay encoder is represented by $p(x_1,x_2)$.

               o------------------o
               |   Relay Encoder  |
               o------------------o
                 Λ              |
                 | y1        x2 |
                 |              V
o---------o x1 o------------------o y  o---------o
| Encoder |--->|   p(y,y1|x1,x2)  |--->| Decoder |
o---------o    o------------------o    o---------o

There exist three main relaying schemes: Decode-and-Forward, Compress-and-Forward and Amplify-and-Forward. The first two schemes were first proposed in the pioneer article by Cover and El-Gamal.

- Decode-and-Forward (DF): In this relaying scheme, the relay decodes the source message in one block and transmits the re-encoded message in the following block. The achievable rate of DF is known as $\max_{p(x_1,x_2)} \min \left( I\left( x_1; y_1 | x_2 \right) , I\left( x_1, x_2 ; y \right) \right)$.
- Compress-and-Forward (CF): In this relaying scheme, the relay quantizes the received signal in one block and transmits the encoded version of the quantized received signal in the following block. The achievable rate of CF is known as $\max_{p(x_1)p(\hat y_1 | y_1)p(x_2)} I\left( x_1; \hat{y_1}, y | x_2 \right)$ subject to $I(x_2;y) \geq I(y_1; \hat y_1 | y)$.
- Amplify-and-Forward (AF): In this relaying scheme, the relay sends an amplified version of the received signal in the last time-slot. Comparing with DF and CF, AF requires much less delay as the relay node operates time-slot by time-slot. Also, AF requires much less computing power as no decoding or quantizing operation is performed at the relay side.

== Cut-set upper bound ==
The first upper bound on the capacity of the relay channel is derived in the pioneer article by Cover and El-Gamal and is known as the Cut-set upper bound. This bound says $C \leq \max_{p(x_1,x_2)} \min \left( I\left( x_1; y_1, y | x_2 \right) , I\left( x_1, x_2 ; y \right) \right)$ where C is the capacity of the relay channel. The first term and second term in the minimization above are called broadcast bound and multi-access bound, respectively.

== Degraded relay channel ==
A relay channel is said to be degraded if y depends on $x_1$ only through $y_1$ and $x_2$, i.e., $p(y | x_1, x_2, y_1) = p(y | x_2, y_1)$. In the article by Cover and El-Gamal it is shown that the capacity of the degraded relay channel can be achieved using Decode-and-Forward scheme. It turns out that the capacity in this case is equal to the Cut-set upper bound.

== Reversely degraded relay channel ==
A relay channel is said to be reversely degraded if $p(y, y_1 | x_1, x_2) = p(y | x_1, x_2)p(y_1 | y, x_2)$. Cover and El-Gamal proved that the Direct Transmission Lower Bound (wherein relay is not used) is tight when the relay channel is reversely degraded.

== Relay without delay channel ==
In a relay-without-delay channel (RWD), each transmitted relay symbol can depend on relay's past as well as present received symbols. Relay Without Delay was shown to achieve rates that are outside the Cut-set upper bound. Recently, it was also shown that instantaneous relays (a special case of relay-without-delay) are capable of improving not only the capacity, but also Degrees of Freedom (DoF) of the 2-user interference channel.

== See also ==
- Cooperative diversity
- Relay (disambiguation)
