= RumbleUp =

American company

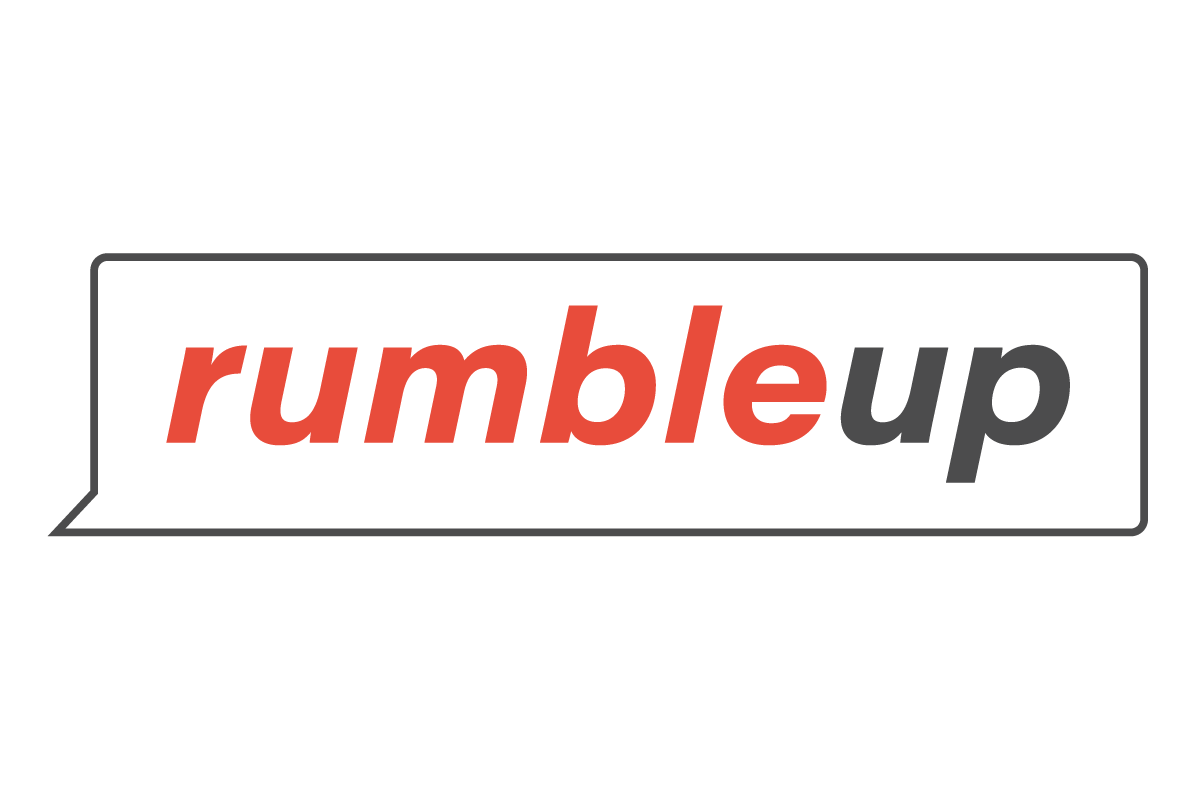
- Headquarters: Washington, DC, United States
- Founder: Thomas Peters
- Website: rumbleup.com
- Current status: Active

RumbleUp is an American company that provides a peer-to-peer (P2P) text messaging platform for non-profits, political organizations, and public safety announcements. The platform initiates personal conversation between the staff, supporters or designated representatives of organizations and their targeted supporters or clients. It was founded in December 2017 by Thomas Peters.

== Product ==
RumbleUp assigns imported contacts to volunteers or authorized agents and composes message scripts. Agents deliver messages by repeatedly pressing "send" from their personal phone, tablet or other device. This process differs from blast messaging, in that each message is initiated by a human being, and recipients can respond to volunteers or agents and enter a unique back-and-forth conversation. RumbleUp's platform is not an auto dialer using a random number generator, and therefore avoids violating SMS regulations in the Telephone Consumer Protection Act. Text message are sent from a local area code or toll-free phone number.

== History ==
In 2018, Washington state-based uCampaign, a web development startup focused on creating applications for Republican candidates and right-leaning causes, launched RumbleUp. RumbleUp's usage by conservative campaigns in the 2018 midterms marked the first time a P2P service had been available to campaigns on the center-right since Hustle's 2017 decision to only work for liberal campaigns.

During the 2018 midterm election season RumbleUp sent tens of millions of texts for over 100 clients, including governors, senators and members of Congress. 2018 adoption include Heritage Action, FreedomWorks, Greg Abbott's successful bid for Governor of Texas and Florida Representative Brian Mast’s successful 2018 primary bid. Efforts to connect Florida voters displaced by Hurricane Michael to their new voting locations coincided with a voter turnout increase of 10% in the area and GOP victories in elections decided by recounts. RumbleUp was used for Jeff Johnson's 2018 Minnesota gubernatorial run and Mike Dunleavy's successful 2018 Alaska gubernatorial campaign.

In October 2018, it was used by the Florida GOP in Hurricane Michael relief efforts. Over 70,000 numbers were texted and the organization was able to share FEMA hotlines and shelter directories with displaced citizens and connect them with other local, state and federal resources as well as help them fill out absentee ballots and locate their voting locations.

An overload of P2P volume in the days leading up to the 2018 midterm elections caused Twilio to crash, limiting P2P providers' SMS capabilities. RumbleUp’s provider-agnostic system was the only P2P provider to remain fully operational in the days leading up to election day.

In April 2019, RumbleUp won two Gold Pollies, the American Association of Political Consultants' highest honor - one for Best Use of Phones for the use of the platform in the aftermath of Hurricane Michael, and another for Best Use of New Technology for their MMS capabilities. They also won the AAPC’s People’s Choice Award in the Phones division.

RumbleUp was used by over 300 campaigns up and down the ballot in 2019, including Daniel Cameron's successful campaign for Attorney General of Kentucky, Mike Testa's successful campaign for New Jersey State Senate and Roxy Ndebumadu’s successful campaign for Bowie, MD city council.

In October 2019, RumbleUp announced the launch of RumbleUp Pro, a system redesign that includes a new user interface, a desktop application, a CRM system and many other features. In 2020 RumbleUp’s growth was spurred by the coronavirus pandemic as traditional in-person campaigning became impossible and digital tactics such as P2P texting rose to the front of the campaign scene. At the beginning of the outbreak in March, Peters reported that sign-ups increased by around 200% over just four days. During the year RumbleUp began partnerships with the NRSC and NRCC, operating under the whitelabels Majority Messenger and GOP Envoy, respectively.

In 2020, RumbleUp was added to the FirstNet Catalog, a library of secure applications availabke to public safety agencies as a partnership between the federal government and AT&T. As of 2024, RumbleUp has received $3.1 million from Republican candidates, political action committees and elected officials.

== See also ==
- GetThru
- Opn Sesame
