= Hustle (company) =

American company

- Headquarters: San Francisco, California, United States
- Founders: Roddy Lindsay, Tyler Brock, Perry Rosenstein
- CEO: Jesse Hassinger
- Website: www.hustle.com
- Current status: Active

Hustle is an employee-owned, independent, American company that provides an all-in-one mobile communications platform (peer-to-peer and broadcast text messaging, dialer, video messaging) for areas such as politics, higher education, and non-profits. The platform initiates personal conversation between organizations and their targeted supporters or clients. Hustle was founded in December 2014, by Perry Rosenstein, Roddy Lindsay, and Tyler Brock.

== Product ==
Organizers use the product to assign imported contacts to agents and compose message scripts. Agents deliver messages by repeatedly pressing "Send" from their personal phone. This process differs from blast messaging, in that recipients can respond to agents and initiate conversation. Because Hustle's tool is not an "automatic telephone dialing system" using a "random or sequential number generator," it avoids violating SMS regulations in the Telephone Consumer Protection Act. When a text message is received, it appears as if it was sent from a local area code.

Other political P2P texting platforms include GetThru (used by ACLU and AOC) on the Democratic side and RumbleUp and Opn Sesame on the Republican side.

== History ==
Hustle was founded by Perry Rosenstein, a 2008 Obama campaign strategist, Roddy Lindsay, a former Facebook software engineer, and Tyler Brock, a former software engineer at MongoDB. The lobbying group FWD.us, an organization Lindsay volunteered for, became Hustle's first client.

The Clinton campaign tested the platform in 2015 and later developed Megaphone in-house, a tool with similar mass texting functionality where recipients can start one-on-one conversations.

Hustle was one of several digital platforms used for Bernie Sanders's 2016 campaign strategy for GOTV efforts. The Text for Bernie Team, consisting of around 1,200 volunteers, used Hustle to reach out to voters and volunteers. In Oklahoma, four members of Zach Fang's campaign team brought 381 individuals to the first official campaign event, and later, 338 in Tulsa. In Tulsa, 95 percent of participants reported the reason for their attendance was a text through Hustle.

As of 2016, over 10 million text messages have been sent over Hustle, and the largest volume of messages on a single day is 700 thousand. As of 2017, Hustle has initiated more than 38 million conversations with more than 25 million people. In the company's spread into higher education, 30 schools have used Hustle for fundraising.

Hustle partnered with Michelle Obama's Better Make Room campaign in 2017, providing access to Hustle analytics and technical support for the campaign's texting tool Up Next.

In 2017, Hustle created a partnership with NGP VAN, integrating their My List tool into the Hustle product. Using My List, organizers can import contact lists directly into Hustle. Originally a non-partisan company, Hustle supported their Democratic exclusivity with clients through their partnership with NGP VAN.

In early 2019, Hustle laid off part of its workforce and Roddy Lindsay stepped down as CEO.

In later 2020, Social Capital (venture capital) acquired Hustle.

In February 2021, Hustle acquired Tape, led by Dave Schatz and Tima Zelinsky, which has become the technology that powers the primary Hustle Video Messaging product.

In September 2024, there was controversy surrounding Hustle, with its CEO Chamath Palihapitiya hosting a fundraiser that raised $12 million for Donald Trump's reelection campaign, which angered many of Hustle's clients many of which are Democratic entities.

In February 2025, Jesse Hassinger took over as CEO. Jesse has been with Hustle for over eight years, including as Director of Support during the critical 2020 election season and later leading as Director of Product. Before Hustle, Jesse's background was in political campaigns across New York, Maryland, and Colorado.

In April 2026, Hustle employees bought the company. Hustle is now an independent, employee-owned company.

=== Funding ===
In August 2017, Hustle raised $8 million in venture capital during their Series A funding round, led by Social Capital. This round, which included new and existing investors such as Salesforce and Twilio, puts the company's total funding at $11 million.

As of April 2026, Hustle is an independent, employee-owned company.
