= Relay box =

Publicly placed mail delivery infrastructure

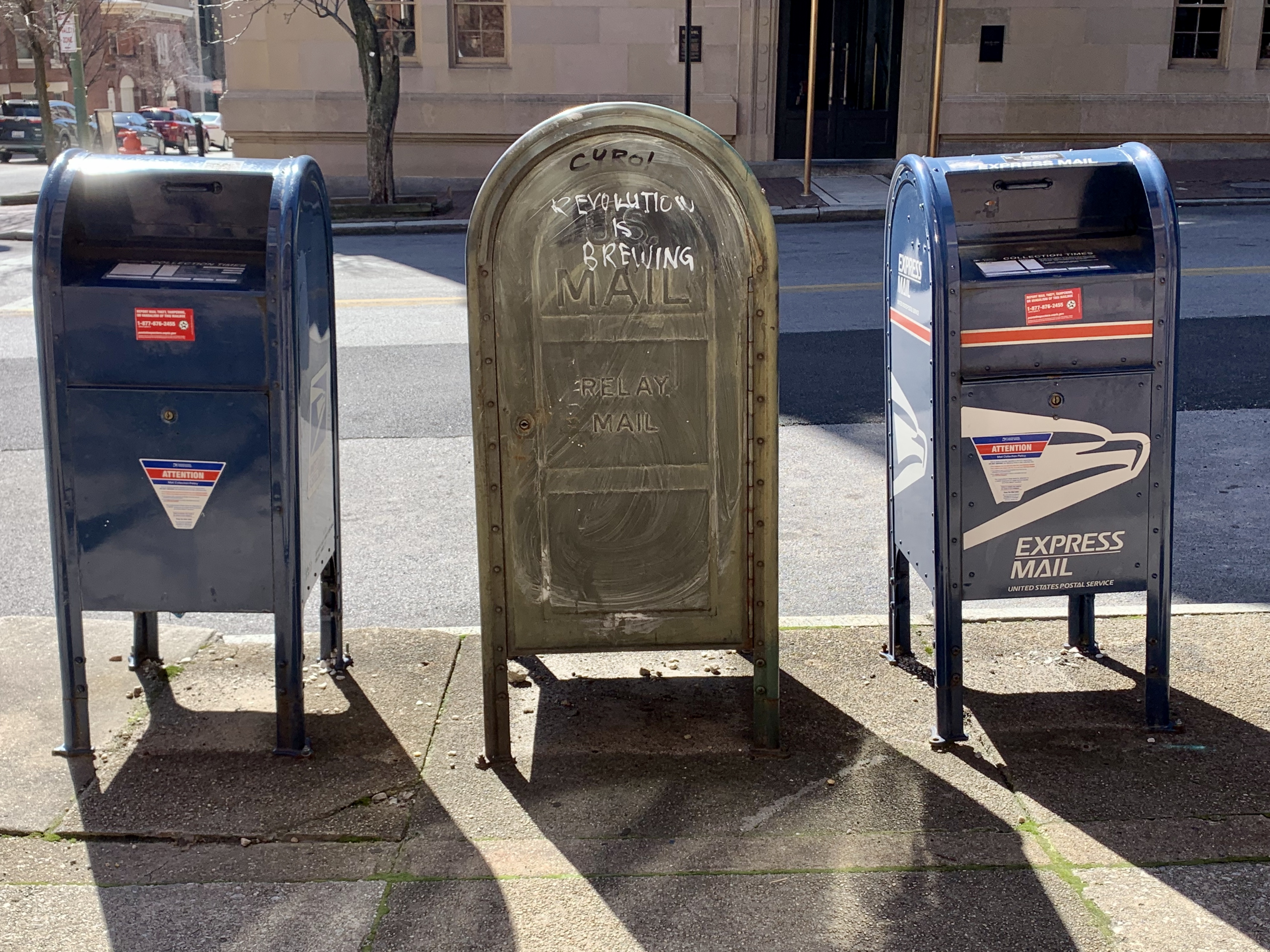
A regular US Postal Service mailbox, a letter carrier box, and an express only box

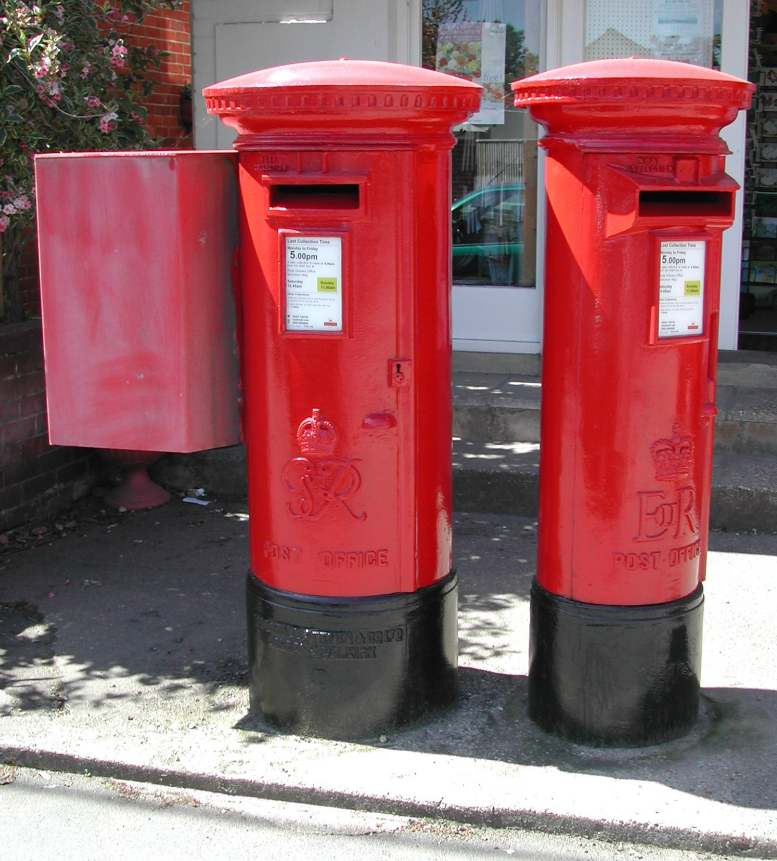
Two Royal Mail pillar boxes, with a pouch box attached to the left box

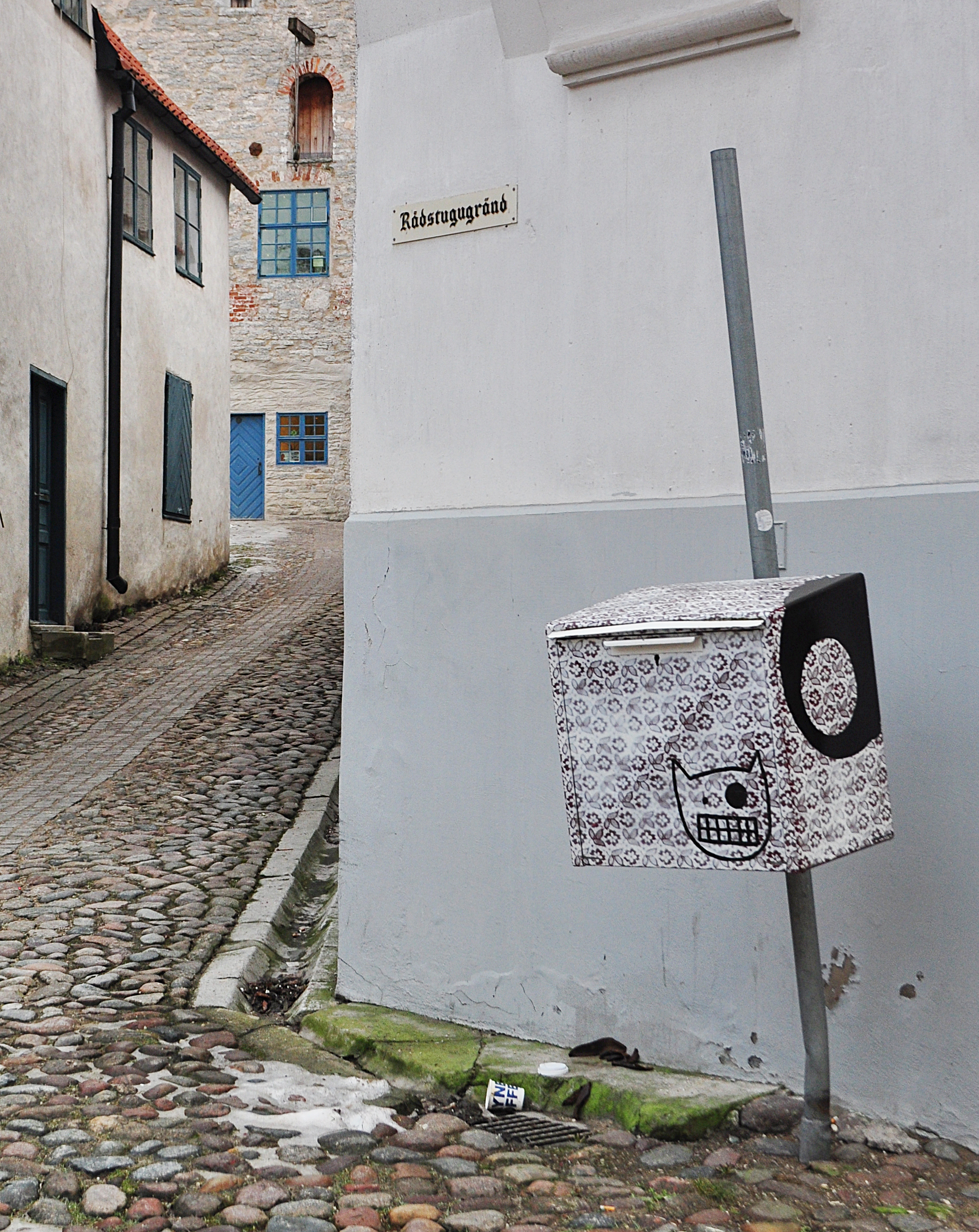
A Swedish postal relay box ("Buntlåda"), decorated by graffiti

A postal relay box (American English) or pouch box (British English) is a piece of postal infrastructure that may be used to provide deliverable mail to walking (or cycling) mail carriers whose routes do not take them past a post office or sorting facility.

In postal systems where walking mail carriers do not have a vehicle to store undelivered items of post, the amount of mail to be delivered may be too big or heavy to carry in a bag, necessitating the use of a relay box. To allow convenient and secure access to pre-sorted bundles of yet to be delivered mail, a locked relay box may be used to temporarily cache items along a delivery route. It is replenished by staff using a vehicle, and is later accessed by a postal worker carrying out a walking route.

The practice of using relay boxes has stopped or declined as volumes of mail have been decreasing. It is also being outmoded by the adoption of "park and loop" methods where a mail carrier completes a walking route from their nearby parked mail van. Although in decline, the US postal service confirmed that they are still in active use as of 2017.

Although often located in convenient public places, relay boxes have an inconspicuous appearance, lack an aperture, and are locked to the public. Like post boxes, they need to be secured to deter theft and tampering, and are often attached to the ground directly, to a lamp post, or attached to the back of a public post box.
