= UCampaign =

U.S. web development company

uCampaign, the operating name of Political Social Media LLC, is a Washington-based web development startup that produces apps for United States Republican campaigns. The company has produced apps for dozens of right-wing campaigns and organizations, including: Maryland Governor Larry Hogan, the Republican National Committee, the Family Research Council, the National Rifle Association, and Senator Rand Paul. uCampaign produced similar apps for President Donald Trump (known as America First) and the primary campaign of Senator Ted Cruz. News organizations raised privacy concerns over how the apps collected broad user data beyond the apps' stated purpose. Outside of the United States, their apps are used by conservative political parties and anti-abortion groups in Australia, Canada, and Europe, including an app in support of Brexit. uCampaign charges a single fee for the base app and monthly maintenance thereafter.

Their apps use concepts from video games to induce users towards specific actions with badges, points, and social recognition as rewards, a concept known as gamification. For example, in uCampaign's National Rifle Association app, the player is awarded points for sending messages to elected officials.

The company's chief executive, Thomas Peters, is a Catholic blogger and former web developer. He founded the company in 2014 from his earlier experiences working as a conservative activist in 2012 and frustrations at the success of the Obama campaign's digital campaigning. Peters received $150,000 in seed funding from Sean Fieler, a hedge fund president and prominent donor to Conservative organizations.
