= Warning light =

Warning light may refer to:

- Aircraft warning lights, a device used on radio masts and towers and other tall structures to prevent collisions
- Idiot light, an indicator of malfunction of a system within a motor vehicle, especially if used to replace a gauge
  - Check engine light, to indicate malfunction of a computerized engine management system
- Warning Light, an American ambient music project

== See also ==
- Emergency light
