= Statue of Henry W. Grady =

Statue in Atlanta, Georgia

Henry W. Grady statue
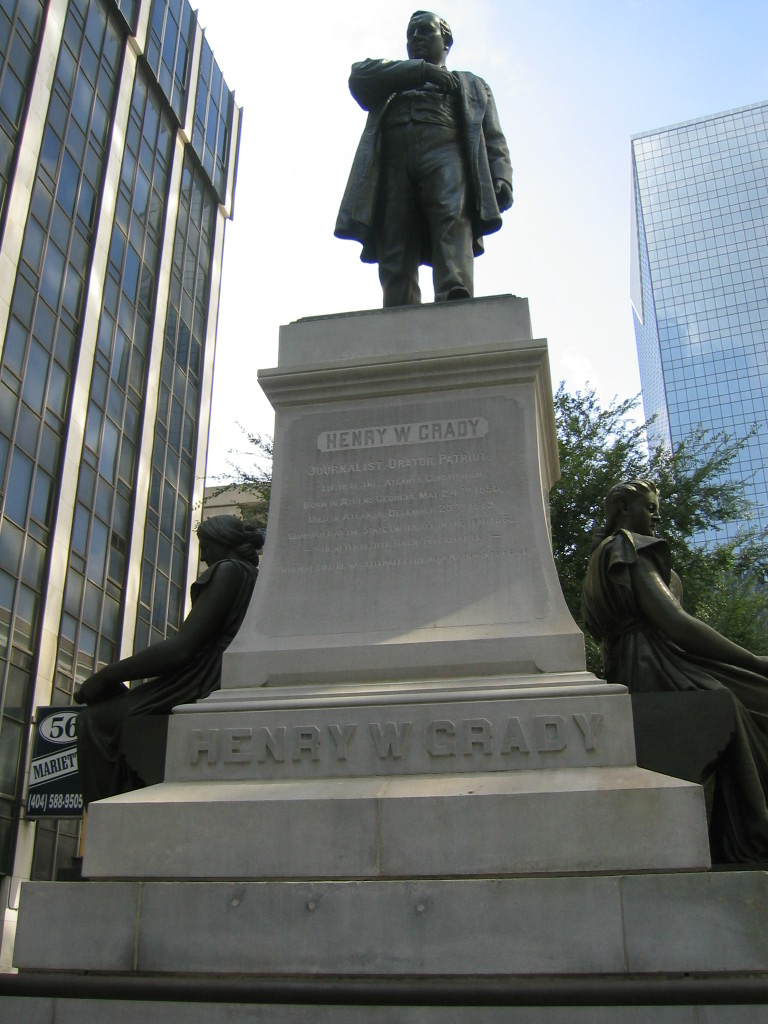
- Henry W. Grady statue (2007).
- Artist: Alexander Doyle
- Completion date: 1891
- Subject: Henry W. Grady
- Location: Henry Grady Square (intersection of Marietta Street and Forsyth Street), Atlanta, Georgia; 33°45′20.2788″N 84°23′28.662″W

The Henry W. Grady statue is a monumental statue of Henry W. Grady in Atlanta, Georgia, United States. Built by Alexander Doyle in 1891, the statue lies at the intersection of Marietta Street and Forsyth Street in downtown Atlanta and was unveiled shortly after Grady's death in 1889. The statue has recently been the subject of controversy, as several groups have called for its removal due to Grady's support of white supremacy.

== History ==
Henry W. Grady was a celebrated orator and newspaper editor during the late 1800s. As editor of the Atlanta Constitution, Grady coined the term "New South" to describe his idea for the Southern United States to develop a more mixed and industrialized economy in the post-Civil War world. He died in 1889 at the age of 39.

On December 24, 1889 (the day after Grady's death) a group of prominent Atlanta men met to discuss the creation of a monument honoring Grady. Within a month, the committee had raised over $20,000 via donations from across the country. Notable donators included Isadore Strauss, Andrew Carnegie, Tammany Hall, and the Singer Sewing Machine Company. On March 1, 1890, an advertisement was put out calling for monument proposals, with American sculptor Alexander Doyle being selected. Doyle completed the casting in 1890, with the bronze statue cast at the Ames Manufacturing Company foundry in Chicopee, Massachusetts. The pedestal was made from granite quarried from nearby Constitution, Georgia.

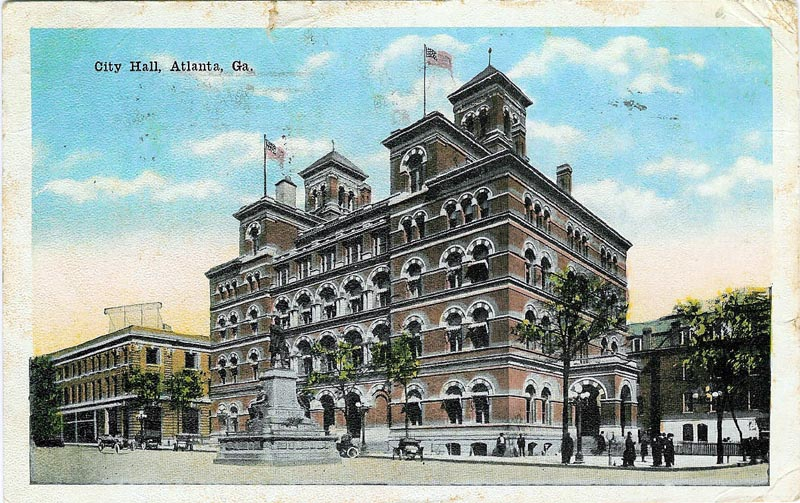
Statue in front of the old city hall, c. 1910

The location for the monument was selected as the intersection of Marietta Street and Forsyth Street, a location sometimes referred to as "Grady Square". The statue was located adjacent to the U.S. Post Office and Customs House, which for a time would serve as Atlanta City Hall. Ground was broken on September 7, 1891. On October 21, 1891, the statue was officially unveiled to the public, attracting a crowd of approximately 25,000 spectators. The statue was unveiled by Grady's daughter, with New York Governor David B. Hill serving as the speaker of the event.

=== Calls for removal ===
In December 2019, an editorial in The Signal, the student newspaper for Georgia State University, called for Atlanta mayor Keisha Lance Bottoms to remove the statue from its position of prominence and relocate the statue to the grounds of the Atlanta History Center. The editorial was signed by Georgia State's student government association, the Young Democrats, and the Black Student Alliance. In the editorial, the writers point out Grady's support of white supremacy, including racist headlines and stories published during his editorship of the Atlanta Constitution, his support for alleged Ku Klux Klan leader John Brown Gordon as Governor of Georgia, and his stance against suffrage for African Americans. While state law forbids the relocation or removal of monuments, the students urged Bottoms to appeal this law and suggested a plaque offering context of Grady be attached to the pedestal of the statue. This came several years after students at the Henry W. Grady High School in Atlanta called for the school to be renamed, citing similar concerns regarding Grady's politics. The school was renamed as Midtown High School.

== See also ==
- 1891 in art
- Removal of Confederate monuments and memorials

== Bibliography ==
- Blair, Ruth (October 1940). "Atlanta's Monuments". Atlanta Historical Bulletin. V (23). Atlanta Historical Society – via Atlanta History Center.
- Bloom, Molly (February 10, 2016). "Atlanta school newspaper calls for renaming Grady High School". The Atlanta Journal-Constitution. Cox Enterprises.
- Garrett, Franklin M. (1969). Atlanta and Environs: A Chronicle of Its People and Events, 1880s-1930s. Vol. II. University of Georgia Press. ISBN 978-0-8203-3905-4 – via Google Books.
- Grem, Darren (January 20, 2004). "Henry W. Grady (1850-1889)". New Georgia Encyclopedia.
- Stirgus, Eric (December 3, 2019). "Georgia State students demand Atlanta mayor move Henry Grady statue". The Atlanta Journal-Constitution. Cox Enterprises.
- "Editorial: Mayor Bottoms, tear down this statue!". The Signal. December 3, 2019.
