= Michael King =

Michael King may refer to the following notable people:

== Entertainment ==
=== Film and television ===
- Michael Patrick King (born 1954), American director, writer and producer
- Michael W. King (born 1952), American producer, writer and director

=== Music ===
- Michael Phillip King (born 1985), musician and member of the pop band King
- Michael Weston King (born 1961), English singer and songwriter

=== Writing ===
- Michael King, pseudonym of American author Meir Kahane (1932–1990)
- Michael King (historian) (1945–2004), New Zealand popular historian, author and biographer

== Religion ==
- Martin Luther King Jr. (1929–1968), born Michael King Jr., American Baptist minister and activist
- Martin Luther King Sr. (1899–1984), born Michael King, American Baptist pastor and missionary

== Sports ==
- Michael King (baseball) (born 1995), American baseball player
- Michael King (golfer) (born 1950), English golfer
- Michael King (footballer) (born 1991), English association football player

== Other ==
- Michael King (commentator) (born 1962), conservative columnist
- Michael King (graphic designer), American graphic designer
- Michael King (politician), Canadian politician
- Michael King (radio host), host of American radio program Home Talk USA
- Michael F. King, original developer of the ProvideX computer language
- Michael Lee King (1971–2026), perpetrator of the murder of Denise Amber Lee
- Delford M. Smith (born Michael King; 1930–2014), American aviator and businessman

== See also ==
- Mick King (1905–1961), Irish hurler
- Mike King (disambiguation)
- The Possession of Michael King, a 2014 American horror film
