= Mike King =

Mike King may refer to the following notable people:

== Sports ==
- Mike King (basketball) (born 1978), American former basketball player
- Mike King (BMX rider) (born 1969), American former professional BMX racer
- Mike King (Canadian football) (1925–2018), Canadian former gridiron football player
- Mike "King" Kelly (1857–1894), American baseball player and manager

== Other ==
- Mike King (advocate) (born 1962), New Zealand mental health advocate, television personality and former comedian
- Mike King (journalist) (born 1950), American journalist and author
- Mike King (politician), former Head of Government of Norfolk Island
- Mike King (radio announcer) (fl. 1999–2013), American radio broadcaster
- Mike King (transportation executive) (fl. 2012–2016), American businessman and Kansas Secretary of Transportation

== See also ==
- Michael King (disambiguation)
- Mick King (1905–1961), Irish hurler
- Mike King Tonight, a New Zealand late-night talk show that aired in 2003
