= Third National Bank =

Third National Bank may refer to:

- Third National Bank (Atlanta, Georgia), now The Metropolitan (Atlanta condominium building)
- Third National Bank (Glasgow, Kentucky), listed on the NRHP in Kentucky
- Third National Bank (Ohio), a predecessor of Fifth Third Bank
- Third National Bank (Syracuse, New York), listed on the NRHP in New York
- Third National Bank (Sandusky, Ohio), listed on the NRHP in Ohio
- Third National Bank in Nashville, incorporated within SunTrust Bank since December 1986
