= Henry W. Grady =

American journalist and orator (1850–1889)

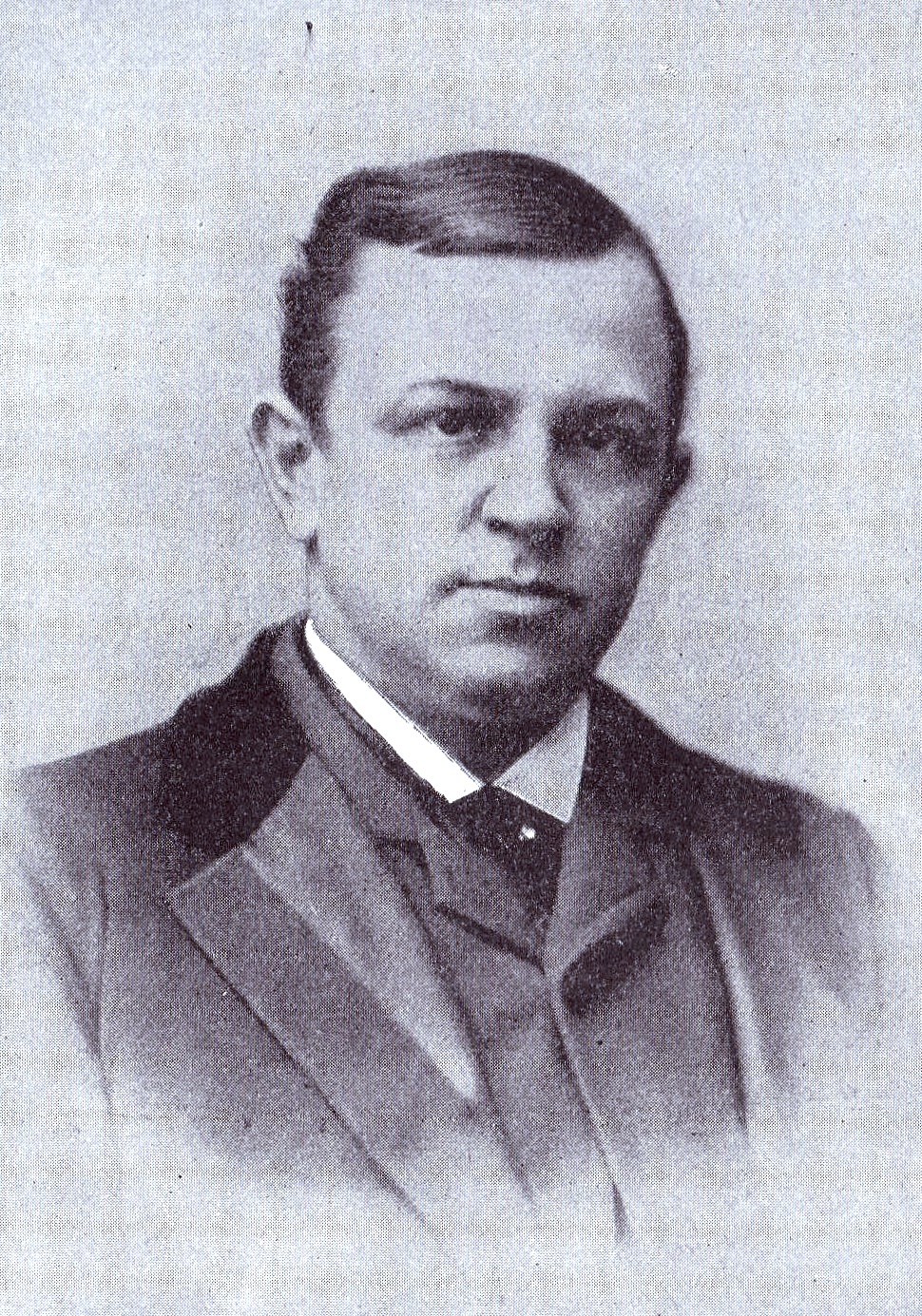
- Born: Henry Woodfin Grady; May 24, 1850; Athens, Georgia, U.S.
- Died: December 23, 1889 (aged 39); Atlanta, Georgia, U.S.

Henry Woodfin Grady (May 24, 1850 – December 23, 1889) was an American journalist and orator who helped reintegrate the states of the Confederacy into the Union after the American Civil War.

Grady encouraged the industrialization of the postbellum South, which Grady referred to as "The New South." By creating his metaphor of the "New South," he voluntarily contributed to "dismantling the advances in rights that Black people had enjoyed during Reconstruction" (Gates 2019, 3-4). He was praised by his contemporaries and by authors Shavin and Galphin as a civic promoter, political strategist, and captivating speaker, and by Atlanta journalist Frederick Allen as a visionary.

However, in modern times, Grady's arguments for the need for white supremacy in the post–Civil War South have resulted in his legacy being seen as mixed and overtly racist. Grady's name has been removed from several schools including Atlanta's former Grady High School. Grady was the father-in-law of Federal Reserve Chairman Eugene Robert Black and grandfather of banker and World Bank President Eugene R. Black Sr.

== Early life ==
As a teenager, Henry Grady experienced fierce Civil War fighting in his home state of Georgia. His father William Sammons Grady was a Confederate States Army officer who died of wounds received at the Battle of the Crater. After his father's death, he was raised by his mother Anne in Athens, Georgia. He was educated in the classical tradition of a southern gentleman of the time at the University of Georgia (Bachelor of Arts in 1868). In 1867, he became a member of the Phi Kappa Literary Society, and later attended the University of Virginia to study law, but became especially interested in the Greek and Anglo-Saxon languages, history, and literature, which led to a career in journalism.

Grady was a charter member of the Eta chapter of Chi Phi at the University of Georgia. In 1882 he was elected as the first Grand Alpha (National President) from the south after the union of the Northern and Southern Orders of Chi Phi in 1871.

== Journalist and editor ==
Upon graduation, he held a series of brief journalistic jobs with the Rome Courier, the Atlanta Herald, and the New York Herald. After working in New York City, Grady returned to the South as a reporter-editor for the Atlanta Constitution.

In 1880, with $20,000 borrowed from Cyrus West Field, Grady bought a one-fourth interest in the paper and began a nine-year career as one of Georgia's most celebrated journalist-publishers. On the business end, he quickly built the newspaper into the state's most influential, with a national circulation of 120,000.

In the tumultuous decades following Reconstruction, when hatreds lingered and many whites worked to re-establish white supremacy, Grady popularized an antithesis between the "old South" which "rested everything on slavery and agriculture, unconscious that these could neither give nor maintain healthy growth," and a "new south" – "thrilling with the consciousness of growing power and prosperity:"

The new South presents a perfect democracy...; a social system compact and closely knitted, less splendid on the surface, but stronger at the core; a hundred farms for every plantation, fifty homes for every palace; and a diversified industry that meets the complex needs of this complex age

as he said in an 1886 speech in New York. His audience included J. P. Morgan and H. M. Flagler at Delmonico's Restaurant, at a meeting of the New England Society of New York.

From 1882 to 1886, along with Nathaniel E. Harris, Grady promoted the founding in Atlanta of the Georgia Institute of Technology (Georgia Tech), a state vocational education school intended to train workers for new industries.

== Orator and spokesman for the "New South" ==
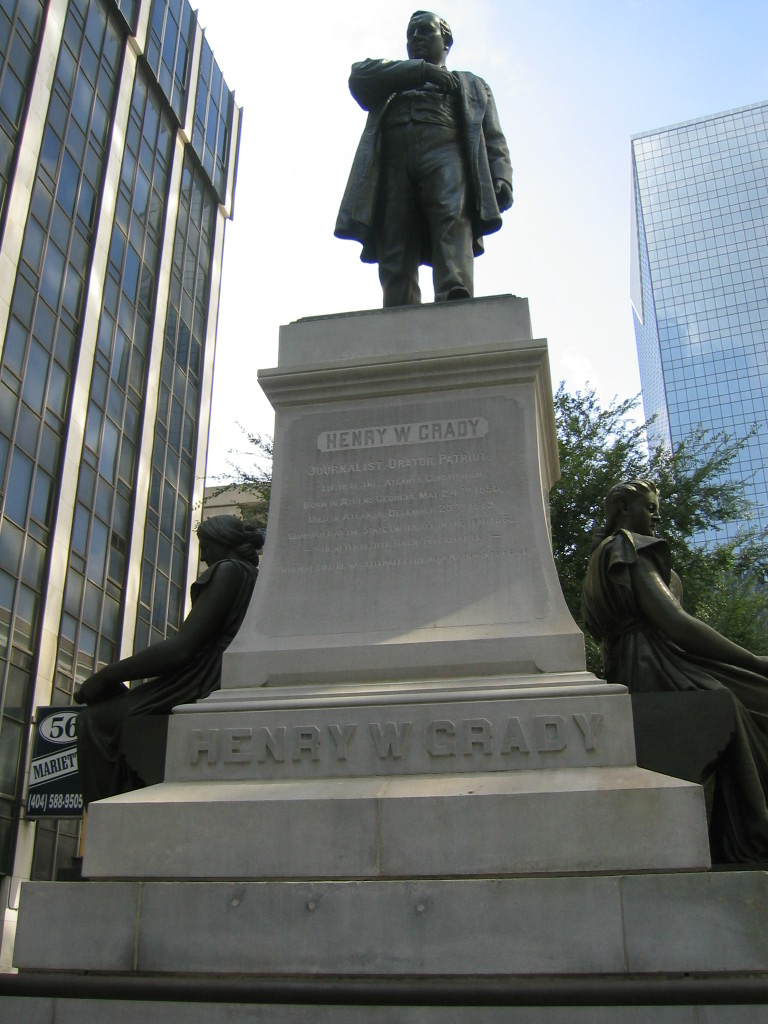
Henry W. Grady statue in Atlanta

Grady was also praised for his great passion for political oratory (he supported Prohibition and a Georgia veterans' home for disabled or elderly Confederate soldiers), commitment to the new peace, and well-known sense of humor. To a large crowd in Boston, Grady said "I am a talker by inheritance: my father was an Irishman and my mother was a woman."

That sense of humor got Grady through more than one difficult situation. Once at a banquet of northern elites, he was waxing eloquent about the brilliant prospects for northern investments in a New South determined to rise from the ashes of defeat. Grady spotted General William T. Sherman in the audience, the celebrated Yankee soldier who was credited with defeating and burning much of Georgia, and particularly Atlanta, on his infamous march to the sea. Without missing a beat, Grady acknowledged the general by noting that the people of Georgia thought Sherman an able military man, "but a mite careless about fire."

In another speech, Grady wanted to gently chastise his Southern audience for what he believed to be Georgia's economic shortcomings. Rather than pounding them with statistics, he entertained them with stories that made the points. He said:

I attended a funeral once in Pickens county in my State. This funeral was peculiarly sad. It was a poor "one gallus" fellow, whose breeches struck him under the armpits and hit him at the other end about the knee—he didn't believe in decollete clothes. They buried him in the midst of a marble quarry: they cut through solid marble to make his grave, yet a little tombstone they put above him was from Vermont. They buried him in the heart of a pine forest, and yet the pine coffin was imported from Cincinnati. They buried him within touch of an iron mine, and yet the nails in his coffin and the iron in the shovel that dug his grave were imported from Pittsburg. They buried him by the side of the best sheep-grazing country on the earth, and yet the wool in the coffin bands and the coffin bands themselves were brought from the North. The South didn't furnish a thing on earth for that funeral but the corpse and the hole in the ground. There they put him away and the clods rattled down on his coffin, and they buried him in a New York coat and a Boston pair of shoes and a pair of breeches from Chicago and a shirt from Cincinnati, leaving him nothing to carry into the next world with him to remind him of the country in which he lived, and for which he fought for four years, but the chill of blood in his veins and the marrow in his bones.

The Georgia Historical Quarterly brought that story full circle, noting Grady's response to the eventual growth of quarries in Pickens County. He boasted that the grave he had so often referenced in his speeches lay less than 100 yards from one of the quarries. Grady believed, according to the Quarterly, that he had lived long enough to see his vision of an industrially independent New South come true.

Grady's prestige reached such a height that he became the only non-member ever to adjourn the Georgia Legislature. It occurred on the election of Grover Cleveland to the presidency. News of the close contest arrived at 11 a.m. during the Legislature's session. In his exuberance, Grady rushed to the Capitol with the announcement. He brushed past the doorkeeper and into the chamber shouting in senatorial tones, "Mr. Speaker, a message from the American people." Sensing the purpose of the intrusion, the Speaker offered Grady a place by his side. However, Grady strode up the aisle to the Speaker's desk, grabbed the Speaker's gavel, and cried out, "In the name of the American people, I declare this House adjourned in honor of the election of the first Democratic President in twenty-five years."

== White supremacy ==
Grady's conception of the New South was based on the social supremacy of whites over blacks, according to his own words: Grady stated in 1888, "the supremacy of the white race of the South must be maintained forever, and the domination of the negro race resisted at all points and at all hazards, because the white race is the superior race... [This declaration] shall run forever with the blood that feeds Anglo-Saxon hearts". This was not the first time that Grady had advocated for the supremacy of whites over blacks. In his 1887 speech to the State Fair of Texas in Dallas, Grady stated:

Standing in the presence of this multitude, sobered with the responsibility of the message I deliver to the young men of the South, I declare that the truth above all others to be worn unsullied and sacred in your hearts, to be surrendered to no force, sold for no price, compromised in no necessity, but cherished and defended as the covenant of your prosperity, and the pledge of peace to your children, is that the white race must dominate forever in the South, because it is the white race, and superior to that race by which its supremacy is threatened.

Some argue other Henry Grady quotes paint a different picture. In December 1886, he opened his famous New South speech by repeating the words of Georgia Senator Benjamin H. Hill: "There was a South of slavery and secession -- that South is dead. There is a South of Union and freedom -- that South, thank God, is living, breathing, growing every hour."

Under Grady's editorial guidance, the Constitution wrote about lynching with levity, condoning and even encouraging it. One headline read, "The Triple Trapeze: Three Negroes Hung to a Limb of a Tree." Another rhymed, "Two Minutes to Pray Before a Rope Dislocated Their Vertebrae." University of Massachusetts Amherst

Journalism Professor Kathy Roberts Forde, sees it this way: "Grady may have united Southern and Northern whites, but he did not unite the country. Rather, he excluded black Americans from the union of North and South and the national democratic project that union represented."

== Death ==
On December 12, 1889, Grady delivered a speech in Boston at Faneuil Hall titled "The Race Problem in the South". Grady was already ill, and the weather was terrible. His health worsened to the point that he barely made it back to Georgia. By the time he made it to the depot at Atlanta, he was too exhausted to appreciate the reception prepared for him and had to be shielded from the crowd and escorted home by his physician.

By December 23, he was diagnosed with pneumonia and died that day at his home in Atlanta. He was buried on Christmas Day 1889, first in a friend's crypt at Oakland Cemetery because of family finances. His body was re-interred at Westview Cemetery when it opened soon afterward.

== Legacy and honors ==
Grady County in Georgia and Oklahoma were named in his honor, as was Grady, Alabama. Places in Atlanta named for him include Grady Memorial Hospital, the now-demolished Henry Grady Hotel, and the Henry W. Grady College of Journalism and Mass Communication at the University of Georgia. Henry W. Grady High School was renamed in December 2020 to Midtown High School, due to Grady's white supremacist philosophy.

The city erected a statue in his honor in 1891. During the 1906 Atlanta race riot, mob members laid the bodies of three of their African-American victims at the base of the statue. As of September 2023 the statue still stands on Marietta Street in the heart of downtown Atlanta. Other places include Henry Woodfin Grady Elementary School in Tampa, Florida. Henry W. Grady Middle School in Houston, Texas, was renamed in 2016.

In 1931 Grady was the first person inducted into the Georgia Newspaper Hall of Fame, memorialized via a bust by artist Steffen Thomas. During World War II the Liberty ship SS Henry W. Grady was built in Brunswick, Georgia and named in his honor.

Grady's family grave site in Atlanta was desecrated in June 2020.

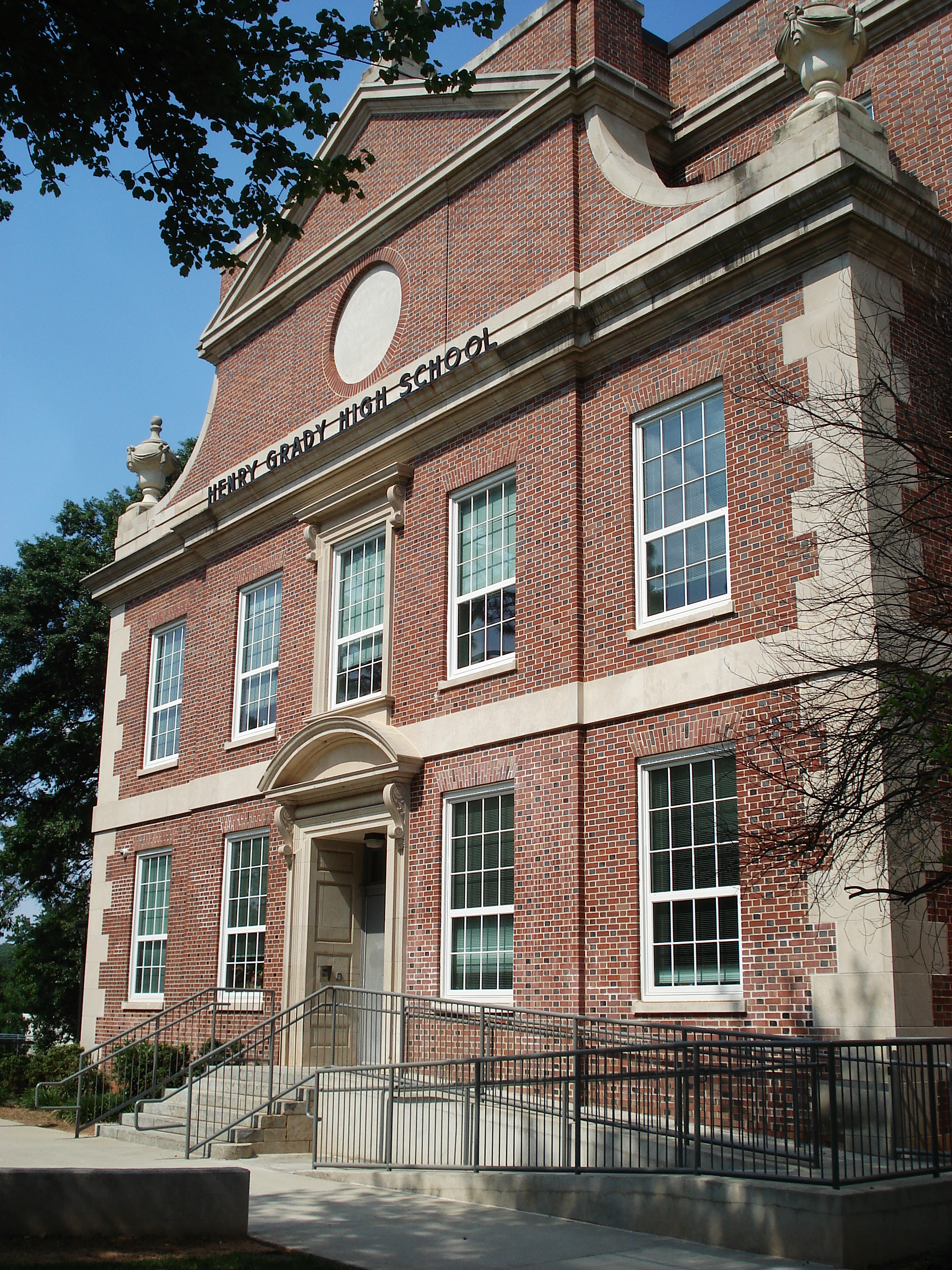
Midtown High School in Atlanta (formerly Henry W. Grady High School)

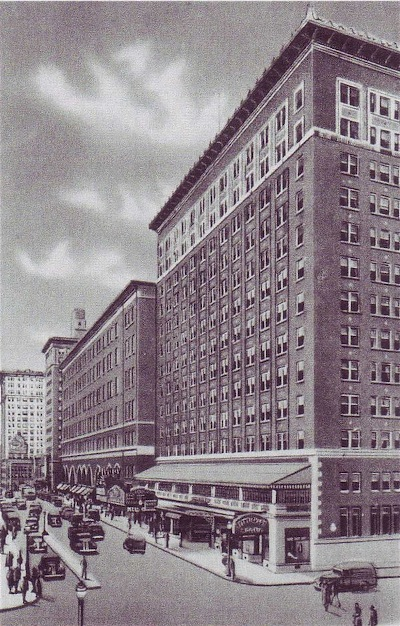
Henry Grady Hotel, 1924–1972

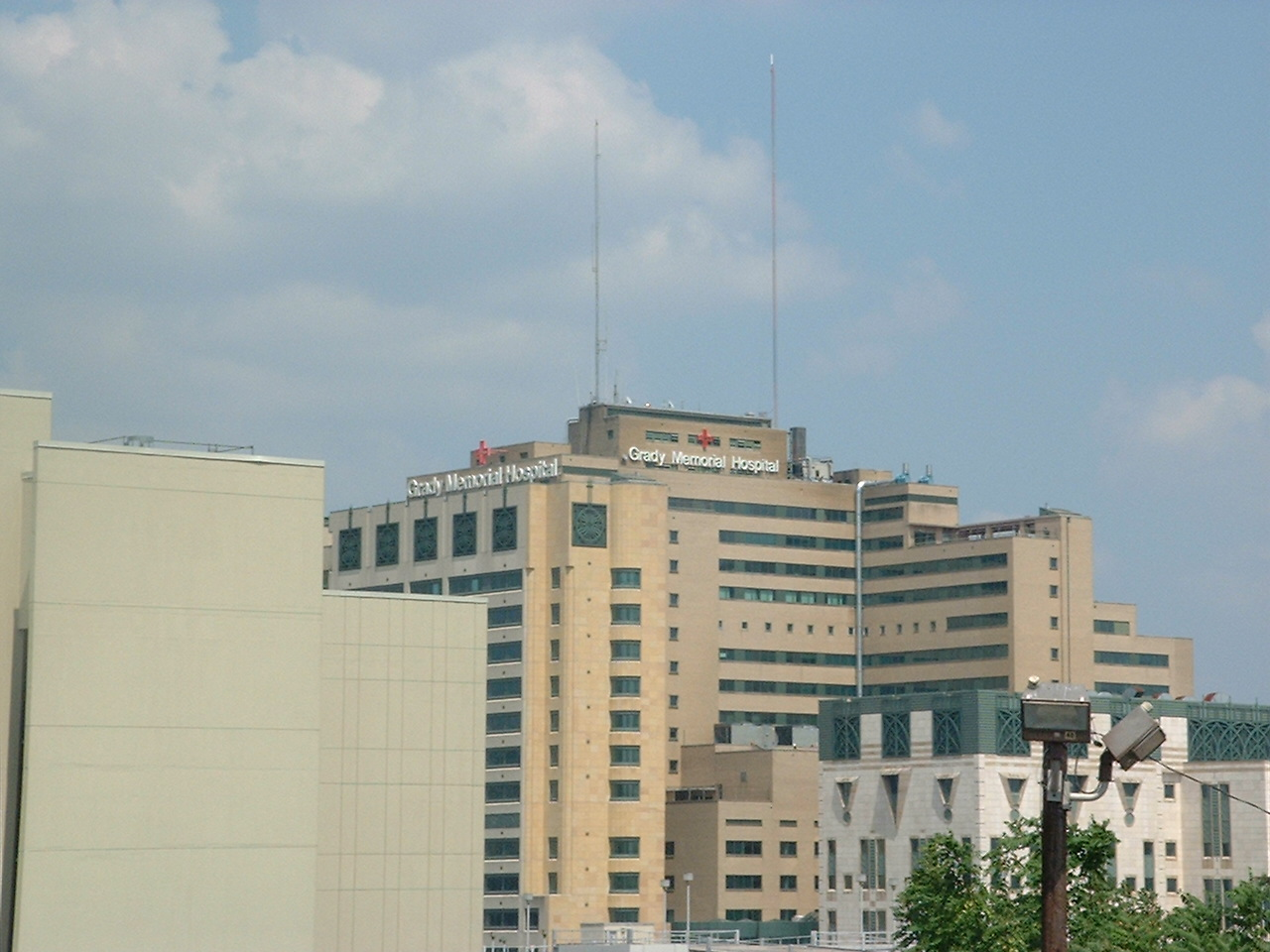
Grady Memorial Hospital
