= United States Post Office and Customs House (Atlanta) =

U.S. Post Office and Customs House
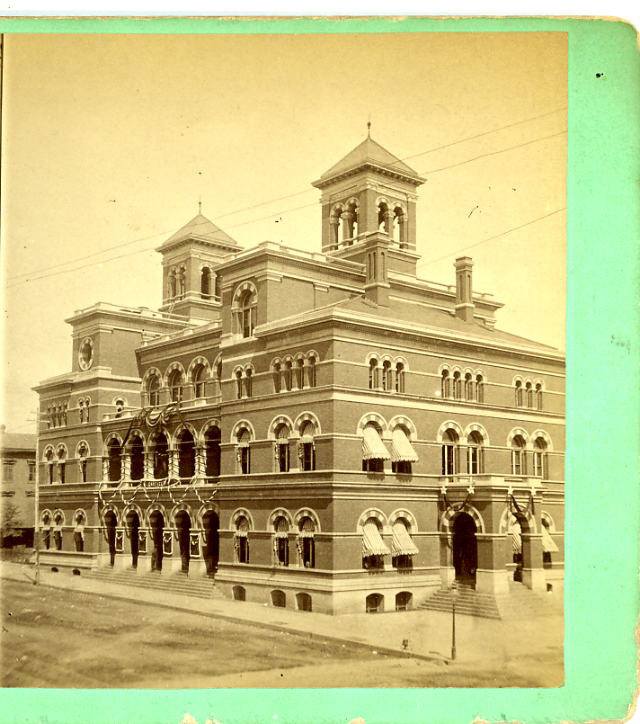
- Interactive map of the U.S. Post Office and Customs House area
- Former names: Atlanta City Hall

General information
- Type: Government offices
- Location: 55 Marietta Street NW; Atlanta, Georgia
- Coordinates: 33.75574°N 84.39103°W
- Completed: 1878
- Demolished: 1930s

Design and construction
- Architecture firm: Thomas G. Healey (1818-1897)

The U.S Post Office and Customs House in Atlanta (also Atlanta's City Hall from 1910 to 1930) was a landmark building located on Marietta Street, occupying the block bounded by Marietta, Fairlie, Walton and Forsyth streets in the Fairlie-Poplar district of Downtown Atlanta. The building opened in 1878. In 1910 the City acquired the building and it was used as the Atlanta City Hall until 1930, after which it was razed. The lot was rebuilt in 1958 as the Fulton National Bank building, now the 55 Marietta Street building.

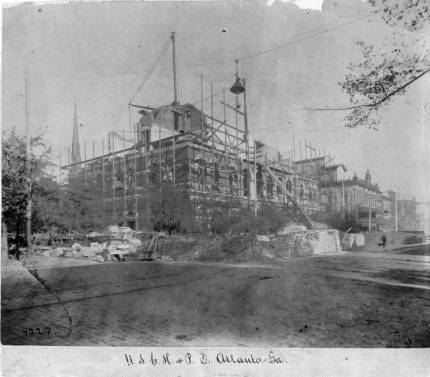
Building under construction, 1870s

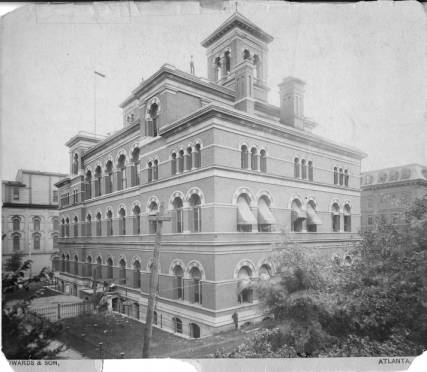
In use as a customs house and post office

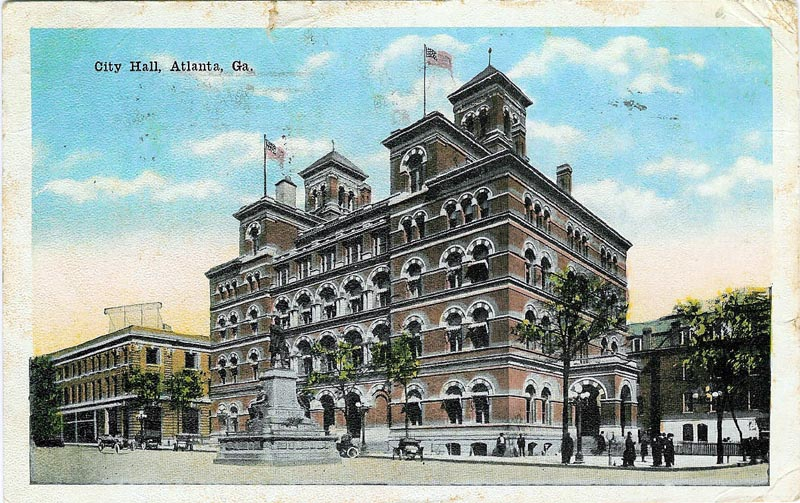
Postcard ca. 1910

== See also ==
- List of United States post offices
