= The Metropolitan (Atlanta condominium building) =

Condominium building in Downtown Atlanta, Georgia

Coordinates: 33.7546°N 84.3906°W

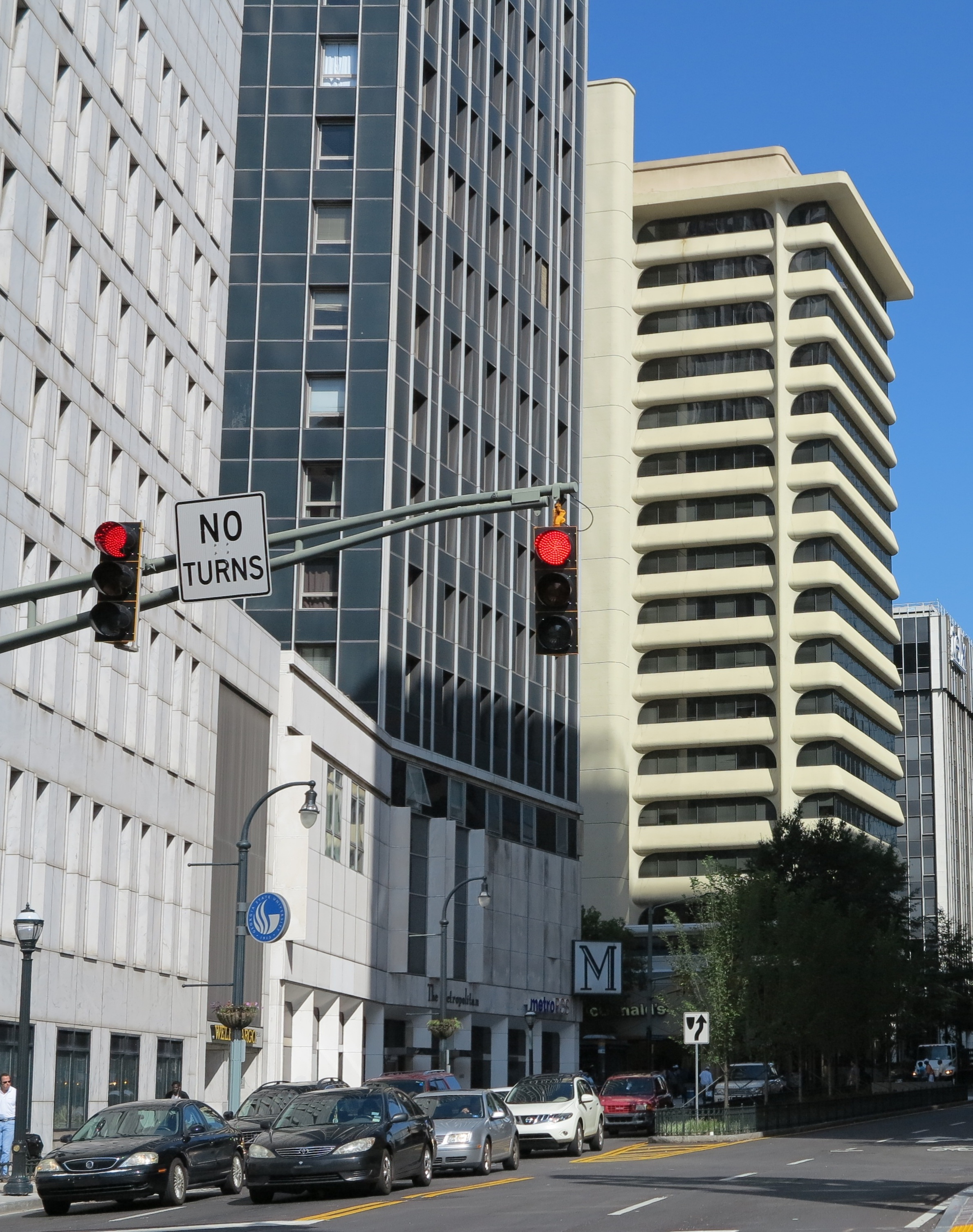
South side of Marietta Street looking northwest from Five Points - left to right: Georgia State's Andrew Young School of Policy Studies, The Metropolitan, and Five Points Plaza.

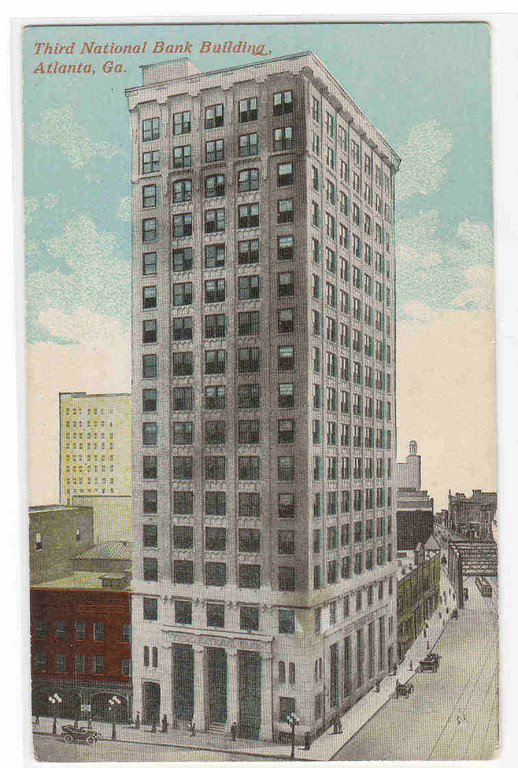
Postcard of Third National Bank Building, 1910s

The Metropolitan is a condominium building at 20 Marietta Street NW at the southeast corner of Broad Street in the Five Points district of Downtown Atlanta. It was built in 1908 as the Third National Bank Building And is Atlanta's first skyscraper. It was later the Atlanta Federal Savings and Loan Building, and in the 1960s was resurfaced with dark glass. It was converted into condominiums in 1996.

== Gallery ==
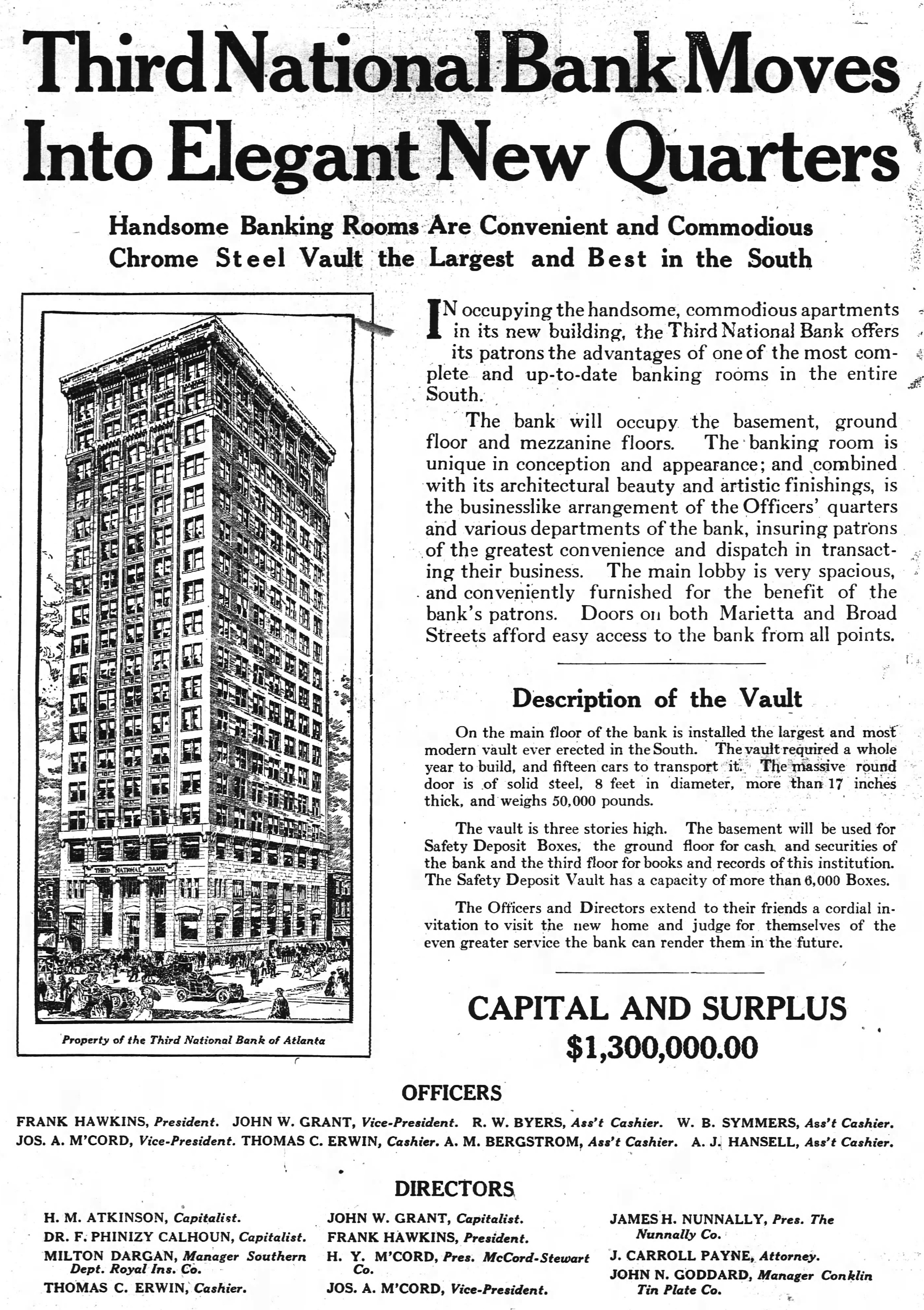
Advertisement for the Third National Bank, Atlanta Constitution, January 28, 1912

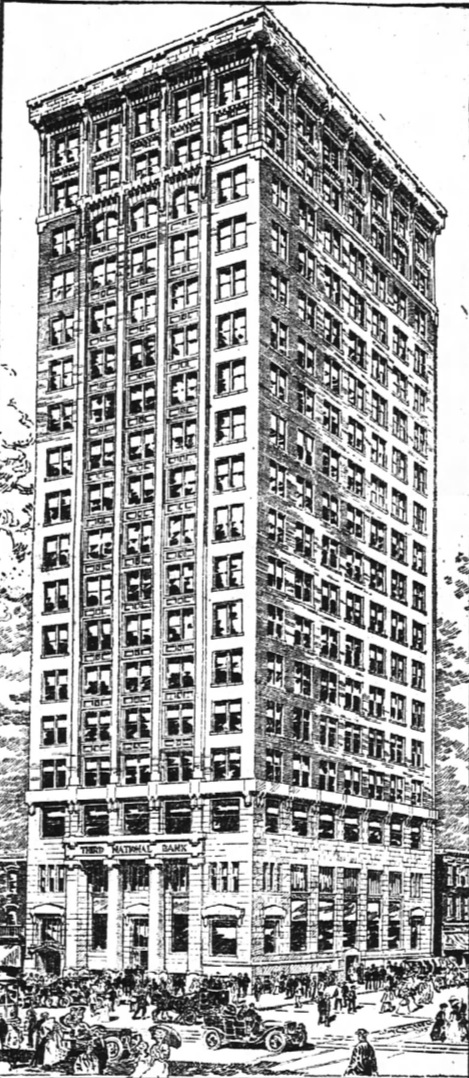
Third National Bank Building, from the same ad in the Atlanta Constitution, January 28, 1912
