= Grady Memorial Hospital =

Public hospital in Atlanta, Georgia

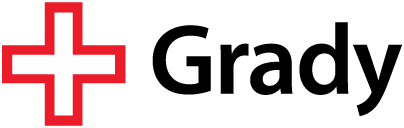

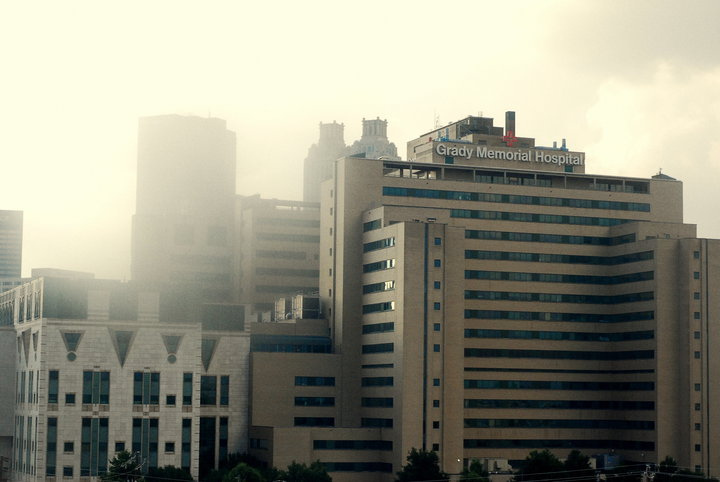

Geography
- Location: Atlanta, Georgia, United States
- Coordinates: 33°45′7″N 84°22′55″W

Organization
- Care system: Public
- Type: General
- Affiliated university: Emory University School of Medicine; Morehouse School of Medicine

Services
- Emergency department: Level I trauma center
- Beds: 989

History
- Founded: 1892

Links
- Website: gradyhealth.org
- Lists: Hospitals in Georgia

Grady Memorial Hospital is a public hospital in Atlanta, Georgia, United States. The hospital is ranked as the tenth largest public hospital in the United States and is a Level I trauma center.

== History ==
Grady Memorial Hospital was founded in 1890 and opened in 1892, as an outgrowth of the Atlanta Benevolent Home. It is named for Henry W. Grady, an Atlanta Constitution journalist and later owner who became a major force in Georgia politics and advocated for a public city hospital. At the time of opening, the hospital officially had 14 rooms. The original building (at the corner of Jesse Hill Jr Dr SE and Coca-Cola Place) is now on the National Register of Historic Places and is known as Georgia Hall, where the hospital's human resources staff now work. The second Grady Hospital (at Butler Hall) opened in 1912 and was for whites only, with blacks being segregated at the Atlanta Medical College. The third hospital was at Hirsch Hall and the current location is its fourth. From 1945 until 2008, the hospital was run by the Fulton/DeKalb Hospital Authority.

The current facility was also built as a segregated institution, with one section serving whites (Wings A & B; facing the city) and another section serving African Americans (Wings C & D; facing the opposite direction). Even though it is a single building, and the two sides are connected by a hallway (Wing E), the facility was referred to in the plural ("The Gradys") during the years of segregation.

In 2007 and 2008, journalist Mike King of the Atlanta Journal-Constitution wrote a series of "Saving Grady" editorials – dozens of pieces over eighteen months – during the time when Grady Memorial Hospital was nearly insolvent and in danger of closing.

=== Infant abductions ===
Seven infants were abducted from Grady from 1978 to 1996, which was more than from any other hospital in the United States during that time period. Five were recovered within hours or weeks of their abduction. An additional child was abducted from the home of his mother after the kidnapper followed her from Grady. The abductions were covered on season three of the podcast The Fall Line.

=== Problems and restructuring ===
In 2008, Grady Memorial Hospital was made into a non-profit organization. Numerous foundations have pledged hundreds of millions of dollars to revitalize it. Michael Young has become a chief executive officer. He was formerly the CEO of Erie County Medical Center Corp. in Western New York, University of Buffalo tertiary center. Prior to that, Young served for 16 years as president and CEO of the three-hospital, 530-bed Lancaster General Hospital & Health System in Lancaster, Pennsylvania.

In February 2013, it was announced that Grady's net profit was $20 million and that 200-300 jobs had been added at the hospital in the preceding 18 months.

=== 2008 tornado ===
On March 14, 2008, the buildings of Grady sustained minor damage when a tornado tore through downtown Atlanta. Historic Georgia Hall was the hardest hit, with windows blown out, a collapsed chimney, and water damage. The main hospital had a few cafeteria windows blown out, but never lost power. It was the first tornado to hit the downtown area since local weather record-keeping began in the 1880s. Nine people were taken to Grady for treatment, one of whom had critical injuries.

== Service ==
The hospital serves a large proportion of low-income patients and is supported almost entirely by Fulton and DeKalb counties, with little help from the suburbs or state, despite serving all of metro Atlanta's several counties. The hospital relies almost entirely on Emory University School of Medicine and Morehouse School of Medicine to provide doctor and resident staffing. As an editorial in The Atlanta Journal-Constitution said, "When you read the phrase 'Grady doctor,' do a silent translation, because those words really mean either 'Emory doctor' or 'Morehouse doctor.'"

Grady Hospital's ambulance service, Grady EMS, shares 9-1-1 responsibility for Fulton County, Georgia. The Downtown Connector (Interstate 75/85) makes a large bend around the hospital on its otherwise due north–south route, dubbed the "Grady Curve" on traffic reports.

== Notable patients ==
On August 11, 1949, Gone with the Wind author Margaret Mitchell was hit by a speeding car while crossing Peachtree Street with her husband on the way to a movie. She was knocked unconscious and was taken to Grady. X-rays showed that her skull was fractured from the top of her head all the way down to her spine and her pelvis was shattered. She never regained consciousness, and died five days later at Grady, on August 16, 1949. The driver, who had 23 prior traffic violations, was thought to be drunk and was convicted of involuntary manslaughter and served an 11-month jail term.

In 2001, actor Whitman Mayo, who played the character Grady on television's Sanford and Son, died of a heart attack at Grady.

Grady Hospital gained national attention for treating supermodel Niki Taylor after her near-fatal car accident on April 29, 2001, in which she suffered severe liver trauma. Its effectiveness as a level I trauma center was highlighted by this incident. Several press conferences were held outside the hospital discussing the gravity of her injuries and her slow recovery following more than 50 surgeries.

Grady again gained attention after the Bluffton University bus accident in which seven died. The hospital cleared an entire wing for the injured victims and their families.

== In media ==
CNN's medical correspondent Dr. Sanjay Gupta, who is Associate Chief of Neurosurgery at Grady, filmed a documentary at the hospital called Grady's Anatomy (a play on Grey's Anatomy) that aired in 2007 for CNN Special Investigations Unit. The documentary focused on four young medical residents and the daily stress of a large hospital practice.

In AMC's The Walking Dead, Grady Memorial became a major setting for several episodes of the show's fifth season in 2014. However, none of the series' scenes were filmed at the actual hospital.

== See also ==
- List of public hospitals in the United States
