= Voodoo Doughnut =

American doughnut company

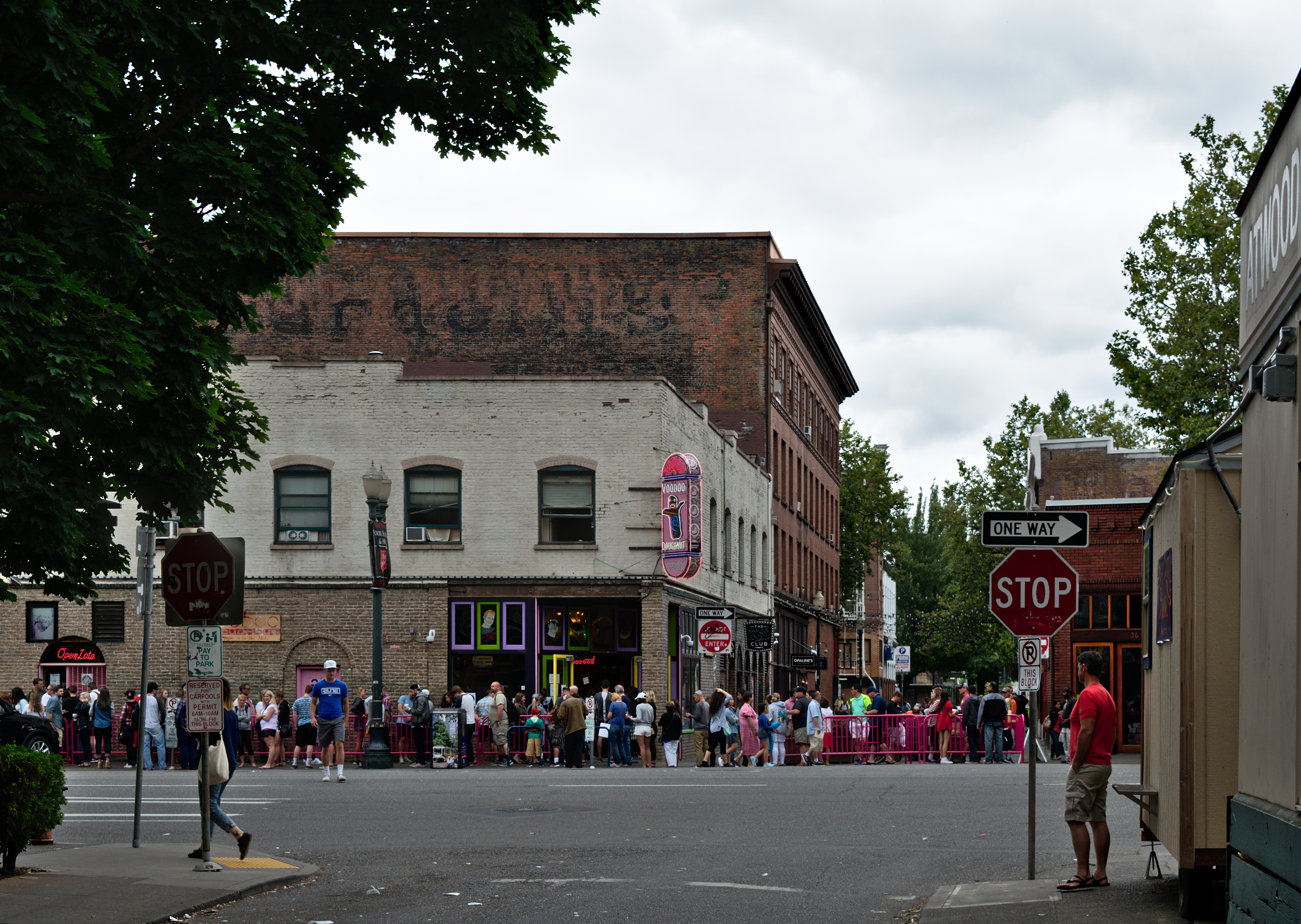
- The exterior of Voodoo Doughnut's flagship location in Portland, Oregon

Restaurant information
- Established: May 2003; 23 years ago
- Owners: Fundamental Capital; Kenneth "Cat Daddy" Pogson; Richard "Tres" Shannon
- Food type: Doughnuts
- Dress code: Casual
- Location: United States
- Other information: "The Magic is in the Hole"
- Website: www.voodoodoughnut.com

Voodoo Doughnut is an American doughnut company established in 2003 in Portland, Oregon with various chain store locations around the United States.

== History ==
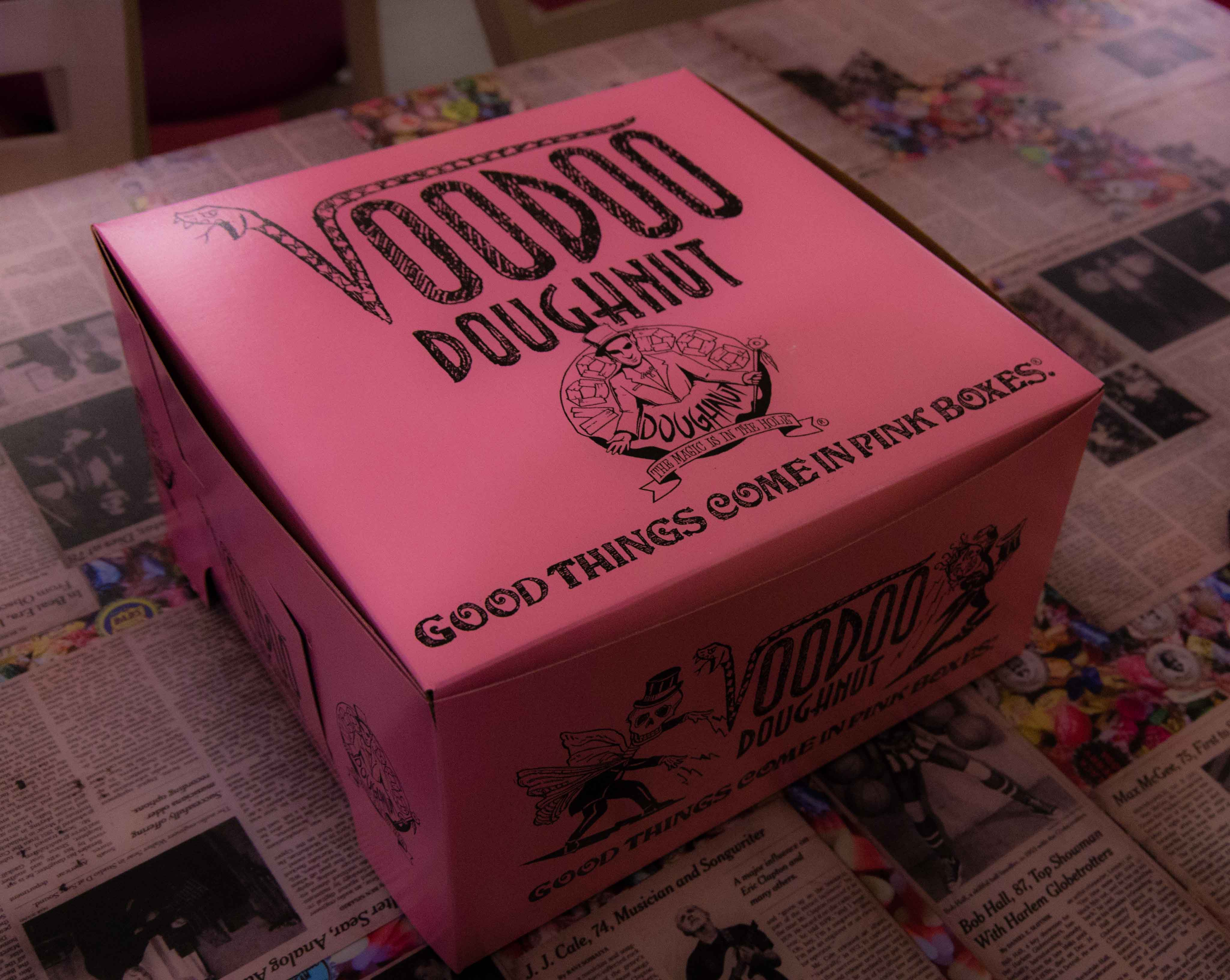
Pink Voodoo Doughnut box

Voodoo Doughnut was founded in May 2003 by Kenneth "Cat Daddy" Pogson and Richard "Tres" Shannon, with the first shop that opened on Southwest Third Avenue in Old Town Portland.

The company logo was designed to include a depiction of Baron Samedi, a figure from Haitian Vodou. The use of pink boxes by the company and the slogan "Good things come in pink boxes" began after Pogson traveled to California and observed the use of pink boxes for doughnuts.

Until 2006, the business was only open at night. In 2007, the shop was featured in an episode of Anthony Bourdain: No Reservations.

In 2008, Pogson and Shannon opened Voodoo Doughnut Too on Northeast Davis Street in Portland. A parade was held that traveled from the original location to the new one. Voodoo Doughnut Tres opened in Eugene, Oregon in 2010.

On December 24, 2008, Voodoo Doughnut's Portland Crème doughnut was designated Portland's "Official City Doughnut" by a resolution introduced by Portland Mayor Tom Potter and passed by the City Council.

During early 2011, combined sales at the Portland locations were estimated to have been about twenty tons of doughnuts per week in the summer. In spring 2011, the original shop was remodeled to add space from an adjacent building, mostly to expand the kitchen. By 2011, the two Portland shops and the shop in Eugene were open 24 hours a day. The Portland shops were also hosting legal weddings and commitment ceremonies.

In August 2011, Voodoo Doughnut staff constructed a large version of its box at the Portland Bridge Festival, and filled it with doughnuts until it weighed 666 pounds (302 kg), a number chosen to fit what Shannon described as the company's "voodoo theme," which became a Guinness World Record for the largest box of doughnuts.

Shannon, a Voodoo Doughnut shop, and bacon maple doughnuts appeared in Episode 4 of Season 2 of Portlandia, which aired in January 2012. In the Portlandia-crossover episode of The Simpsons titled The Day the Earth Stood Cool that aired on December 9, 2012, Voodoo Doughnut is parodied as "Devil Doughnuts."

Between 2011 and 2016, Voodoo Doughnut partnered with Rogue Ales to create bottled beer based on several of its doughnut flavors, that were then distributed across the United States.

The Portland location has hosted doughnut-eating contests for mayoral candidates, including in 2016.

Plans to open a location in the French Quarter of New Orleans were cancelled after it faced resistance from voodoo practitioners and historic preservationists in the summer of 2023. They criticized the company's name and iconography and declared them ethnically and religiously insensitive.

== Operations ==
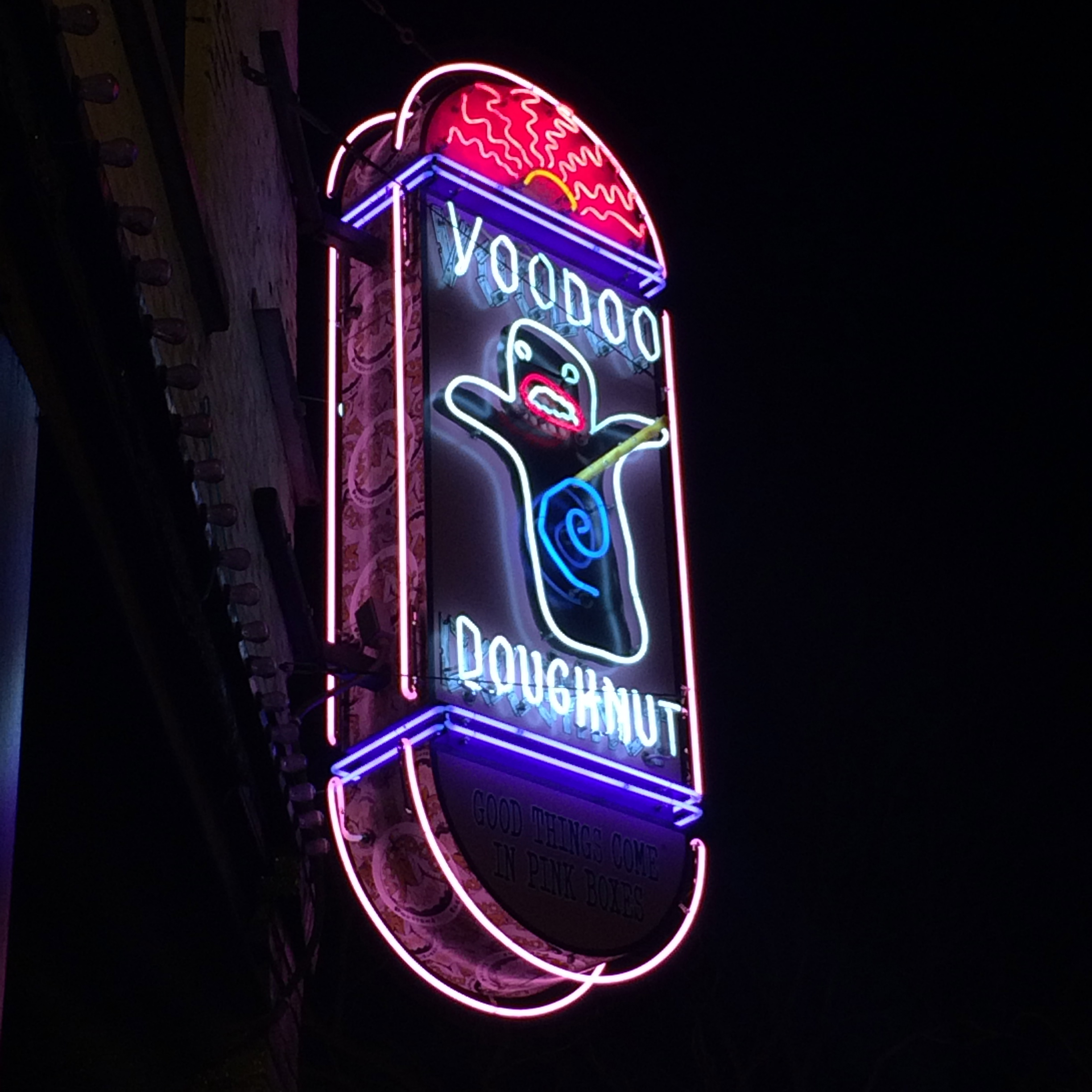
Voodoo Doughnut neon sign, Portland, Oregon

In 2017, a majority share of Voodoo Doughnut was sold to the private equity firm Fundamental Capital. Pogson and Shannon retained an ownership interest, and members of Fundamental Capital joined the company board.

Chris Schultz, who previously worked as an executive at MOD Pizza and Starbucks, became the CEO in 2018.

By 2023, the company had expanded into a multi-state chain with stores in California, Colorado, Florida, Washington and Texas in addition to multiple locations within Oregon.

=== Labor relations ===
In 2020, workers at the downtown Portland location began an effort to unionize and formed an organization called the Doughnut Workers United. Requests for increased security was one of the things sought by the union following an incident involving a man armed with a hatchet in March 2020. Their efforts to officially unionize and have the organization recognized by the company's management failed after a tie vote in June 2021, but organizers vowed to try again. The National Labor Relations Board certified the results of the election on June 21, 2021.

During a record-setting heatwave in June 2021, most of the Southwest Third Avenue shop employees held a walkout to protest what they said were unsafe working conditions, beginning on Sunday, June 27 at 1 pm, and continuing through the next day. Employees reported a 96 degrees Fahrenheit temperature inside, and one said he felt close to passing out from the heat during previous shifts; on the second day of the walkout, Portland set a record high temperature at 116 degrees Fahrenheit outside. Seven of the 11 employees who participated in the walkout were later fired. On October 6, 2021, the National Labor Relations Board (NLRB) ruled the firings were wrongful and ordered Voodoo Doughnut to reinstate the fired employees and to pay the employees back pay from the time of their wrongful terminations. The NLRB also ruled Voodoo Doughnut had improperly surveyed employees during a drive to organize a union.

Employees at the store filed for a new election with the National Labor Relations Board in August 2022. At the time, they were seeking improved wages, better and more consistent scheduling, and increased safety standards in the wake of robberies and attacks on employees at the location. In October 2022, a second vote passed 16–6. The workers are now affiliated with Doughnut Workers United, part of the IWW.

== Doughnuts ==
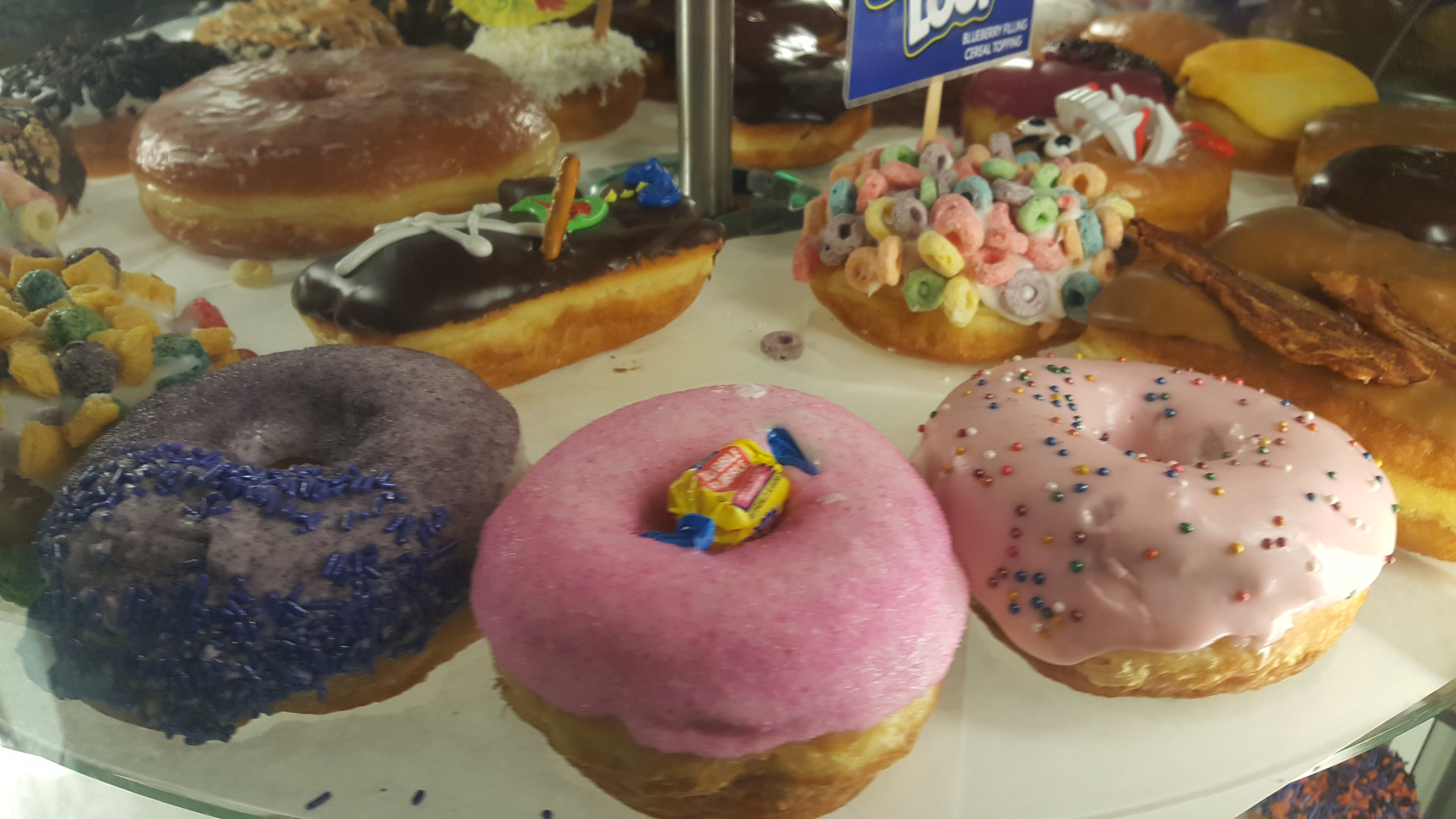
Various doughnut varieties

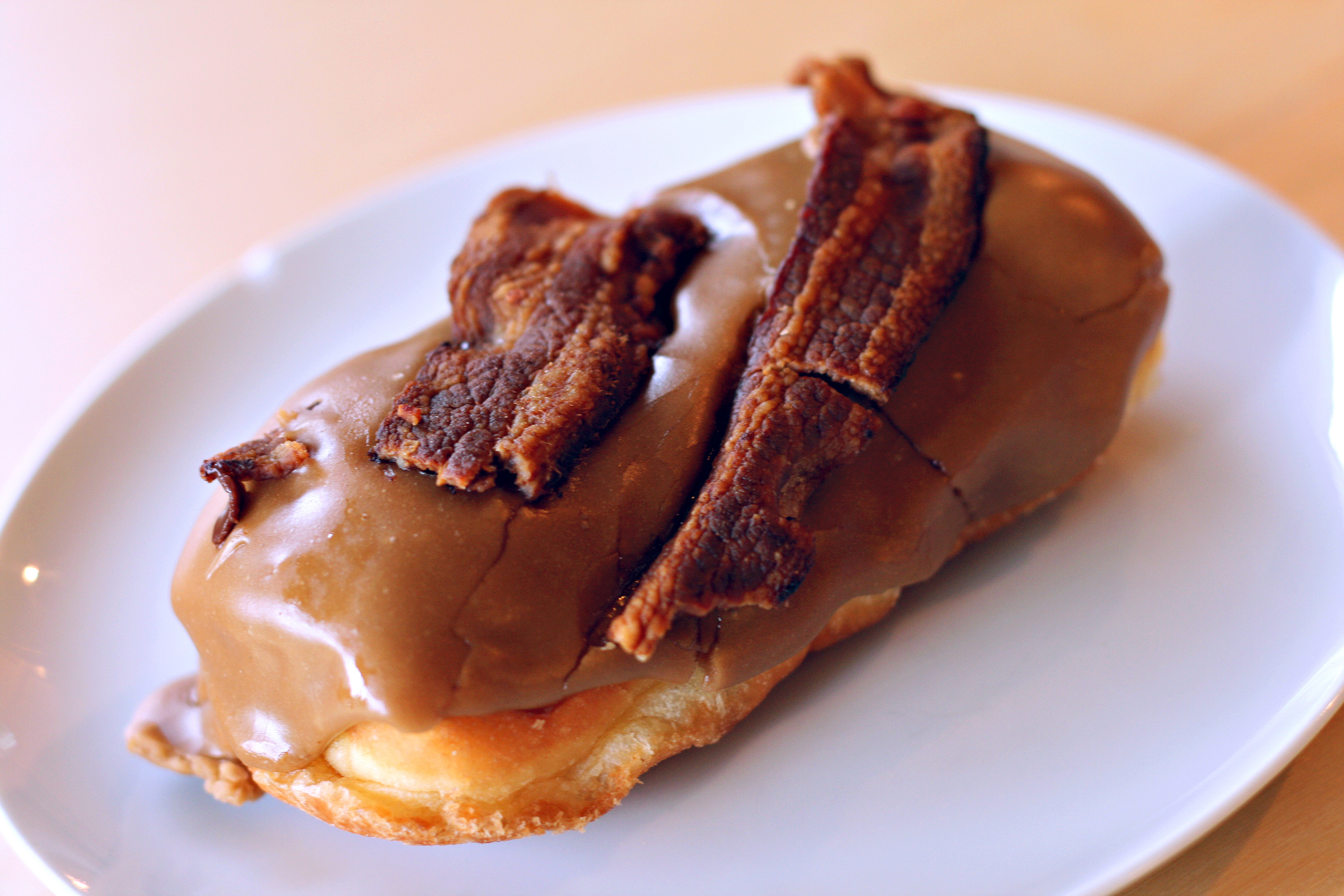
Bacon Maple bar

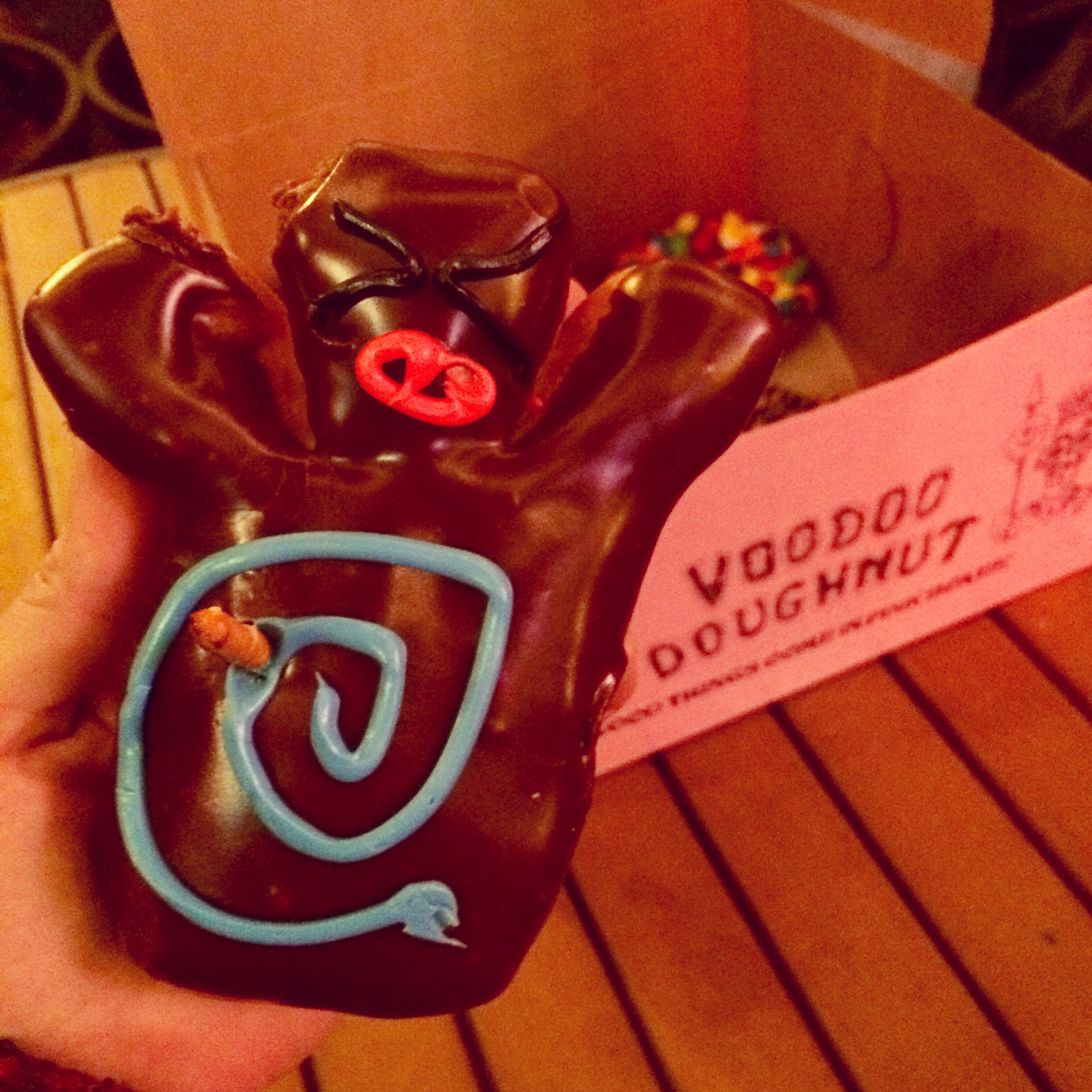
"Voodoo Doll" doughnut

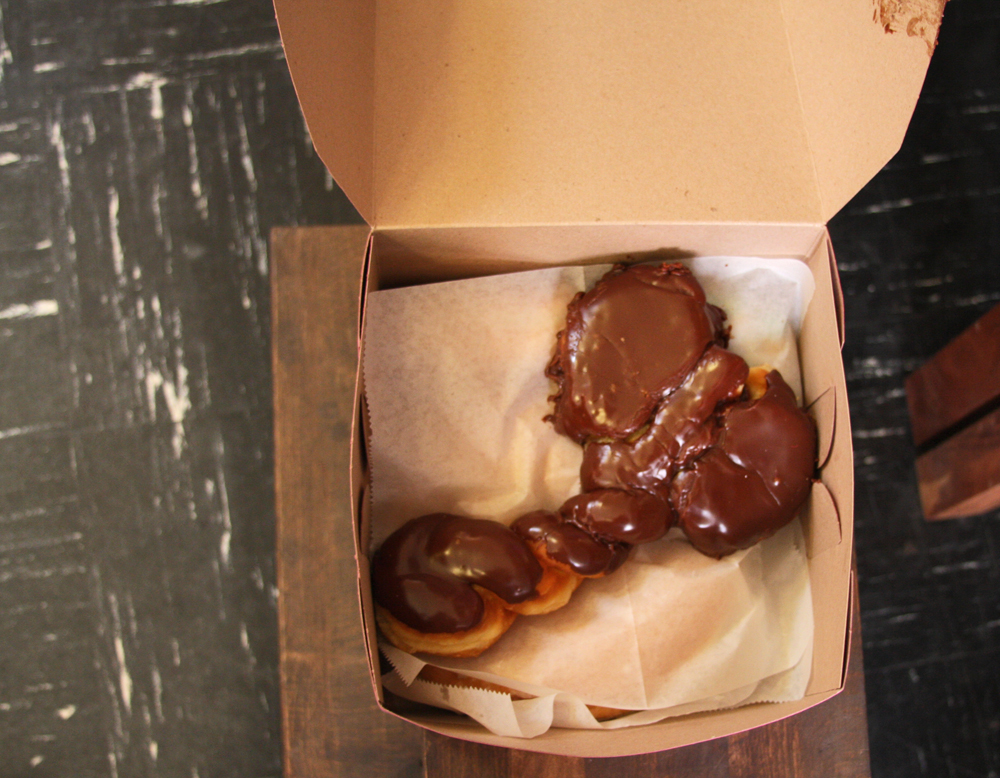
"Cock and Balls" doughnut

Voodoo Doughnut offers dozens of doughnut varieties, including vegan doughnuts. Two of their past doughnuts, the NyQuil Glazed doughnut and the Vanilla Pepto Crushed Tums doughnut, were no longer available by 2006 due to a warning from local health officials.

The "Doughnut of Love" was created for use in wedding ceremonies performed at Portland shop locations, and in 2011 was described by Abby Sewell of the Los Angeles Times as "a terrifying concoction piled high with sprinkles, chocolate chips and pretzel sticks."

Voodoo Doughnut also made the "Tex-Ass," a doughnut weighing about a half-pound, described on the company website as the equivalent of six regular-sized doughnuts, that until 2017 was advertised with a challenge to consume it within 80 seconds. The challenge prize was a commemorative pin and not having to pay for the doughnut. In April 2017, an eating contest participant choked and died in the Denver Voodoo Doughnut lobby. The eating challenge was suspended following this incident.

Limited edition doughnuts have also been made, including as tributes to public figures, some for sale and others for display in the shop. Specialty doughnuts are sometimes connected to donations made by the company to nonprofit organizations, with a portion of sales proceeds from certain doughnuts donated to an organization.

=== Reception ===
Timothy Malcolm, the dining editor for Houstonia Magazine, discussed nine doughnuts in a 2020 review of the Houston location, and ranked the Bacon Maple Bar first, followed by the "Voodoo Doll", "Old Dirty Bastard", "Viscous Hibiscus", Blueberry Cake, "School Daze 'PB&J'", "Marshall Mathers", and "Maple Blazer Blunt", with "Tangfastic", a variety made for Houston because of NASA and Tang's connection, ranked last and described as "Sugar overload. Way too much to handle."

Mike Sutter, a restaurant critic for the San Antonio Express-News, provided his opinion in 2023 of the ten best and worst doughnuts after he ate the more than 40 available at the San Antonio location. According to Sutter, the best were "The Homer", "Grape Ape", "Voodoo Doll", "Memphis Mafia", Maple Old Fashioned, and Blueberry Cake, and the worst were "Voodoo Bubble", "Viscous Hibiscus", "The Dirt", and Raised Glazed. Sutter also commented on the "Cock and Balls" doughnut, stating, "It weighs like 10 pounds, gets its own box, costs $6.50 and looks like a penis."

For the Tempe, Arizona, location, dining reporter Bahar Anooshahr of The Arizona Republic tried doughnuts from a regular dozen box in 2023, and in her review, wrote, "Overall, the cake doughnuts at Voodoo are the winners to my taste," and "If you're only going to order one doughnut here, make it the blueberry."

== Voodoo Doughnut Recordings ==
In 2014, Shannon and Pogson began the record label Voodoo Doughnut Recordings. According to Shannon, the general idea was to produce doughnut-related music, and "it's an extension of advertising the brand in a way we all enjoy, with music and vinyl." Early novelty acts included The Deep Fried Boogie Band and The Doughnut Boys. The label expanded operations to include remastered versions of recordings made by Shannon in the early 1990s while he was an owner of the X-Ray Cafe in Portland. In 2018, Shannon said record label operations were slowing down.

== See also ==
- Michael King (graphic designer), Voodoo Doughnut logo
- List of doughnut shops
