= 55 Marietta Street =

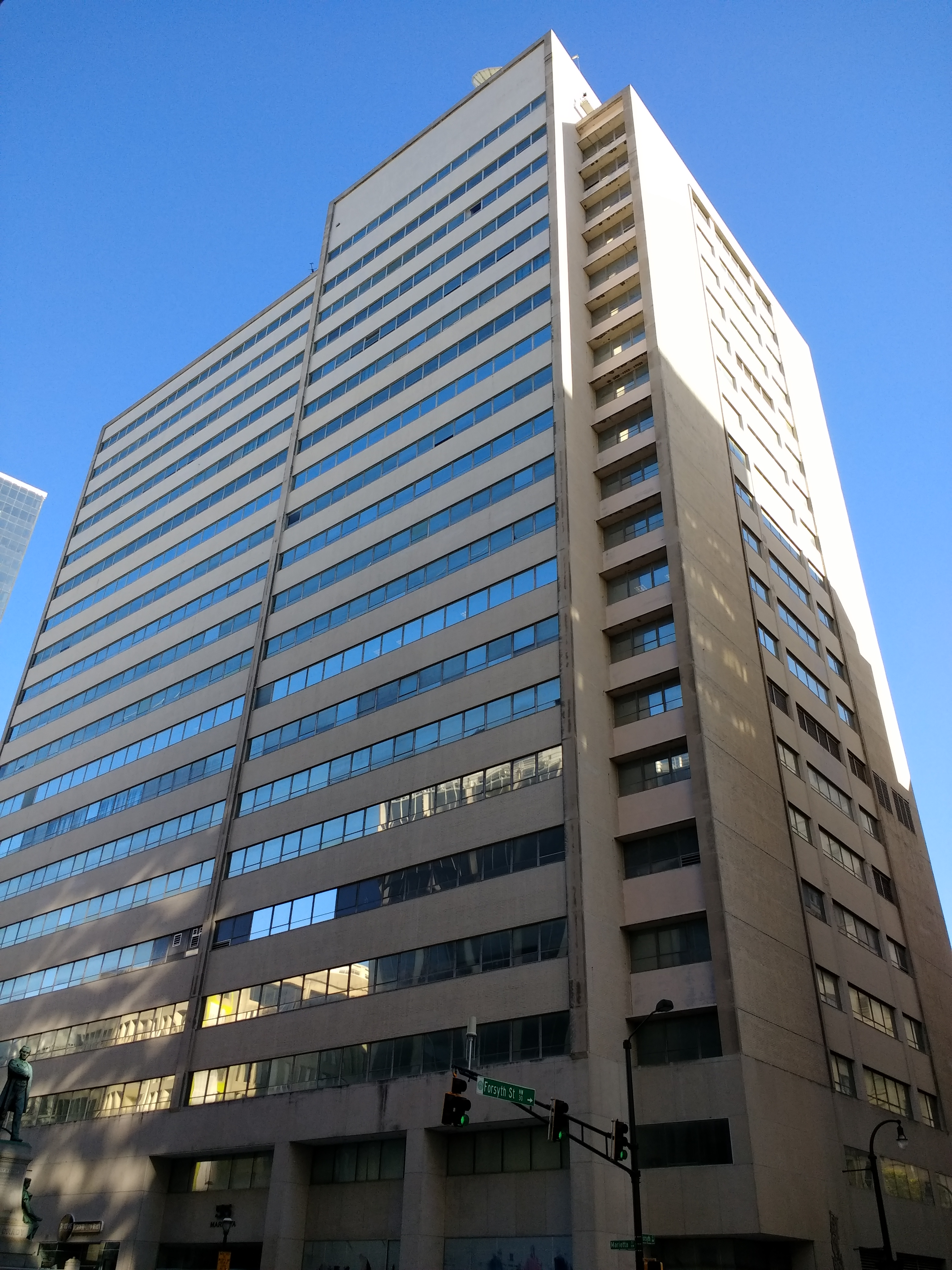
- Interactive map of the 55 Marietta Street area
- Former names: Bank South Building; Fulton National Bank Building

General information
- Type: Commercial offices
- Location: 55 Marietta Street NW; Atlanta, Georgia
- Coordinates: 33.75574°N 84.39103°W
- Completed: 1958

Height
- Roof: 89.92 m (295.0 ft)

Technical details
- Floor count: 21

Design and construction
- Architect: Wyatt C. Hedrick
- Main contractor: Henry C. Beck Company

55 Marietta Street, formerly the Fulton National Bank Building and the Bank South Building, is a 21-story, 89.9 m (295 ft) office building in Atlanta, Georgia. It was the tallest building in the city when completed in 1958 until surpassed by One Park Tower in 1961. 55 Marietta Street is the site of the U.S. Post Office and Customs House (built 1878), which served from 1910 to 1930 as City Hall (demolished 1930s)

== See also ==
- List of tallest buildings in Atlanta
