= Marietta Street =

Historic street in Downtown Atlanta

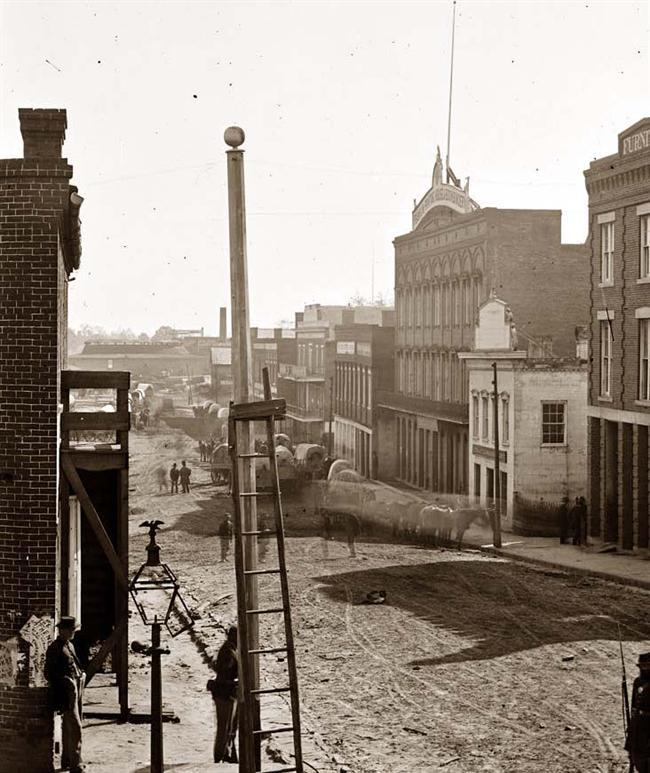
Marietta Street, 1864

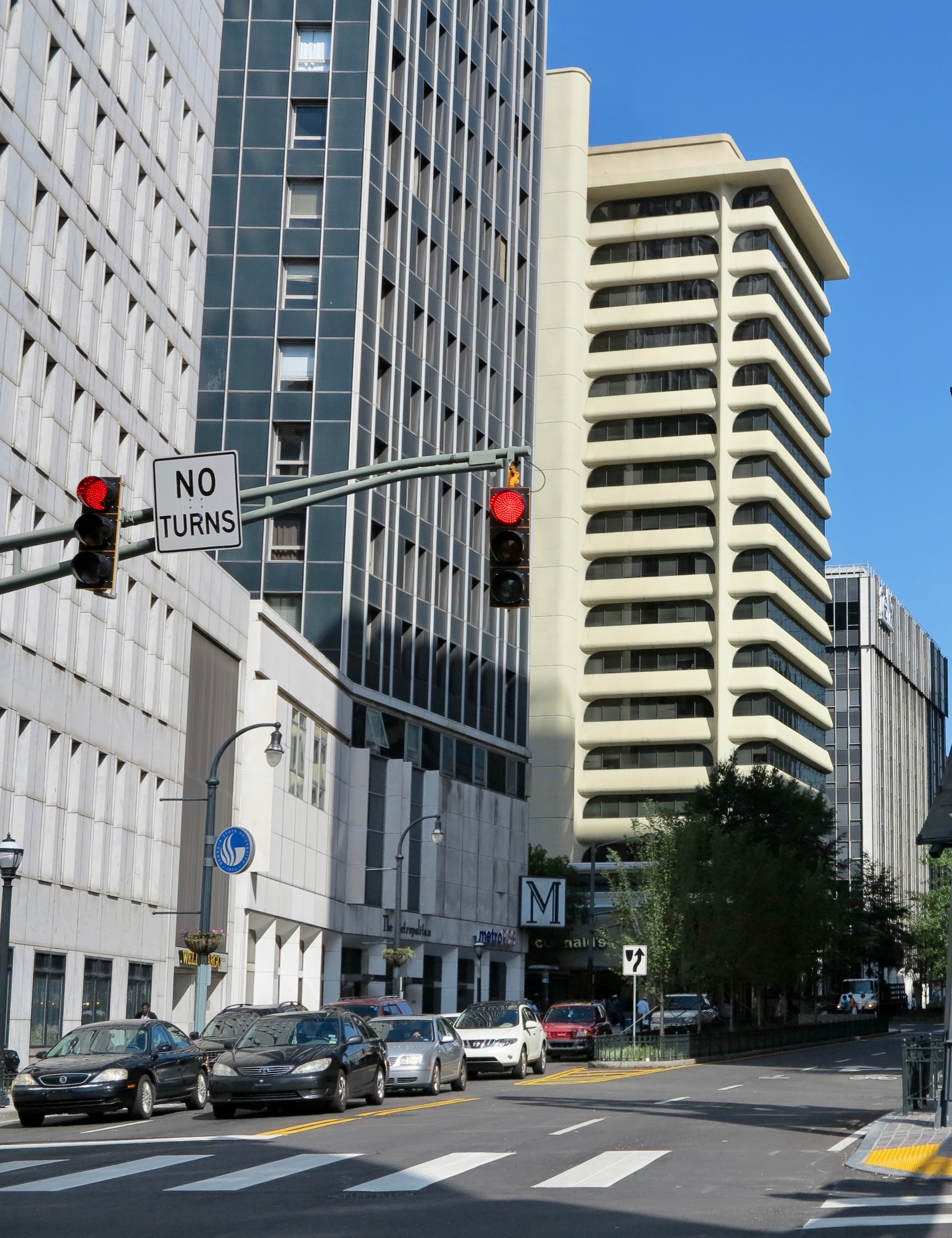
Looking northwest up Marietta Street from Five Points

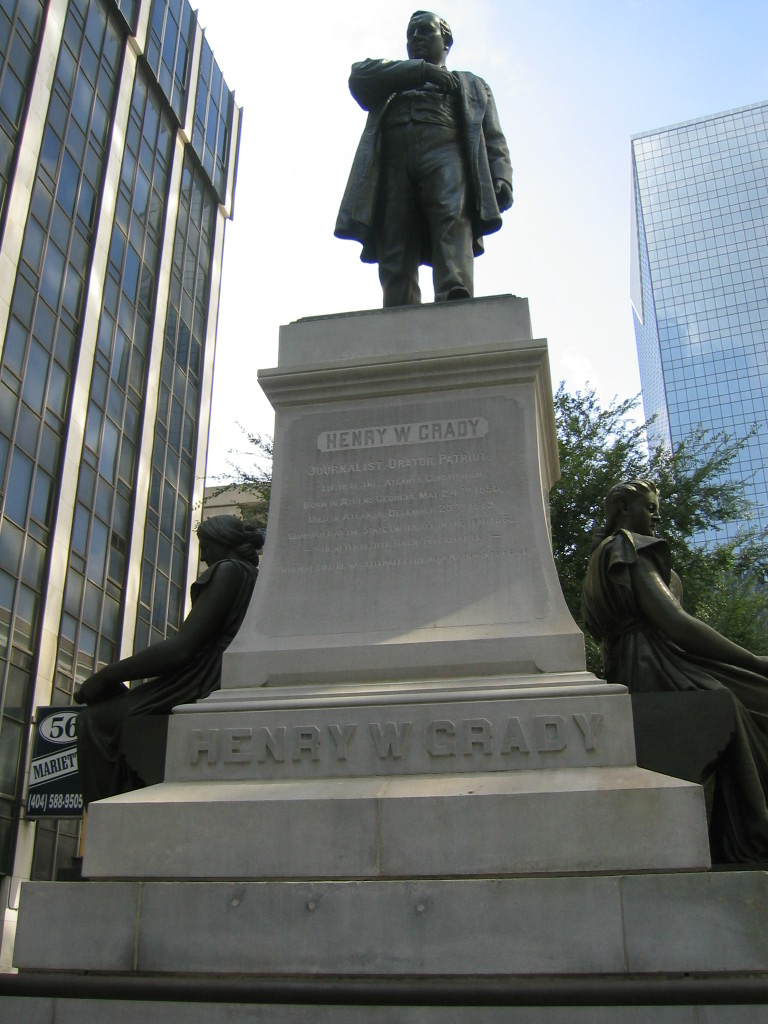
Henry W. Grady statue in the median at Forsyth St.

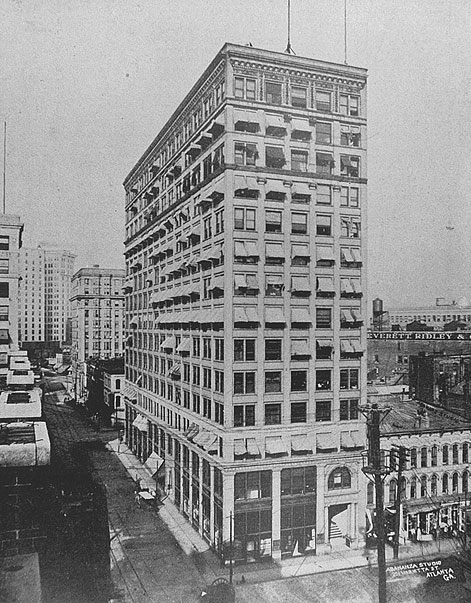
Empire Building (built 1901) now the J. Mack Robinson College of Business Administration Building

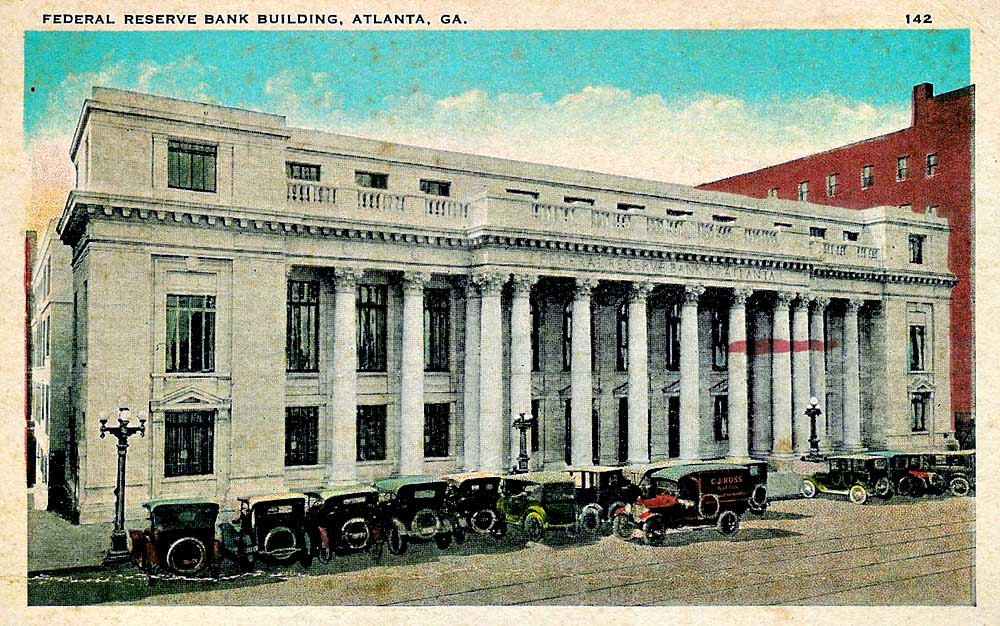
Federal Reserve Bank of Atlanta, now the State Bar of Georgia building, early 1920s

Marietta Street is a historic street in Downtown Atlanta, Georgia, United States. The street leads from Atlanta towards the town of Marietta, as its name indicates. It begins as one of the five streets intersecting at Five Points, leading northwest, forming the southern border of Downtown's Fairlie-Poplar district, continuing through Downtown's Luckie Marietta district, then entering West Midtown's Marietta Street Artery neighborhood, until terminating at its junction with West Marietta St., Brady Ave., and 8th St.

Marietta street is one of the original seven streets in Atlanta, along with Decatur, Whitehall, Peachtree, Pryor, Loyd (now Central), and Alabama.

Before the American Civil War, the finest residences were located on both sides of Marietta Street, extending westwards from Five Points for about a mile. In the first years of the 20th century, several of the city's tallest skyscrapers were built on Marietta Street, and a concentration of financial companies were headquartered on the street, such as the Third and Fourth National Banks of Atlanta, and later, the Atlanta Trust Company and Citizens & Southern National Bank.

Notable buildings and sites, from Five Points northwestwards, include:

- Georgia State University's Andrew Young School of Policy Studies, formerly the Fourth National Bank (built 1905, 2—4 Marietta St.)
- The Metropolitan (Atlanta condominium building), formerly the Third National Bank (built 1911, 20 Marietta St.)
- J. Mack Robinson College of Business Administration Building, formerly known as the Empire Building, then the C&S Bank Building (built 1901, 35 Broad St., siding onto Marietta)
- Five Points Plaza (built 1964, 40 Marietta St.)
- 55 Marietta Street, formerly the Fulton National Bank, then Bank South; tallest building in the city 1958–1961
- Henry W. Grady statue in the median just northwest of Forsyth Street
- Walton Place building (built 1907, 75 Marietta St.)
- Centennial Tower (built 1975, 101 Marietta St.)
- State Bar of Georgia Building (built 1918, expanded 1920 and 1922, 104 Marietta St.)
- CNN Center
- Centennial Olympic Park

Notable buildings no longer standing include:

- Norcross Building (4 Marietta St. – current location of the Andrew Young School of Policy Studies
- 48 Marietta St. (NE corner of Forsyth St.), where President Woodrow Wilson had his law offices starting in 1881(building demolished, site currently occupied by 56 Marietta St. building)
- 55 Marietta St. was the site of the United States Post Office and Customs House (built 1878), which served from 1910–1930 as City Hall (demolished 1930s)

See also Marietta Street Artery for notable industrial architecture in the northern reaches of Marietta Street.
