= Mike King (journalist) =

American journalist and author (born 1950)

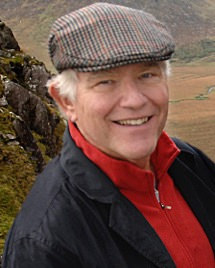
- Mike King
- Born: October 26, 1950 (age 75); Jeffersonville, Indiana, United States
- Occupations: Journalist, author

Mike King (born October 26, 1950) is an American journalist and author. King spent most of his newspaper career working at The Courier-Journal in Louisville, Kentucky, and at The Atlanta Journal-Constitution. He is the author of Spirit of Charity: Restoring the Bond between America and Its Public Hospitals, which was published in 2016.

== Life and career ==
King graduated from Indiana University Southeast in 1972 with a degree in political science. He also attended Georgetown University in Washington and Bellarmine University in Louisville While in college, King was a sportswriter for his hometown newspaper, The Evening News, covering high school sports.

In the summer of 1972 he worked as an intern at The Courier-Journal and stayed in the newspaper business in a variety of positions until his early retirement from the Journal-Constitution in December 2008. During his 15 years in Louisville, King was a reporter, editor, Washington correspondent, and medical writer. While there, he won awards from the National Mental Health Association and the American Heart Association, among others. In the early 1980s he was among the first Washington-based reporters to document the tobacco industry's efforts to pitch products to teenagers, young adults, and minorities.

When returning to Louisville in 1984, King became the Courier-Journal's chief medical writer. Here he gained national recognition for his coverage of Dr. William DeVries' artificial heart experiments, particularly their move from the University of Utah in Salt Lake City to Louisville's Humana Hospital-Audubon. These experiments garnered worldwide coverage and King appeared on NPR, the BBC and other major news outlets while they were taking place. The U.S. Food and Drug Administration shut down the experiments when one patent died shortly after surgery and the other Louisville patients suffered severe complications.

In 1987 King joined the Atlanta Journal-Constitution's science and medicine staff covering health disparities and policy issues at the state and national level. Among his first assignments was covering trauma care in Atlanta and at Grady Memorial Hospital.

In 1991, he and Hal Straus were the first newspaper reporters in the U.S. to examine death rates and access to care in every county in the South. The series of stories, In Sickness and in Wealth, documented large differences in health care outcomes and death rates among poor blacks in South Carolina, Georgia, Alabama, and the Mississippi Delta region, and among poor whites in the Appalachian mountain region of Kentucky, Tennessee, and West Virginia. The report was the first to use computer-generated data and mapping techniques to illustrate health disparities. The stories won awards from advocacy groups around Georgia as well as the annual "Best of Cox" Newspapers Group.

In 1991, King became science and medicine editor and in that position helped direct Journal-Constitution science writer Mike Toner's 1993 Pulitzer Prize-winning series in explanatory journalism about antibiotic resistance in medicine and agriculture. In 1992, he was named metro editor. During his tenure as metro editor, the newspaper's reporting staff focused attention on numerous cost overruns, charges of cronyism and other problems connected to the $300 million renovation and expansion at Grady Memorial Hospital. King was named Executive Metro editor in 1998 coordinating efforts between the newsroom, circulation and advertising departments of the newspaper to expand the newspaper's reach. In 2000 he became the newspaper's second public editor, where he handled reader concerns about accuracy and fairness in coverage in a weekly column. In his final four years at the Journal-Constitution he joined the newspaper's editorial board, specializing in opinions about medicine and health policy issues and First Amendment issues. He also was a weekly columnist in the opinion pages.

In 2007 and 2008, he wrote a series of "Saving Grady" editorials – dozens of pieces over eighteen months – during the time when Grady Memorial Hospital was nearly insolvent and in danger of closing. His editorials and columns outlined the scope of the problem with Georgia's largest public hospital and proposed solutions. His work helped prompt an examination of the roles state and local governments should play in addressing the issue of indigent care funding at Grady Memorial Hospital.

After leaving the newspaper in December 2008, King was a freelance magazine writer and provided advocacy writing and editing for groups such as Habitat for Humanity International and the American Cancer Society.

He began research on his book, A Spirit of Charity, after the Affordable Care Act (ACA) passed in 2010. But it was not until the 2012 U.S. Supreme Court decision that made Medicaid expansion voluntary by the states that the scope of the book – how the poor always seem to be left out in health care reform efforts – started to take shape. A Spirit of Charity, published by Secant Publishing, uses Grady Memorial Hospital in Atlanta as its primary focus, but also includes histories of four other large public hospitals – Parkland Memorial in Dallas, Jackson Memorial in Miami, County Hospital in Chicago and the now closed Charity Hospital in New Orleans.

In 2016, King blogs on health care news and policy issues.

King has been an active volunteer with his local Habitat for Humanity affiliate. Here he has served on the board as well as serving as chair of the board.
