= Mike King (graphic designer) =

American graphic designer

Michael King
- Known for: Graphic design

Michael King is an American graphic designer from Portland, Oregon. His career started in the late 1970s, when he started making concert posters for local punk bands in Portland. King's work includes an album cover for Jack Johnson, posters for Pink Martini, and the Voodoo Doughnut logo. He founded Crash Design America, a graphic design company in Portland.
