= Five Points Plaza =

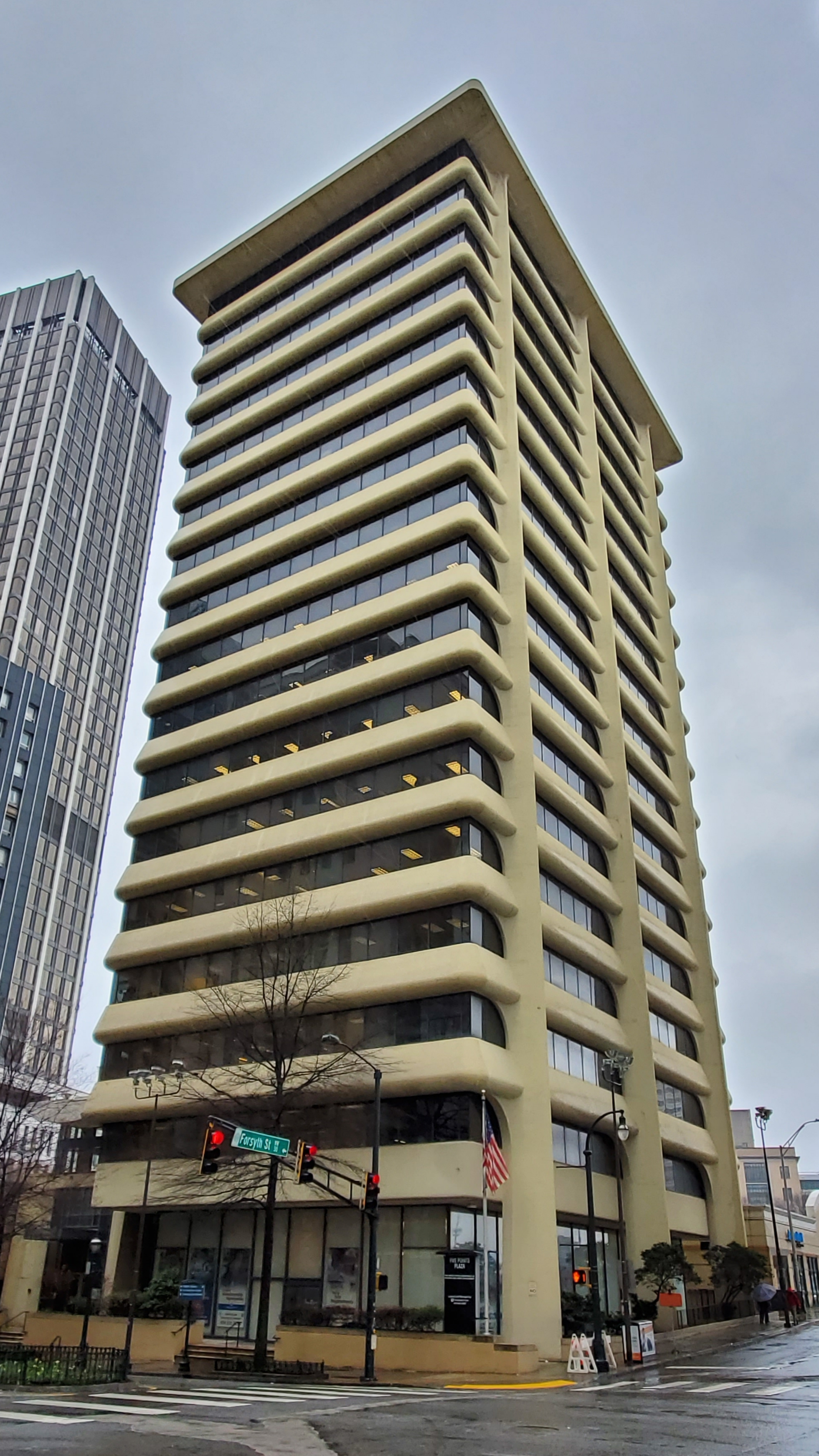
- Five Points Plaza in 2020
- Former names: First Federal Building, 40 Marietta Street

General information
- Type: Commercial offices
- Location: 40 Marietta Street NW; Atlanta, Georgia
- Coordinates: 33.755091°N 84.390841°W
- Completed: 1964

Height
- Roof: 73 m (240 ft)

Technical details
- Floor count: 17
- Floor area: 122,503 sq ft (11,380.9 m^{2})

Design and construction
- Architect(s): Tomberlin and Sheets
- Main contractor: Barge and Company

Five Points Plaza, also known as 40 Marietta Street and formerly known as First Federal Building, is a 17 story, 73 m (240 ft) office building skyscraper in Atlanta, Georgia. The building was constructed in 1964 to house headquarters of the First Federal Savings and Loan Association of Atlanta. Noted for an Oriental architectural design that stands out in Atlanta, the building is devoid of interior columns, making it one of the tallest post-tensioned concrete buildings in the United States at the time of its construction. Five Points Plaza is fully leased to the Atlanta offices of the Department of Housing and Urban Development through 2019.

== See also ==
- Architecture of Atlanta
