= Mick King =

Irish hurler

Personal information
- Native name: Mícheál Ó Cionga (Irish)
- Born: Castlegar, County Galway

Sport
- Sport: Hurling
- Position: Forward
Club
- Years: Club
- Castlegar
Inter-county
- Years: County
- 1923-1935: Galway
Inter-county titles
- Connacht titles: 0
- All-Irelands: 0
- NHL: 1

Mick King (1905 – 15 March 1961) was an Irish sportsperson. He played hurling with his local club Castlegar and with the Galway senior inter-county team from 1923 until 1935. In 2000, King was posthumously named on the Galway Hurling Team of the Millennium.

== Playing career ==
=== Club ===
King played his club hurling with his local club in Castlegar, however, he enjoyed little success. Although Castlegar are the most successful club in the Galway county championship, King had retired from hurling just one year before the club won their first county title.

=== Inter-county ===
King first came to prominence on the inter-county scene with Galway in 1923. That year the county won the All-Ireland title for the first time, however, King was not a member of the team.

In 1924, Galway reached the All-Ireland final once again, however, King played no part in the defeat by Dublin.

By 1925 King had established himself on the team, as Galway beat Kilkenny by 9-4 to 6-0 in the All-Ireland semi-final to set up a championship decider with Tipperary. It was Galway's third All-Ireland final in-a-row, however, Tipperary scored two quick goals. King's side never recovered and lost the game by 5-6 to 1-5.

The next two seasons saw Galway face defeat in the All-Ireland semi-final; however, the team received special treatment in 1928. That year Galway got a bye into the All-Ireland final without even picking up a hurley. Cork were the opponents on that occasion and beat King's side by 6-12 to 1-0.

King was off the team again in 1929 as Galway lost out to Cork in a second consecutive championship decider. This was Galway's last appearance in the All-Ireland final until 1953, however, there was one final victory left in the team in the 1930-1931 National Hurling League. In the final of that competition Galway played Tipperary, the reigning All-Ireland champions. Galway won the game by 4-5 to 4-4. It was King's sole National League title and his only major honour from inter-county activity.

After suffering a number of consecutive defeats in the All-Ireland semi-final, King retired from inter-county hurling in 1935.

King was posthumously named on the Galway Hurling Team of the Millennium in 2000. His inclusion on the team in the right wing-forward position marks him out as one of his county’s greatest-ever players.
