= Atlanta City Hall =

Seat of City of Atlanta's government

- U.S. National Register of Historic Places
- Atlanta Landmark Building
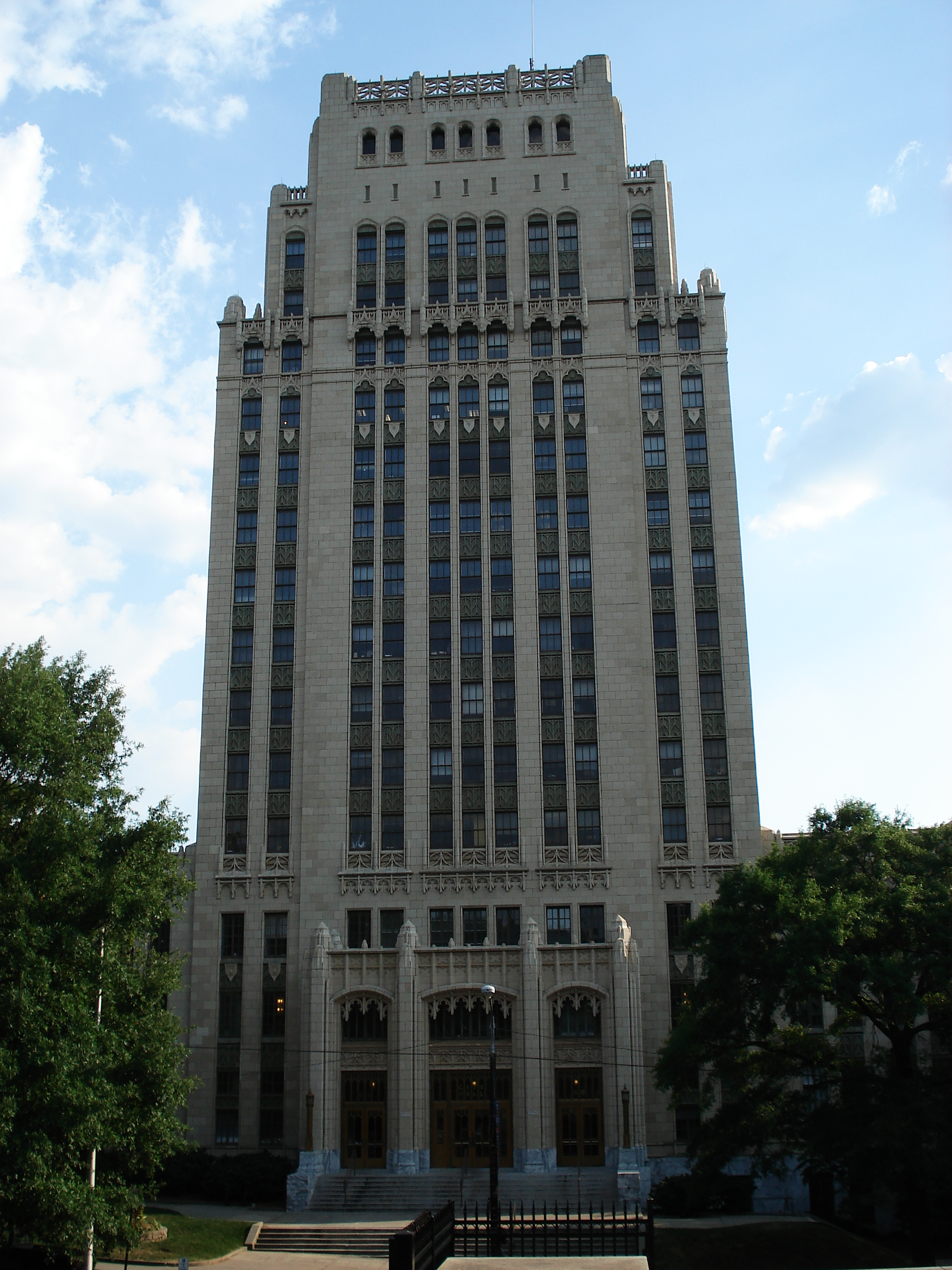

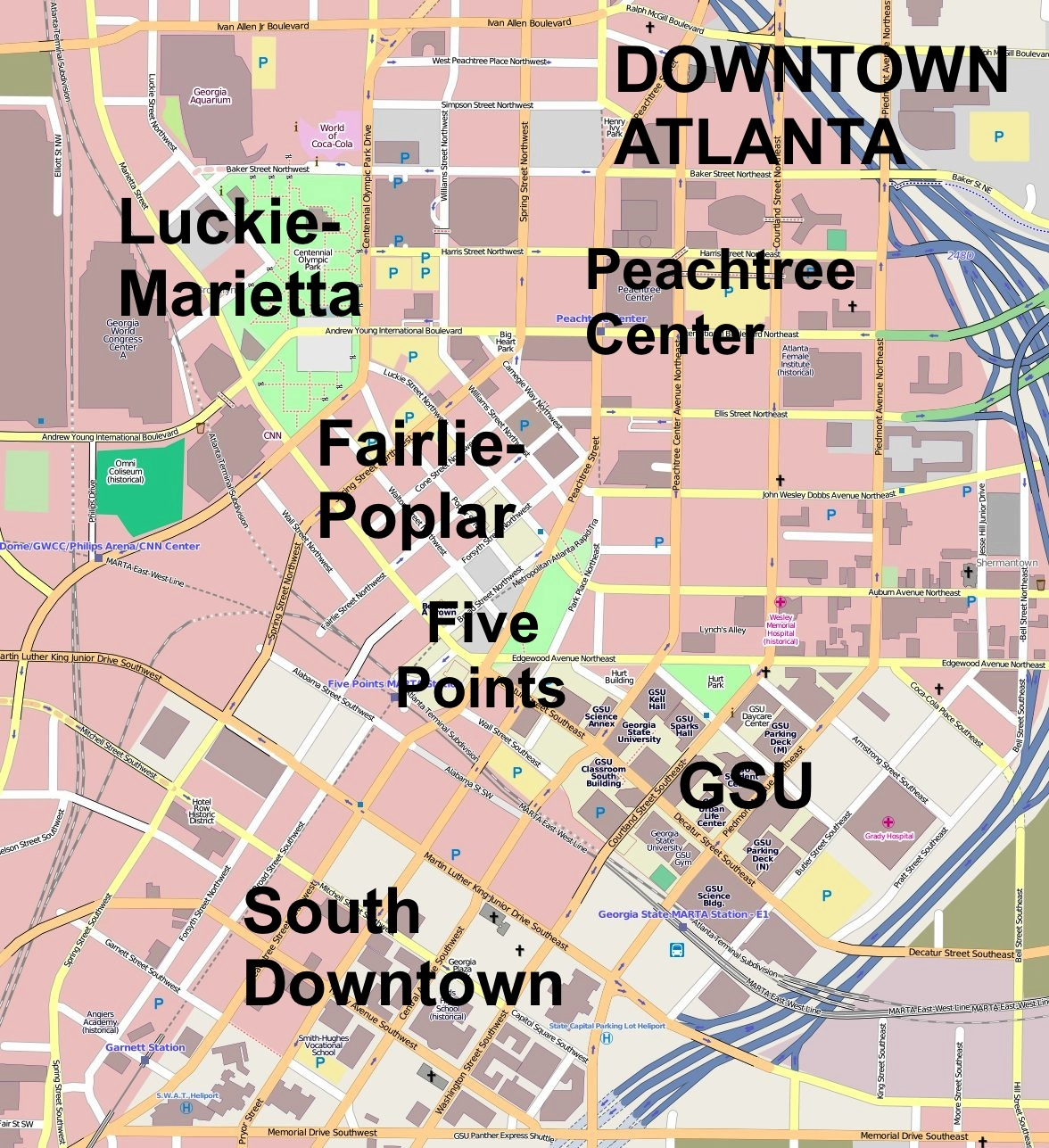
- Location within Downtown Atlanta Location within Atlanta Location within Georgia Location within the United States
- Location: 68 Mitchell Street NE, Atlanta, Georgia, United States
- Coordinates: 33°44′56″N 84°23′25″W
- Built: 1930; 96 years ago
- Architects: Preacher, Lloyd G.; National Construction Co.
- Architectural style: Late Gothic Revival
- NRHP reference No.: 83000227

Significant dates
- Added to NRHP: July 13, 1983
- Designated ALB: October 23, 1989

Atlanta City Hall is the headquarters of the City of Atlanta government. It was constructed in 1930, and is located in Downtown Atlanta. It is a high-rise office tower very similar to dozens of other city halls built in the United States during the same time period. Located in South Downtown, it is near other governmental structures, such as the Georgia State Capitol and the Fulton County Courthouse. The Neo-Gothic structure features many architectural details that have helped to make the building a historical landmark. It is Atlanta’s fourth city hall.

== History ==
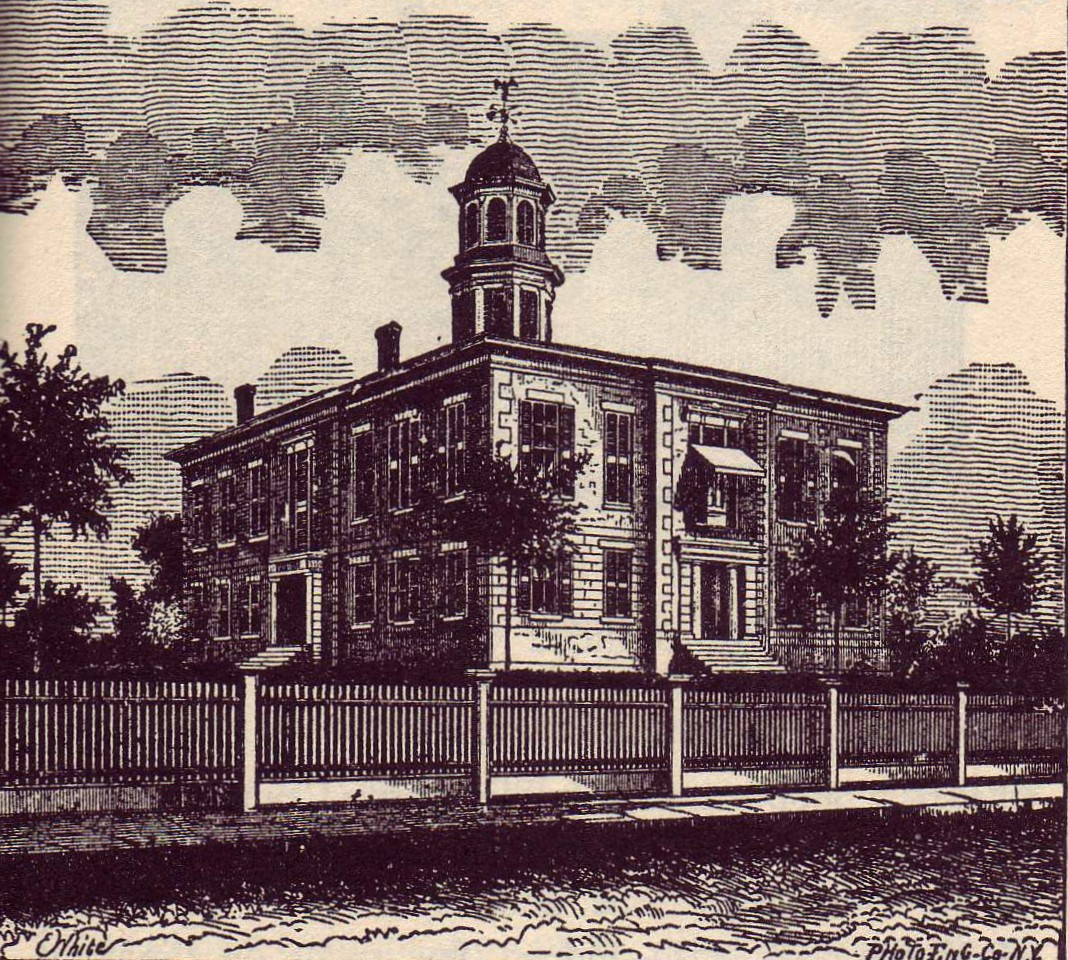
Atlanta’s first official city hall

=== Early city hall buildings ===
After half a decade of makeshift meeting places for city business (including hotels and grocery stores), in 1853 mayor of Atlanta John Mims purchased the four-acre (16,000 m^{2}) “Peters’s Reserve” from Richard Peters for $5,000. On this land (current site of the Georgia State Capitol) was built a two-story brick structure (with an additional two-story cupola) for the city hall as well as some court functions. Each floor was 70 by 100-foot (30 m) providing nearly 15,000-square-foot (1,400 m^{2}) of space. It opened on October 17, 1854, and served for three decades during which time it served as campgrounds for the occupying Union army during the war and was briefly the state capitol during 1868 when the capital first moved from Milledgeville, Georgia. It was demolished in 1885. In 1882, Atlanta City Hall was relocated to the old chamber of commerce building, which was four stories tall and located on the northeast corner of Pryor and Hunter, across Hunter (now Martin Luther King Jr. Drive) from the site of the Fulton County Courthouse. It was the city hall from 1882 to 1911, leaving the same year that the Courthouse started construction.

=== 1911–1930 City Hall building ===
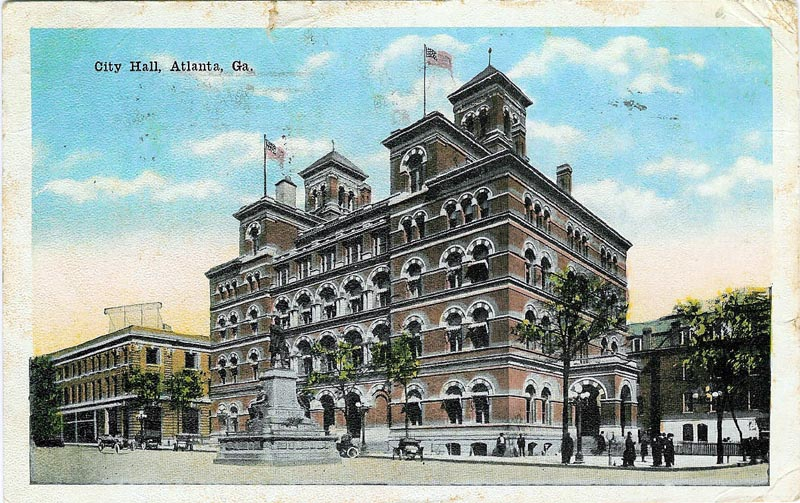
City Hall 1911–1930

In 1911, the city hall moved to what once the U.S. Post Office and Customs House, located on the north side of Marietta Street between Forsyth and Fairlie. Purchased from the U.S. federal government by Atlanta mayor Robert Maddox for $70,000 (equivalent to $2.4 million in 2025), this imposing structure served as city hall for nearly twenty years. It was so solidly built that the first company hired to raze it actually went out of business before completing the job.

=== Current building ===
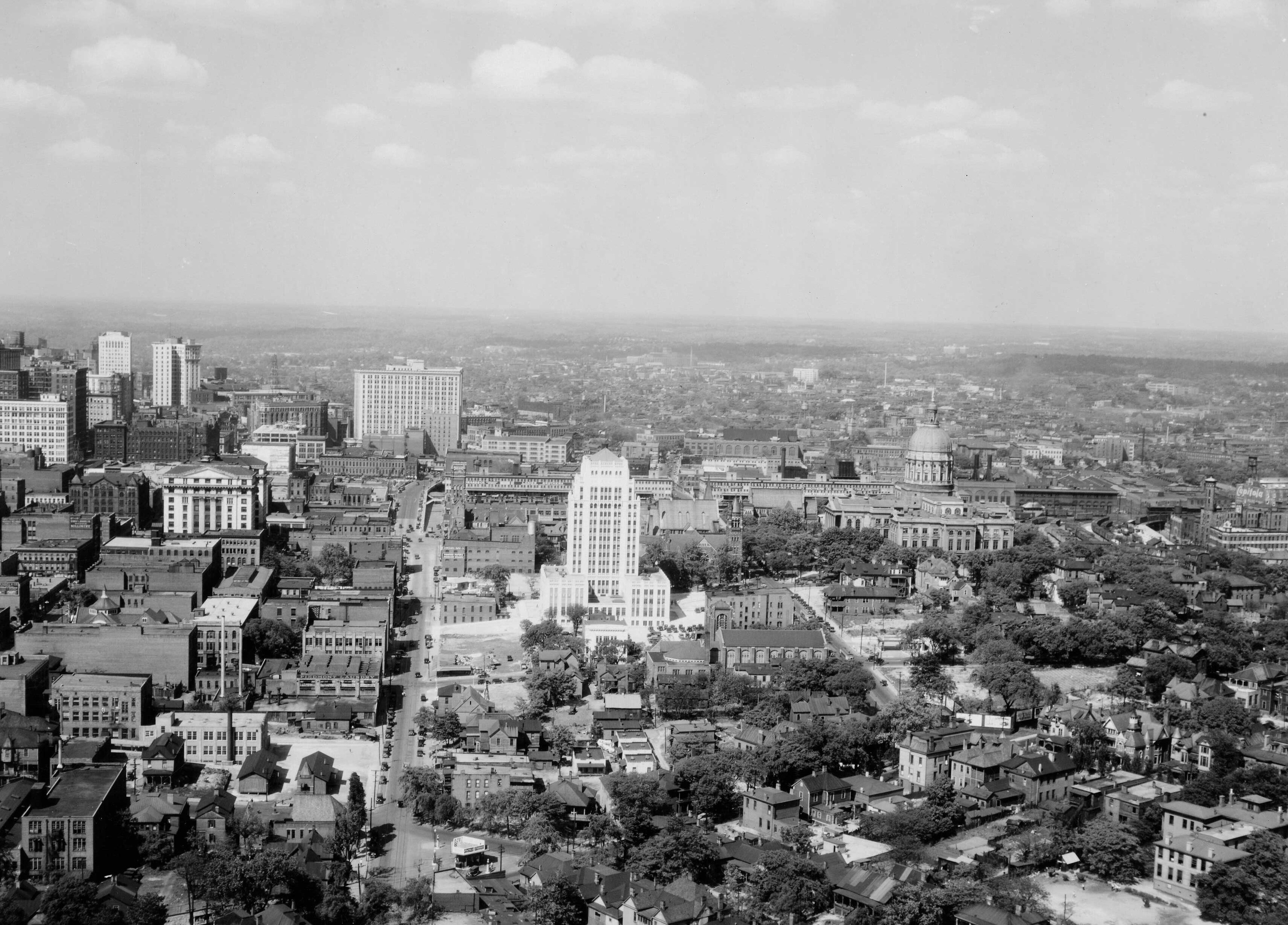
New City Hall, 1931

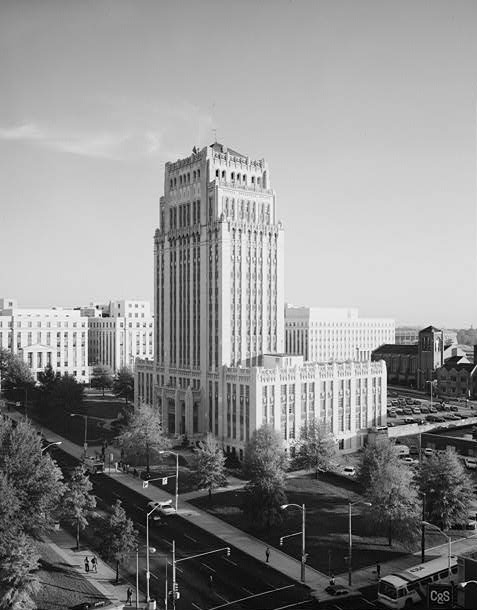
In 1981

The current city hall, designed by G. Lloyd Preacher, was completed in February 1930. Located in South Downtown at 68 Mitchell Street SW, the building occupies the site of the house that General William Tecumseh Sherman took as the headquarters of his occupation after his Atlanta campaign and before his March to the Sea (Sept.–Nov., 1864). The house was one of the few buildings in Atlanta that Sherman did not destroy. At the time, it belonged to Richard F. Lyon, an associate justice of the Supreme Court of Georgia. This building is listed on the National Register of Historic Places. An annex was completed in 1989, and the building was designated a “landmark building exterior” on October 23 of that year.

On the fifth floor of the building, there is a 3,000 square foot area called the Green Roof. It was completed in 2003, and contains a garden with 2,800 plants from 31 species.

=== City Hall East ===
Between 1990 and 2010 some city hall services had been available at City Hall East, located on Ponce de Leon Avenue in the Old Fourth Ward neighborhood, northeast of downtown. The building formerly belonged to Sears. The city of Atlanta sold the building in June 2011 to Jamestown, a developer, which agreed to pay $27 million for the property. It was renamed Ponce City Market.

== Photo gallery ==
Atlanta City Hall seen behind The Catholic Shrine of the Immaculate Conception, which was built in 1873

Atlanta City Hall overlooking trees

Front facade of building

Front door detail

Gothic Revival top

Street level ornamentation

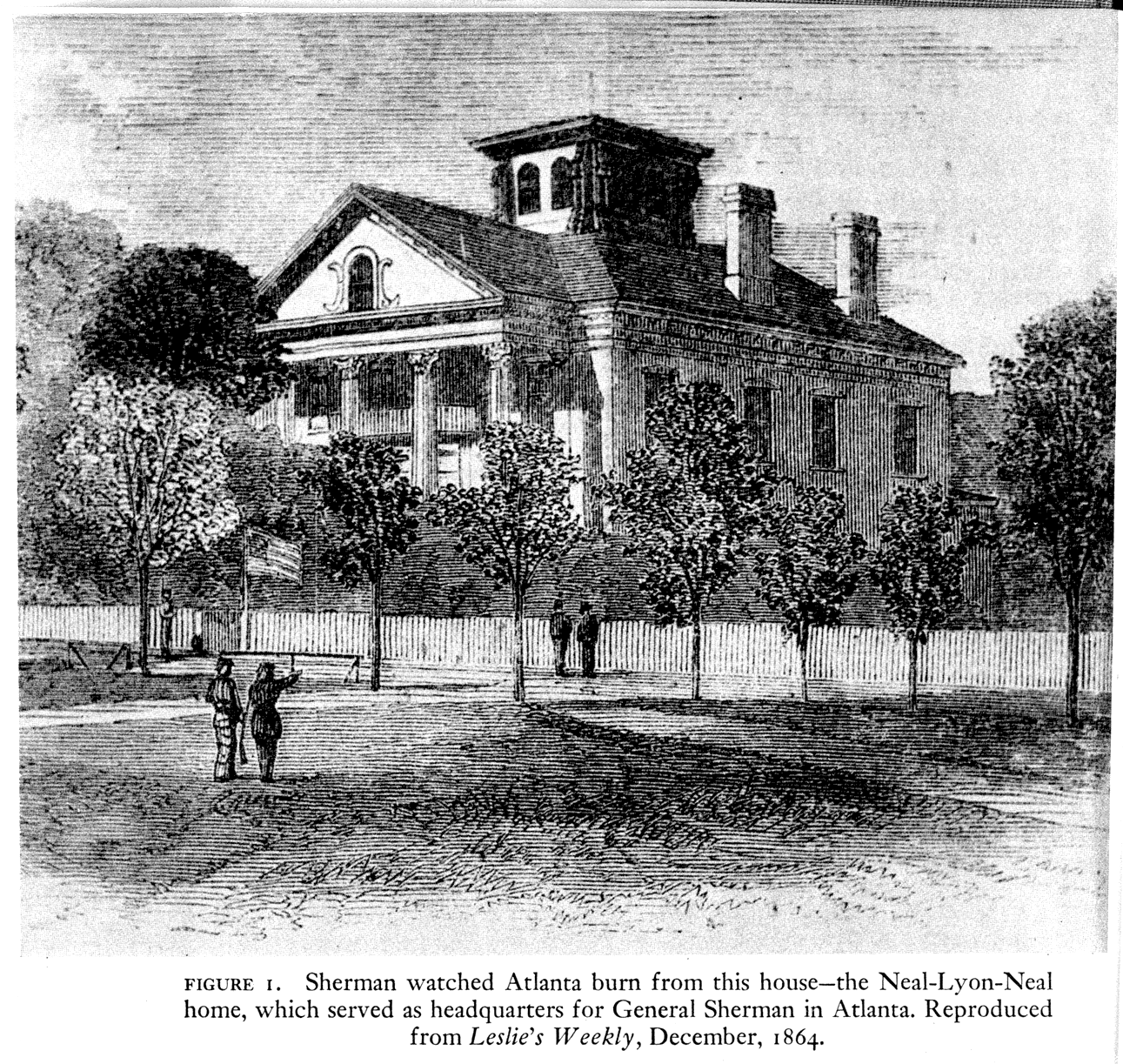
The Neal Home previously on the current City Hall site
