= Music of Atlanta =

Atlanta has a thriving music industry and is considered to be a capital of hip-hop including crunk, of R&B and its offshoot neo-soul, and of gospel music - in addition to a thriving indie-rock and live music scene. Classical, country and blues have historically been well represented. From the 1920s through 1950s the city was a major center for country music.

== Modern hip-hop, R&B, neo soul ==
In 2009, the New York Times called Atlanta "hip-hop's center of gravity", and the city is home to many popular hip-hop, R&B and neo soul musicians.

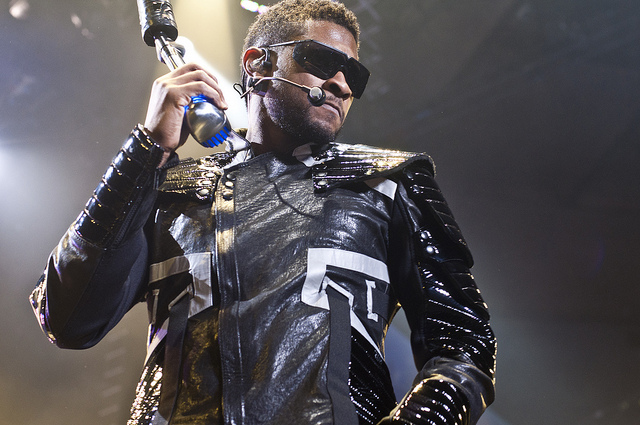
Usher

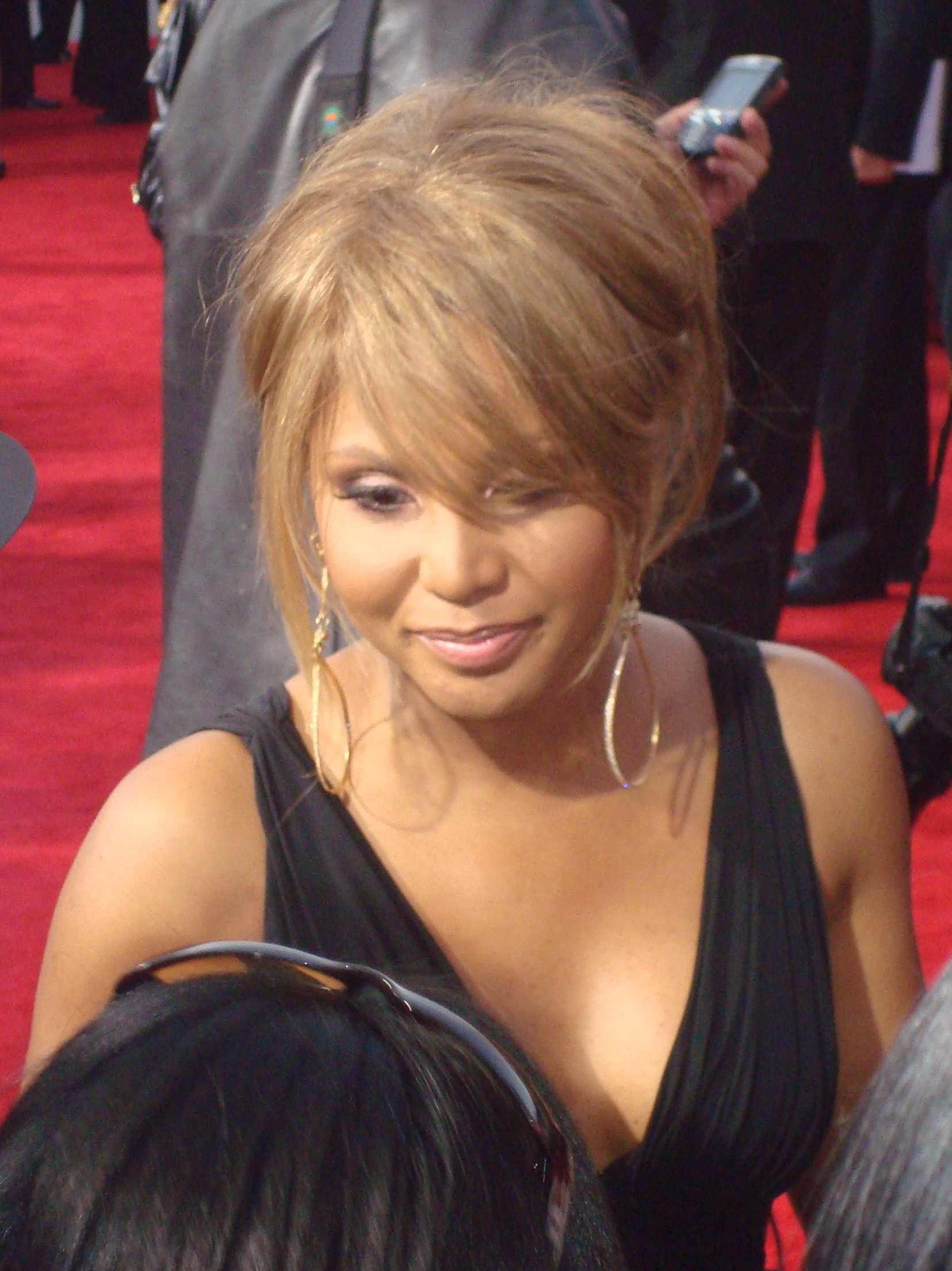
Toni Braxton

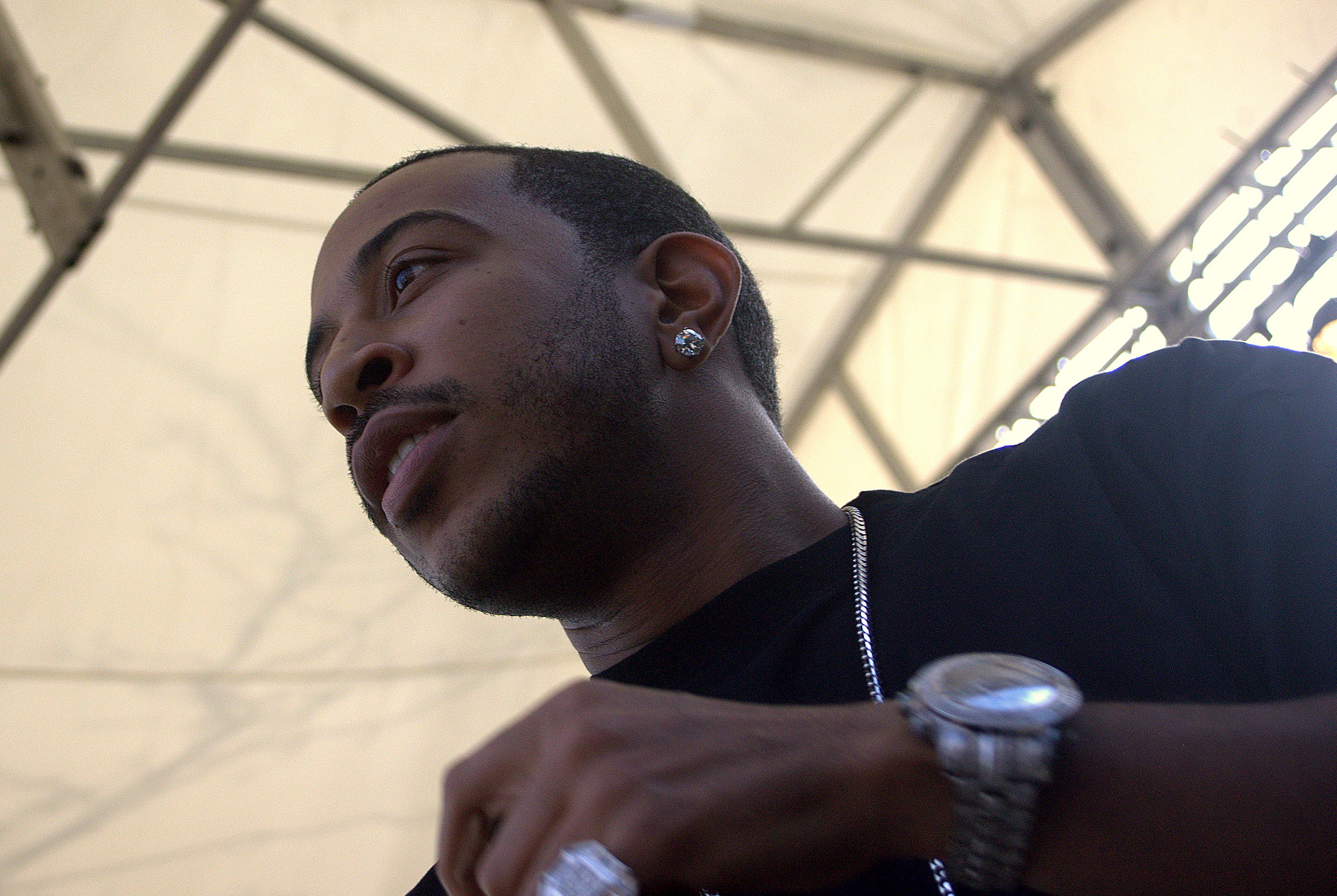
Ludacris

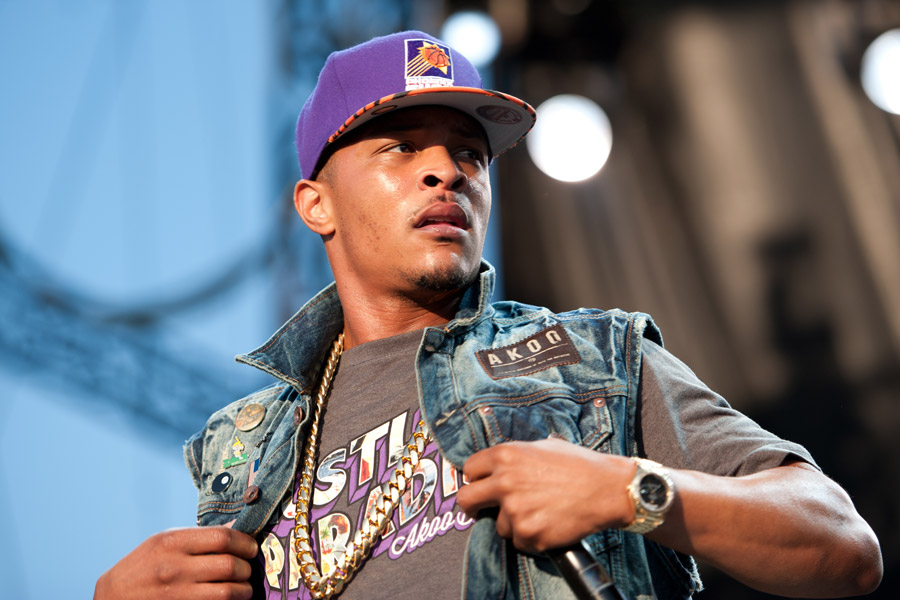
T.I.

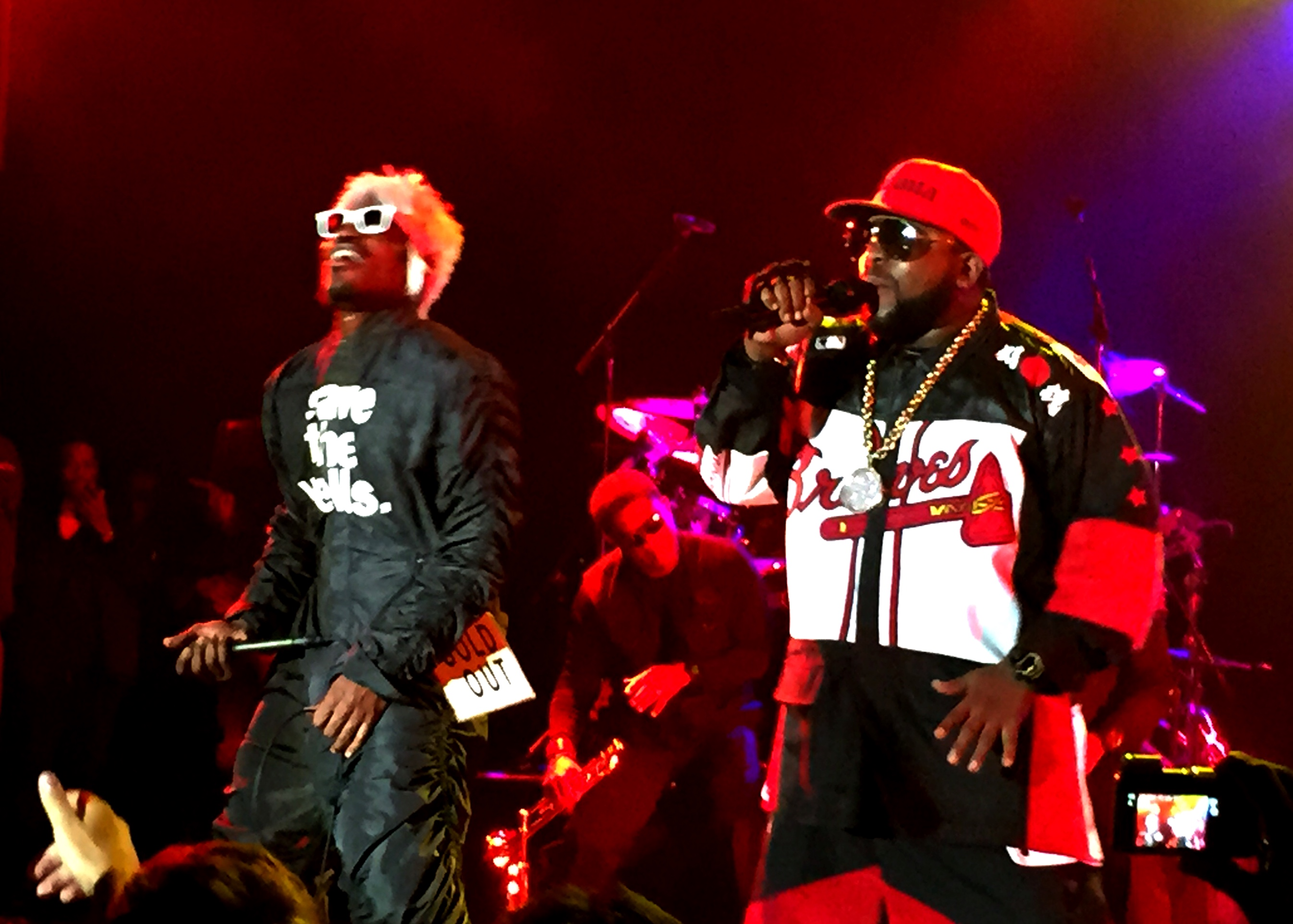
OutKast

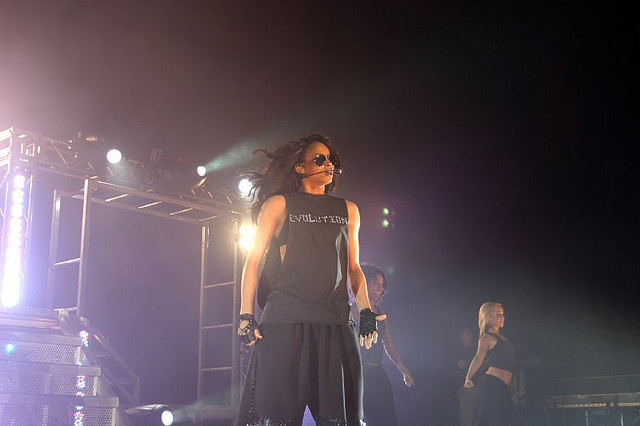
Ciara

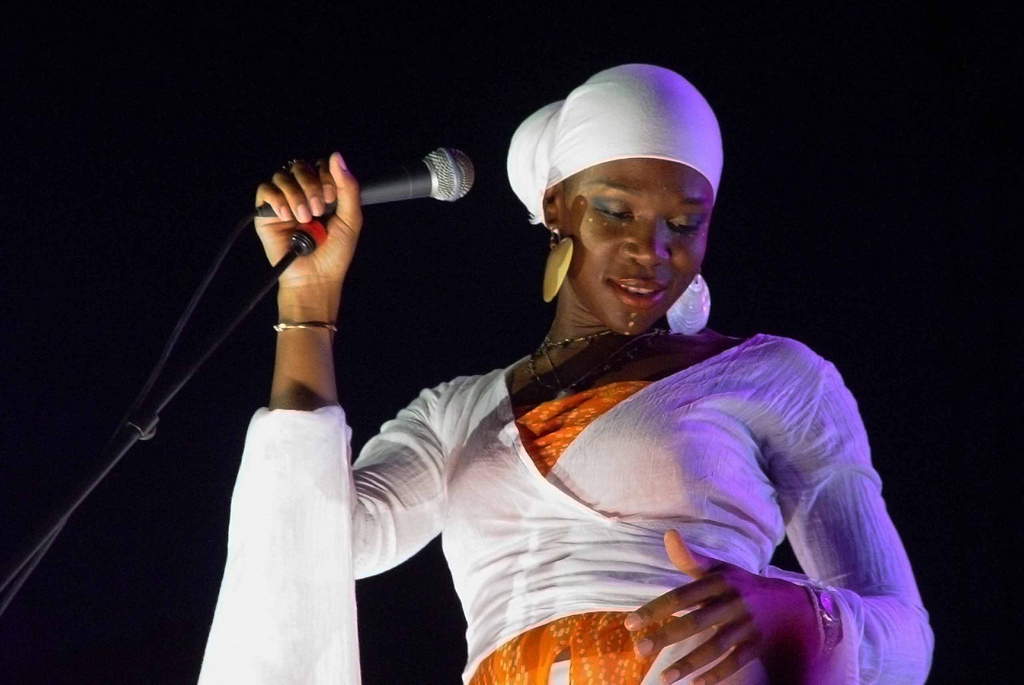
India.Arie

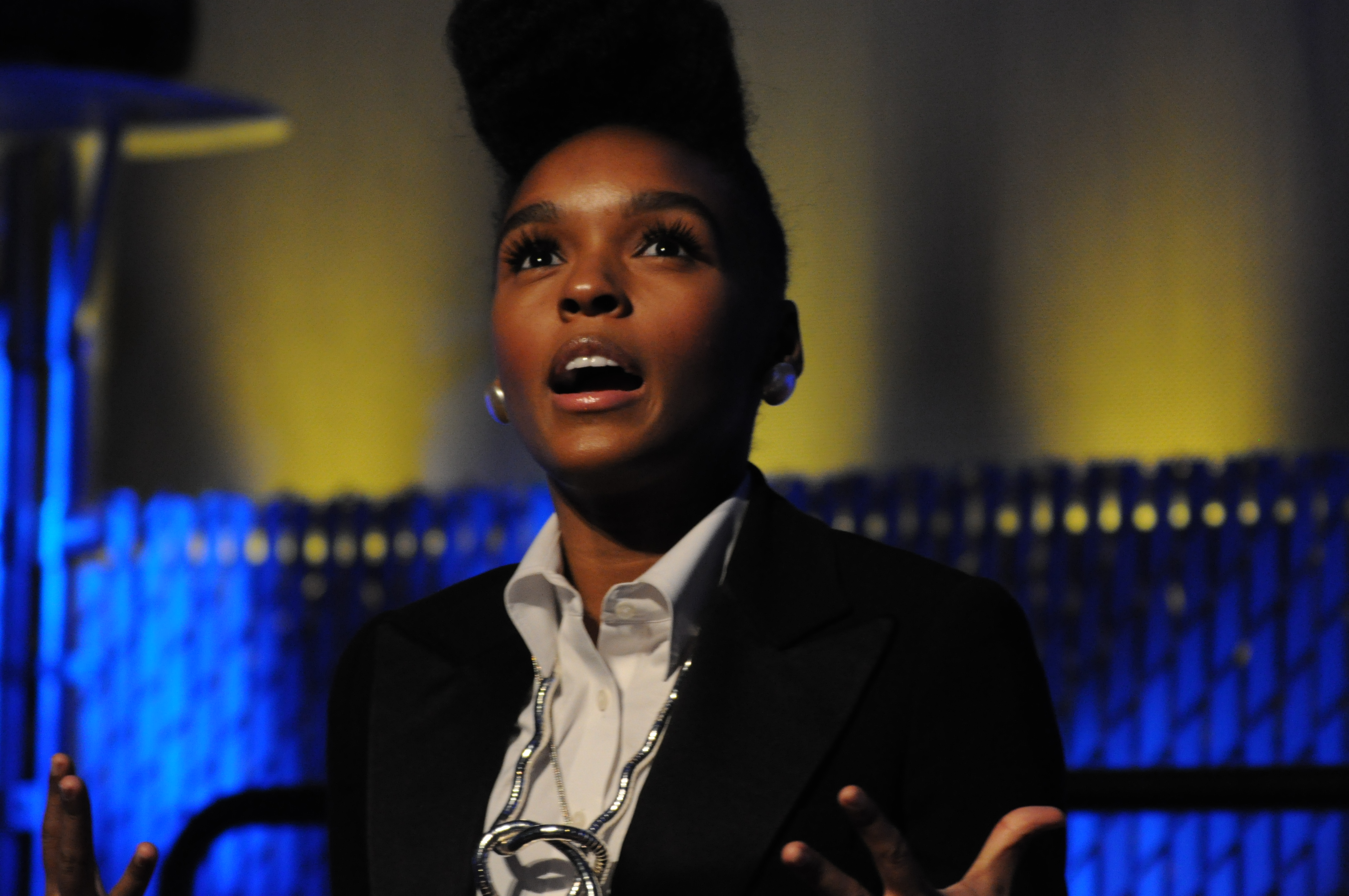
Janelle Monáe

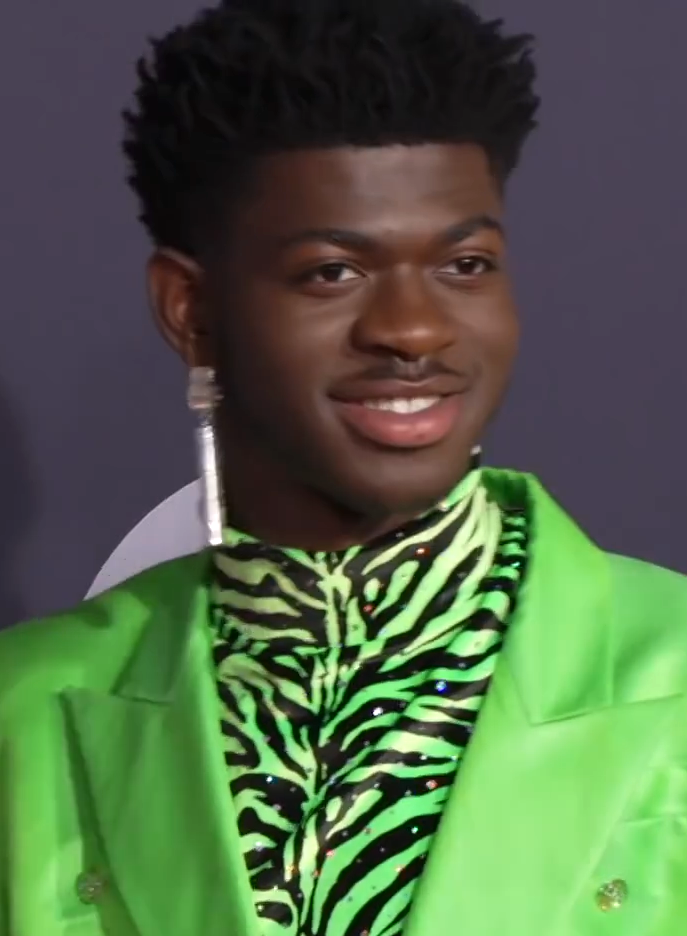
Lil Nas X

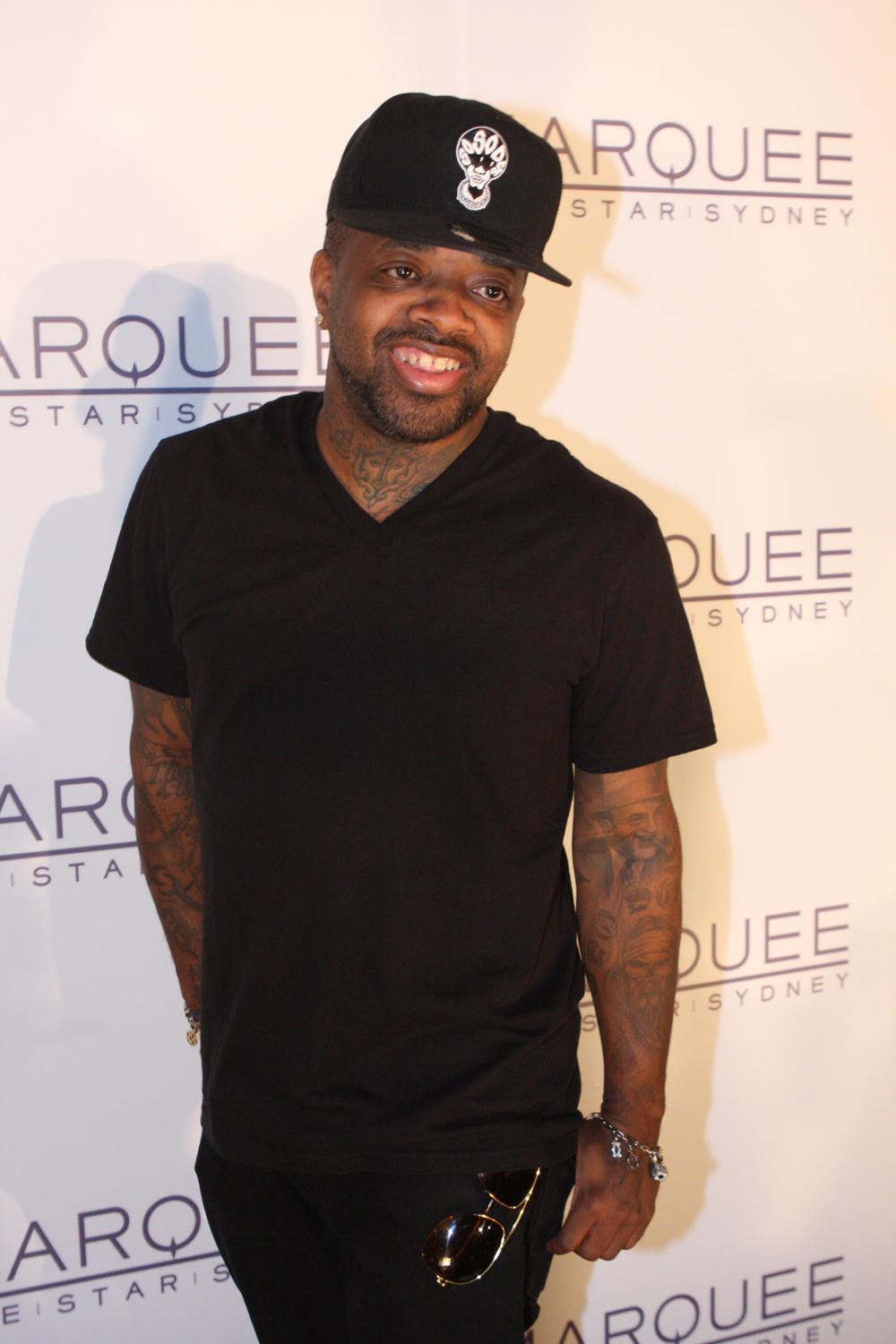
Jermaine Dupri

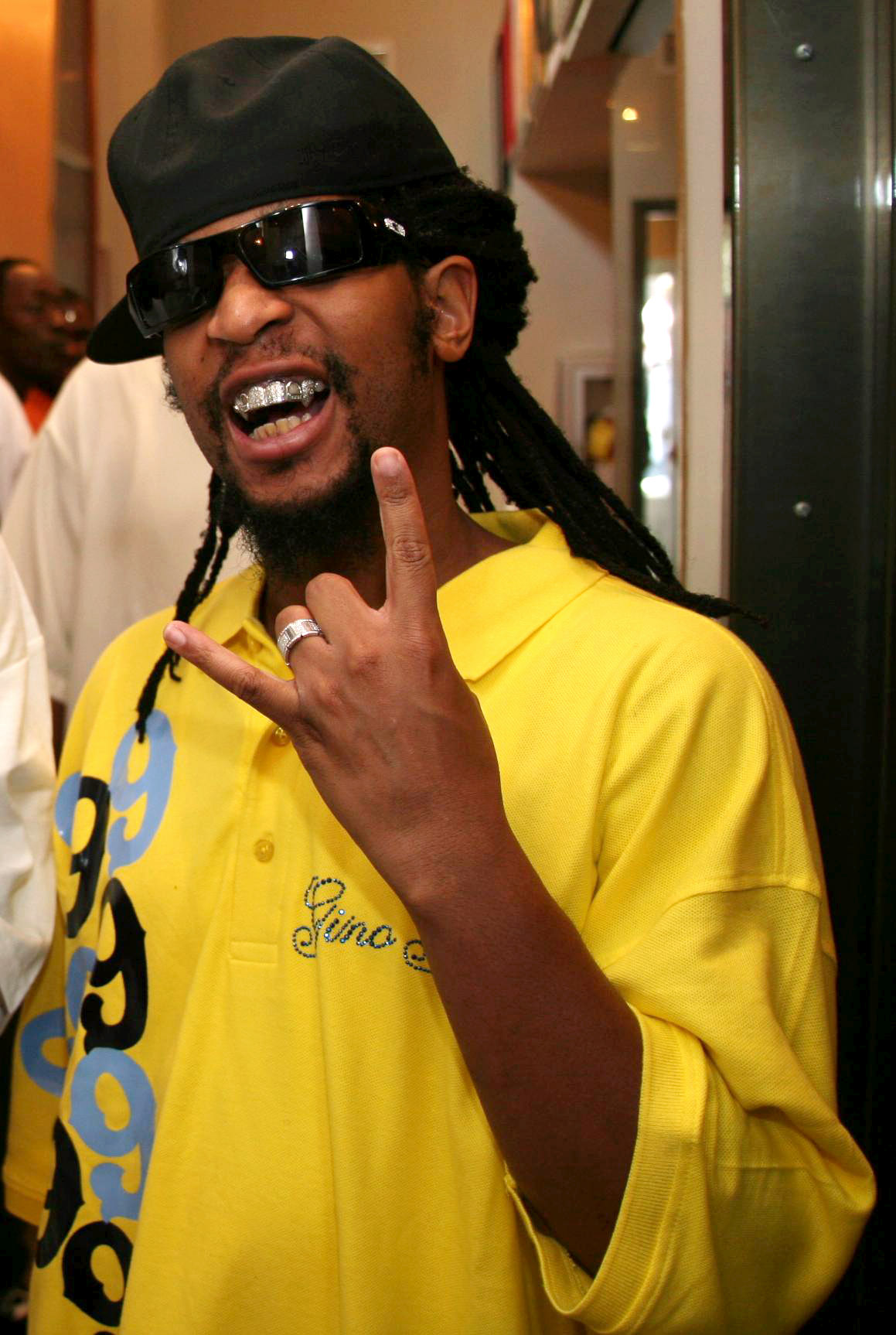
Lil Jon

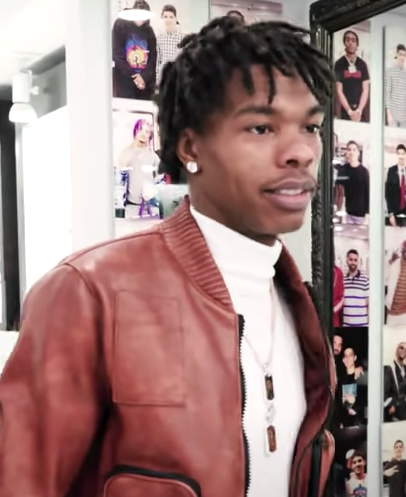
Lil Baby

The following hip-hop, rap, R&B and soul artists have had #1 or #2 singles on the U.S. Hot 100 chart:

Artist	Year	Rank	Single name	Year	Rank	Album name
B.o.B	2010	1	Nothin' on You	2010	1	B.o.B Presents: The Adventures of Bobby Ray
Lil Nas X	2018-2021	1	3#1 singles	2021	2	Montero
CeeLo Green	2010	2	Fuck You!			The Lady Killer
Childish Gambino	2018	1	This Is America			
Ciara	2004	1	Goodies	2006	1	Ciara: The Evolution
D4L	2006	1	Laffy Taffy			Down for Life
Kris Kross	1992-1995	1	Jump	1992	1	Totally Krossed Out
Lil Jon	2003	2	Get Low			Kings of Crunk
Lloyd			You	2007	2	Street Love
Ludacris	2003-2006	1	5#1 singles	2003-2010	1	4#1 albums
Migos	2017	1	Bad and Boujee	2017	1	Culture (Migos album)
Monica	1998-1999	1	3#1 singles	2003	1	2#1 albums
T.I.	2008	1	4#1 singles	2006-2008	1	3#1 albums
TLC	1992-1999	1	4#1 singles	1999	1	FanMail
Outkast	2000-2003	1	3#1 singles	2003	1	Speakerboxxx/The Love Below
Shop Boyz	2007	2	Party Like a Rockstar			Rockstar Mentality
The-Dream			Rockin' That Shit	2009	2	Love vs. Money
Toni Braxton	1996-2000	1	2#1 singles	1993	1	Toni Braxton
Usher	1998-2010		9#1 singles	2004-2010		4#1 albums
Young Jeezy	2008		Put On	2006	1	3#1 albums

Some other local artists include(d):

- The Anointed Pace Sisters
- 1017 Brick Squad
- 112 (band)
- 6LACK
- 2 Chainz
- 21 Savage
- Alfamega
- Andre 3000
- Arrested Development
- ATL
- B5
- Baby D
- Big Boi
- Big Gipp
- Big Kuntry King
- Big Rube
- Blaque
- Bobby Creekwater
- Bobby V
- Bone Crusher
- Bow Wow
- Boyz n da Hood
- Bubba Sparxxx
- B.o.B
- Cash Out
- Che
- Cherish
- Chloe x Halle
- Christopher Massey
- CLAVVS
- Crime Mob
- Cyhi the Prynce
- D4L
- Da Brat
- Deante' Hitchcock
- Dem Franchize Boyz
- Diamond
- Dondria
- DJ Toomp
- Dolla
- Drumma Boy
- Dungeon Family
- EarthGang
- Fabo
- Freak Nasty
- Future
- Goodie Mob
- Gorilla Zoe
- Gucci Mane
- Gunna
- I-20
- iLoveMakonnen
- India Arie
- Jacquees
- Jagged Edge
- Jarren Benton
- Jazze Pha
- Jermaine Dupri
- JID
- Johntá Austin
- K. Michelle
- Kandi Burruss
- Kap G
- Keith Sweat
- Keke Wyatt
- Keri Hilson
- Khia
- Khujo
- Killer Mike
- Kilo Ali
- Kyle Massey
- Latto
- Lecrae
- Lil Baby
- Lil Gotit
- Lil Keed
- Lil Nas X
- Lil Ru
- Lil Scrappy
- Lil Zane
- Lil Yachty
- Lisa Lopes
- London on da Track
- Lyfe Jennings
- Lucky Daye
- Lumberjacks (group)
- Migos
- Monifah
- Mike Will Made It
- Mullage
- Musiq Soulchild
- Natalie Lauren Sims
- Nivea
- Nitti
- O'so Krispie
- OJ da Juiceman
- Outkast
- P$C
- Pastor Troy
- Pill
- Playaz Circle
- Playboi Carti
- Polow da Don
- Princess
- Rasheeda
- Rich Homie Quan
- Rich the Kid
- Rocko (rapper)
- Roscoe Dash
- Rubi Rose
- Sammie
- Sean Garrett
- Silentó
- Shawty Lo
- Shop Boyz
- Silk (group)
- Slick Pulla
- Soulja Boy
- Speech
- Spillage Village
- Stat Quo
- Syleena Johnson
- Summer Walker
- Supreeme
- Taurus
- The Mr. Move
- TLC
- Travis Porter
- Trillville
- Tyra B
- Tyrese
- Unk
- USDA
- V.I.C.
- Xscape
- Ying Yang Twins
- Young Dro
- YoungBloodZ
- Young Thug
- Y.C.
- Yung Joc
- Yung L.A.
- Yung Wun
- Waka Flocka Flame

In the 1980s and early 1990s Atlanta's hip hop scene was characterized by a local variant of Miami's electro-driven bass music, with stars like Kilo Ali, MC Shy-D, Raheem the Dream, and DJ Smurf (later Mr. Collipark). MC Shy-D is credited with bringing authentic Bronx-style hip-hop to Atlanta (and Miami), such as 1988's Shake it produced by DJ Toomp.

The Dungeon Family is a hip hop/R&B/soul musical collective, based in Atlanta and specializing in Southern hip hop with heavy funk and soul influences. Members include OutKast, Goodie Mob, P.A., Lumberjacks, Society of Soul, André 3000, Big Boi, Backbone, Mr. DJ, Big Gipp, Cee Lo Green, Khujo, T-Mo, Witchdoctor, Big Rube, Cool Breeze, Big Reese, Killer Mike, Bubba Sparxxx, BlackOwned C-Bone and Supa Nate. The Dungeon Family also includes Rico Wade, Ray Murray, and Sleepy Brown who constitute the production/songwriting team Organized Noize, who have produced hits for the main popular Dungeon Family groups OutKast and Goodie Mob. By the mid-1990s, the rise of OutKast, Goodie Mob and Organized Noize led to the development of the Dirty South style of hip-hop and of Atlanta gaining a reputation for "soul-minded hip-hop eccentrics", contrasting with other regional styles.

The Yin Yang Café (now Apache Café) in Midtown on 3rd Street was a centerpoint for the development of the neo-soul scene including artist such as India.Arie, Society of Soul, Laurnéa, Kemetic Just, Sleepy Brown, Divinity Roxx, Naked Jazz, Khari Simmons, and Anthony David.

From the late 1990s to early 2000s, producer Lil Jon was a driving force behind the party-oriented style known as crunk. Record producers L.A. Reid and Babyface founded LaFace Records in Atlanta in the late-1980s; the label eventually became the home to multi-platinum selling artists such as Toni Braxton, TLC and Ciara. It is also the home of So So Def Records, a label founded by Jermaine Dupri in the mid-1990s, that signed acts such as Da Brat, Jagged Edge, Xscape and Dem Franchise Boyz. The success of LaFace and SoSo Def led to Atlanta as an established scene for record labels such as LaFace parent company Arista Records to set up satellite offices.

In 2009 the New York Times noted that after 2000, Atlanta moved "from the margins to becoming hip-hop's center of gravity, part of a larger shift in hip-hop innovation to the South." Producer Drumma Boy called Atlanta "the melting pot of the South". Producer Fatboi called the Roland TR-808 ("808") synthesizer "central" to the music of Atlanta's versatility, used for snap, crunk, trap, and pop rap styles. The same article named Drumma Boy, Fatboi, Shawty Redd and Zaytoven the four "hottest producers driving the city".

== Magic City ==
Magic City is Atlanta's premiere gentlemen's club, responsible for launching artists such as Future, Young Thug, and Gucci Mane into the mainstream. Magic, the owner of Magic City, takes pride in his love of stripping and believes that the rap game in Atlanta is held together by "the power of booty." However, the role of strippers isn't just a position of subservience for the aesthetics of the club. Because they control the mood of the room, they have the ability to control audiences; they can make or break rap artists. The dancers request songs, so if they're getting 10,000 thrown at them whenever it blasts, they will continue to request the song. A club goer explained, "The girls pick what record pops in the streets. They pick what rapper pops in the streets. The girls at Magic City are the streets."

== Gospel ==
Atlanta plays a major role in the gospel music scene in many genres, particularly urban contemporary gospel (black gospel) as well as Southern gospel. The leading industry award ceremony, the GMA Dove Awards of the Gospel Music Association, have taken place since 2011 in Atlanta's Fox Theater. The Atlanta Gospel Choice Awards are also given out yearly at a well-attended festival. Gospel groups based in Atlanta included The Statesmen Quartet and many others.

== Pop, rock, and metal ==
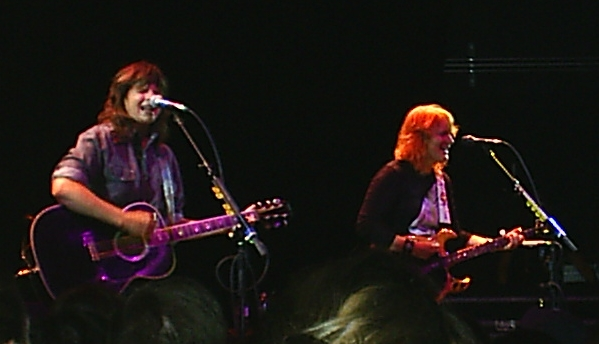
Indigo Girls

Atlanta has also produced rock and pop music singers, such as the folk-pop Indigo Girls, The Black Crowes, Shawn Mullins, The Changelings, alternative metal band Sevendust, ska/punk band Treephort, comedy-core pioneers Attractive Eighties Women, Maserati, post-rock band Light Pupil Dilate, dream-pop band Seely, rock bands Uncle Green (a.k.a. 3 Lb. Thrill), Injected, doubleDrive, City Sleeps, Manchester Orchestra, Collective Soul and Third Day, Butch Walker, and was a proving ground for Connecticut-born pop-rock-blues musician John Mayer. Mayer, as well as India.Arie and Shawn Mullins, all performed pre-fame at Eddie's Attic, an independent club in the intown suburb of Decatur. The "Open Mic Shootout" at Eddie's Attic consistently draws singer-songwriter talent from across the nation, and is held every Monday night.

The Satellites played every Monday night for $1. at Hedgen's in Buckhead, and Pranks played various bars. They all hit the big time.

During the 1980s, Atlanta had an active Punk rock scene that was centered on two of the city's music venues, 688 Club and the Metroplex, and Atlanta famously played host to the Sex Pistols first U.S. show, which was performed at the Great Southeastern Music Hall. Subculture continued to flourish in the 1990s with the Masquerade and Tyranny which featured industrial and dark wave. The Chamber, formed based on the success of Club Fetish, an industrial and gothic night hosted by the Masquerade, became a cultural icon. Little Five Points also continued to be the center of counter culture.

There is also a large metal scene in the Atlanta, including sludge metal band Mastodon, metalcore band Woe, Is Me, Issues, and deathcore band Attila. Other sludge metal groups from Savannah, Georgia are also sometimes associated with the Atlanta scene, including Baroness, Kylesa, Royal Thunder, and Black Tusk.

Justin Bieber lived in Atlanta during the early to mid-2010s when he was heavily recording music, having been drawn there by Usher and signed to the RBMG label.

Atlanta has also had a thriving indie rock scene since the early 1980s. Notable bands and artists over the years have included Drivin N Cryin, Magnapop, The Now Explosion, Mr. Crowes Garden, Dirt, The Opal Foxx Quartet, The Jody Grind, Cartel, Norma Jean, Smoke, Black Lips, Flap, The Subsonics, The Rockerz, Toenut, The Rock*A*Teens, Pineal Ventana, Ultrababyfat, nerdkween, Atlas Sound, Almighty Defenders, The Gaye Blades, Made in China, The Tom Collins, dropsonic, The Dreaded Marco, The Orphins, Bobby Ubangi, The Coathangers, Brass Castle, The Liverhearts, Elevado, Jackyl, Deerhunter, Family Force 5, Whores, The Selmanaires, Kaki King, Woe, Is Me, Starbenders, John-Allison Weiss, and Mallbangs. Other groups prominent in Atlanta included Guadalcanal Diary, The Swimming Pool Q's, Loudflower, Incarceri 9, and Arms Akimbo.

Notable industrial groups based out of Atlanta include Combichrist, Die Sektor, and Finite Automata.

The city also boasts a large, diverse Synthwave and modular synth community featuring groups such as Gregorio Franco, Watch Out For Snakes, and Vampire Step-dad.

Electronic jam-groove band Sound Tribe Sector 9 is also from Atlanta.

In the early 1980s, Atlanta was the home of a thriving pop and new wave music scene featuring such bands as The Fans, The Brains, The Producers, The Raves, Baby and the Pacifiers, The Razor Boys, The Neuz, Desperate Angel, Samurai Catfish, Heathen Girls and Face of Concern. Atlanta is also the home of Grammy Award-winning artist and songwriter Van Hunt.

Atlanta also boasts a thriving metal scene with bands such as Sevendust, Stuck Mojo, Mastodon, and HellBent.

== Live music ==
The city has a well-known and active live music scene. In the early 1980s, Atlanta was the home of a thriving new wave music scene featuring such bands as The Brains and The Producers, closely linked to the new wave scenes in Athens, Georgia and other college towns in the southeast. Historically there have been a variety of live music traditions going back to Cabbagetown country music pioneer Fiddlin' John Carson, also including a thriving scene in the 1990s, also in Cabbagetown, centered on a bar called Dotties, later known as Lenny's and relocated a few blocks away before closing permanently in 2010. Video Concert Hall, precursor to MTV, was founded in Atlanta.

The 688 Club was a popular alternative music venue from 1980–1986. The Masquerade is a popular concert venue.

== Blues and jazz ==
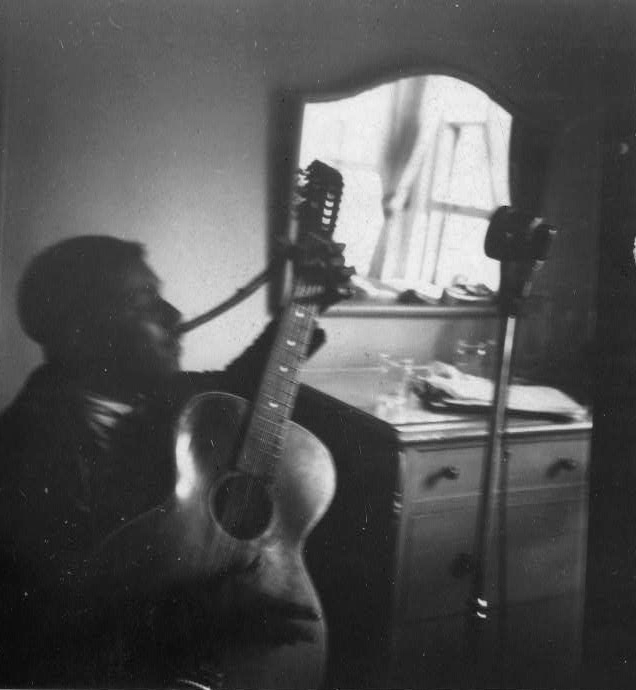
Blind Willie McTell, Piedmont blues

Though not a blues capital like Memphis or New Orleans, Atlanta has been home to a blues scene and a number of notable bluesmen including Buddy Moss, Curley Weaver, Barbecue Bob and Blind Willie McTell. In the blues bar named after McTell, Blind Willie's, and several others, blues musicians such as Francine Reed, Delta Moon, and Sandra Hall have performed. There are also a number of jazz clubs and the annual Atlanta Jazz Festival. On the 30th anniversary of the festival, mayor Shirley Franklin commissioned the portrait Jazz of the City of Atlanta, displayed in City Hall.

== Country ==
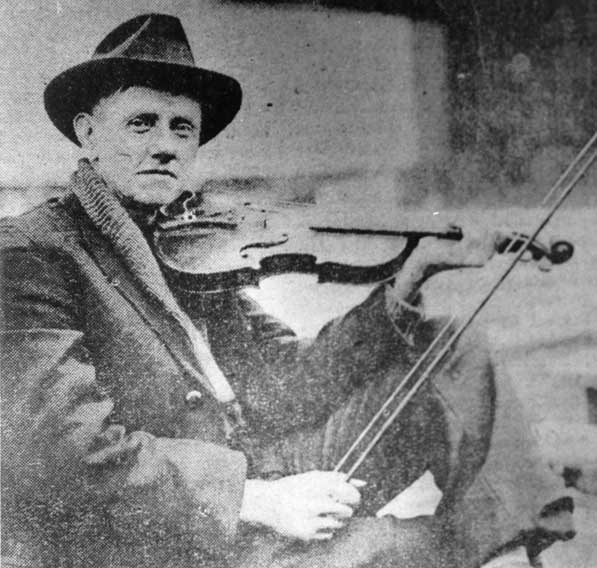
Fiddlin' John Carson, a star of Atlanta country music, which thrived in the 1920s-1950s

Atlanta played a major role in launching country's earliest recording artists in the early 1920s — many Appalachian people such as Fiddlin' John Carson had come to the city to work in its cotton mills and brought their music with them. It would remain a major recording center for two decades and a major performance center for four decades, into the first country music TV shows on local Atlanta stations in the 1950s. Today, Metro Atlanta is home to Alan Jackson, Jason Aldean, Zac Brown Band, Sugarland, Kenny Rogers, Jerry Reed, Ray Stevens and Travis Tritt.

== Classical music and opera ==
Metro Atlanta is home to: the Grammy Award-winning Atlanta Symphony Orchestra and Chorus; two renowned historical chamber groups, the Atlanta Baroque Orchestra and the New Trinity Baroque; and to notable musicians such as conductors Robert Spano and Predrag Gosta, the late Robert Shaw, countertenor David Daniels, bass Jason Hardy, and others. Atlanta is also home to the Atlanta Opera, Atlanta Ballet, Capitol City Opera, Georgia Boy Choir, Atlanta Boy Choir, and many others.

The music salon of the Oscar Pappenheimer mansion was the hub of chamber music from the 1890s through the 1920s. The Atlanta Music Club was formed in 1915, and was instrumental in establishing the Atlanta Symphony Orchestra (1923), the Choral Guild of Atlanta (1939, Atlanta's oldest independent chorus), and the Atlanta Youth Symphony Orchestra (1944) which in 1946 became the Atlanta Symphony Orchestra. A 1962 plane crash in Paris took the lives of more than 100 leading Atlanta art patrons, who were commemorated with the construction of the Memorial Arts Center (later the Robert W. Woodruff Memorial Arts Center).

Early venues for opera in Atlanta were DeGive's Opera House, built 1870, then DeGive's larger Grand Opera House, built 1893. From 1910 New York's Metropolitan Opera began its immensely popular series of Spring visits to Atlanta, lasting until 1986. Early efforts to establish local opera companies experienced difficulty. The Music Theatre Guild of Atlanta (1974) and the Atlanta Lyric Opera (1976). In 1977 the Guild was renamed Georgia Opera, moved to the Woodruff Arts Center and added an orchestra. In 1979 the Guild and Lyric operas merged to form the Atlanta Civic Opera, in 1985 reorganized as the Atlanta Opera, which moved to the Cobb Energy Performing Arts Centre just outside Atlanta in 2007.

== See also ==
- Atlanta record labels
- Atlanta Trumpet Festival
