= 688 Club =

Music venue in Atlanta, Georgia, United States

Coordinates: 33.7734°N 84.388551°W

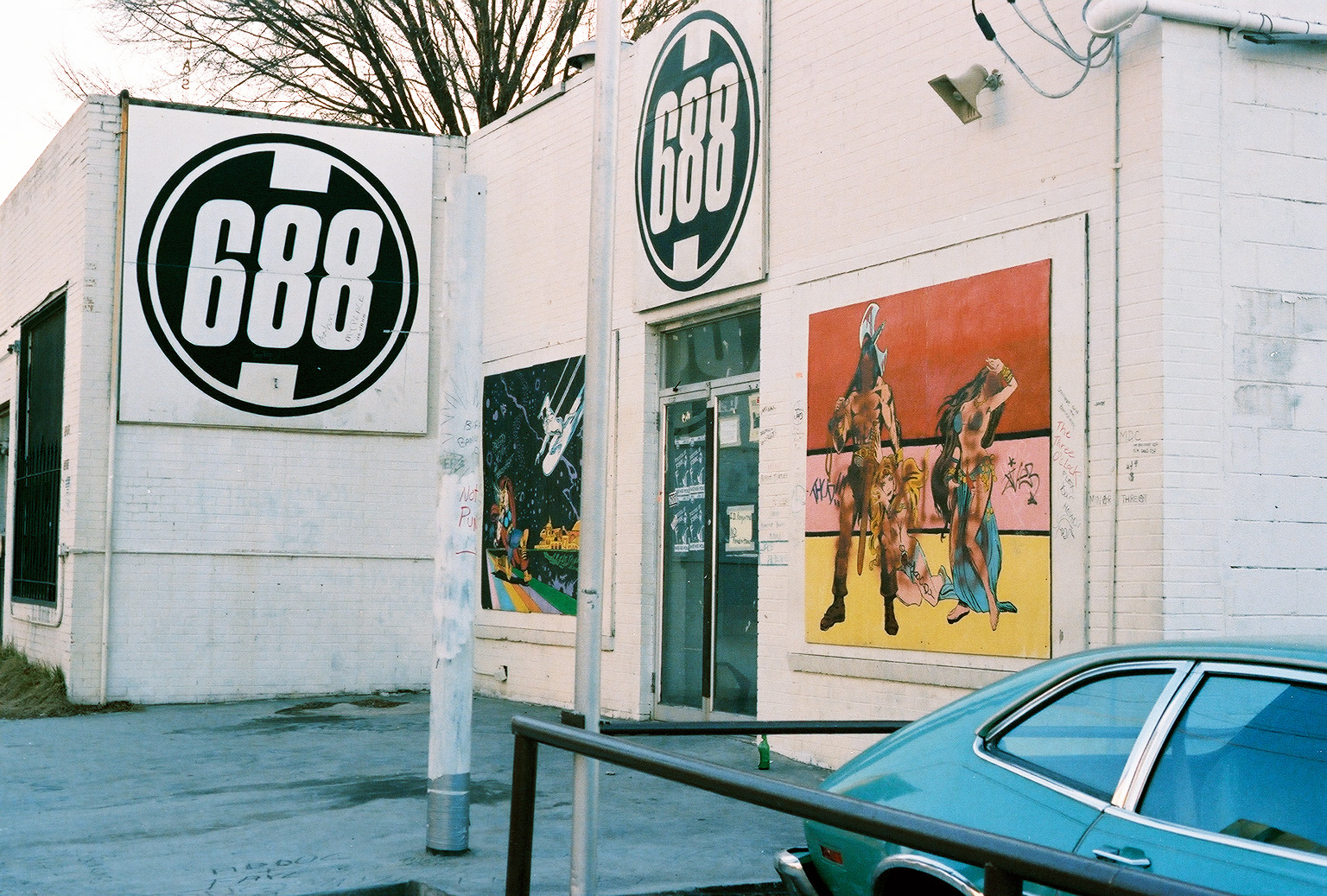
- 688 Club in 1984
- Interactive map of 688 Club
- Location: 688 Spring Street; Atlanta, Georgia, USA
- Owner: Steve May; Tony Evans; John Wicker; Sheila Browning; Mike Hendry
- Capacity: 300
- Type: Nightclub
- Events: New wave, alternative rock, post-punk, industrial, gothic

Construction
- Opened: May 1980
- Closed: November 1986

Website
- http://www.688club.com

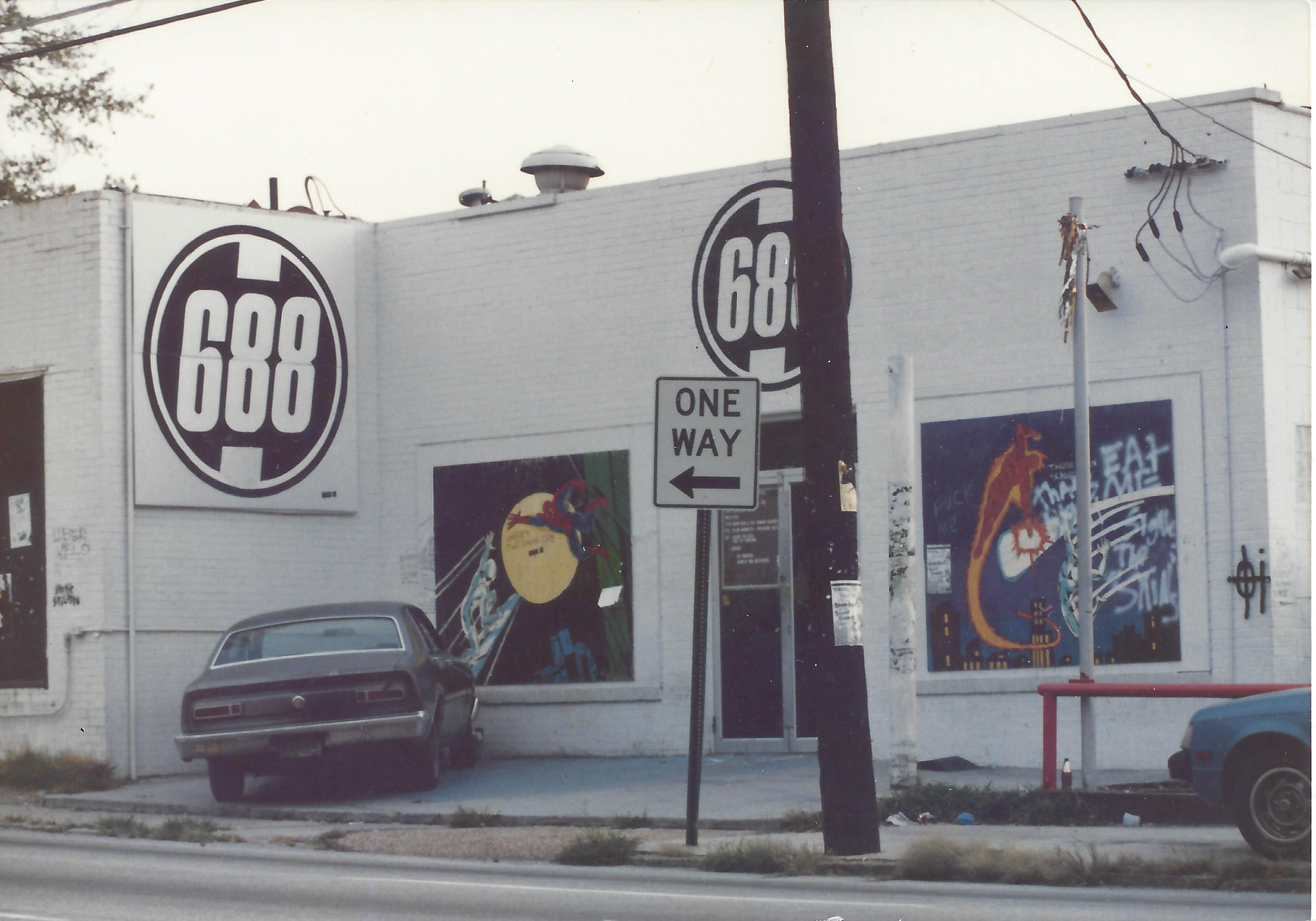
Club 688 in 1985

The 688 Club was a popular alternative music venue in Atlanta, Georgia, located at 688 Spring Street, near the intersection of Spring and 3rd Streets. The 688 Club opened in May 1980 and closed in November 1986. The club was operated by Steve May. The club was co-owned by Tony Evans, John Wicker, and in its final years by Mike Hendry. Cathy Hendrix served as the club's music director. During its brief lifetime, the 688 played host to hundreds of punk rock, new wave and alternative rock bands, many of whom would later become well known.

During the early 1980s, the 688 Club was the primary place for up-and-coming bands from Atlanta and Athens, Georgia, to get noticed. Among the groups that regularly played there were R.E.M. and Pylon. The club spun off an independent record label, 688 Records, which survived for a time even after 688 Club had closed. Dash Rip Rock's self-titled debut LP was the first album released by 688 Records.

== After 688 Club ==
The club re-opened as the "686 Club" on December 31, 1986, but was renamed "The Rollick" the next day. By 1990, the space was occupied by a club called "Weekends". The club was operated by an Atlanta attorney as an industrial/goth club known as Tyranny from 1995 - 2000. The space was later occupied by Outa Control Inc. Sometime thereafter, the original building was extensively remodeled. As of July 2012, it houses a Concentra urgent care medical facility.

== List of performers ==
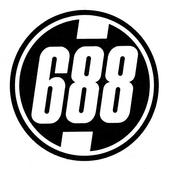
688 Club logo

A partial list of notable bands and artists that appeared at the 688 Club between 1980 and 1986:

- 10,000 Maniacs
- 999
- 8 Eyed Spy (Lydia Lunch)
- The Accelerators
- Alex Chilton
- The Bangles
- The Basics
- Billy Idol
- The Black Crowes (as "Mr. Crowe's Garden")
- Black Flag
- Bo Diddley
- The BoDeans
- The Bongos
- The Brains
- Glenn Branca
- Bush Tetras
- Butthole Surfers
- Cabaret Voltaire
- Certain General
- Chris Wood & The New Restraints
- Chubby Checker
- The Church
- Circle Jerks
- The Creatures
- The Cretones
- Dash Rip Rock
- DDT
- Dead Kennedys
- Dexy's Midnight Runners
- D.N.A.
- Dreams So Real
- Dream Syndicate
- Drivin' N' Cryin'
- Echo & the Bunnymen
- Einstürzende Neubauten
- The Exploited
- The Fall
- Fetchin' Bones
- Fishbone
- The Fleshtones
- Flipper
- A Flock of Seagulls
- Gang of Four
- The Go-Go's
- The Golden Palominos
- Guadalcanal Diary
- The Gun Club
- Hoodoo Gurus
- Human Sexual Response
- Hüsker Dü
- Iggy Pop
- INXS
- Jason & the Scorchers
- The Jesus and Mary Chain
- Jim Carroll
- Joe "King" Carrasco
- John Cale
- Johnny Clegg and Savuka
- Jonathan Richman
- Kevin McFoy Dunn
- Let's Active
- Love Tractor
- Lyres
- Marianne Faithfull
- Marshall Crenshaw
- Meat Puppets
- The Method Actors
- Minutemen
- Mr. Crowe's Garden
- New Order
- The Nightporters
- Now Explosion
- Oh OK
- Oingo Boingo
- Pete Shelley
- Peter Tork
- The Plague
- The Plastics
- The Plazza Drugs
- The Psychedelic Furs
- Public Image Ltd.
- Pylon
- Ramones
- Raves
- Raybeats
- Red Hot Chili Peppers
- R.E.M.
- The Replacements
- The Residents
- The Restraints
- Richard Hell and the Voidoids
- Robyn Hitchcock
- Rodney Crowell
- RuPaul
- Saccharine Trust
- Samhain
- The Side Effects
- Siouxsie and the Banshees
- The Smithereens
- Sonic Youth
- Specimen
- Stan Ridgway
- The Stranglers
- The Swimming Pool Q's
- The Swinging Richards
- Timbuk 3
- Translator
- U.K. Subs
- Uncle Green
- Uncle Bonsai
- The Vapors
- Vietnam
- Violent Femmes
- Voodoo Idols
- Wall of Voodoo
- Wee Wee Pole
- XTC
- X-teens
