= Scared Records =

American record label

- Founded: 1999
- Founder: Stan Satin
- Genre: Alternative, indie rock, electronic, IDM
- Country of origin: U.S.
- Location: Atlanta, Georgia
- Official website: www.scaredrecords.com

Scared Records is an independent American record label founded in Atlanta in 1999.

Founded by Stan Satin from his experience playing in Atlanta bands Vietnam and The Method Actors, Scared Records, whose name was chosen by subverting the defunct religious record label of the 1940s – 1950s Sacred Records, soon became the home for many of the Atlanta area's almost forgotten punk era bands such as The Restraints and Vietnam.

The label morphed out of Satin's earlier imprint, Spherecords, which had seen a limited release of his ambient electronic solo album entitled SonoVoX, as well as several releases by singer–songwriter Greg Connors.

The first release on the Scared Label (STF 0315) was an album by 315, whose limited 200-copy pressing of the self-titled 315 was a memorial to the local oddball artist, known as 315, who had contracted cancer and died in 2004.

The next release (SCR 8001) was labeled "Scarred" (with two "r's"), to commemorate the first release of a "lost" studio recording by Atlanta's first punk rock band, The Restraints, although the logo still incorporated the infamous laughing skull of Scared.

Twenty-five years in the making, Past Away (SRV 1213), the debut album by art-punk band Vietnam, was next to be released, featuring new recordings of original songs the band had composed in 1980–81.

== Artists ==
- Stan Satin
- Greg Connors
- The Restraints
- 315
- Vietnam
- The Subliminator
- Calcos
- Volants
- So A.D.D.
- Bunny Breath
- Bach On A Hook

== Sub-labels ==
A number of sub-labels have been connected to Scared.

- Spherecords
- Scarred Records
- Pearineel Records
- Doogah Music

== Discography ==
- Stan Satin • SonoVoX (originally on Spherecords) (SRV 1257, 1999)
- Greg Connors • Fluke EP (originally on Spherecords) (SRG 262, 1999)
- Front Street • Talkin' Dirty (originally on Spherecords) (FST 261, 1999)
- Greg Connors & The Curb • Invisible Tape (originally on Spherecords) (SGC 263, 2000)
- Greg Connors • Wide Awake Drunk (originally on Spherecords) (SRG 264, 2000)
- The Restraints • The Restraints (SCR 8001, 2002) (Scarred)
- 315 • 315 (STF 0315, 2004)
- The Subliminator • Recalibrated (SBR 955, 2005) (split release w/ Stickfigure Records)
- Vietnam • Past Away (SRV 1213, 2005)
- Greg Connors • Here, There and Anymore (SGC 1214, 2006)
- Bach On A Hook • Bach On A Stick (PEAR002, 2006) (Re-release of Pearineel Records release of 2000)
- clear your mind • seven facts (CYM 1215, unreleased)
- calcos • if i knew i'd tell you (SCL 1216, 2006)
- Volants • Everything Is So Perfect (SRV 1217, 2006)
- Vietnam • The Concrete's Always Greyer on the Other Side of the Street (SRV 1218 – catalog number not listed on the cover), 2007)
- So A.D.D. • 100 Years of Silence (SDD 1219, 2007)
- The Subliminator • Rake (SBR 956, 2008) (split release w/ Stickfigure Records)
- Greg Connors • Full Moon Flashlight (SGC 1220, 2009)
- Synchro Nine Factor • Right Wing Conspiracy (2009) (split release w/ Doogah Music)
- Bach On A Hook • Bach Off The Hook (SBH 1221, 2010)
- The Subliminator • Death Singing (SBR 957, 2011)
- Bunny Breath • Go Away / Not To Blame 7" vinyl single (SBB 1222, 2011)
- Bunny Breath • Bunny Breath (SBB 1223, 2011)

== See also ==
- List of record labels
