= Pass away =

Pass away is a euphemism for die.

Passed away may also refer to:

- Passed Away (film), an American ensemble comedy film from 1992
- Passed Away, Vol. 1, a digital compilation by Dr. Dog

== See also ==
- Past Away (album), a 2004 album by the band Vietnam
- WP:PASSEDAWAY, the official guidance from Wikipedia's Manual of Style regarding how to properly discuss death when editing this site
