= Testosterone (disambiguation) =

Testosterone is a naturally occurring male sex hormone.

Testosterone may also refer to:

== Medicine ==
- Testosterone (medication), the hormone used as a medication
  - Testosterone (patch), a medical patch designed to treat female sexual dysfunction

== Entertainment ==
- Testosterone (2003 film), American film
  - Testosterone (novel), 2000 novel by James Robert Baker and the basis for the film
- Testosterone (2004 film), Greek film by Giorgos Panousopoulos
- Testosterone (2007 film), Polish film by Tomasz Konecki
- Testosterone, 2003 British television documentary produced by Helen Littleboy
- "Testosterone", 2002 episode of This American Life

== Music ==
- Testosterone (Mustasch album) (2015)
- Testosterone, a 1995 album by Bill Davis
- Testosterone, a 1992 EP by Zonic Shockum
- "Testosterone", a 1995 song by Bush from "Comedown"
- "Testosterone", a 2016 song by the Descendents from Hypercaffium Spazzinate

== Other uses ==
- Testosterone, a horse that won the 2011 Prix de Royaumont
