= Not of This World (Dash Rip Rock album) =

Studio album by Dash Rip Rock
- Released: March 6, 1990
- Genre: Rock
- Label: Mammoth
- Producer: Jim Dickinson

Dash Rip Rock chronology
Ace of Clubs (1989)	Not of This World (1990)	Boiled Alive! (1991)

Not of This World is the third album by the American band Dash Rip Rock, released on March 6, 1990. The band supported the album with a North American tour.

== Production ==
Recorded in Memphis, live in the studio, the album was produced by Jim Dickinson. Chris Luckette joined on drums prior to the recording sessions. The band made an effort to focus on the melodies and songwriting, not simply the intensity of the performances. "Bum Fuk Egypt" is retitled "Bum for Egypt" on some formats of the album. "String You Up" praises the two "finest things" in the world, a beautiful woman and a Fender Telecaster. "I Don't Wanna Stop" is a cover of the LeRoi Brothers song. "Promenade" is performed as a ballad.

== Critical reception ==
Professional ratings
Review scores
Source	Rating
AllMusic	4.5/5 stars
The Cincinnati Enquirer	2/5 stars
Lincoln Journal Star	A
MusicHound Rock: The Essential Album Guide	3/5 stars
The Tampa Tribune	3/4 stars

The Morning Call said, "On first listen, the cranked-up guitars and cranky singing are just obnoxious; after a while, though, the orneriness seems less a pose and more like the real thing." The Tampa Tribune noted that the album "for the most part manages to capture the group's sometimes frantic [live] energy". The Cincinnati Enquirer opined that Dash Rip Rock "make homogenized tunes that could belong to any three-piece, punk-rock influenced bar band that's going nowhere." The Lincoln Journal Star labeled the band "reminiscent of the LeRoi Brothers in their relentless guitar attack". The Washington Post included Not of This World on its list of the best albums of 1990. Trouser Press stated that frontman Bill Davis "plays hot enough to light a small studio conflagration."

== Track listing ==
No.	Title	Length
1.	"Bum Fuk Egypt"
2.	"Under the Jail"
3.	"Rich Little Bitch"
4.	"You Were on My Mind"
5.	"Little Girl Blue"
6.	"String You Up"
7.	"Rattle Trap"
8.	"Jolie"
9.	"Promenade"
10.	"Betty"
11.	"Christmas in El Paso"
12.	"I Don't Wanna Stop"
