= Warning Light =

- Origin: Atlanta, Georgia, United States
- Genres: Drone, ambient, electronic
- Years active: 2003–present
- Labels: Sleepaway, Stickfigure
- Members: Drew Haddon
- Website: warninglight.blogspot.com

Warning Light is an American ambient/drone recording project primarily featuring multi instrumentalist Drew Haddon. The band has existed in various forms since 2003, and though formerly based out of Asheville, North Carolina is now in Atlanta, Georgia.

== History ==
Warning Light was originally just a catch all name used by Haddon to label all the various home recording projects he pursued while playing live with Atlanta experimental/noise rock band Suitcases. But after several years of open ended experimentation, the Warning Light sound began to center more on atmosphere and noise. In the mid-2000s, Haddon ran the DIY noise label Sleepaway Recordings, which would release a variety of tapes and CDrs by Warning Light and Suitcases. After several years of work in those projects, Haddon also briefly played in the psychedelic synth outfit Tree Creature and minimal synth outfit High Marks. During this time, Warning Light recorded nearly a dozen cassettes, CDrs and digital releases. In 2007, Stickfigure Records put out the album Eternity Drones, then followed by releasing the Further On album in early 2010. Haddon then played with Atlanta dance band Roman Photos for a couple years, then briefly with electronic act Kolossi.

In 2011 he released next full length album, Wild Silver, on Stickfigure Records as well, with a corresponding series of music videos. Haddon also runs Atlanta DIY label Persistentmidnight and performs in the electronic duo Snowbride.

== Discography ==
- "Window" (cassette, 2002)
- Split with Rioter With a Flare Gun (Sleepaway CDr, 2004)
- A Night Drive Through the Country (Sleepaway Tape, 2004)
- Texture Tones (Sleepaway Tape, 2005)
- Night Flight (Sleepaway 3" CDr, 2005)
- Two aka "2" (Sleepaway Tape and CDr, 2005)
- Demology+Complications EP (Sleepaway Tape, 2006)
- Live at Kirkwood Ballers Club with Dry Lungs (Sleepaway CDr, 2006)
- Labor EP (Sleepaway 3" CDr, 2006)
- Subterrain EP (Sleepaway 3" CDr, 2006)
- Eternity Drones (Stickfigure CDr, 2007)
- Split with Colossus (ESR Tape, 2007)
- Psychedelic Vampirism (internet blogspot release, 2008)
- Different Geographies (Sleepaway Recordings 2xCDr, 2008)
- Ritual compilation appearance (Heavy Nature, 2008)
- Unknown Clearing (Tiny Kraken CDr, 2009)
- Further On (Stickfigure CD, 2010)
- Crystal Growing Kit 4 c20 compilation appearance (Serip, 2010)
- Early Birds EP (Beacon Light Communications CDr, 2010)
- Fallow (free download release, 2010)
- Live at the Eyedrum w/ Runaway Five and Young Again (Eyedrum Tapes, 2010)
- "Starry Way EP" (Beacon Light Communications, 2011)
- "New Pilgrimage EP" (Beacon Light Communications, 2011)
- "Wild Silver" (Stickfigure CD 2011)
- "Blacked Out" (cassingle/CDr 2012)
- "Tre Parte Omicidio" split with Repeated Viewing (Persistentmidnight cassette 2012)
- "Half Futures" (self released 2012)
- "Night Time" (limited cassette 2013)
- "Beyond" (self released 2013)
- "The Lost Patterns (DKA cassette 2014)
- "XXXI" (Stickfigure CD 2014)
- "Heavens Above, Heavens Below (Persistentmidnight double CDr 2015)
- "Quiet on the Homefront EP" (Persistentmidnight CDr 2015)
