= WCLK =

Jazz music public radio station in Atlanta, Georgia, United States

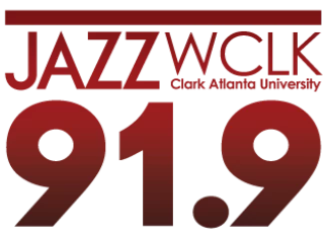
- Atlanta, Georgia; United States
- Broadcast area: Metro Atlanta
- Frequency: 91.9 MHz (HD Radio)
- Branding: Jazz 91.9

Programming
- Format: Jazz
- Affiliations: NPR

Ownership
- Owner: Clark Atlanta University

History
- First air date: April 10, 1974; 52 years ago
- Call sign meaning: "Clark"

Technical information
- Licensing authority: FCC
- Facility ID: 11675
- Class: A
- ERP: 480 watts
- HAAT: 302 meters (991 ft)
- Transmitter coordinates: 33°48′26″N 84°20′22″W
- Translator: 99.3 W257DF (Atlanta)

Links
- Public license information: Public file; LMS
- Webcast: Listen Live
- Website: wclk.com

WCLK (91.9 FM) – branded as Jazz 91.9 – is a non-commercial jazz radio station licensed to serve Atlanta, Georgia. Owned by Clark Atlanta University, the station covers much of the Atlanta metropolitan area. The WCLK studios are located on the Clark University campus at the lower level of the Robert W. Woodruff Library on James P. Brawley Drive in the West End section of Atlanta, while the station transmitter is located in the city's North Druid Hills section. In addition to a standard analog transmission, WCLK broadcasts in HD Radio. and is available online.

== History ==
On April 10, 1974, WCLK signed on the air for the first time. Initially, it only broadcast at 54 watts, on a 340-foot tower. Its coverage area only extended a few miles around Clark College, a precursor to Clark Atlanta before its merger with Atlanta University in 1988. Over time, its power and antenna height were upgraded, giving the station a signal that covers all of Atlanta and its adjacent suburbs. WCLK was granted a Federal Communications Commission construction permit in early 2009 to downgrade its effective radiated power (ERP) from 6,000 watts to 480 watts, but its antenna height above average terrain was more than tripled, going to 991 feet from 308 feet, so its overall coverage area remained the same as before.

WCLK previously aired several NPR talk and information shows not heard on Atlanta's primary NPR station, WABE, during the time that WABE's schedule included daytime broadcasts of classical music. When WABE switched to news and talk for most of the day starting in 2014, WCLK dropped the NPR talk shows to air a schedule of mostly jazz music and related genres, but remains affiliated with NPR for some news and jazz programming.

WCLK collaborated with the City of Atlanta to create the Jazz of the City Atlanta portrait featuring over 100 jazz musicians surrounding Mayor Shirley Franklin in the Atlanta City Hall Atrium. The color photograph by Seve "Obasina" Adigun and Gregory Turner, taken in April 2007, mirrors the iconic, classic, black-and-white image, A Great Day in Harlem 1958 by Art Kane.

Nationally distributed shows produced at WCLK include Jazz in the New Millennium and The SOUL of Jazz. Both are distributed by the African-American Public Radio Consortium.

WCLK was relayed by two broadcast translators, whose ranges were entirely within its main broadcast area. Its former six-watt translator W250BC in Riverdale was sold for $100,000 to Extreme Media Group in November 2007, then to commercial broadcaster Cumulus Media in February 2009. WCLK was then relayed by W275BK in Decatur, which broadcast 170 watts on 102.9, owned by the Radio Assist Ministry.

WCLK currently has an FM translator, W209CG, 89.7 MHz in Tallapoosa, Georgia.

== See also ==
- List of jazz radio stations in the United States
