= Bill Davis (musician) =

American singer-songwriter

- Origin: New Orleans, Louisiana, United States
- Genre: Cowpunk
- Occupations: Singer, guitarist, songwriter
- Instruments: Guitar, vocals
- Years active: 1984–present
- Labels: 688, Mammoth, Alternative Tentacles, Ichiban
- Member of: Dash Rip Rock
- Website: www.dashriprock.net

Bill Davis (born New Orleans, Louisiana) is an American guitarist, vocalist, and songwriter. He is the founder, lead guitarist, and lead vocalist of the rock band Dash Rip Rock, and a member of the Louisiana Music Hall of Fame. Davis founded Dash Rip Rock in 1984 and is often credited as a pioneer of cowpunk, a genre that combines country and punk rock, but Davis has said in interviews that he considers his music to be widely roots-based. His work has been inspired by a variety of styles, including rock, country, power pop, punk, soul and, at times, Cajun.

The Austin Chronicle called him "the brains behind Dash's brawn, a barroom poet with a wicked sense of humor and a shameless knack for a good lick."

== Other projects ==
Davis contributed guitar work and backing vocals on six songs on Glenn Tilbrook's (lead singer and guitarist of the British band Squeeze) solo album titled Transatlantic Ping Pong. His guitar work is also featured on Mojo Nixon's Root Hog or Die, and on the country punk supergroup Otis album that featured John Doe, Bill Davis, and Country Dick Montana and was produced by Jim Dickinson. He also was a guitarist for two years with Trent Summar and the New Row Mob. In 2013 Davis contributed guitar work and vocals on The Vibrators song "Rock N' Roll Clown" for their record On the Guest List. In 2011 and 2014, Davis was a member and founder of the sometimes band Jello Biafra and the New Orleans Raunch & Soul All-Stars. In 2012, he played lead guitar for a special show in New Orleans featuring Clarence "Blowfly (musician)" Reid, the grandfather of dirty rap. In 2014 Punk News announced that Bill Davis would be appearing on lead guitar and lead vocals on a track on a forthcoming Black Oak Arkansas tribute album with Greg Ginn of Black Flag, Paul Leary and Jeff Pinkus of Butthole Surfers, Shooter Jennings, and others.

In 2014, Davis was writing for both a forthcoming solo release and a new Dash Rip Rock record and playing live with Dash Rip Rock. He spoke with a New Orleans journalist about some of his earliest guitar influences:

"A bunch of really strange guitar players I met in the 80s really influenced me. Danny Gatton, who committed suicide, was one of the most monstrous Telecaster players to ever walk the planet. Gatton worked with another guy I met named Evan Johns. They were both from Washington, D.C. and played in rockabilly bands, but the rockabilly kind of turned punk. Evan introduced me to Danny Gatton’s style," Davis said. "Going way back, I loved Ace Frehley from Kiss. It was really simple. I like guitar that has a country flavor. Pete Townshend is another one, and Bily Zoom from the band X really inspired the punk rock side of my style."

In 2015, Davis formed an alt-country band called The Convergers. The band released their debut EP "Hang-Dog Hymns" on the Drag Snake label. In 2017 he formed the post-garage country rock band Borealis Rex - they released a CD (Cut Your Teeth) and vinyl LP (Dawn 'Til Done) on Drag Snake Records. In 2023, Dash Rip Rock released the album "Cowpunk." It was produced and engineered by Dave Catching at Rancho de La Luna recording studio in Joshua Tree, California.

== Selected discography ==
with Dash Rip Rock:

- Dash Rip Rock (1987, 688 Records/Mammoth)
- Ace of Clubs (1989, Mammoth)
- Not of This World (1990, Mammoth) (Produced by Jim Dickinson)
- Boiled Alive (1991, Mammoth)
- Tiger Town (1993, Doctor Dream)
- Get You Some of Me (1995, Sector Two/Ichiban)
- Testosterone (1995, Australian-only release)
- Dash Rip Rock's Gold Record (1996. Ichiban)
- Paydirt (1998, PC Music)
- Hits and Giggles (2000)
- Sonic Boom (2003, Write On)
- Live from the Bottom of the Hill (limited release, 2003)
- Recyclone (2005, Alternative Tentacles)
- Hee Haw Hell (2007, Alternative Tentacles)
- Country Girlfriend (2008, Abitian)
- Black Liquor (2012, Alternative Tentacles)
- Wrongheaded (2015, Drag Snake)
- Cherchez La Femme (2021, Drag Snake)
- Cowpunk (2023, Drag Snake and Whiskey Tan)

with other musicians:

- Mojo Nixon Root Hog and Die (1989, IRS)
- Mojo Nixon, John Doe, Country Dick Montana, Eric Ambel Otis (1990, Enigma)
- Swingin Haymakers For Rent (1995, Circle Records)
- Trent Sumnar & The New Row Mob Live at 12th and Porter (2003, DCN Records)
- Glenn Tilbrook Transatlantic Ping Pong (2004, Compass)
- The Vibrators On The Guest List (2013, Cleopatra)
- Jello Biafra & the New Orleans Raunch and Soul All-Stars Walk on Jindal's Splinters (2015, Alternative Tentacles)
- The Convergers "Hang-Dog Hymns" (2016, Drag Snake)
- Borealis Rex Cut Your Teeth (2017, Drag Snake)
- Borealis Rex Dawn "Til Done (2019, Drag Snake)
- J.D. Pinkus, Greg Ginn, Eddie Spaghetti, Nik Turner, Rickie Lee Reynolds, Jim "Dandy" Mangrum, Shooter Jennings, Jeff Clayton, Paul Leary, Jello Biafra, Joey Killingsworth, Mickey Rafael, "Mutants of the Monster" (2016, Saustex)

== Filmography ==
- Outside Industry: The Story of SXSW
- The Bad, the Rad, and the Mono
- Free State of Jones
- The Mojo Manifesto - The Life and Times of Mojo Nixon

== Sources ==
- Deming, Mark (Dec. 2012). "Dash Rip Rock: Black Liquor". All Music Guide
- Lien, James (March 1998). Brief History of New Orleans Rock. OffBeat (New Orleans, Louisiana)
- Starrs, Chris (Feb 16, 2012). "Dash Rip Rock Starts Year on High Note". Athens Banner-Herald (Athens, Georgia)
- Fensterstock, Allison (Jan 13, 2012). "Today Is Dash Rip Rock Day, says Dash Rip Rock". Times-Picayune (New Orleans, Louisiana)
- Fensterstock, Allison (Dec 12, 2012). "Veteran Rockers Dash Rip Rock Blend Old and New on Latest Album, Black Liquor". Times-Picayune (New Orleans, Louisiana)
- Gentile, John. (Feb. 18, 2013). "Dash Rip Rock, Black Liquor." Punk News.
- Milano, Brett (Feb 22, 2023) "Dash Rip Rock, Cowpunk." OffBeat (New Orleans, Louisiana)
- Moser, Margaret (Jan 22, 2008), "Hee Haw Hell". Austin Chronicle.
- Sasfy, Joe. (May 8, 1987). "Dash Rip Rock Rolls Good." The Washington Post.
- Wirt, John (Dec 18, 2012). "Just A Dash of Rock". Morning Advocate (Baton Rouge, Louisiana)
- Everett, Matthew (May 9, 2013). "Dash Rip Rock". Metropulse (Knoxville, TN)
- Kopp, Bill (June 4, 2013). "Album Review: The Vibrators – On the Guest List". Musoscribe
- Swanson, Dave (June 5, 2015). "Album Review: Jello Biafra, A Walk on Jindal's Splinters." Diffuser. Jello Biafra, 'A Walk on Jindal's Splinters' - Album Review

== See also ==
- Louisiana Music Hall of Fame
