= Book of Bad Thoughts =

Studio album by Uncle Green
- Released: 1992
- Genres: Power pop; alternative rock
- Label: Atlantic
- Producer: Brendan O'Brien

Uncle Green chronology
What an Experiment His Head Was (1991)	Book of Bad Thoughts (1992)

Book of Bad Thoughts is an album by the American band Uncle Green. It was released in 1992 via Atlantic Records. Book of Bad Thoughts was the band's final album, although all four members would regroup as 3 Lb. Thrill.

The album's first single was "I Know All About You". Uncle Green supported the album by opening for the Levellers on a North American tour.

== Production ==
The album was produced by Brendan O'Brien, who also played organ on a number of tracks. The singer and guitar player Matt Brown wrote three-fourths of the songs on the album; Uncle Green rerecorded two songs from What an Experiment His Head Was. Book of Bad Thoughts was recorded in Los Angeles; the band was allowed complete control over all aspects of the album's production. Uncle Green used a Mellotron on the opening track.

== Critical reception ==
Professional ratings
Review scores
Source	Rating
AllMusic	4.5/5 stars
Chicago Tribune	3.5/4 stars
The Republican	2/5 stars
The Tampa Tribune	2.5/4 stars

Trouser Press wrote: "Although not a great album—too much of the writing is overweening, and there are times when it sounds like the work of two separate bands—Book of Bad Thoughts is a solid effort from a thoughtful and practical outfit." The Chicago Tribune thought that "'You`re Getting Into It', with its interweaving mellotron and accordion, is the sound of a band flexing newly discovered muscles." Stereo Review opined that "Uncle Green betrays a romantic fatalism worthy of Squeeze in 'She's Storing It Up', admitting that the inevitable comeuppance is deserved while guitars arpeggiate restlessly." The Republican allowed that the band "possesses some fairly sharp pop sensibilities but reveals little else over the course of 12 tracks."

Billboard concluded that the band "scores big on seamless major-label debut that bristles with hook-laden tunes à la Beatles circa 1966." The Washington Post determined that "principal songwriter Matt Brown seems most comfortable when emulating the music-hall-influenced style of Squeeze." The Indianapolis Star deemed the album "immensely likeable." The Atlanta Journal-Constitution wrote that the songs "have the kind of clean, ringing wallop that used to make AM radio such godhead, while the band's chops are still raw enough to reek ever so slightly of the garage."

AllMusic called it "a little-heard gem—a '90s rock record of the highest order."

== Track listing ==
No.	Title	Length
1.	"I Know All About You"
2.	"I Don't Wanna Know About It"
3.	"Wake Up Now"
4.	"Look into the Light"
5.	"Bellingham"
6.	"She's Storing It Up"
7.	"You're Getting into It"
8.	"In Good Time"
9.	"He Woke Up Naked"
10.	"The Blue Light"
11.	"A Good Man"
12.	"I Always Knew You'd Come to Me"
