= I Would Set Myself on Fire for You =

American screamo band

- Origin: Atlanta, Georgia, U.S.
- Genres: Screamo; post-hardcore; experimental rock; post-rock
- Years active: 2001–2007
- Labels: Stickfigure Records
- Past members: Lindsey Leigh Harbour; Tyler Dale Walters; Stephen Matthew Newhouse; Justin Karl Lane; Paul Myron Hobson; Danny Lee Sloderbeck

I Would Set Myself on Fire for You was an American experimental screamo band from Atlanta that formed in 2001 and broke up for unknown reasons in 2007.

The band released two albums on Stickfigure Records, in between several demos sold at concerts during the time they were together. Another 7" record, which the band announced to "be released in the near future" was initially supposed to be released on Delian League Records but couldn't be released due to damaged test pressings. The two songs were finally released in 2012 as a download on the band's Bandcamp site. The band featured instruments including viola, acoustic guitar, cello, synthesizer, saxophone, trumpet, and hand drums in their songs. The use of unconventional instrumentals, and a vocal style that utilized three singers, helped set I Would Set Myself on Fire apart from other similar bands in the post-hardcore genre.

== Members ==
Final lineup

- Lindsey Leigh Harbour – vocals, viola, cello, violin (2001–2007)
- Tyler Dale Walters – vocals, synthesizer (2001–2007)
- Stephen Mattew Newhouse – vocals, guitars (2001–2007)
- Justin Karl Lane – vocals, bass (2001–2007)
- Paul Myron Hobson – drums, synthesizer (2001–2007)

Former members

- Danny Lee Sloderbeck – guitar, vocals (2001–2003)
- Adam Newman – guitar, vocals (2003)

== Discography ==
Studio albums

- I Would Set Myself on Fire for You (Stickfigure Records, 2003)
- Believes in Patterns (Stickfigure Records, 2006)
