= Paydirt (album) =

Studio album by Dash Rip Rock
- Released: 1998
- Genres: Cowpunk, pop rock
- Label: PC
- Producer: Fred LeBlanc

Dash Rip Rock chronology
Dash Rip Rock's Gold Record (1996)	Paydirt (1998)	Sonic Boom (2002)

Paydirt is an album by the American band Dash Rip Rock, released in 1998. It was the band's first album to be distributed by a major label. Dash Rip Rock supported the album with a North American tour.

== Production ==
The album was produced by former member Fred LeBlanc, who also cowrote the songs. Kyle Melancon took over on drums, replacing Chris Luckette. It was the band's intention to make a more radio-friendly record; they had decided to pull back from national touring if Paydirt was not a success. Some of the album's songs were already band live staples.

The song "King Death" was written in tribute to Country Dick Montana. Tab Benoit contributed guitar to "String You Up"; "Singin' the Blues" is a cover of the Marty Robbins song.

== Critical reception ==
Professional ratings
Review scores
Source	Rating
AllMusic	3/5 stars
The Austin Chronicle	3/5 stars
Los Angeles Times	3.5/4 stars
The Tampa Tribune	3/4 stars
The Times-Picayune	3/5 stars

The Washington Post called the album "a Dixie-fried, swamp-soaked version of NRBQ." OffBeat wrote that the band "has largely abandoned the hard rock, punkabilly and song parodies of recent years in favor of a triumphant return to their countrified pop roots."

The Los Angeles Times wrote: "With Paydirt, this notoriously rowdy and raucous trio counterbalances its own typical tendencies by tempering the raunch with brisk smart-pop offerings and even some serious, wistful and lovely jangle-rock numbers far more redolent of R.E.M.'s sober Athens, Ga., classicism than the whiskey-drenched roadhouse mayhem Dash has been bootlegging out of New Orleans for nearly 15 years." The Times-Picayune deemed the album "a collection of mostly mid-tempo, crisp guitar pop."

== Track listing ==
No.	Title	Length
1.	"King Death"	2:12
2.	"She's Got a Lot Of"	2:00
3.	"String You Up"	3:22
4.	"Drivin' Feelin'"	3:17
5.	"Singin' the Blues"	2:38
6.	"Best Reason"	2:44
7.	"Clown Down"	3:08
8.	"Markers Down"	3:14
9.	"False Prophet"	2:47
10.	"Think of Me"	2:57
11.	"Call Me"	3:00
12.	"Anchor Me"	2:50
13.	"Fly to the Gulf"	4:44
14.	"Bonus"	5:30

== Personnel ==
- Bill Davis – guitar, vocals
- Hoaky Hickel – bass
- Kyle Melancon – drums
