= Dash Rip Rock =

American rock band

- Origin: Formed in Baton Rouge, Louisiana, relocated to New Orleans, Louisiana, United States
- Genres: Rock, cowpunk, alternative rock, alternative country, punkabilly, rockabilly
- Years active: 1984–present
- Labels: 688, Mammoth, Alternative Tentacles, Ichiban, Drag Snake
- Members: Bill Davis, Wade Hymel, Izzy Grisoli
- Website: Official Website

Dash Rip Rock is an American rock band. The band is best known for its cowpunk sound, which mixes punk rock, rockabilly, hard rock, country and boogie. The New York Times stated that Dash Rip Rock combines “fluency in American roots music with a robust dose of punk-rock spirit.” Dash Rip Rock has toured consistently for decades. Bill Davis, Dash Rip Rock's founder and frontman, is a songwriter known for his blistering guitar work. Spin praised Dash Rip Rock as “undeniably the South’s greatest rock band.” In 2012, Dash Rip Rock was inducted into the Louisiana Music Hall of Fame.

"Their roots sound's supercharged with energy and an overdose of irreverence, delivered with crunchy swagger," Creative Loafing wrote.

== History ==
Guitarist, songwriter, and vocalist Bill Davis formed Dash Rip Rock as a three-piece band during the summer of 1984. Davis was influenced by the early 1980s American roots rock revival, embodied by such acts as Rank and File, The LeRoi Brothers, The Beat Farmers, The Stray Cats, and Jason & the Scorchers.

The other two original members were bassist Ned "Hoaky" Hickel and F. Clarke Martty on drums. All three were veterans of the post-punk scene. Originally, the band focused on revved up country and rockabilly, with Martty playing a simple stand-up drum kit and members sporting cowboy shirts, and bolo ties. "No one can replace Bill Davis," the Austin Chronicle wrote in 2008. "He’s the brains behind Dash’s brawn, a barroom poet with a wicked sense of humor and a shameless knack for a good lick. He doesn't mind taking good-natured potshots at New Orleans icons like Aaron Neville but he’s capable of writing memorable heartbreakers like “Endeavor.”

Dash Rip Rock released a self-titled debut album in 1986 on 688 Records. In 1988 the band recorded its second album, Ace of Clubs, on Mammoth Records. Dash Rip Rock toured with The Cramps, The Reverend Horton Heat, The dB's and others. In the 1990s, Dash Rip Rock's song "Let's Go Smoke Some Pot", a parody of Danny and the Juniors' "At the Hop" became a tongue-in-cheek staple of the band's live shows and a nationwide radio hit that has since been covered by many bands. The parody has been adopted by some as a pro-marijuana song. Its popularity soars on April 20 every year

In 2005 Jello Biafra released Dash Rip Rock's retrospective CD Recyclone on the Alternative Tentacles label, followed in 2007 by Dash's first concept album, a punk rock opera based on Dante's Inferno, Hee Haw Hell. August 1, 2008 saw the release of a new studio album, Country Girlfriend.

In 2010, the Houston Press deemed DRR one of the "Top 10 Louisiana Bands of All Time." Bill Davis was also featured in the documentary, Outside Industry: The Story of SXSW. In 2010, Dash Rip Rock's song "Johnny Ace" was featured in the video game Rock Band.

In 2011, Bill Davis also joined Jello Biafra to form Jello Biafra and the New Orleans Raunch & Soul All-Stars. After selecting songs and recruiting musicians, DRR's Bill Davis and this one-time-only band of mostly-Louisiana rockers played a special show in New Orleans. The band featured Jello Biafra, Bill Davis (Dash Rip Rock), Pepper Keenan (DOWN and Corrosion of Conformity), and others.

In 2012, Dash Rip Rock was inducted into the Louisiana Music Hall of Fame. In November 2012, Alternative Tentacles Dash Rip Rock released DRR's new album Black Liquor. It was recorded at Studio in the Country in Bogalusa, Louisiana, and produced by Ben Mumphrey. Bill Davis of Dash Rip Rock also cut the track "Rock 'N' Roll Clown" for an album by The Vibrators that was released on Cleopatra Records in 2013. Dash Rip Rock also recorded a tribute album to Billy Joe Shaver that was released in 2013 on Whiskey Bayou Records. It was produced by Tab Benoit. In 2013 Dash Rip Rock played back-up for a one-time only show with southern rock pioneers Jim "Dandy" Mangum and Rickey Lee “Risky” Reynolds of Black Oak Arkansas. In 2014 Punk News announced that Bill Davis of Dash Rip Rock would be appearing on lead guitar and lead vocals on a track on a forthcoming Black Oak Arkansas tribute album with Greg Ginn of Black Flag, Paul Leary and Jeff Pinkus of Butthole Surfers, Shooter Jennings, and others. Mutants of the Monster: A Tribute to Black Oak Arkansas was released by Saustex Records in 2016.

In 2023, Dash Rip Rock released the album Cowpunk. It was produced and engineered by Dave Catching at Rancho de La Luna recording studio in Joshua Tree, California.

In February 2024, Dash Rip Rock's Bill Davis lost his friend, mentor, former touring partner, and former Otis bandmate, Mojo Nixon, while Dash Rip Rock was performing on SiriusXM's Outlaw Country Cruise.

In August 2024, Dash Rip Rock recorded six songs for a proposed vinyl EP at Dial Back Sound in Water Valley, Mississippi. The session was produced by Bobby Matt Patton, bassist for the Drive-By Truckers and owner of Dial Back Sound Studio. Patton has also played with Laura Jane Grace & the Mississippi Medicals, the Dexateens, and Model Citizen. Those songs were eventually released on the full length LP ‘’A Song For Everyone’’ in January 2026. In 2024, Dash Rip Rock's Bill Davis contributed lead guitar tracks for the Laura Jane Grace & the Mississippi Medicals song "Razor Blade Blues."

== Discography ==
=== Studio albums ===
- Dash Rip Rock (1986, 688 Records)
- Ace of Clubs (1989, Mammoth Records)
- Not of This World (1990, Mammoth Records)
- Tiger Town (1993, Doctor Dream Records)
- Get You Some of Me (1996, Ichiban Records/Naked Language Records)
- Paydirt (1998, P.C. Records)
- Sonic Boom (2002, Write On Records)
- Hee Haw Hell (2007, Alternative Tentacles)
- Country Girlfriend (2008, Abitian)
- Call of the Wild (2010, Alternative Tentacles)
- Black Liquor (2012, Alternative Tentacles)
- Dash Does Shaver (2013, Whiskey Bayou Records)
- Wrongheaded (2015, Drag Snake Records)
- Cowpunk (2023, Drag Snake/Whiskey Tan Records)
- A Song In Everyone (2026, Dial Back Sound)

=== Live albums ===
- Boiled Alive! (1991, Mammoth Records)

=== Compilations ===
- Dash Rip Rock's Gold Record (1996, Ichiban)
- Testosterone (1997, Festival Records)
- Hits and Giggles (2000, Pravda)
- Recyclone (2004, Alternative Tentacles)

== See also ==
- Louisiana Music Hall of Fame
- Larry Pennell, who portrayed the character "Dash Riprock" in 10 episodes of The Beverly Hillbillies between 1965 and 1969.
