= X-teens =

American pop group

- X-teens in 1981. From left: Alden Hart, Kitty Moses, Robert Bittle, Ned Robie, and Todd Jones

Background information
- Origin: Durham, North Carolina, USA
- Genres: Pop; new wave; post-punk; progressive pop
- Years active: 1979-1985
- Labels: ARTNiK, Dolphin Records (Record Bar), Moonlight Records

X-teens was an American new wave rock band formed in Durham, North Carolina in 1979 and often identified as part of the North Carolina punk/new wave scene of the 1980s. After disbanding in 1985, the members went on to form other bands, such as 4 Who Dared, Land of Giants and Money vs. People.

== History ==
=== Formation (1979) ===
X-teens were formed when Kitty Moses (vocals, bass) recruited childhood friends Todd Jones (keyboards, vocals, guitars) and Robert Bittle (guitars, vocals), and enlisted jam partner Ned Robie (drums) to form a band to play a mixture of covers and original music. Soon after the foursome began to play, they were joined by Alden Hart, who provided synthesizer and sound reinforcement, until leaving the group in 1982. The band worked on cover material that included Elvis Costello, The Jam, Devo, X-Ray Spex, Pere Ubu, The Ramones, and Nancy Sinatra, but with equal amounts of original material primarily written by Bittle and Jones. Their first gig was on December 7, 1979, at Duke University’s Down Under, a campus club. All the X-teens were students at Duke, except Bittle, who was at UNC Chapel Hill. The band name was suggested by Moses during one of a series of scattershot brainstorming sessions. The other members quickly circled around the name.

=== Big Boy’s Dream (1980) ===
After being favorably received in area clubs, X-teens were approached by Dave Robert, owner of Moonlight Records. They recorded a five song EP at TGS studios, produced by Don Dixon and engineered by Steve Gronback, which featured a broad range of material from 13/4 power pop to grungy punk and electronica.

The band continued performing regionally, where they were developing a following in clubs like Chapel Hill, NC's Cat's Cradle, Carrboro, NC's The Station, Raleigh, NC's The Pier (The Village Subway), and Greensboro, NC's Friday's.

=== Eponymous (1982) ===
Don Dixon then approached producer Mitch Easter to collaborate on an X-teens spec album that would be shopped to record labels. Easter agreed and the band started work on a full length LP simply named X-teens, to be recorded at his “Drive-In” studio. The record comprised 14 songs spanning genres of polka, metal, straight line pop and baroque music.

The band released a 45 single from the spec project, with Bittle’s Anyone Can on the A-side and Jones’s Nothing Left to Say on the B-side. The single was released on the band’s own ARTNiK label. The band performed a video of Anyone Can on the children’s show Barney’s Army.

Dolphin Records, a subsidiary of record retailer Record Bar, acquired the rights to the Eponymous LP and signed the band to an extended contract.

Managed by Dolphin Records' Josh Grier, the band started touring, playing venues like the 688 Club, the Cubby Bear, Danceteria, Maxwells, and the 9:30 Club.

=== Love and Politics (1984) ===
Producer Don Dixon then took the band into Reflection Sound Studios, in Charlotte, NC. Their second full length record was titled Love and Politics and featured a similar variety of styles, but with a more accessible sound. A music video was made of the Jones track Change Gotta Come, produced by LV Productions, Charlotte, NC, directed by Courtney Taylor, featuring the X-teens and Charlotte, NC radio personality John Boy, with art direction by Academy Awards nominee William Craig Smith. It was put on rotation on MTV and other cable programs such as Nickelodeon's Nick Rocks and USA Network's Night Flight.

The band embarked on a summer tour of the Northeast and Midwest in 1984 in support of the record, where they were able to capitalize on national radio and video play.

=== Band Breakup (1985) ===
Increasing discord within the band culminated in its demise less than six years after its inception. Their last gig was on February 23, 1985, at the Cat's Cradle.

=== Legacy and Critical Response ===
X-teens garnered attention in college and independent radio across the US as well as having the Love and Politics LP released in Japan and Europe.

Critics were largely favorable, with Trouser Press's Ira Robbins describing the band’s sound as “excellent pure pop ... utterly free of guile and bogus commercial compromises.”

Big Boy’s Dream was more of a regional release, whereas Eponymous and Love and Politics saw a presence on the college and independent radio charts. In August 1984, Love and Politics peaked at #20 on CMJ New Music Report's progressive radio chart, and #5 on Boston Rock's independent radio chart. CMJ New Music Report's "The Tops of 1984" also had it at #81 in the top 100 for progressive radio and #63 for college rock.

Love and Politics was one of The Wall Street Journal's noteworthy rock releases and a Billboard recommended LP in 1984.

Rolling Stone magazine gave the compilation album Mondo Montage two and a half stars, with "special nods to the X-teens."

The video of Change Gotta Come was in rotation on MTV in 1984 as well as on Nick Rocks and Night Flight. It has over 10,000 hits on YouTube.

== Critical Reviews and Charts ==
=== Big Boy's Dream ===
- Trouser Press

=== Eponymous ===
- CMJ New Music Report, Essential New Music
- Trouser Press

=== Love and Politics ===
- Billboard, Billboard's Recommended LPs
- Billboard, New Videos Added, Change Gotta Come
- Boston Rock, Independent #5, #10, #13
- CMJ New Music Report, Essential New Music, Jackpot!
- CMJ New Music Report, Progressive Radio Top 100 #20
- CMJ New Music Report, The Tops of 1984, Progressive Radio Top 100 #81, College Radio #63
- Gavin Report, Recommended Listening by Kent Zimmerman
- Mademoiselle, Music
- Rock & Folk, Disques
- Star Hits, Short Cuts
- Trouser Press
- The Wall Street Journal, Good Vibrations: Noteworthy Rock Releases

=== Mondo Montage (compilation) ===
- Rolling Stone, Records

== Personnel ==
- Robert Bittle - guitars, vocals
- Todd Jones - keyboards, vocals, guitars
- Kitty Moses - bass, vocals
- Ned Robie - drums
- Alden Hart - computer synthesizer, sounds (1979-1982)

Songwriting was largely shared by Bittle and Jones.

== Discography ==
=== Albums ===
- Eponymous (1982, Dolphin)
- Mondo Montage - Heaven In Your Eyes (Compilation) (1983, Dolphin)
- Love and Politics (1984, Dolphin)

=== EPs ===
- Big Boy’s Dream (1980, Moonlight)

=== Singles ===
- Anyone Can/Nothing Left to Say (1981, ARTNiK)
- Hard is a Love Departing (Remix) (1982, Dolphin)

=== Music videos ===
- Anyone Can
- Change Gotta Come
