= Uncle Bonsai =

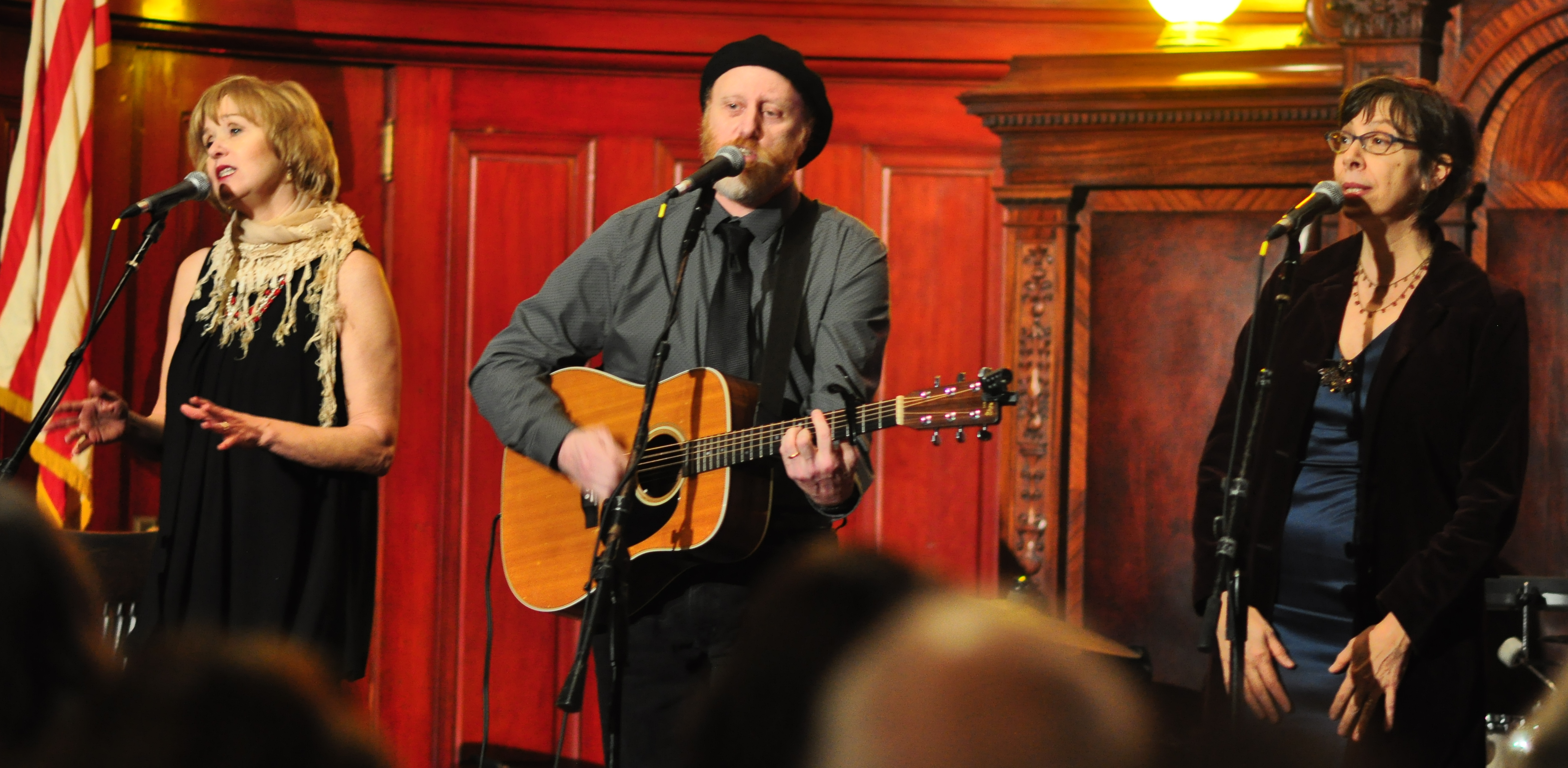
- Uncle Bonsai (2015)

Background information
- Origin: Seattle, Washington, U.S.
- Genres: Folk/Acoustic
- Years active: 1981–present
- Labels: Yellow Tail Records
- Website: unclebonsai.com

Uncle Bonsai is an American contemporary folk trio from Seattle, Washington. They formed in 1981, took a hiatus from 1989 to 1998, reformed for a few years, then took another hiatus until 2008, playing intermittently. Their earlier songs included "Suzy", "Charlie and Me", "Penis Envy", and "Boys Want Sex in the Morning", some of which occasionally resulted in Federal Communications Commission (FCC) problems when played on the radio, and twenty-odd songs recounting the life experiences of a character named Doug ("Doug's First Date", "Doug at His Mom's", "Doug's First Job", "Doug Engaged", "Doug Gets Married", etc.). Their more recent works, including "The Baby's Head", "The Grim Parade", "20th Century Man," and "Where's the Milk", focus on the passing of time, the passing of genes, and the passing of pets – the truth of everything seemingly buried somewhere under the family tree.

Uncle Bonsai has headlined at clubs and festivals throughout North America and opened for various artists, including Bonnie Raitt, TOTO, Suzanne Vega, Loudon Wainwright III, and the Bobs. The original members were Andrew Ratshin, Arni Adler, and Ashley O'Keeffe. In March 2007 they announced that they would be recording and performing more frequently, with O'Keeffe replaced by singer/songwriter (and Mel Cooleys member) Patrice O'Neill. Most of the satirical songs were written by Ratshin, but Adler revealed her own brand of absurdist wit in several songs, including fan favorites "Cheerleaders on Drugs" and "Don't Put It In Your Mouth." The band's songs continue to receive airplay on college radio and Dr. Demento.

Andrew Ratshin also performs and records solo as the Electric Bonsai Band ("It's not electric, it's not a band - it's Ratshin on acoustic guitar."), and as part of a sextet, the Mel Cooleys. His records are available on his own Yellow Tail Records label.

== Discography ==
- A Lonely Grain of Corn (1984; re-release 2001)
- Boys Want Sex in the Morning (1986)
- I Am Joe's Eyes (1990) [Electric Bonsai Band]
- The Inessential Uncle Bonsai (1992, recorded in 1985–1989)
- Myn Ynd Wymyn (1992, recorded in 1987)
- But I'm Happy Now (1993) [Electric Bonsai Band]
- Plain Brown Wrapper (1999)
- Sponge Boy (CD single) (1999)
- Doug (2000; recorded live on Aug. 4, 1998) [with Electric Bonsai Band and Mel Cooleys]
- Apology (2001)
- The Grim Parade (2010)
- The Family Feast: The Study of the Human Condition, First World Problems, and the Lasting Physiological and Psychological Effects of Eating Our Young (2017)
