= Stickfigure Records =

Stickfigure Records is an American record label founded by Gavin Frederick and based in Atlanta, Georgia. It was created in the winter of 1992 to cater to the underground scene of independent music.

== Stickfigure releases ==
- Airoes "my zipper got stuck" CD
- Blame Game "anthology" CD;
- Blame Game "Honey & Salt" CD
- The Blessed "again, with hate" 7-inch
- Camaro Crotch "triple picture disc discography"
- Coulier "cool, cooler, coulier!" CD
- Coulier "call and response" 7-inch
- Dawnbreed- Luxus 7-inch
- Death Of Marat - All Eyes Open CD
- Deerhunter Turn It Up Faggot LP/CD
- Electrosleep International "anthology volume 1-inch CD
- eNTERTAINME.nt "safe at one" 7-inch
- eNTERTAINME.nt - Gender
- Feeding Fingers- Wound in Wall
- Feeding Fingers- Baby Teeth
- Femme Fatality "One's Not Enough" CD
- Femme Fatality - Pretty Mess 7-inch
- Femme Fatality -"That's It, That's It" CD
- Graboids - Infinite Delay CD
- I Would Set Myself on Fire for You s/t CD
- I Would Set Myself on Fire for You- ...Believes In Patterns CD
- Me and him call it us "loss"
- Milemarker - Changing Caring Humans CD
- Milemarker - Futurisms LP/CD
- nerdkween Synergy CD
- One Hand Loves The Other "One Hand Loves The Other" CD
- One Hand Loves The Other "One Hand Loves The Remix" CD
- The Paper Chase and Xiu Xiu "cover nick cave" split 7-inch
- The Party of Helicopters - Abracadaver CD
- Thoroughbred "s/t" 7-inch
- Portrait s/t 7-inch
- Retconned- Simulant Skin Included CD
- Spiritworld "soul...sold it" 7-inch
- Snowden "black eyes" 7-inch
- Warning Light - Further On CD
- Warning Light - Wild Silver CD
- .you. "i am you" CD
