= Jazz of the City Atlanta portrait =

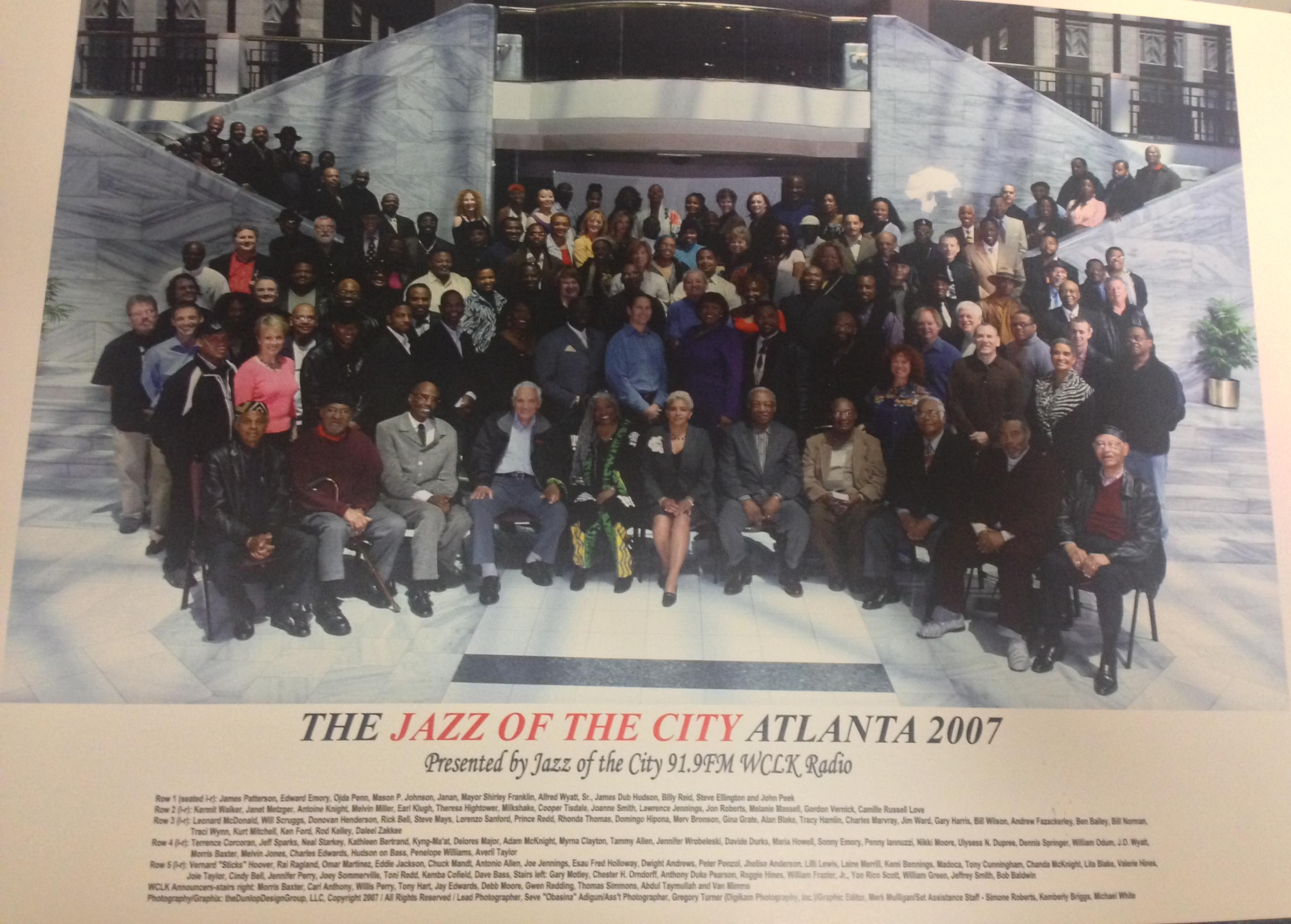
The Jazz of the City Atlanta 2007 is a historic, color portrait of over 100 jazz musicians surrounding Mayor Shirley Franklin taken at Atlanta City Hall.

The Jazz of the City Atlanta is a historic, color portrait of over 100 jazz musicians surrounding then-Mayor Shirley Franklin created in the Atlanta City Hall Atrium. Similar to the iconic, black and white, jazz portrait A Great Day in Harlem taken by Art Kane in 1958 — THE JAZZ OF THE CITY ATLANTA 2007 photograph marked a great day in Atlanta jazz history and the 30th anniversary of the Atlanta Jazz Festival.

On April 16, 2007, 162 photos were taken by Seve "Obasina" Adigun and Gregory Turner. WCLK 91.9 FM radio and the City of Atlanta collaborated to recreate Atlanta's own icon of Art Kane's 1958 classic black-and-white photo. One of the most famous musicians seen here is Averil Taylor, whose video of his performance of 'Flight of the Bumblebee' has received over 300,000 views.

The jazz portrait was presented by WCLK radio station of Clark Atlanta University (CAU) in Atlanta, Georgia.

== Participants ==
The photo features the following individuals:

Row 1 (seated left-to-right): James Patterson, Edward Emory, Ojeda Penn, Mason P. Johnson, Janan, Mayor Shirley Franklin, Alfred Wyatt, Sr., James Dub Hudson, Billy Reid, Steve Ellington and John Peek

Row 2 (l-r): Kermit Walker, Janet Metzger, Antoine Knight, Melvin Miller, Earl Klugh, Theresa Hightower, Milkshake, Cooper Tisdale, Joanne Smith, Lawrence Jennings, Jon Roberts, Melanie Massell, Gordon Vernick, Camille Russell Love

Row 3 (l-r): Leonard McDonald, Will Scruggs, Donovan Henderson, Rick Bell, Steve Mays, Lorenzo Sanford, Prince Redd, Rhonda Thomas, Domingo Hipona, Merv Bronson, Gina Grate, Alan Blake, Tracy Hamlin, Charles Marvray, Jim Ward, Gary Harris, Bill Wilson, Andrew Fazackerley, Ben Bailey, Bill Norman, Traci Wynn, Kurt Mitchell, Ken Ford, Rod Kelley, Daleel Zakkee

Row 4 (l-r): Terrence Corcoran, Jeff Sparks, Neal Starkey, Kathleen Bertrand, Kyng-Ma'at, Delores Major, Adam McKnight, Myrna Clayton, Tammy Allen, Jennifer Wrobeleski, Davide Durks, Maria Howell, Sonny Emory, Penny Iannuzzi, Nikki Moore, Ulysess N. Dupree, Dennis Springer, William Odum, J.O. Wyatt, Morris Baxter, Melvin Jones, Charles Edwards, Hudson on Bass, Penelope Williams, Averil Taylor

Row 5 (l-r): Vernard "Sticks" Hoover, Rai Ragland, Omar Martinez, Eddie Jackson, Chuck Mandt, Antonio Allen, Joe Jennings, Esau Fred Holloway, Dwight Andrews, Peter Ponzol, Jhelisa Anderson, Lilli Lewis, Laine Merrill, Kemi Bennings, Madoca, Tony Cunningham, Chanda McKnight, Lita Blake, Valerie Hines, Joie Taylor, Cindy Bell, Jennifer Perry, Joey Sommerville, Toni Redd, Kemba Cofield, Dave Bass, Stairs left: Gary Motley, Chester H. Orndorff, Anthony Duke Pearson, Reggie Hines, William Frazier, Jr., Yonrico Scott, William Green, Jeffrey Smith, Bob Baldwin

WCLK announcers (stairs right): Morris Baxter, Carl Anthony, Willis Perry, Tony Hart, Jay Edwards, Debb Moore, Gwen Redding, Thomas Simmons, Abdul Taymullah and Van Mimms
