= Atlanta record labels =

This is a list of notable record labels based in Atlanta, Georgia

- 1017 Brick Squad
- Brick Squad Monopoly
- Arista Records—Parent company of LaFace Records, which has set up a satellite office in Atlanta.
- BME Recordings—Record Label owned by Rapper Lil Jon
- Block Entertainment
- Daemon Records
- Corporate Thugz-Record Label owned by Rapper Young Jeezy
- Disturbing Tha Peace - Record Label owned by rapper Ludacris
- Dust-to-Digital - Roots and archival label
- Freebandz
- Edition Lilac—Early Music and Classical Record Label
- Grand Hustle Records-Record label owned by rapper T.I.
- Konvict Muzik
- LaFace Records
- LoveRenaissance
- Opium-Record label founded by rapper Playboi Carti
- Quality Control Music
- RBMG
- Reach Records-Record label owned by Rapper Lecrae
- Rob's House Records
- Shonuff Records
- So So Def Records
- This Is American Music—Southeastern Independent Label headquartered in Atlanta
