= Nerdkween =

American singer-songwriter

(nerdkween)*
- Origin: Anderson, Indiana
- Genres: Noise pop, ambient, lo-fi, folk, freak folk, experimental, New Weird America, pop, dream pop
- Instruments: Voice, electric and acoustic guitar, percussion, piano, cassette tape, radio, toys
- Years active: 2000 – present
- Labels: Stickfigure, Fieldhouse Recordings
- Website: Official site

Nerdkween (pronounced "nerd queen") is the stage name for the American singer/songwriter and composer Monica Arrington, who is known for lo-fi recordings and minimalist style of electric guitar playing with added electronic noises. She is also known for a wide range in vocal ability, from haunting and airy tones to gritty and country-like twangs. Her music is a part of the genres noise pop, lo-fi, slowcore or dream pop. Arrington started self-releasing cassette tape demos in 2000 starting with "i see things differently now". Then she put out other CD demos "the dark horse" and "Sketches at Eddie's Attic". Arrington's debut full-length album "Synergy" is distributed through Stickfigure Records in Atlanta, Georgia.

== Discography ==
- i see things differently now 2000 cassette tape
- the dark horse 2002 CD
- Sketches at Eddie's Attic 2004 CD
- Synergy 2008 CD Stickfigure Records

== Credits ==
- Vocals on "The Delores Lesion" CD 2004 from Metal band Lilitu
