= Raves (band) =

American 1980s power pop group

The Raves are a power pop band based in Atlanta, Georgia and were most active in the 1980s. Originally formed in 1971 and called Nod, the band consisted of three brothers (Chuck, John and Jim Yoakum) and Ken Kennedy. Unusual for that time in the Southern United States, they played original rock music in the vein of The Pretenders, Badfinger, Big Star, and other pop rock bands. In 1980 the group changed the name from Nod to The Raves. The Raves played throughout the South including Atlanta area nightclubs: 688 Club, The Agora Ballroom, The Bistro and many other venues through the mid-1980s. The Raves also had their own local public-access television program titled "Eh, Wot's This?", a mix of original comedy sketches and music video which aired from 1980 to 1982. The series won a Caber award in 1981. An LP titled The Color of Tears was released on their own label later that year. The group disbanded in 1983. A CD titled Past Perfect Tense that took tracks from the Color of Tears LP and newly recorded material from 1989 was released in 1992. A second CD, titled Inside Looking Out (a compilation of their Nod and Raves material from 1968 to 1983) was released in 2002.

2013: The Raves welcomed Dale Hall to play drums for the International Pop Overthrow. 2014: Chuck Yoakum performed a solo set for the International Pop Overthrow. The group began work on restoring some previously unheard tracks and video. 2015: The Raves performed at the 2015 International Pop Overthrow, showcasing some of their early songs from the 1970s when they were known as Nod, along with other Raves material. 2017/2018: Chuck Yoakum began work on a solo project called the Paisley Garden Project with Ken Kennedy on guitar, Dan Peterson on bass and Jeff Cochran on drums recording an album called "In A Perfect World". Feb. 2019: The Raves with Dale Hall on drums perform at the International Pop Overthrow. Summer 2019: A summer concert of Nod and Raves material is planned with Jim Yoakum on drums and additional musicians to fill out the more orchestrated songs.

== The Raves Gallery ==
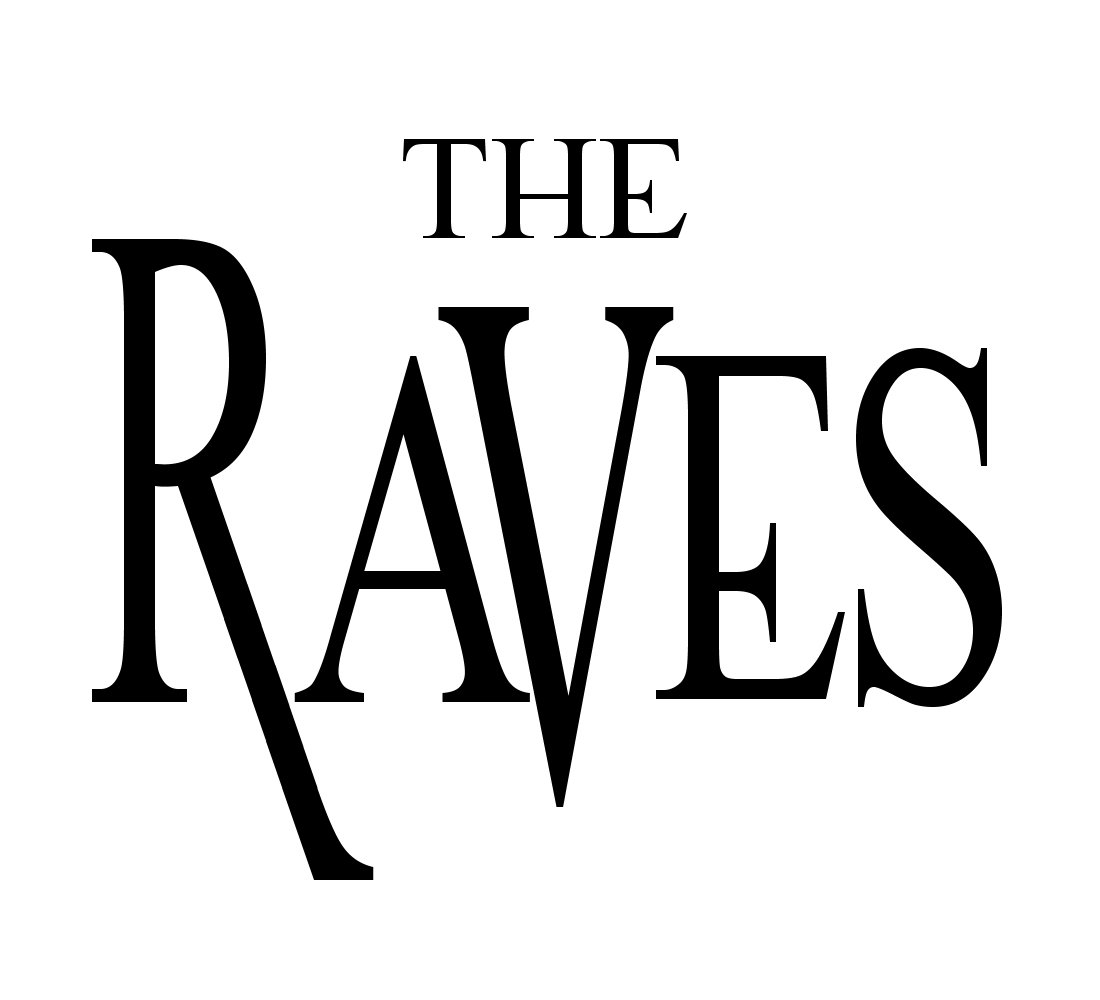

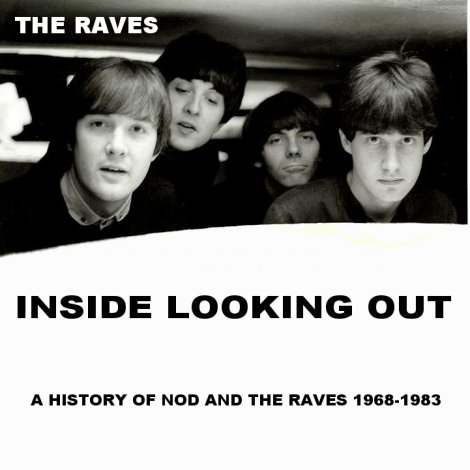

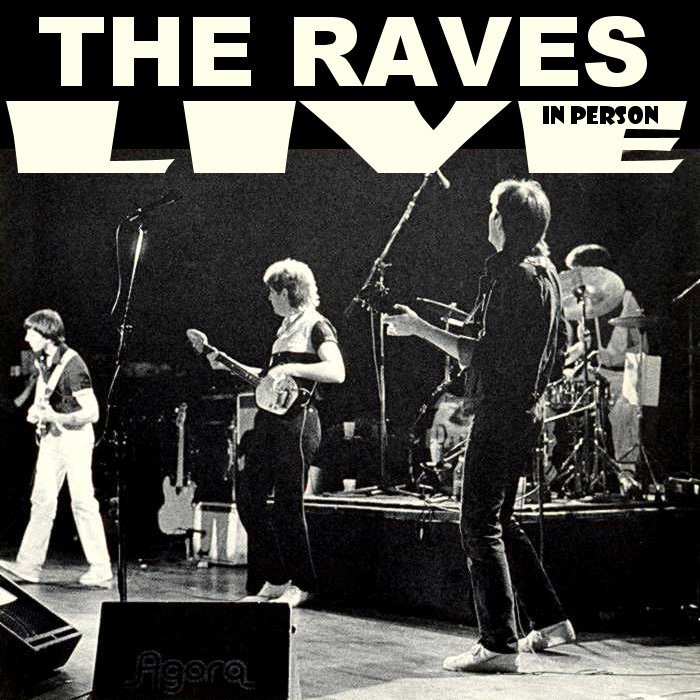

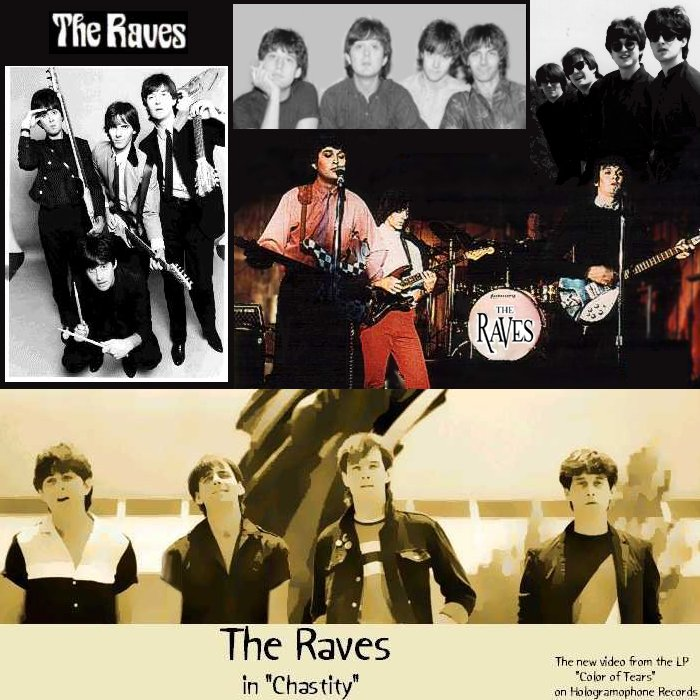

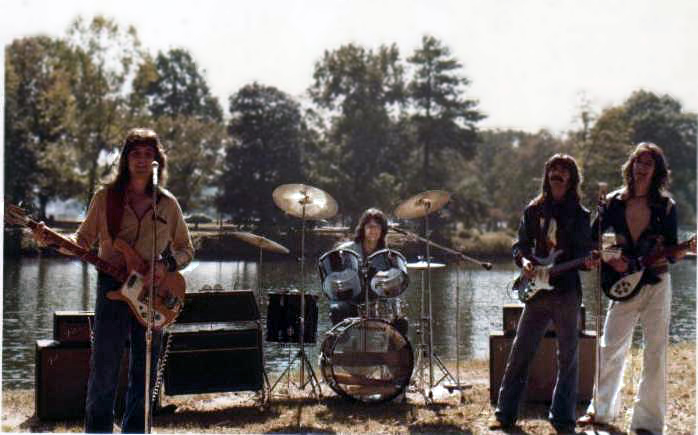

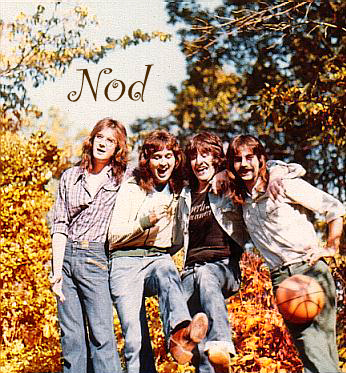
