= Vietnam (band) =

- Vietnam in 1981.

Background information
- Origin: Atlanta, Georgia, United States
- Genres: Post-punk, rock and roll, new wave
- Years active: 1980–present
- Labels: Scared Records
- Members: Stan Satin; David Dean; David Watkins; Laurie G-Force; Ken Schenck
- Website: www.myspace.com/vietnam80

Vietnam is a rock, post-punk and new wave band from Atlanta, Georgia on Scared Records. Vietnam first appeared at the dawn of a new decade—the 80's, and ushered in a fresh era of music to the Atlanta new wave scene. Embraced by the early 80's cavalcade of Athens bands such as R.E.M., Pylon, Method Actors, Love Tractor, etc., Vietnam wowed the patrons of the legendary 688 club, 40 Watt club, and the Agora Ballroom. Their first performance was opening for Public Image Ltd. in April 1980, and the next year they played the Noise Fest in New York, appearing on the ZG compilation release of the same name along with Sonic Youth, Glenn Branca, Y Pants and others. They released their first full-length album, Past Away, on Scared Records in 2004.

== Current members ==
- Stan Satin: lead vocals, saxophone, percussion
- David Dean: drums, backing vocals, moog synthesiser, steel drum, percussion
- David Watkins: drums, percussion
- Laurie G-Force: bass, backing vocals
- Ken Schenck: electric guitar

== Previous members ==
- Drew Davidson: electric guitar
- Tim Hunter: bass, drums, synthesizer
- Sue Garner: synthesizer, b.vocals, congas, steel drum
- Bruce Sehorne: bass
- Lee Self: bass, b.vocals
- John Stratton: percussion
- J.E. Garnett: bass, b.vocals
- Paul Lenz: drums
- Nicky Gianaris: bass
- Dana Downs: electric guitar, b.vocals, percussion
- Lenore Thompson: bass, b.vocals
- Randy Presley: drums
- Bryan Lilje: bass
- Jennifer Ericson: electric guitar
- John Stun: electric guitar

== Discography ==
- Noise Fest compilation, 1981
- Past Away (2004)
