= The Plague (American band) =

American hardcore punk band

- Origin: Cleveland, Ohio, United States
- Genres: Hardcore punk
- Years active: 1982–1990
- Past members: Bob Sablack; Duke Snyder; John "Korrosion" Korosec; Mike Duncan; Don Piccarillo; Bill DeGidio

The Plague was an American hardcore punk band formed in Cleveland, Ohio, United States, by Bob Sablack. They were part of the second wave of punk rock music and toured extensively throughout the United States and Europe, recording several EP's.

== History ==
The Plague started out in October 1982 as a three-person band. Bob Sablack recruited his cousin John Korosec of his previous band The Defnics on drums and Duke Snyder, the younger brother of his best friend who lived down the street, on bass, with himself on guitar and vocals. Influenced by bands such as Discharge and The Stooges, the three recorded an eight-song demo almost immediately.

They played nearly every venue in Cleveland and Kent, and went through several vocalists before recruiting Mike Duncan of Agitated for vocals in 1985. That same year, they attempted to record their masterpiece, but showed up to the studio too drunk to play and did not record anything else for a while. Finally, in 1987, after much insistence from The Pagans' Mike Metoff, the Plague hit the studios, recording "Just Say No". The record got a glowing three-sentence review in Maximumrocknroll that would send them on their way to a European tour.

Swedish record producer Stefan Wicklander heard the single and wanted to sign The Plague. They accepted, and Wicklander produced a split LP called Distortion Head with Swedish band Rosvette (Ass Sweat), a tour promotion single "Unresting Place" and The Plague's full LP Chain Sawng Massacre.

== European tour ==
The band proceeded to tour Europe, where they had the biggest following outside of the Cleveland area. They were the first band from Cleveland's second wave of punk to tour Europe, The Dead Boys and Pere Ubu having toured there a decade earlier during the first wave of punk. The Plague's song "Nazi Submarine" was always a crowd pleaser. But when the band toured Germany, they decided to drop it from their set list, fearing it might offend audiences. When they got there, however, the crowds screamed for "Nazi Submarine" everywhere they went.

== Demise ==
The Plague recorded one final session in 1989 before calling it quits. Nearly thirty years later, all of their vinyl recordings as well as some previously unreleased recordings were released in a two-volume set entitled Thumper, which is also downloadable.

== Discography ==
- "Just Say No"
- Distortion Head
- Unresting Place
- Chain Sawng Massacre
- Thumper, Volume 1
- Thumper, Volume 2
