= Uncle Green =

American band

Formed in Basking Ridge, New Jersey in 1980, the band Uncle Green consisted of Matt Brown (guitar and vocals), Jeff Jensen (guitar, vocals), Bill Decker (bass and keyboards), Peter McDade (drums), and Danny Giordano (tambourine and vocals). Brown and Jensen were the principal songwriters and vocalists for the group.

== History ==
=== Early years ===
After relocating to Atlanta, the band recorded a single, "Holes" b/w "Heaven", in 1986, and two independent records, Get It Together and 15 Dryden, for New Vision Records in 1987 and 1988. Creative differences led Giordano to leave Atlanta for New York after the first LP, where he formed the band Humbolts. Uncle Green soon met an ascendant Brendan O'Brien, near the beginning of his producing career, with whom they recorded the albums You and What An Experiment His Head Was for DB Records. After establishing themselves as a well-known regional college-rock band, they signed a contract with Atlantic Records in 1992 and recorded Book of Bad Thoughts. Like all of their efforts, the album was lauded by critics, but establishing commercial viability proved more difficult. Subsequent tours playing with The Reivers, Semisonic, The Black Crowes, Napalm Sunday, Matthew Sweet, They Might Be Giants, Robyn Hitchcock and Ben Folds Five helped increased their visibility.

In 1994, the band took part in the Indigo Girls project Jesus Christ Superstar: A Resurrection and appear on the studio cast album. In 1995 part of a solo Matt Brown set recorded at Eddie's Attic in Decatur, Georgia, was included on the album Solo, Volume I, released by the independent label Sister Ruby. The album included original songs that do not appear on any of the group's albums, as well as a cover of Big Star's "Nighttime". The same year, Uncle Green contributed a version of "Ballad of a Thin Man" to A Tribute to Bob Dylan, Vol. 2, also on the Sister Ruby label.

=== Renaming ===
Disappointed with their limited success, the band renamed themselves 3 lb. Thrill (the weight of the human brain) and recorded the harder-edged Vulture for O'Brien's new label, 57 Records, a subsidiary of Sony 550 and Epic. This spawned a minor radio hit, "Diana", which examined the uncomfortable subject of child molestation and suffered commercially as a result. A video was recorded for the single "Something Will Come", directed by Peter Christopherson. 3 lb. Thrill's second album, Rycopa, was recorded in 1997 with engineer Caram Costanzo but remained unavailable until December 2011, when fans supported a Kickstarter fundraising campaign for its release after the missing master tapes were found and acquired from Sony. They also used the opportunity to release a collection of outtakes called Scrapple. A very prolific band, numerous other compilations of unreleased recordings circulate among fans.

=== Solo projects ===
Matt Brown's solo album Morning After Medicine Show, recorded with producer Rick Neigher, drummers Pete Thomas and Dan McCarroll, and keyboardist Rami Jaffee, was recorded in 1999 and also saw limited release in 2011. Several other unreleased solo projects circulate. Brown toured as a musician for Brad in 1997, and produced the album Eleven Emergency Lessons for indie-rock band Amphibian Skin, headed by songwriter Michael Wescott, in 2003. Jensen and McDade also perform on the record. McDade's drums can also be heard on Atlanta musician Paul Melançon's album, Camera Obscura, released by Daemon Records in 2002. In 2014 Brown produced a record by Nancy Gardos called The Grand View.

=== Reunions ===
In 2005 and in 2006, as 3 lb. Thrill and Uncle Green respectively, the band reunited for special performances at Smith's Olde Bar in Atlanta and Eddie's Attic in Decatur, Georgia. In 2009, Brown played a rare solo set, opening for Jon Auer at Eddie's Attic. McDade played percussion and Jensen provided occasional backing vocals. In February 2012, performing simultaneously as both Uncle Green and 3 lb. Thrill, the band came together for a show at Smith's Olde Bar to celebrate the release of Rycopa.

In April 2012, Matt Brown created the Facebook Theme Music Group, which quickly grew from a handful of musicians to over 800 members by its one-year anniversary in April 2013. Members include Jeff Jensen and Pete McDade of Uncle Green as well as professional and amateur musicians from the United States, Europe, and Australia.

== Discography ==
=== Uncle Green ===
- "Holes" b/w "Heaven" (Twilight Records, 1986)
- Get it Together (New Vision, 1987)
- 15 Dryden (New Vision, 1988)
- You (DB Records, 1989)
- What an Experiment His Head Was (DB Records, 1991)
- Book of Bad Thoughts (Atlantic Records, 1992)
- "Ballad of a Thin Man" (on A Tribute to Bob Dylan, Vol. 2, Sister Ruby, 1995)

=== 3 Lb. Thrill ===
- Vulture (Sony/57 Records, 1995)

=== Uncle Green / 3 lb. Thrill ===
- Rycopa (1997, UG Records 2011)
- Scrapple (UG Records, 2011)

=== Matt Brown ===
- Solo, Volume I (Sister Ruby, 1995)
- Potshots in the Dark (self-released cassette, 1998)
- Jigsaw Matinee (self-released cassette, 1999)
- Future Perfect Future (2002, unreleased)
- The Morning After Medicine Show (2000, Uncle Green 2011)

=== as featured musicians ===
- Jesus Christ Superstar: A Resurrection (cast album, Daemon Records, 1994)
- Camera Obscura - Paul Melançon (Daemon Records, 2002)
- Eleven Emergency Lessons - Amphibian Skin (Cattle Clatter, 2003)
