= The Method Actors =

American post-punk/new wave band

- Origin: Athens, Georgia, U.S.
- Genres: Post-punk, new wave
- Years active: 1979–1982
- Labels: Armegeddon, db recs, Press

The Method Actors were an American post-punk/new wave musical group from Athens, Georgia, United States, founded by Vic Varney and David Gamble in 1979 while at the University of Georgia.

== Discography ==
=== Singles and EPs ===
- This Is It 7" ep: "The Method" / "Can't Act" / "Bleeding" (AS006 - Armageddon Records, 1980)
- Rhythms of You 10" ep: "Distortion" / "Privilege"/ "Dancing Underneath" / "No Condition" / "She" / "You" / "My Time" (AEP12005 - Armageddon Records, 1981)
- Dancing Underneath 12" EP (DB, 1981)
- "Rang-a-Tang" / "Big Red Brain" 7" (P1004 - Press Records, 1981)
- "Round World" / "E-Y-E" 7" single (AS 011 - Armageddon Records, 1981)
- Commotion (dance mix) / Bleeding 12" dance single (Press P2004, 1981)
- Live in a Room! EP (Press Records, 1982)

=== Albums ===
- Little Figures 2 x LP (MAD1 - Armageddon Records, 1981)
- Little Figures 1 x LP (Press Records, 1982)
- Luxury LP (Press Records, 1983)
- Luxury 2 x LP (P 4004 - Press Records, 1985)
- This Is Still It CD (Acute Records, 2010)

== Members ==
- Vic Varney: vocals, guitar, bass
- David Gamble: drums, vocals
- Michael Richmond: guitar, bass, backing vocals
- Robert Schmid: drums
- Stan Satin: saxophone, percussion, vocals

== See also ==
- Music of Athens, Georgia
