= Maude Andrews Ohl =

American journalist (1862–1943)

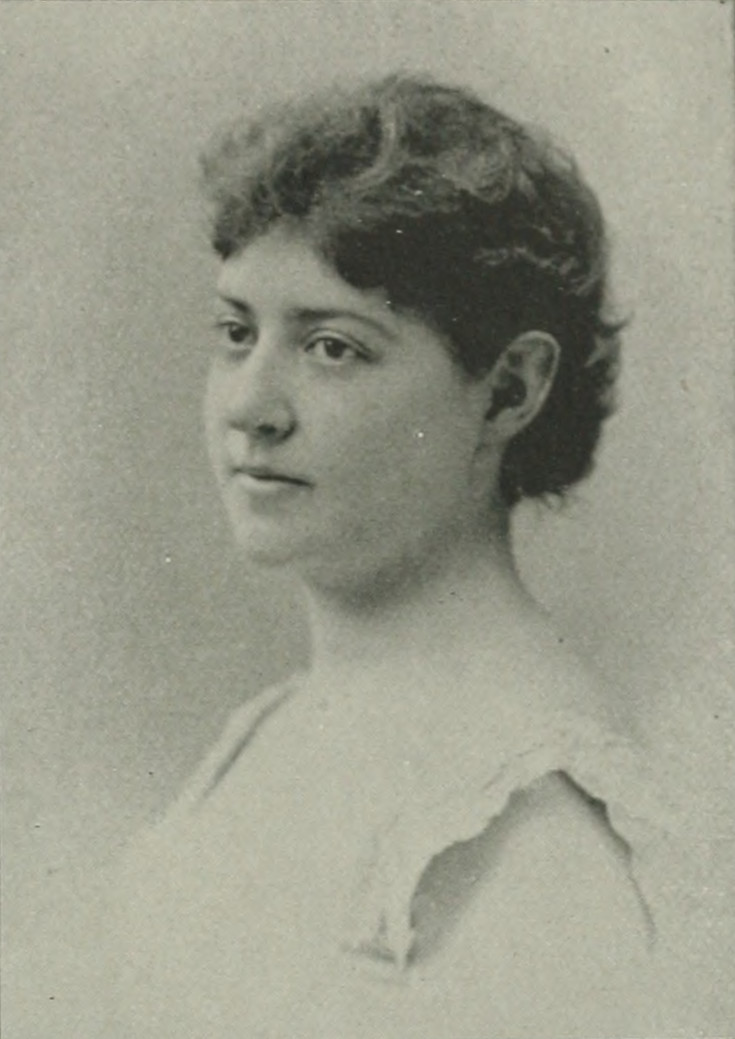
- Portrait from A Woman of the Century
- Born: Maude Annulet Andrews; December 29, 1862; Taliaferro County, Georgia, U.S.
- Died: January 7, 1943 (aged 80); Bronxville, New York, U.S.
- Occupations: journalist; poet; novelist
- Spouse: Josiah Kingsley Ohl (m. 1889; died 1920)
- Children: 1
- Relatives: Fanny Andrews (cousin); Eliza A. Bowen (cousin); Robert Toombs
- Writing career
- Pen name: Annulet Andrews
- Genre: Southern United States literature

Maude Andrews Ohl (December 29, 1862 – January 7, 1943), known by her pen name Annulet Andrews, was an American journalist, poet, and novelist. She was The Atlanta Constitution's (later The Atlanta Journal-Constitution) first woman reporter. Her published works include a biography about James Abbott McNeill Whistler, Cousin Butterfly: Being Some Memories of Whistler (1904); the novels The Wife of Narcissus (1908), and Melissa Starke (1935); as well as poetry collection Songs of Day and Night.

== Early life and education ==
Maude Annulet Andrews was born in Taliaferro County, Georgia, December 29, 1862, in the home of her great-grandfather, Joshua Morgan. In infancy, she went with her parents to Washington, Georgia, where she spent the years of her childhood in the home of her grandfather, Judge Garnett Andrews, a jurist in the state. It was a sprawling estate with old orchards and terraced gardens, surrounded by a forest of giant trees. Ohl's father was Dr. Henry Andrews. Her cousins included Fanny Andrews, a popular novelist, and Eliza A. Bowen, the astronomer. Ohl was also related to General Robert Toombs.

Ohl received a liberal education and early showed her bent towards literature.

While still a child, Ohl began writing poetry, much of which was printed.

== Career ==
She became a contributor to the comic papers and magazines. In 1889, as a result of some clever letters sent by her from New York City to The Atlanta Constitution, she developed a reputation as a promising young writer. Her work included society sketches, art and dramatic criticism, and essays on social subjects, reforms, and public charities.

At an early age, she met Josiah Kingsley Ohl (1863-1920) at the Constitution, and by the time they married, in 1889, he was city editor and she was society editor. She continued using her maiden name, "Maude Andrews", while at the Constitution.

Ohl published poems in the Magazine of Poetry and in various journals. Her poems were widely copied. She also wrote for Puck, Cosmopolitan, and for Harper's Weekly. Under the pen name, "Annulet Andrews", she was the author of an autobiographical novel, Melissa Starke, published shortly before her 73rd birthday, and The Wife of Narcissus, a novel which ran serially in The Saturday Evening Post. As a critic, she was outspoken and appreciative. She discussed art and the drama with ability, and her society sketches were equally characterized by novelty and vigorous treatment. She wrote on all social matters, reforms, public charities, entertainments, with excellence.

Ohl was one of the Lady Managers of the Cotton States and International Exposition (1896). She served as president of the press committee, and provided services for the Woman's Department.

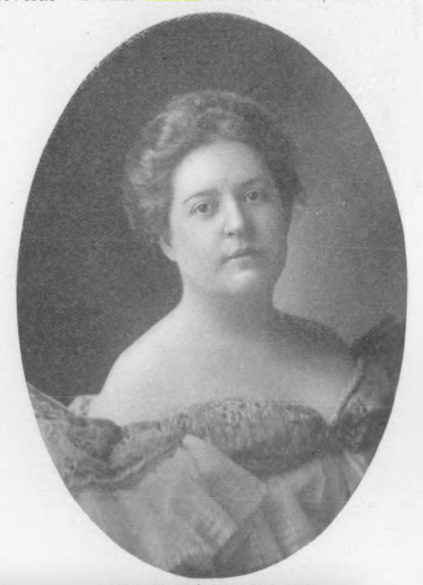
1906

Ohl accompanied her husband to China when the latter was sent to the Orient as the Far Eastern Correspondent for the New York Herald. They returned to the U.S. in the early 1900s, when her Josiah was named editor of the Herald, and she then wrote a number of articles on her life in China.

While in Paris, and later in London, she contributed to various foreign periodicals. By 1906, she was residing in New York, contributing to syndicates and magazines, among them Lippincott's and Everybody's, while continuing to contribute weekly articles for the Constitution.

In 1891, along with Lollie Belle Wylie and others, she co-founded the Georgia Women's Press Club.

== Personal life ==
The couple had one daughter, Joan, and made their home in Atlanta, Georgia. Following a short illness, Ohl died at her home in the Gramatan Hotel, Bronxville, New York, January 7, 1943.

== Selected works ==
- Cousin Butterfly: Being Some Memories of Whistler (1904)
- The Wife of Narcissus (1908)
- Melissa Starke (1935)
- Songs of Day and Night
