= Sarah Bailey =

Sarah or Sara Bailey may refer to:

- Sarah Lord Bailey (1856–1922), British-born American elocutionist and teacher
- Sarah Randolph Bailey (1885–1972), American educator and Girl Scout pioneer
- Sarah Storey (born 1977), née Bailey, British cyclist and swimmer
- Sarah Thomas (American football official) (born 1973), née Bailey
- Sara Bailey (figure skater), American figure skater
- Sara Bailey (boxer) (born 1994), Sierra Leonean-Canadian boxer
