= Rebecca Taylor =

Rebecca Taylor may refer to:

- Rebecca Taylor (fashion designer) (born 1969)
- Rebecca Taylor (politician) (born 1975)
- Self Esteem (musician) (Rebecca Lucy Taylor, born 1986)
- Rebecca Stiles Taylor (1879–1958), American journalist, social worker, and educator
- Riva Taylor (Rebecca Jane Grosvenor Taylor, born 1988)
