= Georgia Women of Achievement =

Award

The Georgia Women of Achievement (GWA) recognizes women natives or residents of the U.S. state of Georgia for their significant achievements or statewide contributions. The concept was first proposed by Rosalynn Carter in 1988. The first induction was in 1992 at Wesleyan College, and has continued annually. The induction ceremonies are held each year during March, designated as Women's History Month. The organization consists of a Board of Trustees and a Board of Selections. Nominees must have been dead no less than ten years. Georgians, or those associated with Georgia, are selected based on the individual's impact on society. Nominations are proposed through documentation and an online nomination form, and must be submitted prior to October of any given year. GWA has traveling exhibits and speakers available upon request.

== Inductees ==
Georgia Women of Achievement
Name	Image	Birth–Death	Year	Area of achievement	Ref(s)
Jessye Norman		(1945–2019)	2025	Opera singer, philanthropist	
Alma Thomas		(1891–1978)	2025	Painter, educator	
Beatrice Hirsch Haas		(1905–1997)	2024	Fundraising Consultant	
Adella Hunt Logan		(1863–1915)	2024	African American teacher and suffragist	
Valeria Murphey		(1926–1990)	2024	Artist, philanthropist	
Elizabeth "Bessie" Tift		(1860–1936)	2024	Philanthropist	
Phyllis Jenkins Barrow		(1920–2009)	2023	WWII Women's Army Corps, Executive Officer of the European Order of Battle Branch in Army Intelligence at the Pentagon, Chairwoman Athens Salvation Army Advisory Board	
Alice Coachman		(1923–2014)	2023	First black woman to win an Olympic gold medal	
Luck Flanders Gambrell		(1930–2015)	2023	Philanthropist	
Dorothy Rogers Tilly		(1883–1970)	2023	American civil rights activist	
Lizzie Lurline Collier		(1893–1986)	2022	Educator, civil servant	
Josephine Fields Sanders		(1895–1975)	2022	Musician, civic leader	
Hedwig "Hedy" Grace West		(1938–2005)	2022	Musician	
Josephine Wilkins		(1893–1977)	2022	Social activist, president of the Georgia State League of Women Voters	
Ruby Maude Anderson		(1893–1977)	2021	Educator	
Mary Givens Bryan		(1910–1964)	2021	Archivist	
Laura Pope Forester		(1873–1953)	2021	Folk artist	
Allie Murray Smith		(1905–2000)	2021	International ambassador; mother of Rosalynn Carter	
Clarice Cross Bagwell		(1914–2001)	2020	Educator	
Katharine DuPre Lumpkin		(1897–1988)	2020	Author and educator	
Juanita Marsh		(1926–2013)	2020	One of the first women judges in Georgia	
Jean Elizabeth Geiger Wright		(1924–2002)	2020	Land conservation and environmentalism	
Leila Alice Daughtry Denmark		(1898–2012)	2019	Pioneering pediatrician, supercentenarian	
Mary Dorothy Lyndon		(1877–1924)	2019	First female graduate from the University of Georgia in 1914	
Ludie Clay Andrews		(1875–1969)	2018	First African-American registered nurse in Georgia. Founder of the Grady Municipal Training School of Colored Nurses	
Susie Baker King Taylor		(1848–1912)	2018	Nurse and educator, first African-American Army nurse, wrote and self-published a memoir of her Civil War experiences.	
Mamie George S. Williams		(1872–1951)	2018	First African-American woman on the National Committee of the Republican Party. First woman to speak from the floor at the National Republican Convention.	
Carolyn McKenzie Carter		(1919–2010)	2017	First woman photojournalist for the Atlanta Journal-Constitution	
Clermont Huger Lee		(1914–2006)	2017	One of Georgia's first female landscape architects	
Lucile Nix		(1903–1968)	2017	First library head for the state of Georgia	
Sarah Harper Heard		(1853–1919)	2016	Founder of a traveling library system	
Ellamae Ellis League		(1899–1991)	2016	Architect	
Katie Hall Underwood		(1884–1977)	2016	Midwife	
Allie Carroll Hart		(1913–2003)	2015	Worked to preserve government records and photographs; established the Georgia Archives Institute for professional development; helped create the Southeast Archives and Records Conference; Faithful Service Award 1971 from Gov. Jimmy Carter, Outstanding Achievement Award from the Georgia Trust in 1997 and 2000, Brenau University Alumni Hall of Fame 2002	
Frances Freeborn Pauley		(1905–2003)	2015	League of Women Voters; President of the DeKalb League; Georgia League President; Executive Director of the Georgia Council on Human Relations; activist with the Office of Civil Rights who worked to implement the Civil Rights Act of 1964	
Nell Kendall Hodgson Woodruff		(1892–1968)	2015	American Red Cross; volunteer; first female member of the Emory Hospital Administration Committee; Eisenhower appointee to attend the World Health Organization in Geneva, Switzerland; created the Nell Hodgson Woodruff School of Nursing	
Rebecca Stiles Taylor		(1879–1958)	2014	First president of the Savannah chapter of the National Association of Colored Women	
Ella Gertrude Clanton Thomas		(1834–1907)	2014	Memoirist	
Bazoline Estelle Usher		(1885–1992)	2014	Atlanta's first Supervisor of Negro Schools	
Henrietta Stanley Dull		(1863–1964)	2013	Caterer, journalist, author (as S. R. Dull) of Southern Cooking	
Mary Gregory Jewett		(1908–1976)	2013	Founder and first President of the Georgia Trust for Historic Preservation	
Lollie Belle Moore Wylie		(1858–1923)	2013	Writer	
Sarah Randolph Bailey		(1885–1972)	2012	Educator who organized the YWCA-sponsored Girl Reserves for African-American girls	
Ethel Harpst		(1883–1967)	2012	Founder of the Ethel Harpst Home for children	
Beulah Rucker Oliver		(1888–1963)	2012	Educator	
Lillian Gordy Carter		(1898–1983)	2011	Mother of President Jimmy Carter; Peace Corps worker; nurse; businesswoman	
Mary Francis Hill Coley		(1900–1966)	2011	Midwife, subject of All My Babies	
May duBignon Stiles Howard		(1894–1983)	2011	Health care	
Mary Ann Lipscomb		(1848–1918)	2010	Educator	
Celestine Sibley		(1914–1999)	2010	Journalist	
Madrid Williams		(1911–1993)	2010	First female president of the National Association of Bar Executives	
Caroline Pafford Miller		(1903–1992)	2009	Won the Pulitzer Prize in 1934 for her first novel, Lamb in His Bosom, the first Georgian to win the Pulitzer for Fiction.	
Harriet Powers		(1837–1910)	2009	Quilt maker, creator of the Bible Quilt now in the possession of the National Museum of American History	
Jane Hurt Yarn		(1924–1995)	2009	Environmentalist, conservationist	
Elfrida De Renne Barrow		(1884–1970)	2008	Author, poet	
Amilee Chastain Graves		(1910–1983)	2008	Publisher; first woman to hold elected office in Habersham County	
Susan Dowdell Myrick		(1893–1978)	2008	Journalist, technical advisor for Gone with the Wind movie	
Margaret O. Bynum		(1921–1982)	2007	Educator	
Edith Lenora Foster		(1906–1996)	2007	Librarian, writer, historian	
Helen Douglas Mankin		(1894–1956)	2007	First woman elected to the United States Congress from Georgia	
Sara Branham Matthews		(1888–1962)	2007	Scientist who discovered a treatment for spinal meningitis	
Eliza Frances (Fanny) Andrews		(1840–1931)	2006	Botanist	
Grace Towns Hamilton		(1907–1992)	2006	First African-American woman elected to the Georgia General Assembly	
Sarah Porter Hillhouse		(1763–1831)	2006	First woman editor and printer in Georgia	
Alice Woodby McKane		(1865–1948)	2005	First female doctor in Savannah	
Nina Anderson Pape		(1869–1944)	2005	Educator	
Jeannette Pickering Rankin		(1880–1973)	2005	First woman elected to the United States House of Representatives	
Mathilda Beasley		(1832–1903)	2004	Former slave, Georgia's first African-American Catholic nun	
Louise Frederick Hays		(1881–1951)	2004	Historian, director Georgia Department of Archives and History	
Helen Dortch Longstreet		(1863–1962)	2004	Social activist	
Sarah McLendon Murphy		(1892–1954)	2004	Children's activist	
Emily Barnelia Woodward		(1885–1970)	2004	Journalist	
Madeleine Kiker Anthony		(1903–1989)	2003	Historic preservationist who helped save the old courthouse in Dahlonega, Georgia, now the Dahlonega Gold Museum Historic Site	
Helena Maud Brown Cobb		(1869–1922)	2003	Missionary, educator	
Julia Lester Dillon		(1871–1959)	2003	Landscape architect	
Leila Ross Wilburn		(1885–1967)	2003	Georgia's first registered female architect	
Wessie Gertrude Connell		(1915–1987)	2002	Librarian	
Lula Dobbs McEachern		(1874–1949)	2002	Educator, missionary, philanthropist	
Alice Harrell Strickland		(1859–1947)	2002	Georgia's first woman mayor	
Julia L. Coleman		(1889–1973)	2001	Educator	
Catherine Evans Whitener		(1880–1964)	2001	Revived the textile art of tufting into a profitable business	
Sallie Ellis Davis		(1877–1950)	2000	Educator	
Laura Askew Haygood		(1845–1900)	2000	Educator, missionary	
Ellen Louise Axson Wilson		(1860–1914)	2000	First Lady of the United States, first wife of President Woodrow Wilson	
Moina Belle Michael		(1869–1944)	1999	Originated the idea of using poppies to remember the war dead; honored with a United States postage stamp in 1948	
Lillian Eugenia Smith		(1897–1966)	1999	Author of Strange Fruit, a 1944 novel about interracial love	
Lettie Pate Evans		(1872–1953)	1998	Philanthropist, on board of directors of the Coca-Cola Bottling Co.	
Julia Collier Harris		(1885–1967)	1998	Journalist, civic leader, editor	
Rhoda Kaufman		(1888–1956)	1998	Social activist	
Carrie Steele Logan		(1829–1900)	1998	Founded Carrie Steele Orphans' Home	
Rebecca Latimer Felton		(1835–1930)	1997	First woman to serve in the United States Senate; women's rights advocate	
Mary Ann Harris Gay		(1829–1918)	1997	Author	
Nancy Morgan Hart		(1735–1830)	1997	Namesake of Hart County; frontier woman, American patriot, spy for the colonial army during the American War of Independence	
Lucy Barrow McIntire		(1886–1975)	1997	Civic activist	
Susan Cobb Milton Atkinson		(1860–1942)	1996	First Lady of Georgia, wife of Governor William Yates Atkinson; proponent of a state-supported college for women	
Nellie Peters Black		(1851–1919)	1996	Women's issues organizer and activist	
Ellen Smith Craft		(1826–1891)	1996	Escaped slave, educator	
Corra Mae White Harris		(1869–1935)	1996	Author	
Lugenia Burns Hope		(1871–1947)	1996	Social reformer	
Selena Sloan Butler		(1872–1964)	1995	Founder of first African-American PTA	
Anna Colquitt Hunter		(1892–1985)	1995	Historic preservationist	
Hazel Jane Raines		(1916–1956)	1995	First woman in Georgia to earn a pilot's license (private license, and commercial license with Eastern Air Lines), stunt pilot, Lieutenant of Women Airforce Service Pilots during World War II, flew with the (British) Air Transport Auxiliary, trained Brazilian air students, recalled into active duty to fly in the Korean War, inducted into Georgia Aviation Hall of Fame	
Julia Flisch		(1861–1941)	1994	Journalist, women's rights advocate, educator	
Carson McCullers		(1917–1967)	1994	Author	
Margaret Mitchell		(1900–1949)	1994	Author of Gone with the Wind	
Ruth Hartley Mosley		(1886–1975)	1994	Philanthropist	
Emily Harvie Thomas Tubman		(1794–1885)	1994	Founder of the first public high school for girls in Augusta	
Dicksie Bradley Bandy		(1890–1971)	1993	Philanthropist, businesswoman, campaigned to restore the historic Cherokee Chief Vann House Historic Site	
Mary Musgrove Bosomworth		(1700–1765)	1993	Creek Indian woman who served as an interpreter for James Oglethorpe	
Cassandra Pickett Durham		(1824–1885)	1993	First woman in Georgia to earn a doctor of medicine degree	
Viola Ross Napier		(1881–1962)	1993	First woman member Georgia House of Representatives, first woman lawyer to argue before Georgia Supreme Court	
Gertrude Pridgett "Ma" Rainey		(1886–1939)	1993	Blues singer	
Martha McChesney Berry		(1866–1942)	1992	Founder of Berry College	
Lucy Craft Laney		(1854–1933)	1992	Educator, hospital administrator	
Juliette Gordon Low		(1860–1927)	1992	Founder of Girl Scouts of the USA	
Flannery O'Connor		(1925–1964)	1992	Author	

== Further information ==
- Mary Francis Hill Coley (2007). All My Babies : A Midwife's Own Story (DVD). Image Entertainment. OCLC 141251448.
- Craft, Ellen; Craft, William (2012). Running a Thousand Miles for Freedom. Lanham, MD: Start Publishing LLC. ISBN 978-1-62558-532-5.
- Hawkins, Regina Trice (1996). Hazel Jane Raines, Pioneer Lady of Flight. Mercer University Press. ISBN 978-0-86554-532-8.
- Myrick, Susan; Harwell, Richard Barksdale (1982). White Columns in Hollywood: Reports from the Gone With the Wind Sets. Mercer University Press. ISBN 978-0-86554-044-6.
- Rouse, Jacqueline Anne (1989). Lugenia Burns Hope, Black Southern Reformer. University of Georgia Press. ISBN 978-0-8203-1082-4.
- Spritzer, Lorraine Nelson (1982). The Belle of Ashby Street: Helen Douglas Mankin and Georgia Politics. University of Georgia Press. ISBN 978-0-8203-3254-3.
- Spritzer, Lorraine Nelson; Bergmark, Jean B (1997). Grace Towns Hamilton and the Politics of Southern Change. University of Georgia Press. ISBN 978-0-8203-1889-9.
