= Tubman =

Tubman may refer to:

- Bob Tubman, Australian rugby league footballer
- Emily Harvie Thomas Tubman, American philanthropist
- Harriet Tubman, African American abolitionist and political activist
- William Tubman, President of Liberia
- Winston Tubman, Liberian politician

in law

- Tubman, a senior barrister of the historic Exchequer of pleas of England and Wales.
