= Julia Lester Dillon =

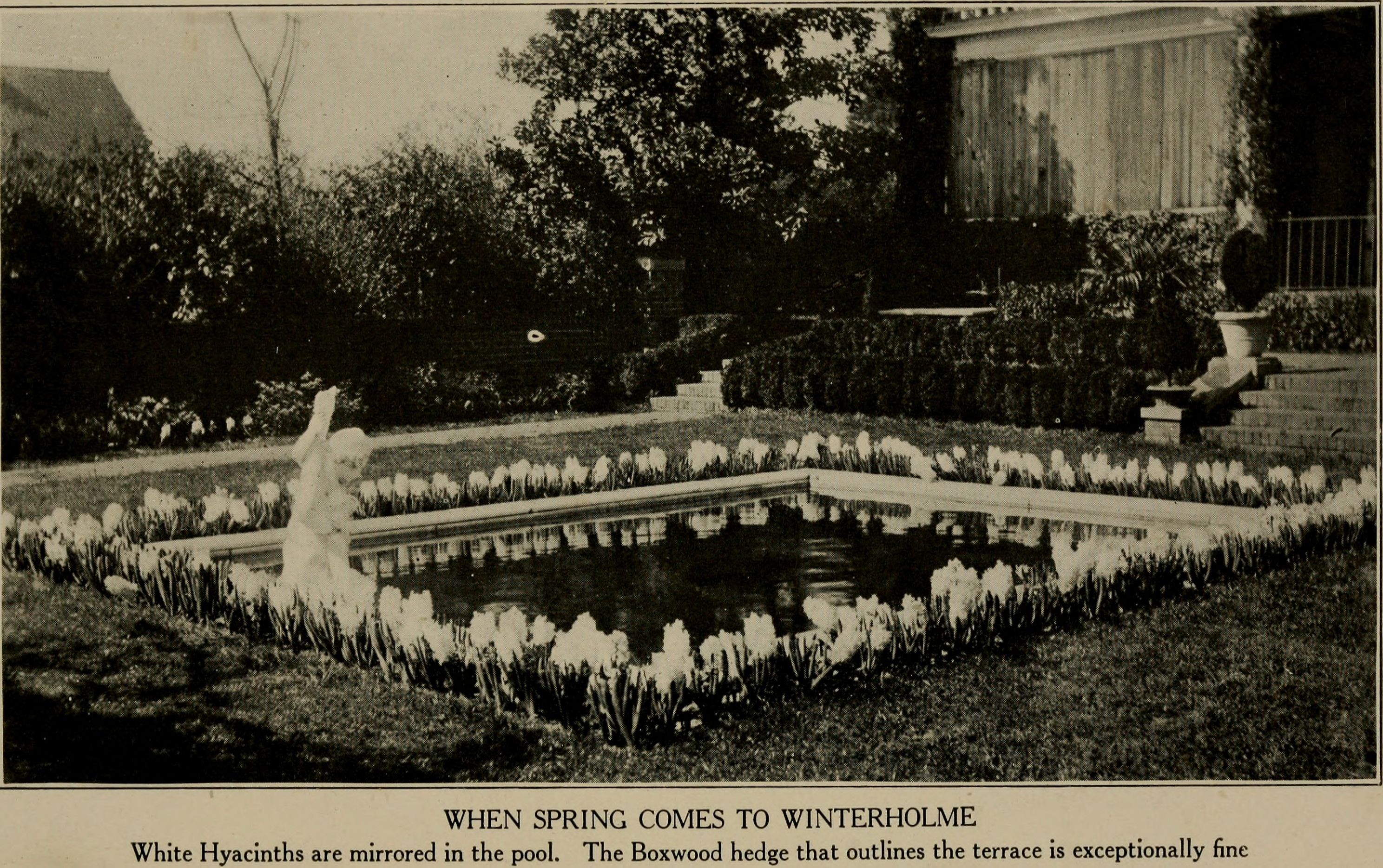
- Landscaping by Julia Dillon, white hyacinths around a reflecting pool.
- Born: March 9, 1871; Warren County, Georgia
- Died: March 24, 1959 (aged 88); Augusta, Georgia
- Occupations: teacher, landscape architect, gardening columnist
- Years active: 1890-1954
- Known for: Southern gardening

Julia Lester Dillon (1871–1959) was an American teacher from Georgia, who because of the death of her husband and her hearing loss, trained in landscape architecture. She was one of the first women to write extensively about gardening in the south and ran a regularly featured column which appeared in several newspapers and magazines. She designed spaces to enhance post offices for the U.S. Department of the Treasury and created the Memorial Park in Sumter, South Carolina. Based on her experience, she then served as Sumter Superintendent of Parks and Trees for twenty years. Dillon remained in Sumter after retiring. She continued writing until 1954, despite losing both her hearing and her sight. Julia Lester Dillon died in Sumter on March 24, 1959. She is buried in Magnolia Cemetery in Augusta, Georgia. She was inscribed upon the Georgia Women of Achievement roster in 2003.

== Biography ==
Julia Lester was born on March 9, 1871, in Warren County, Georgia, to Martha (née Pemble) and Benjamin D. Lester and grew up in Augusta, Georgia. In 1866, she graduated from Tubman High School of Augusta and went on to further her education at Peabody College, where she earned her teaching credentials in 1890. That same year, she began teaching and was working at the Davidson Grammar School in Augusta. Lester married William Bennett Dillon, who was principal of Central Grammar School, in 1892 but was widowed by 1894. Forced to be self-supporting, Dillon returned to teaching and taught for several years at Houghton Grammar School; then in Louisiana between 1905 and 1906; and later at a women's night school, D'Antignac School, for several years. Because of hearing loss, possibly due to diphtheria, she looked for other sources of income, including writing and becoming a stenographer for Dr. T. E. Oertel for a time.

== Landscape career ==
In 1907 she took courses at Columbia University and later at Harvard College in landscape design. She began a private practice in Augusta working on residential landscapes and expanded to the public sector, completing projects for both parks and schools. She continued writing in the 1910s and 1920s, publishing articles about southern gardening in The Florists' Exchange, The Flower Grower and House and Garden, as well as publishing an ongoing column on gardening for The Augusta Chronicle. Between 1914 and 1917, she was commissioned by the U.S. Department of the Treasury to landscape several post offices and custom houses in Florida, Georgia and North and South Carolina. In addition to her commissioned work, Dillon also created a project to teach gardening to children. The Merchants and Manufacturers Association provided funds for school children to plant on empty lots and offered prizes for beautification. The project was so successful that it was launched into a citywide campaign which included involvement from businesses and various civic organizations. During World War I, Dillon joined the Red Cross and along with other women participated in the Woman's Messenger Motor Service, (officially called the Red Cross Motor Corps) and made both garments and surgical supplies. In 1919, she served on the board of the State Federation of Professional and Businesswomen's Club, which in addition to improving the professional prospects of women, urged the legislature to grant suffrage.

In 1920, land was donated by citizens in Sumter, South Carolina, to create Memorial Park as a memorial to soldiers from the first World War; Dillon was hired to complete the design and supervise the project. Though she moved to Sumter, around the same time, Dillon was elected to serve as the Chairman of the Forestry Committee for the Georgia Federation of Women's Clubs. In 1921, she attended the Forestry Congress in her capacity as chair and was considered one of the experts in her field. Her 1922 book, The Blossom Circle of the Year in Southern Gardens, became widely known and then in 1927, she pushed for the founding of Sumter's first garden club. When she moved to Sumter, Dillon continued with her writing, publishing columns on gardening which regularly appeared in both The Sumter Daily Item and The State published in Columbia, South Carolina, as well as The Atlanta Journal-Constitution. Upon completion of the city park, Dillon was offered a full-time position as the city landscape architect, in 1928 as the Sumter Superintendent of Parks and Trees. Among many projects she planned during this period was the 1938 design for Swan Lake Iris Gardens, though the land was not donated until 1949, after Dillon's retirement in 1948. When she retired, Dillon returned to Georgia and continued writing about gardening even though she had also began to lose her sight. Her column ran in the Flower Grower magazine from 1936 to 1954.

She died on March 24, 1959, in Augusta, Georgia, and was buried at the Magnolia Cemetery beside her husband. Posthumously, in 1965 a plaque bearing her name was erected by the Sumter Garden Club to honor her contributions to the city and in 2003, she was inscribed upon the Georgia Women of Achievement roster. Dillon is credited with coining the phrase "The Garden City of the South" to refer to Augusta, Georgia, and was called the "dean of Southern gardening" by Flower Grower magazine.

== Projects ==
- 1914 Twin Gables gardens, Augusta, Georgia
- 1917 Thomasville Georgia Post Office landscape
- 1920–1924 Memorial Park, Sumter, South Carolina

== Selected works ==
- Dillon, Julia Lester (1922). The blossom circle of the year in southern gardens. New York, New York: A.T. De La Mare Company. OCLC 1718636.
- Dillon, Julia Lester (1931). Landscape design: twenty lessons. Augusta, Georgia. OCLC 71049064.
