= Mary Lyndon =

Mary Lyndon may refer to:

- Mary Dorothy Lyndon (1877–1924), American academic
- Mary Lyndon Shanley (born 1944), American feminist legal scholar
- Mary Lyndon: Or, Revelations of a Life: An Autobiography, 1855 autobiography of American women's rights advocate Mary Gove Nichols
