= Edith Foster =

Edith Foster may refer to:

- Edith Dunham Foster (1864–1950), American filmmaker
- Edith Lenora Foster (1906–1996), American librarian, educator, historian, and author
