= Lollie Belle Wylie =

American poet and composer (1858–1923)

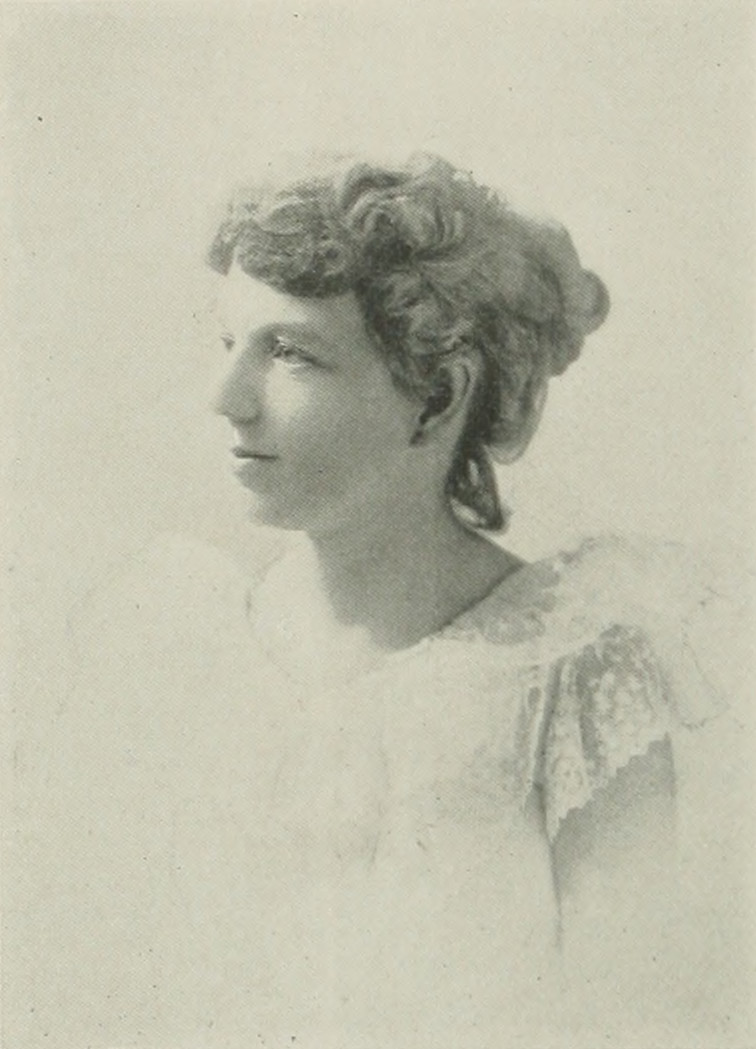
- Wylie in 1893
- Born: Laura Isabelle Moore; October 21, 1858; Bayou Coque d’Inde, Alabama, U.S.
- Died: February 16, 1923 (aged 64); Atlanta, Georgia, U.S.
- Other names: Lollie Belle Moore Wylie, Mrs. Hart Wylie, Laura Isabelle Wylie
- Occupations: journalist, writer, musician
- Known for: first paid woman journalist in Georgia
- Notable work: Wrote the music to "Georgia", the official state song of Georgia from 1922–1979
- Spouse: Hart Wylie (m. June 4, 1877)

Lollie Belle Wylie (October 21, 1858 – February 16, 1923) was an American poet and composer from Atlanta, Georgia. She was the first paid woman journalist in Georgia and composed the music for the song, which was the official state anthem from 1922 to 1979. She was one of the founders of the Georgia Women's Press Club and the Atlanta Writers Club. In addition to supporting forest preservation, Wylie was the historian for the "Uncle Remus" Memorial Association. In 2013, she was inducted into the Georgia Women of Achievement.

== Early life ==
Laura Isabelle Moore was born on October 21, 1858, in Bayou Coque d’Inde, Alabama to Augusta (née Ellis) and Thomas Polk Moore. Her father was a physician and died in 1859. Six years later, in 1865, the family relocated to Atlanta, Georgia. On June 4, 1877, Moore married Hart Wylie (1855-1887) and subsequently, the couple had two daughters, Augusta Louisa and Hart.

== Career ==
Upon the death of her husband in 1887, Wylie began to make her living as a writer. Her first published book of poems, Legend of the Cherokee Rose: and other poems was published in 1887 and soon thereafter, she began working at The Atlanta Constitution, as the first woman paid to work as a journalist in Georgia. She managed the women's department of the paper. Between 1890 and 1892, she published an independent paper called Society. In 1891, she formed the Georgia Women's Press Club, serving as its vice president, along with charter members, Gertrude Bealer, Ella Goode Byington (president), Ivy McAfee, Essie McMillan, Maude Andrews Ohl, Mrs. A. P. Penn, Mary Pfohl, Minnie Quinn (secretary/treasurer), Mrs. W. S. Williams, Rosa Woodbury, and her daughter, Gussie Wylie.

Wylie's works appeared in the Pittsburgh Press and the Atlanta Messenger and were featured at the Cotton States and International Exposition during Lollie Belle Wylie Day. The program of the Women's Building on that day was made up entirely of her songs, poems and essays. She was appointed to head the women's department of the 1908 State Fair. Wylie co-founded the Atlanta Writers Club in 1909 and in 1918, she was elected to the presidency of the organization During her term as president, she came up with the idea of planting trees in an "Author's Grove" at Piedmont Park.

Wylie composed songs in addition to publishing poems. She wrote "Dream Bell", "Where Fadeless Roses Blow", "Thou Art My Prayer", "Witch Hart" and other songs. She also composed the music to "Georgia" which was the state's official state song between 1922 and 1979. In 1914, a play she wrote, "The Golden Goose" won an award as best play written by an author in Atlanta and was performed at the Lyric Theater. Her book, The Arcades first published in 1916, was reprinted in a second edition in 1921. Wylie served as a delegate to the Good Roads Convention and the American Forestry Association convention and was a supporter of forest preservation. She also served as the historian of the Joel Chandler Harris "Uncle Remus" Memorial Association.

Wylie died following a brief illness on February 16, 1923, in Atlanta and was buried the following day at Oakland Cemetery. Posthumously, in 1926 a granite marker was placed in her honor at the "Author's Grove" in Piedmont Park and in 2013, she was inducted into the Georgia Women of Achievement.

== Selected works ==
- Wylie, Lollie Belle (1887). Legend of the Cherokee Rose: and other poems. Atlanta, Georgia: J.P. Harrison & Company. OCLC 1491479.
- Wylie, Lollie Belle (1896). The secret of Matanzas Bay. Atlanta, Georgia. OCLC 8390534.
- Wylie, Lollie Belle (1916). The arcades. Atlanta, Georgia: A.B. Caldwell. OCLC 1629606.
