= Jane Yarn =

American conservationist and environmentalist

- Born: Jane Hurt Yarn; October 5, 1924; Greenville, South Carolina, United States
- Died: October 18, 1995 (aged 71)
- Education: Saint Mary's School
- Alma mater: University of Georgia
- Occupation(s): Conservationist; Environmentalist
- Years active: 1967–1995
- Spouse: Charles Yarn (m. 1944)
- Children: 3
- Awards: Georgia Women of Achievement

Jane Hurt Yarn (October 15, 1924 – October 18, 1995) was an American conservationist and environmentalist. She became interested in the environment in 1967, and focused on protecting Georgia's coastal islands, barrier islands and marshes. Yarn was the recipient of several awards, including induction into the Georgia Women of Achievement in 2009.

== Biography ==
=== Early life ===
Yarn was born on October 15, 1924, in Greenville, South Carolina. She was the daughter of Edna Brown and John Henry Hurt. Yarn was brought up in Scottsboro, Alabama. She was educated at Saint Mary's School in Raleigh, North Carolina. At the University of Georgia, Yarn conducted post graduate work in landscape design. She married physician Charles Yarn in 1944. They moved to Atlanta where they had three children, and Yarn took part in local charitable acts.

=== Career ===
She became interested in the environment while on a 1967 family trip to Africa. After returning to Georgia, Yarn spent one year researching Georgia's problems with preservation. She served on the boards on the Georgia Conservancy and the state chapter of the Nature Conservancy as its Vice Chairperson in 1969, the organizations' first woman in such a position, as well as organizing the state's coastal landowners against development. Yarn succeeded in lobbying against mining on Little Tybee Island, and focused her attention on the protection of Georgia's coastal islands and marshes. Her efforts also ensured other barrier islands were preserved including Cumberland Island and Wassaw Island. Yarn was able to successfully organize of Georgia's garden club members to stop a plan to strip-mine the state's barrier islands for phosphate. Due to her efforts, a large number of letters were addressed to the Governor of Georgia Lester Maddox.

Yarn founded the environmental lobbying organization in Georgia, the Save Our Vital Environment, in 1969. The organization worked to get the 1970 Coastal Marshlands Protection Act to be passed into law. She became noted to smoothly work with politicians from the Republican and Democrat parties. She helped Jimmy Carter in environmental lobbying while serving as Georgia's governor, and nominated Yarn to serve as a member on the Council on Environmental Quality after he was elected U.S. president. Yarn worked with the division for three years. She was most proud of her efforts in getting the Alaska National Interest Lands Conservation Act passed into law. In the Carter Administration's final days when the president was dealing with large-scale world events, she convinced him to sign legislation which created three new National Marine Sanctuaries.

=== Later years and death ===
After the Carter Administration ended, Yarn returned to Georgia, and remained on working on environmental problems with several organizations including The Wilderness Society, National Wildlife Federation and the Southern Environmental Law Center. She died on October 18, 1995, after battling with breast cancer during the previous 20 years.

== Legacy ==
Yarn was considered by Georgia Encyclopedia as a pioneering conservationist and environmentalist. According to senator and former Governor of Georgia Zell Miller, "No other single individual has done as much for conservation in Georgia as Jane Yarn." She was featured in the Atlanta Journal Constitution Magazine and Harper's Bazaar magazine. In 1970, Yarn was named Atlanta's Women of the Year. She was a recipient of the American Motors Conservation Award in 1971. In April 1978, Yarn was the first person to receive the R.S. Howard natural resources conservation award. She received the Nature Conservancy Oak Leaf Award in 1989, and four years later, the Georgia Environmental Council made her a recipient of their Lifetime Achievement Award. Yarn was inducted into the Georgia Women of Achievement in 2009.
