= Cassandra Pickett Durham =

American physician

- Born: Cassandra Pickett; May 21, 1824; Fairfield County, South Carolina
- Died: October 18, 1885 (aged 61); Americus, Georgia
- Other name: Cassandra Pickett Windsor
- Education: Reform Medical College
- Medical career
- Profession: Physician
- Field: Eclectic medicine

Cassandra Pickett Windsor Durham (May 21, 1824 – October 18, 1885) was an American medical doctor and the first woman to earn a medical degree in the U.S. state of Georgia.

== Biography ==
Durham was born Cassandra Pickett in 1824 to John Jeptha Pickett Sr. and Nancy Boulware in Fairfield County, South Carolina. She grew up in Stewart County, Georgia and married Jonathan Windsor in 1845. After Windsor's death six years later, she married John Pryor Durham, a physician, in 1854. Cassandra Durham would often accompany her second husband when he tended to patients, and together they had four children. After her husband died in 1869, she sent her children to live with relatives and moved to Macon, Georgia to attend its Reform Medical College.

After graduating from the Reform Medical College, Durham became the first woman in the state of Georgia to earn a degree in medicine. She moved to Americus, Georgia and took up eclectic medicine, gathering and preparing medicinal herbs herself. In 1871, a local newspaper in Americus referred to her as a "Doctress in Medicine" and "a professional acquisition to the city". She practiced in Americus for over 15 years, and although some male doctors objected to her practice, she built a successful practice with a patient base in and around Americus. A local journalist wrote at the time that Durham "has as good a knowledge of medicine as most of the gentlemen who practice. She commands the respect of every gentleman and lady of this section and is doing good business."

Durham died suddenly in 1885 when she developed acute apoplexy while treating a patient.

== Legacy ==
After Durham's death, four successive generations of her family continued the practice of medicine. She was inducted into the list of Georgia Women of Achievement in 1993.
