= Ruth Hartley Mosley =

- Born: Ruth Price; September 23, 1886; Savannah, Georgia
- Died: August 14, 1975 (aged 88); Savannah, Georgia
- Resting place: Linwood Cemetery
- Occupations: Nurse; entrepreneur; mortician
- Spouses: Richard Hartley (m. 1917; death 1931); Fischer Mosley (m. 1937; death 1975)

Ruth Price Hartley Mosley (September 23, 1886 – August 14, 1975) was an American nurse, businesswoman, and civil rights activist. In 1910, she became the first black woman to be the head of a nursing department. Mosley was also one of the first women to be licensed as an embalmer.

Ruth Price was born on September 23, 1886 in Savannah, Georgia; her father was a bootmaker and her mother was a dressmaker. After finishing high school, Mosley studied nursing in Concord, North Carolina and at Provident Hospital in Chicago. She went on to work at the Georgia State Sanitarium in Milledgeville, where she was appointed head of the "Colored Females Department" in 1910.

After she married Richard Hartley in 1917, the couple moved to Macon, where Mosley became one of the first women to be a licensed embalmer in order to help him with his work running a newly purchased funeral home — Hartley's saloon had been forced to close due to the Volstead Act. After Hartley's death on October 1, 1931, she married Fischer Mosley in 1937 and worked as a nurse for the Bibb County school system. At one point, she owned over 100 rental properties. Fischer died on May 12, 1975.

Mosley was part of Macon's NAACP chapter, and was a founding member of the Booker T. Washington Community Center. She also enjoyed playing bridge.

Mosley died in Savannah on August 14, 1975. She left money to establish the Ruth Hartley Mosley Memorial Fund and the Ruth Hartley Mosley Memorial Women's Center. Mosley was added to the Georgia Women of Achievement in 1994.
