= Mamie George S. Williams =

American politician (1872–1951)

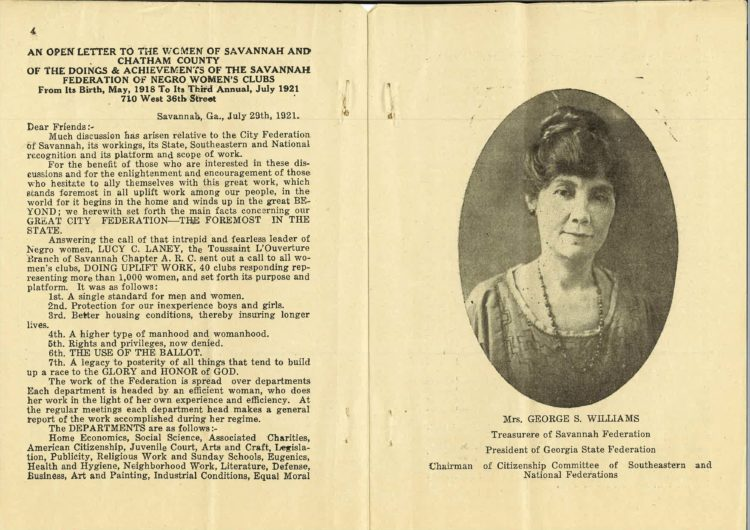
- Williams in a program for the Savannah Federation of Negro Women's Clubs, 1921
- Born: Mary Frances Miller; April 1872; Savannah, Georgia, U.S.
- Died: July 8, 1951 (aged 79); Savannah, Georgia, U.S.
- Parent: Sarah Miller (mother) Reverend James Miller (father)

Mamie George S. Williams was a politician from Georgia and served on the Republican National Committee. In 1924, Williams became the first woman from Georgia and first African American woman to speak on the floor of the Republican National Convention. She is a member of the Georgia Women of Achievement hall of fame.

== Early life ==
Williams was born in April, 1872 in Savannah, Georgia to Reverend James and Sarah Miller. Her given name was Mary Frances, but she was called Mamie. Williams was educated at the Beach Institute in Savannah and at the Atlanta University. After completing her education, Williams married twice but was twice widowed. Her second husband's first name was "George," so she was often referred to as Mrs. George S. Williams. Eventually, she became known to many as "Mamie George."

== Civic service ==
During World War I Williams began her career in civic service by supporting war efforts at home such as Liberty Loan Drives. Additionally, she dedicated over 2,400 hours of volunteer work for the Toussaint L'Ouverture branch of the American Red Cross.

== Political career ==
=== Voter mobilization ===
In 1920, after the Nineteenth Amendment was passed which granted women the right to vote, Williams took action and registered such a large number of African American women to vote that the governor suddenly stopped voter registration so that ancillary laws could be passed. During the 1920 presidential election, Williams was credited with turning out over 40,000 women from Georgia to vote. Her voting campaign, which included picketing polling centers and making speeches, spread throughout 160 counties.

=== National Republican Committee ===
In 1924 Williams became the first woman from Georgia and the first African-American woman in the United States to be appointed to the National Republican Committee. That same year Williams was she was the first woman given the right to speak on the floor of the Republican National Convention. On the floor, she defended the Georgia delegation whose seats were in danger because a white faction of the party wanted to strip black Republicans of their power. Shortly after the 1924 Republican National Convention, Williams created the first political organization composed of only African American women in the United States, the National Republican League of Colored Women Voters.

Until 1932, Williams held a position of political power, however, her political influence was stripped from her that year by a contingency of white politicians, whose mission was to remove black Republicans from key political positions.

== Community influence ==
=== Women's clubs ===
Aside from her career in politics and civic service, Williams was also heavily influential with United States women's clubs. Established in 1924, Williams was a charter member of the Southeast Federation of Colored Women's Club, and during the same year she became the president of the Georgia Federation of Colored Women's Clubs. Furthermore, she served as the Vice-President of the National Association of Colored Women's Clubs, "serving with such venerable women as Hallie Q. Brown, Mary Church Terrell, Ida B. Wells, and Mary McLeod Bethune." Williams also was involved with the Girl Scouts in Savannah and eventually had a troop named after her.

=== Business ===
Williams was a director of the Carver State Bank and also as a board member of Central State College in Macon, Georgia. Additionally, in the 1940s, Williams led movements to establish a public colored recreation and swimming pool in Savannah and also helped secure a grant to establish a state home for African-American girls in Macon.

== Death and legacy ==
Mamie Williams died in the Savannah Charity Hospital in 1951, and since her death, many remember her as one of the pioneers for African-American women in politics.

In 2018 she was posthumously named a Georgia Woman of Achievement.

In May 2023, a historical marker honoring her was unveiled at the Carnegie library at 537 E. Henry St. in Savannah, Georgia.
