= Rhoda Kaufman =

American activist

- Kaufman in an undated photograph
- Born: October 26, 1888; Columbus, Georgia, United States
- Died: March 4, 1956 (aged 67); Atlanta, Georgia, United States
- Resting place: Oakland Cemetery
- Education: Vanderbilt University
- Occupation: Social activist

Rhoda Kaufman (October 26, 1888 – March 4, 1956) was an American social activist from Georgia. A Jewish woman born to German immigrants, she moved to Atlanta after graduating from college and participated in numerous social activist organizations.

== Early life and career ==
Rhoda Kaufman was born on October 26, 1888, in Columbus, Georgia. Her parents, Leo Kaufman and Bettie Friedlaender, were middle-class Jewish-German immigrants. At the age of 12, Kaufman lost one of her legs and had to use crutches for the rest of her life. In 1909, she graduated from Vanderbilt University as a member of Phi Beta Kappa, with a Bachelor of Science degree in physics, logic, and psychology. Shortly after graduation, she moved to Atlanta, where she pursued a career in journalism with little success. While in Atlanta, she joined the local chapter of the American Association of University Women, eventually becoming the chapter's president. Between 1913 and 1915, she spearheaded efforts in the group to support a training school for girls in the state and a training school for mentally disabled people.

In 1920, she was hired as an assistant secretary for the newly created Georgia Department of Public Welfare. Several years later, in 1923, she was promoted to executive secretary of the department. Her push for more progressive reform efforts caused the ire of the Ku Klux Klan, which had had a recent resurgence around this time, and an anti-Semitic letter from the group that attacked Kaufman circulated in 1928. The letter, combined with poor health, caused Kaufman to resign from her post in 1928. During the mid-1920s, Kaufman had also worked with local African American leaders in Atlanta, such as Morehouse College president John Hope and Thomas J. Woofter from the Commission on Interracial Cooperation to help them receive funds from the Commonwealth Fund and Rosenwald Fund.

In 1930, President Herbert Hoover invited Kaufman to participate in a National Conference of Social Work as part of his plan to recruit national experts to assess welfare conditions in the country. Following her retirement in 1945, she remained socially active, joining groups such as the League of Women Voters, the United Nations Women's Organization, and the Institute for Citizenship. She was also a member of the Atlanta Temple.

== Death and legacy ==
Kaufman died on March 4, 1956, in Atlanta. She was buried in the Jewish section of Oakland Cemetery. In 1998, she was inducted into the Georgia Women of Achievement.
