= Atlanta Symphony Orchestra =

Orchestra in Atlanta, Georgia, USA

Atlanta Symphony Orchestra (ASO)
- Orchestra
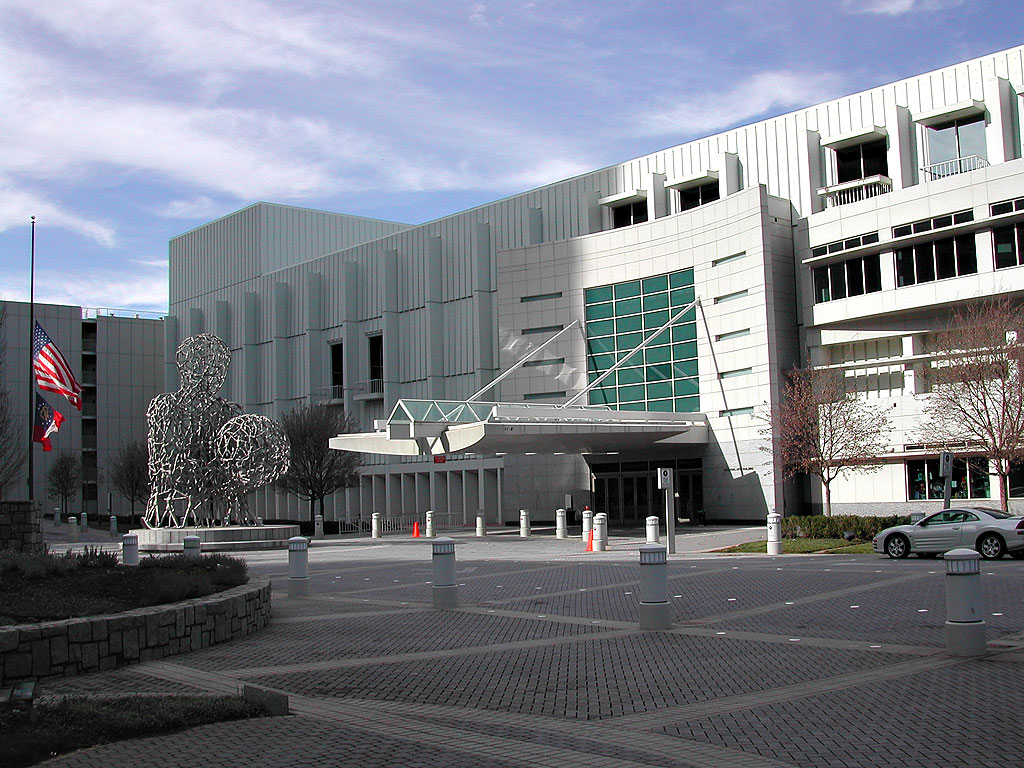
- The Woodruff Arts Center
- Former name: Atlanta Youth Symphony
- Founded: 1945
- Concert hall: Atlanta Symphony Hall, Woodruff Arts Center
- Principal conductor: Nathalie Stutzmann
- Website: aso.org
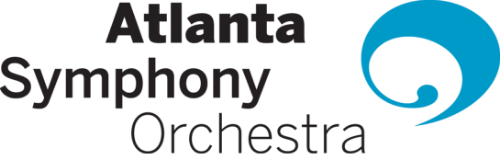

The Atlanta Symphony Orchestra (ASO) is an American orchestra based in Atlanta, Georgia, United States. The ASO's main concert venue is Atlanta Symphony Hall in the Woodruff Arts Center.

== History ==
Though earlier organizations bearing the same name date back as far as 1923, thanks largely to the efforts of Josephine Fields Sanders, the orchestra was officially founded in 1945 and played its first concert as the Atlanta Youth Symphony under the direction of Henry Sopkin, a Chicago music educator who remained its conductor until 1966. The organization changed to its current name in 1947 and soon began attracting well known soloists such as Isaac Stern and Glenn Gould. In 1967, with the departure of Sopkin, Robert Shaw (founder of the Robert Shaw Chorale) became the music director, and a year later the orchestra became full-time. In 1970, Shaw founded a choir, the Atlanta Symphony Orchestra Chorus. In 1988, Yoel Levi became music director and principal conductor. Under him, the orchestra played Summon the Heroes composed and conducted by John Williams at the opening and closing ceremonies of the Centennial 1996 Summer Olympics in Atlanta. Levi became music director emeritus in 2000, and was succeeded as music director by Robert Spano. Allison Vulgamore was hired as president of the orchestra in 1993, remaining in the role until 2009. The current executive director of the ASO is Jennifer Barlament, since January 2016.

The orchestra toured Europe under Yoel Levi in 1991; and with its chorus, under Robert Shaw, in 1988. In 2006 the orchestra and its chamber chorus, under Robert Spano, served as the resident ensemble for California's Ojai Festival. The full ASO Chorus has thrice visited Berlin, giving three performances on each occasion of Benjamin Britten's War Requiem (2003), Hector Berlioz's Grande Messe des Morts (2008), and Johannes Brahms's Ein Deutsches Requiem (2009) with the Berlin Philharmonic Orchestra under ASO Principal Guest Conductor Donald Runnicles.

Since 2005, the orchestra had been actively planning for the construction of a new principal concert hall. In 2008, the ASO opened its new 12,000-seat Verizon Wireless Amphitheatre at Encore Park in north Fulton County in the town of Alpharetta, some 22 miles north of Atlanta, where it presents concerts of its own as well as those by various pops groups. Encore Park and the Amphitheatre are owned by the Woodruff Arts Center, the ASO's parent organization. Including Encore Park and its activities at Atlanta Symphony Hall and Chastain Park, the ASO expects to present more than 300 performances annually. With a budget expected to increase to US$50 million with the completion of its new Amphitheatre, the ASO has become one of the six or seven largest orchestras in America, by budget size. The ASO's budget includes not only the costs of production, along with musician and staff salaries and benefits, but also the orchestra's very significant expenditures on education, community outreach, special events and fundraising.

Past assistant conductors of the ASO have included Joseph Young. The current associate conductor of the ASO is Jerry Hou. One noted past ASO member was Jane Little, who debuted as a double bassist in Atlanta on February. 4, 1945, at the age of 16. Said to be the longest-tenured orchestra musician in the world, Little remained a member of the ASO for the rest of her life until her death on May 15, 2016, at age 87, a few hours after collapsing during an ASO concert.

In December 2020, Nathalie Stutzmann first guest-conducted the ASO. She returned in February 2021 for an additional guest-conducting engagement, in a streamed quarantine concert. In October 2021, the ASO announced the appointment of Stutzmann as its next music director, effective with the 2022–2023 season, with an initial contract of four years. Stutzmann is the first female conductor to be named music director of the ASO. In November 2025, the orchestra announced an extension of Stutzmann's contract as its music director through the 2028–2029 season.

The orchestra was featured on R.E.M.'s 1991 album Out of Time, most notably on "Losing My Religion". Members of the orchestra performed with the band on November 10, 1991, when R.E.M. recorded a special live performance of "Losing My Religion" for an MTV 10th Anniversary Special. Members of the orchestra also recorded parts on four songs on R.E.M.'s next album, 1992's Automatic for the People.

== Recordings ==
ASO logo used prior to 2009

The orchestra and chorus made their first recording, a 2-LP Christmas album entitled Nativity, for Turnabout/Vox Records in 1975, conducted by Robert Shaw. This was an album directly based on their annual Christmas concert. A slightly shortened version of the 75-minute album was issued by Vox in the 1990s on compact disc under the title Christmas with Robert Shaw.

In 1978, the ASO became the first American orchestra to make a digital recording intended for commercial release, when it played Igor Stravinsky's Firebird suite and excerpts from Alexander Borodin's opera, Prince Igor, for the Telarc label. The Telarc association, which resulted in 26 Grammy Awards, continued until 2010, one of the longest continuous associations of an orchestra with a record label. In 2011 the orchestra began releasing recordings on its own ASO Media label. In 2004, the orchestra began a project to record for the Deutsche Grammophon label several works by composer Osvaldo Golijov.

One of the orchestra and chorus's best-known recordings, of Beethoven's Ninth Symphony conducted by Robert Shaw, was recorded for the now defunct Pro Arte label, and is out of print, though excerpts from the "Ode to Joy" fourth movement may be found in anthologies issued on the Reference Gold and Classical Heritage labels. Another of the ASO's recordings now out-of-print because it was recorded for the Pro Arte label is that of Brahms's Piano Concerto No. 1, with Peter Serkin as soloist and Robert Shaw conducting. It is one of the few recordings without a chorus that the orchestra made with Shaw.

The ASO released in 2024 a recording of Dvořák's Symphony No. 9 "From the New World" and American Suite, conducted by Nathalie Stutzmann, pairing the composer's celebrated symphony with the lesser-known American Suite, which was written around the same time but not premiered until shortly after Dvořák's death.

== Labor disputes ==
The ASO has suffered from labor disputes between management and musicians in recent years. In 2012, musicians agreed to decrease by ten weeks of pay yearly in order to help balance the ASO's budget, which had seen a major deficit in part due to years of mismanagement and declining ticket sales. As a result, the orchestra's season changed from 52 weeks to a 42 weeks. In 2014, per the Atlanta Journal-Constitution, the orchestra's management and principal musicians faced a 6 September 2014 deadline to reach a collective bargaining agreement or face delaying the opening of the season. This continued a rancorous history between management and players, as they attempt to extricate themselves from operating in the red, as had been the case for many years. The local paper also indicated that their touted "operating budget" was unsustainable for a variety of reasons. In September 2014, after musicians refused to agree to a new contract, management locked out the players and putting the beginning of the 2014–15 season in jeopardy. The lockout ended up lasting beyond the scheduled date at which the season was supposed to start, on September 25.

== Music directors ==
- Henry Sopkin (1945–1966)
- Robert Shaw (1967–1988)
- Yoel Levi (1988–2000)
- Robert Spano (2001–2021)
- Nathalie Stutzmann (2022–present)
