= Sarah Harper Heard =

American educator, activist, librarian, and gardener

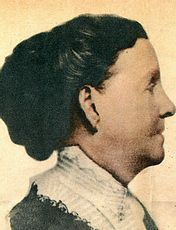
- Heard in 1910
- Born: 1853; Newton County, Georgia; United States
- Died: April 9, 1919 (aged 65–66)
- Resting place: Elmhurt Cemetery; Elberton, Georgia
- Occupations: Educator, activist, librarian, gardener
- Known for: Seaboard Airline Railway Free Traveling Library System

Sarah Harper Heard (1853 – April 9, 1919) was an American educator, activist, librarian, and gardener. Well-educated and interested in many topics, Heard was described by an acquaintance as "one of those magnificent Victorian women who had a super-charged energy, which home life could never use up".

== Early life ==
Heard was born in Newton County, Georgia in 1853 to John H. Harper and Susan Rebecca Oliver. She married Eugene B. Heard, former president of Georgia Stephen Heard's grandson, when she was 19 years old; the couple moved into the Heard family's 2,000-acre Rose Hill Plantation in Elbert County.

== Women's clubs ==
In 1892, Heard founded the first women's club in Georgia, the Elberton Sorosis Club. Together with the Atlanta Woman's Club and its founder Rebecca Lowe, she founded the Georgia Federation of Women's Clubs.

== Traveling libraries ==
Starting from 1897, women's clubs were instrumental in developing and implementing traveling libraries, as the Georgia General Assembly had yet to provision any funds for state libraries. Heard was further driven towards establishing libraries following the early death of her book-loving son Thomas; she opened a library at Rose Hill which quickly gained popularity.

=== Seaboard Airline Railway Free Traveling Library System ===
The library collection at Rose Hill would soon develop into the Seaboard Airline Railway Free Traveling Library System. Heard met with and persuaded the vice president and general manager of Seaboard Air Line Railroad, Everett St. John, to have the company transport books to every railroad stop; these small libraries came to be called "S.A.L. Magundi Clubs". St. John went on to contact Andrew Carnegie, who donated $1,000 towards the effort and called Heard "the right woman at the right time". Thus began in 1898 the Seaboard Airline Railway Free Traveling Library System; due to his support, Heard sometimes referred to the program as the "Andrew Carnegie Free Traveling Library".

Heard also traveled to New York City, where she met with book editors and publishing houses to establish business agreements and request donations, and then back to Georgia via the Eastern seaboard, recruiting librarians across six states along the way. Her overall efforts were so successful that the New York Daily Tribune noted that the donations "enabled [Heard] to send the boxes in all directions. Quantities of books have been given and the rooms at Rose Hill, which were used as a distributing headquarters, are now overcrowded". By the turn of the century, the Seaboard library system boasted a collection of over 2,500 books and attracted so much support that it was able to donate entire libraries to deserving schools. Heard was named Seaboard's Superintendent [of] Traveling Libraries in 1901. By 1910, books were being circulated from Rose Hill to 35 community libraries and 150 school libraries; by 1912, the Seaboard library system comprised 18,000 books and 38,000 magazines. A number of publications came from the United States Department of Agriculture.

In a 1901 special edition titled "Free Traveling Libraries", Seaboard's promotional magazine S.A.L. Magundi published an assortment of letters communicating with and praising Heard, written by notable figures including President William McKinley, the governor of Alabama, Florida governor William Sherman Jennings, Georgia governor Allen D. Candler, North Carolina governor Charles Brantley Aycock, South Carolina governor Miles Benjamin McSweeney, Virginia governor James Hoge Tyler, Andrew Carnegie, and Georgia State School Superintendent G. R. Glenn.

Heard worked to establish twelve "McKinley libraries" in 1902, dedicated to "the characteristics and high ideals so exemplified in the life and purposes of [President William] McKinley". The traveling library system won a gold medal award at the 1907 Jamestown Exposition in Virginia.

Following the death of Georgia Library Association president Walter B. Hill in 1905, Heard was appointed to fill the role and went on to serve four terms as president and longer after that as second president.

Seaboard continued to transport books to small towns and libraries in need across the region until 1955, leaving behind new libraries scattered among small communities across the Southeast. The library system never charged fees for late or lost books. Its collection of books was donated to schools across Georgia.

== Gardening ==
A master gardener, Heard played a crucial role in developing the Elberta peach. She also took care of the gardens around Rose Hill, which would go on to be featured in the 1933 University of Georgia Press book The Garden History of Georgia 1733–1933.

== Personal life ==
Sarah and Eugene Heard had two children, an older daughter, Susan ("Sue"), and a younger son, Thomas, who died at the age of 12.

Heard died in 1919, and her husband Eugene died on March 31, 1934. Following her mother's death, Heard's daughter Susan took over management of the Seaboard library system as head librarian until her death on April 7, 1934; Susan's husband James Y. Swift then took over management.

== Legacy ==
In 2016, Heard was inducted into the Georgia Women of Achievement Hall of Fame.
