= Josephine Fields Sanders =

American teacher and musician

Josephine F. Sanders
- Born: January 1, 1895; Dallas, Texas
- Died: March 18, 1975 (aged 80)
- Education: Georgetown University
- Known for: Establishment of the Atlanta Symphony Orchestra
- Spouse: James O'Hear Sanders

Josephine Fields Sanders (January 1, 1895 – March 18, 1975) was an American teacher and musician. Sanders played a key role in the formation of the Atlanta Symphony Orchestra in the mid-1940s.

Sanders was born on January 1, 1895 in Dallas, Texas. She graduated from Georgetown University, followed by graduate studies in violin and French at the University of Chicago and the Royal Conservatory of Brussels. Sanders then taught at Baylor University.

After World War I started, Sanders traveled to Europe to entertain American troops. She married James O'Hear Sanders after returning to the United States, who would later become the lead plaintiff in Gray v. Sanders (1963), a Supreme Court case which resulted in Georgia's county unit system being struck down as unconstitutional.

The Sanders family moved to Atlanta in the early 1940s. By 1943, Sanders had become president of the Atlanta Music Club. Sanders was unhappy that Atlanta was the largest city in the country without a professional orchestra, so she claimed that "Atlanta will grow an orchestra, not buy one". Starting with the In and About Atlanta Orchestra, Sanders raised funds to add professional musicians to the group, which soon became the Atlanta Youth Symphony Orchestra (AYSO).

The AYSO held a concert at the Atlanta Municipal Auditorium on February 4, 1945, conducted by Henry Sopkin. The sold-out performance led to the AYSO soon changing its name once again to become the Atlanta Symphony Orchestra.

She was also a supporter of the High Museum of Art.

Sanders died on March 18, 1975. She was added to the Georgia Women of Achievement in 2022.
