= Allison Vulgamore =

American orchestra executive

Allison Beth Vulgamore (born 1950s) is an American orchestra executive, known especially for her tenure with the Atlanta Symphony Orchestra.

Vulgamore is the daughter of Melvin L. Vulgamore, 13th president of Albion College. She received a bachelor's degree in music from the Oberlin College Conservatory of Music in 1980, graduated from the first class of the American Symphony Orchestra League (today League of American Orchestras) Management Fellowship in 1980, and in that year she became the artistic administrator and general manager of the National Symphony Orchestra, serving until 1985. While there she worked with Henry Fogel, who became her mentor. She next spent two years with the Philadelphia Orchestra before being appointed orchestra and, later, general manager of the New York Philharmonic, where she remained for six months. Her tenure as president of the Atlanta Symphony Orchestra began in 1993. There she helped develop the ensemble into one of the top orchestras in the United States; she also worked to find it a summer home in Alpharetta, Georgia, and otherwise became well known for her leadership and collaborative spirit. She hired music director Robert Spano and principal guest conductor Donald Runnicles in 2001, and with them has played a key role in fostering the so-called "Atlanta School", a loose group of composers who have a strong connection to the orchestra. Her tenure in Atlanta was generally well-regarded, although she was unable to finance a new concert hall, designed by Santiago Calatrava, which had been planned for the city. In 2009 she returned to the Philadelphia Orchestra as president and CEO. The orchestra was in financial crisis at her arrival, but Vulgamore has since overseen a renegotiation of musicians' salaries. She also oversaw the appointment of Yannick Nézet-Séguin as the orchestra's principal conductor and its declaration of Chapter 11 bankruptcy in 2011. Her contract was later renewed through 2014.

Vulgamore has no children; she was married to keyboardist Peter Marshall, a classmate from Oberlin, until their divorce in 2003.
