= Laura Pope Forester =

American folk artist

- Born: Laura Atkinson; 31 January 1873; Thomas County, Georgia, U.S.
- Died: 1953 (aged 79–80); Grady County, Georgia, U.S.
- Monuments: Pope's Museum, Georgia
- Occupation: Folk artist
- Spouse(s): B. H. Pope (1894–1911); J. F. Forester (m. 1914)
- Children: 2

Laura Pope Forester (also spelled Forrester; 31 January 1873 – 1953) was a self-taught American folk artist, who created one of the earliest outdoor art environments in the United States. By the time she died in 1953, the space around Forester's rural Georgia home and store featured over 200 concrete sculptures, many of which celebrated notable women in history and mythology.

== Life ==
Laura Pope Forester was born Laura Atkinson on 31 January 1873 in Thomas County, Georgia, the daughter of Hezekiah and Katura Davis Atkinson . As a child, she was taught to sculpt with clay and create dyes from berries and other natural materials. At 21, she married B. H. Pope, a school teacher. The couple had two sons, who were 12 and 14 when her husband died in 1911. She later married J. F. Forester.

Between 1917 and 1953, Laura Pope Forester created what is possibly the oldest known outside art space in the United States. Her works depicted people, particularly women, whose traits and achievements she admired, and included Cleopatra, World War I's Red Cross nurses, and Scarlett O’Hara. Forester typically built her figures using found objects, such as scrap iron and tin cans, which she then covered in concrete, and often coloured using handmade dyes.

Forester also painted prolifically, her works ranging from landscapes to religious and historical scenes. As well as on the interior walls of her home, she painted on stretched flour sacks and other homemade "canvases". In 1961, a newspaper report described Forester and her work:

Mrs. Forester’s inventiveness was almost as incredible as her talent. Besides using scrap iron from junkyards, discarded tin cans and other waste material as braces for her statues, she painted the figures with liquids of many flowers and brightly colored berries…

A journalist for the Macon Telegraph described Forester herself as:

a gracious, friendly lady, tiny brown curls slipping from the knot worn high upon her head, cool clear complexion, light brown eyes which brightened when she talked, and a charming smile. Her voice is lovely, low yet vibrant with life and her words have a way of rippling forth.

During her lifetime, Forester achieved national recognition, including by the Smithsonian journal, and the Library of Congress. She did not, however, exhibit her work in shows. Following her death, the home (by then known as 'Mrs Pope's Museum') remained as a roadside curiosity and tourist attraction, until it was sold in 1974. Many of the freestanding sculptures were removed, taken down, or destroyed, leaving only those built into the walls.

Today, Forester's former home is a museum. In 2021 Forester was added to the Georgia Women of Achievement hall of fame.
