= The War-Time Journal of a Georgia Girl =

American civil war diary

The War-Time Journal of a Georgia Girl is a diary written by Eliza Frances Andrews during the American Civil War. It focuses on the daily life of a young girl living in the Confederate States of America during the conflict.

It was published in 1908 in New York by D. Appleton and Company and is freely available in the public domain.

The War-Time Journal of a Georgia Girl

== Overview ==
=== Author and context ===
Eliza Frances Andrews, born in 1840 to a judge and planter in Washington, Georgia, chronicles her experiences during the war. Her family owned two hundred slaves, and while her parents supported the Union, Eliza supported the Confederacy along with her three brothers who fought for the Confederacy.

The journal entries span from 1864 to 1865, capturing the final stages of the conflict. Eliza's writing reflects the daily struggles, fears, and hopes of a young woman living in the midst of war.

=== Synopsis ===
The journal opens with Union forces under General Sherman encamped in Atlanta in December 1864. Her first article states that Eliza arrived safely in Macon while traveling to see her relatives, who would host her in Southwest Georgia until the end of the War. The remainder of the diary documents Eliza's everyday activities, conversations with Confederate soldiers, and visits with a range of family members and acquaintances, among them Julia Toombs, the well-known Georgia orator and Confederate Constitution author Robert Toombs's wife. Eliza is frequently upset by the Union soldier's treatment of Southerners and throughout the journal, advocates for the Confederate cause.

=== Controversy ===
Given it was published nearly 40 years after the war, Andrews decided to make significant edits between the time of writing and publishing. To avoid embarrassment, she omitted or heavily altered certain passages throughout the journal.

Andrews was a supporter of the Confederate cause, and her journal reflects her perspectives on the Union's actions during the war. However, by the time of the journal's publication in 1908, Andrews' views on slavery had evolved, and she expressed support for segregation.
