= Carolyn McKenzie Carter =

American photojournalist (1919–2010)

- Born: Carolyn McKenzie; 1919
- Died: April 21, 2010 (aged 90–91)
- Other names: Mrs. Don Carter; Carolyn Carter
- Education: University of Georgia
- Occupation: Photojournalist
- Spouse: Donnel Earl Carter (m. 1942)

Carolyn McKenzie Carter (1919 – April 21, 2010) was an American photojournalist who worked for the Atlanta Constitution (now The Atlanta Journal-Constitution) from 1940 until the early 1950s.

== Early life ==
Carter was born in 1919 and was raised in Moultrie, Georgia. She was a graduate of the Nashville-based Ward-Belmont School. She graduated from the University of Georgia's Henry W. Grady College of Journalism and Mass Communications in 1940.

Carter met Lieutenant Donnel Earl Carter, cousin of President Jimmy Carter and a journalist for a competing newspaper, when her work ended up on the front page of the paper and his was relegated to the end pages. The couple married in 1942.

== Career ==
In 1940, Carter was hired by Ralph McGill to work for the Atlanta Constitution, thereby becoming the first women to serve as a photojournalist at the publication. In the 1940s, she worked for the Gainesville Daily Register and the Alexandria Daily Town Talk newspapers. She would also work at The Atlanta Journal-Constitution's Sunday magazine where captured photographs of the American South.

When the war concluded, Carter began covering more domestic topics, which included one well-known image of a child showing how an iron lung was used. In 1954, Carter became a commercial photographer for the Coca-Cola Company, traveling overseas to document the organization's international expansion for its employee magazine, The Refresher. She worked at Coca-Cola for five years. In 1959, she moved to New York and did freelance work for the Georgia Department of Industry, Trade and Travel.

In 2012, her husband Don Carter created the University of Georgia Don E. and Carolyn McKenzie Carter Endowment for Journalism to fund the University’s Chair for Excellence in Journalism

Carter died on April 21, 2010.

== Selected publications ==
- Carter, Carolyn McKenzie (1943). "War Wives in Journalism". Matrix. 29 (6). Women in Communications: 7–.
- Carter, Carolyn (July 8, 1945). "Dangling on a rope under Georgia". The Atlanta Journal. pp. ,.
- Talmadge, Betty; Carter, Carolyn; Robitscher, Jean (November 15, 1977). How to Cook a Pig & Other Back-to-the-Farm Recipes: An Autobiographical Cookbook.

== Awards and honors ==
In 1959, Carter was designated a master photographer by the Professional Photographers of America. She was the first female named “Man of the Year” from the Industrial Photographers of America.

The Carolyn Carter Award was established in 1986 by Georgia's Department of Industry, Trade and Travel. In 2008, she was a member of the inaugural class of Grady Fellows at the University of Georgia.

Carter was inducted into the Georgia Women of Achievement Hall of Fame in 2017.
