= Lula Dobbs McEachern =

American teacher and activist

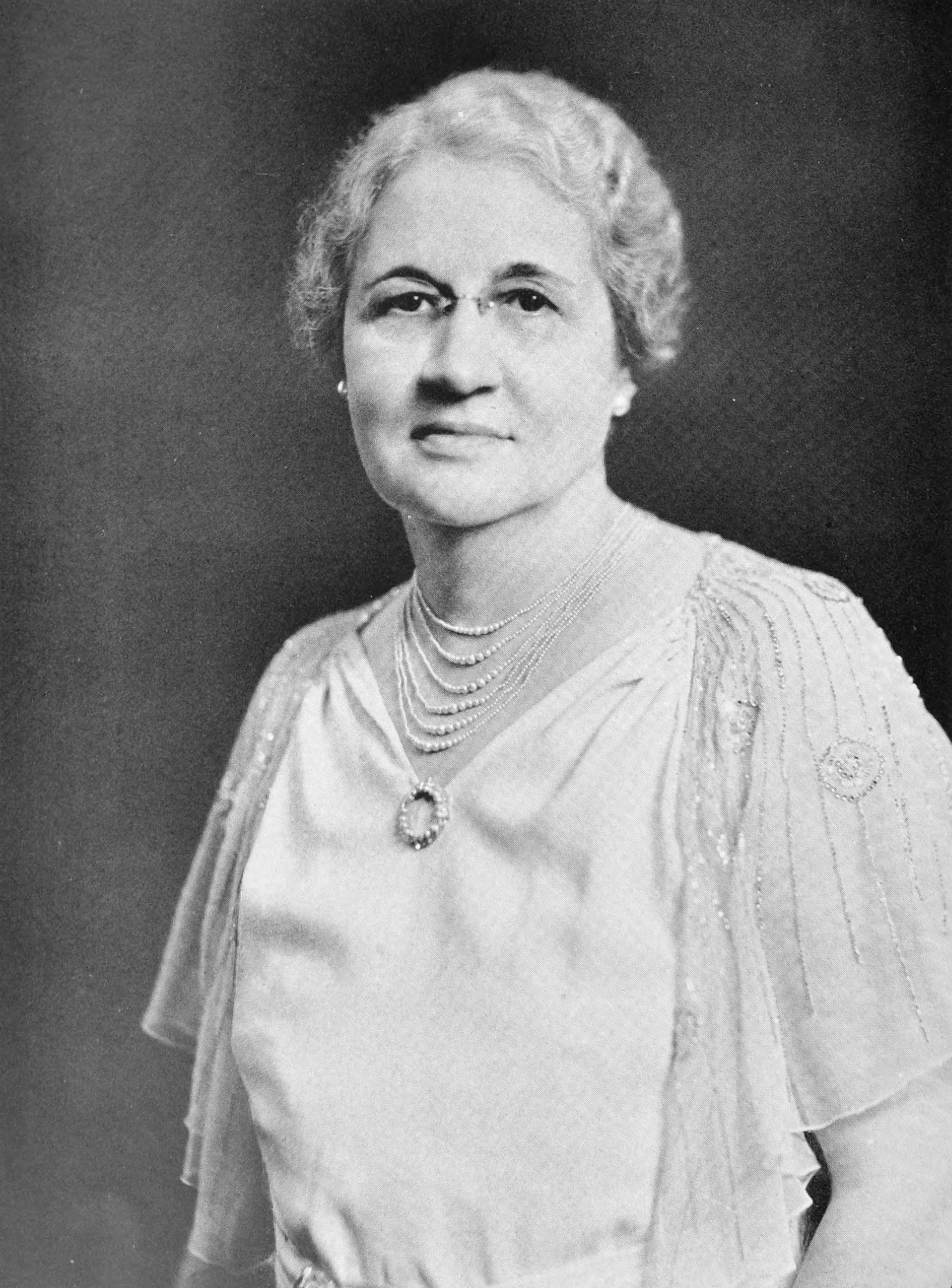
- Born: Lula Cordelia Dobbs; May 16, 1874; Cherokee County, Georgia; United States
- Died: April 24, 1949 (aged 74); Powder Springs, Georgia
- Resting place: McEachern Cemetery; Marietta, Georgia; United States
- Education: Young Harris College
- Occupation: Teacher
- Spouse: John Newton McEachern
- Parents: Rason Dobbs (father); Vesta (née DuPree) Dobbs (mother)

Lula Dobbs McEachern (May 16, 1874 – April 24, 1949) was an American teacher and religious leader.

== Biography ==
Lula Cordelia Dobbs was born in Cherokee County on May 16, 1874 to farmers Rason and Vesta (née DuPree) Dobbs. As a child, McEachern was a member of the McBeth Literary Society, and she attended Young Harris College.

McEachern was a teacher in the Oregon area of Cobb County in her early 20s. She married fellow Cobb County native and Confederate veteran John Newton McEachern, a future Atlanta alderman, on September 30, 1896. They lived in the West End and had three children: Elizabeth Florine (Jul. 22, 1897), John Newton Jr. (Feb. 20, 1899), and Lula Christine (Jan. 30, 1901).

She was the president of the Atlanta Women's Club in 1916 and 1917. During this time she advocated for "a housing law that will insure every citizen the chance to live in a place of physical and moral safety."

McEachern and her husband both attended Ebenezer Methodist-Episcopal Church, South. She served as the president of Ebenezer's missionary society and later was elected to the board of the North Georgia Conference of the United Methodist Church's Women's Missionary Society, where she established a summer camp for children. McEachern was the first woman to be vice-president of the International Council of Religious Education.

After John McEachern died on December 6, 1928, the church decided to construct a new building in his honor — the John N. McEachern Memorial Methodist Church, which was dedicated on June 5, 1932.

McEachern also became the chairman of the board of the Life Insurance Company of Georgia, from second vice-president since 1924, after John McEachern's death. She served in the role until 1948 with a hiatus in 1933. Within the company, she was known as "Miss Lula".

She also served on an advisory committee for the Candler School of Theology at Emory University, and was a member of the board of trustees of the UMC-affiliated Clark University. From 1926 to 1930, McEachern was a member of the Commission on Interracial Cooperation. During World War II, she worked with the American Red Cross. In 1936, she was named president of the National Council of Federated Church Women; that summer she visited religious leaders across seven countries. McEachern was head of the Atlanta Community Chest's women's division in 1938. She was also a member of the United Daughters of the Confederacy.

McEachern died on April 24, 1949 aged 74. She established in her will the McEachern Trust Fund at McEachern Memorial, giving the church $4,000 per year. Another plot of land she donated became McEachern High School.

In 2002, McEachern was inducted into the Georgia Women of Achievement.
