= Landon Addison Thomas =

American politician

- Born: October 31, 1799; Frankfort, Kentucky, United States
- Died: October 2, 1889 (aged 89); Frankfort, Kentucky, United States
- Resting place: Frankfort Cemetery
- Education: Yale College
- Relatives: Emily Harvie Thomas Tubman (sister)

Landon Addison Thomas (October 31, 1799 – October 2, 1889) was an American politician.

Thomas was born in Frankfort, Kentucky, on October 31, 1799, the son of Edmund and Ann (Chiles) Thomas, who removed from Virginia to Kentucky in 1796. After graduation from Yale College in 1822, he returned to Frankfort and studied law in the office of the Hon. Solomon P. Sharp. He was admitted to the bar but never engaged in practice. Soon after completing his law studies he made an extended European tour. Subsequently, he was engaged in the dry-goods business in Frankfort for several years in partnership with his uncle, and he continued to be identified until his death with the city's business interests.. He accumulated a very large fortune and around 1840 built a large Federal style home at 312 Washington Street that exists today as a funeral home. He had no taste for political life. Still, he was induced on one occasion, 1847, to serve as representative for his county in the Kentucky Legislature. He was married, May 26, 1858, to Ellen M. Polk, of Shelby County, Ky., who survived him with two sons and two daughters,—another son having died in infancy. He died at his home in Frankfort, on October 2, 1889, after six weeks' illness, having nearly completed his 90th year. His mind was clear to the last.

This article incorporates public domain material from the 1890 Yale Obituary Record.
