= Katie Hall Underwood =

Sapelo midwife (b. 1884, d. 1977)

- Born: January 8, 1884; Sapelo Island, Georgia, U.S.
- Died: February 7, 1977 (aged 93)
- Occupation: Midwife

Katie Hall Underwood (1884-1977) was a Sapelo midwife who was responsible for bringing generations of Gullah-Geechee people into the world. She was a daughter of freed slaves and was extremely dedicated to her work.

== Early life ==
Underwood was born in 1884 on Sapelo Island to freed slaves. The island had previously been owned by a plantation owner. Once the end of the Civil War was reached, freed slaves settled on the island. Underwood received little formal education. She learned about birthing babies from previous generations.

== Career ==
Underwood delivered her first baby in the early 1920s and continued this career until 1968. She carried a black bag with her that contained everything she needed for a birth such as medicines, natural remedies, and also a small notebook in which she wrote down the names of each baby that she delivered. She ate a meal with each family she helped and taught new mothers how to nurse and care for their infants. She was known for her commitment and often made visits to check in on the families she helped. She more often than not left her home before sunrise and returned after sunset. She would walk miles in one day to help others and for that she was highly respected within her community.

== Honors and recognition ==
In 2016, Underwood was inducted into the Georgia Women of Achievement Hall of Fame. In 2006, the Georgia Department of Natural Resources dedicated the new Sapelo Island ferry in her honor. This was the first time that a Department of Natural Resources vessel was named after an island descendant. Underwood was the midwife to important people in many different professions such as engineers, biologists, medical professionals, etc. Some of her own children still reside on Sapelo Island. Her memory connects many different people.
