= Clarice Cross Bagwell =

American educator and activist (1914–2001)

- Born: December 15, 1914; Pickens County, Georgia, U.S.
- Died: September 26, 2001 (aged 86); Cumming, Georgia, U.S.
- Resting place: Cherokee Memorial Park; Canton, Georgia
- Education: Georgia State University; University of Georgia; West Georgia College
- Occupation: Teacher

Clarice Cross Bagwell (December 15, 1914 – September 26, 2001) was an American educator and activist. She was the first woman in Georgia to serve as forewoman of a grand jury, (Note: The grand jury was empaneled in Cherokee County.) as well as one of the first special education teachers in the state of Georgia and the first in DeKalb County. She studied at Georgia State University, the University of Georgia, and West Georgia College. Bagwell also was president of the Georgia Parent Teacher Association and sat on the board of directors of the national PTA. Working for the PTA's Committee on International Relations, she visited Canada, Japan, Switzerland, and the USSR on goodwill and outreach missions.

Bagwell was born on December 15, 1914, in Pickens County, Georgia. She married chemist and teacher Leland Horace Bagwell, (Note: Born 18 September 1913; died 1 October 1972.) sometime after 1930. They had two children, David Leland Bagwell (Note: Born 8 February 1943, died 18 May 1967.) and Thomas Nathan Bagwell. Leland was the founder and CEO of American Proteins, founded in 1949 as the North Georgia Rendering Company; after his death in 1972 she became the company's chairman of the board and co-owner and ran it alongside their son, Tommy Bagwell. American Proteins would become the largest poultry renderer in the country before being purchased by Tyson Foods in 2018 for $850 million. Bagwell never took a salary for her work.

Despite not being an alumna, Bagwell was a strong supporter of Kennesaw State University, where she served as a trustee for 18 years, was in charge of the KSU Foundation's Special Projects Committee, and in 1997 received the first honorary doctorate of humane letters bestowed by the school. In 1996, the Bagwell family-owned American Proteins donated $2 million worth of land, 680 acres (280 ha) in Bartow County, to the KSU Foundation, its largest gift at the time; the university's Bagwell College of Education (Note: Formally the Leland H. and Clarice C. Bagwell College of Education.) is named in both her and her husband's honor, and the KSU Foundation's Bagwell Medal for Distinguished Service, established in 1991, is named after Clarice.

Additionally, Bagwell was a charter member of the Georgia Conservancy, the Georgia Federation of Business, and the Professional Women's Club; was appointed by three governors to Georgia's State Crimes Commission; initiated Cherokee County's first roadside park program along SR 20; and served as president of the Georgia Legislative Forum and a chairperson on the National Council on Crime and Delinquency.

Bagwell received commendations from the American Cancer Society, the Community Concert Association, and the Heart Association. In March 2020, Bagwell was added to the Georgia Women of Achievement Hall of Fame.

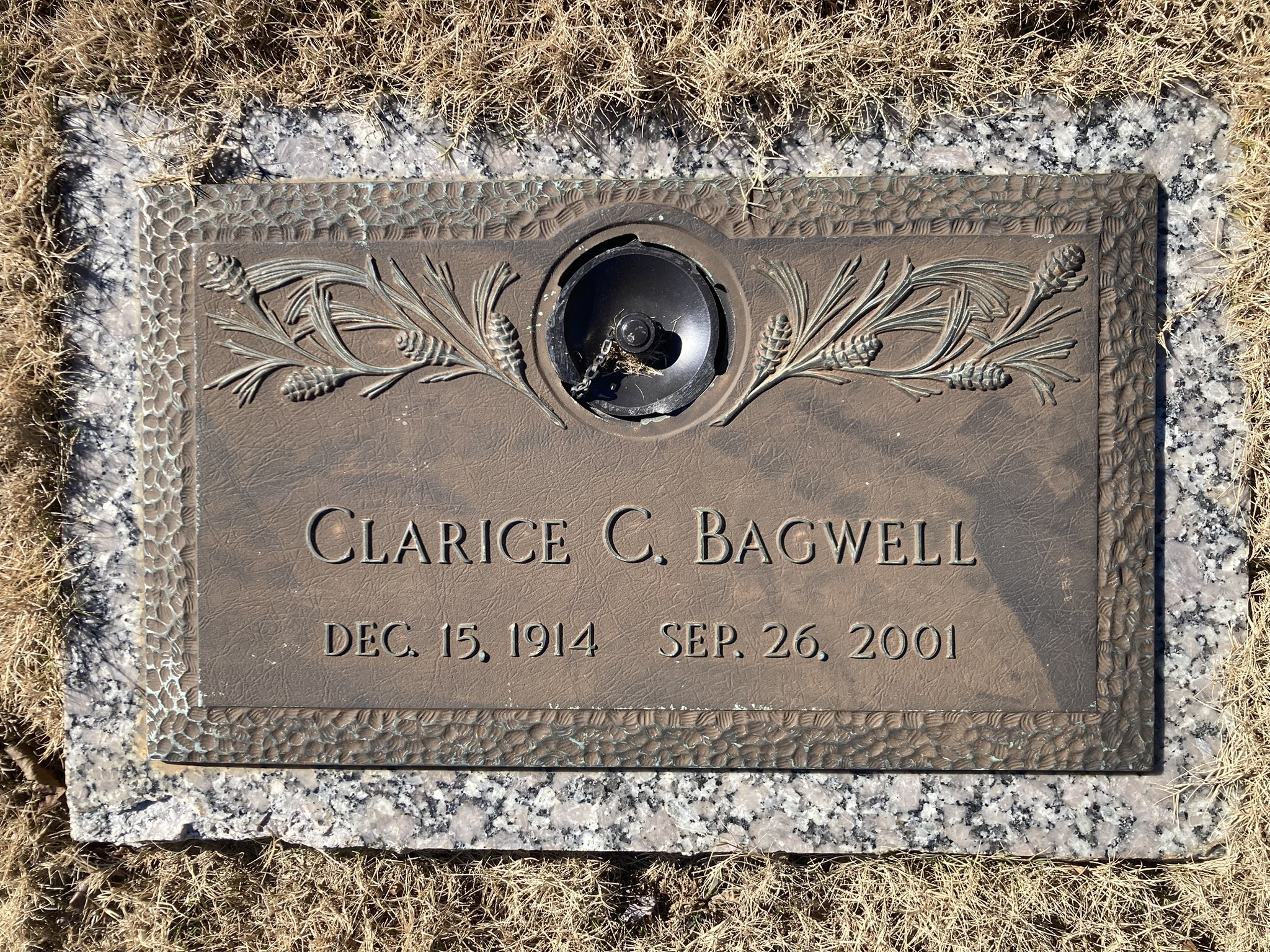
Bagwell's headstone in Canton, Georgia

Bagwell died on September 26, 2001, in Cumming, Georgia, at the age of 86.
