= Catherine Evans Whitener =

American textile artisan (1880–1964)

- Born: August 10, 1880; Walker County, Georgia
- Died: June 2, 1964; Whitfield County, Georgia
- Parents: William R. Evans (father); Nancy A. Nuckolls (mother)

Catherine Evans Whitener (August 10, 1880 – June 2, 1964) was a rural artisan credited with reviving and expanding the tufted textile industry in northwest Georgia. In 2001 she was named a Georgia Woman of Achievement.

== Early life ==
Catherine Evans Whitener was born on August 10, 1880, in Walker County, Georgia, to William R. Evans and Nancy A. Nuckolls. She was the second of seven children. She stopped going to school after fifth grade, a common practice for rural Georgia girls in the late nineteenth century. At the age of 12, while on a visit to her cousin, Whitener saw a tufted quilt, and became interested in the unique style. She practiced the technique known as tufting, and mastered the craft at the young age of 15. The very first quilt she made was a gift for her brother's wedding. Her relatives took notice of her craft, and she began to sell her works to them. This became the start of a booming industry.

== Career ==
Whitener's business soon evolved from hand sewn quilts, to machine made carpets. She operated the business from her home and hired women neighbors to help her keep up with demand. By 1900, Whitener was selling her bedspreads for $2.50. Her sales were so successful that other people began joining the industry. As the industry grew, thousands of the hand-tufted bedspreads and carpets were sold, and with the help of her family Whitener opened the Evans Manufacturing Company in 1917. Other women were inspired by Whitener's ingenuity, and soon textile companies were opening all across Georgia.

== Legacy ==
Whitener's tufting industry eventually expanded to include bath mats, accent rugs, and carpets. Her carpets were especially successful, and her techniques were lasting. Today, over 90 percent of carpets produced in the U.S. today are tufted using Whitener's early techniques. She never had the chance to make millions off the industry, however, many Georgia men and women did in later days. Dalton, Georgia, prior to the Silicon Valley boom, was the city with the most millionaires per capita in the United States; all part of Whitener's legacy. Dalton became known as the "Carpet Capital of the World," and in the 1990s, 90 percent of the world's carpets were being produced in or around this small city.
