= Edith Lenora Foster =

- Born: March 6, 1906; Carrolton, GA
- Died: August 18, 1996 (aged 90)
- Resting place: Carrolton, GA
- Known for: Public librarianship

Edith Lenora Foster (March 6, 1906 – August 18, 1996) was an American librarian, educator, historian, and author who played a pivotal role in the development of rural library systems in Georgia. Foster worked as an English teacher before earning a master’s degree in Librarianship from Emory University in 1944. She founded the multi-county West Georgia Regional Library System which later became a national model.

Foster was a pioneer in mobile library services, designing west Georgia’s first bookmobile in 1946. Over her 32-year tenure as director, she expanded the system to include eight branches and over 190,000 volumes. She authored poetry, local histories, and professional manuals, and contributed to newspapers and journals. Foster received numerous accolades, including recognition from United States president Gerald Ford. She was inducted into the Georgia Women of Achievement in 2007.

== Early life and education ==
Foster was born in Carrollton, Georgia. Her mother was a school teacher and her father was a doctor. She was 12 when her father died of pneumonia.

Her connection to public libraries began during childhood, when she often visited the small library located in Carrollton City Hall. The library closed in the 1920s following the death of its caretaker, Lula Baskin. During the New Deal era, the federal government offered funding to help communities restore public libraries through the Works Progress Administration (WPA). In Carrollton, state officials reached out to Foster’s mother, then principal of Cowley Street School, to lead the effort. She accepted and spent the summer organizing and reopening the public library with WPA support.

Foster attended LaGrange College and graduated with honors in 1926.

== Career ==
=== Early career ===
After graduation from LaGrange College, Foster pursued a career in education as an English teacher. She went on to lead the English departments of schools across Alabama and Georgia. She was the head of the English department at Gordon Lee Memorial High School in Chickamauga and was planning to pursue a career in writing or a teaching fellowship at the University of Alabama, when she was approached by Tommie Dora Barker, dean of the Emory University Library School, who encouraged her to join the new state-sponsored librarian training program. Initially hesitant, Foster agreed on the condition that she be officially released from her teaching contract. After weeks of negotiation and intervention from the state government, her release was granted, and she accepted the scholarship to study library science at Emory University.

Foster conceptualized the formation of a two-county regional library to serve Carroll and Heard counties. Her vision aligned with the evolving philosophy that public libraries should function as educational institutions. Along with fellow students Margaret Woodall and Bert Ivester, she was selected for specialized training and outreach, attending education-focused conferences. During one of the conferences, she was introduced to the acting school superintendent of Heard County, who expressed interest in Foster’s ideas. He, along with West Georgia College president Irvine S. Ingram, pledged support for Foster’s plan to return to Carrollton and launch a regional system.

Foster wrote her thesis on setting up and operating a regional library, although much of her knowledge at the time was theoretical. To support her efforts, she collaborated with her cousin, George Carey Smith of West Georgia College, who coordinated a community survey through his third-year education students. The survey revealed that the only viable locations for public library outreach in rural areas were churches and schools, but due to denominational diversity and irregular meeting schedules, churches were deemed impractical.

At the time, elementary schools in rural Georgia lacked libraries entirely, and the only funding available for school libraries was $10 per teacher through a limited state allocation—an amount insufficient for meaningful development. Recognizing both the need for centralized public spaces and the opportunity to improve public education, Foster committed to partnering directly with local schools. With support from county superintendents, Foster conducted extensive community outreach, presenting her library plans to educators, civic groups, religious organizations, and agricultural associations. She tailored her message to rural audiences, emphasizing that with local support, the region could develop a centralized headquarters, branch libraries, and a robust collection.

Foster’s early efforts to establish the West Georgia Regional Library System were supported by key local leaders and funding from both the state and private sources. The program’s total starting budget was $10,000, which Foster used a portion of to purchase approximately 5,000 books. She also secured an additional 1,000 books on loan from the Georgia Department of Education’s Library Division, which had absorbed the Georgia Library Commission in 1943. This structural change placed public library oversight under the Department of Education, allowing libraries to share in educational funding that contributed to the long-term growth of Georgia's public library system. These books were primarily distributed to Foster by mail from the state library in Atlanta, but Foster occasionally drove to retrieve high-demand items. She also initiated interlibrary loans with institutions such as Emory University, Georgia Tech, and the University of Georgia to fulfill specific needs.

Foster’s amassed collection was stored in the basement of West Georgia College’s library, serving as the West Georgia Regional Library System’s temporary headquarters. To support community outreach and distribute books, Foster borrowed vehicles from the college’s car pool began establishing library "deposits"—small collections placed in accessible locations—across Carroll and Heard counties. These included rural post offices, country stores, and private homes.

=== Developing Georgia's first mobile library service ===
After Haralson County officially joined the regional system in 1946, Foster proposed launching Georgia’s first mobile library service by converting a station wagon into a bookmobile. With support from Ingram and local businessman Pump Shaffer, she worked with builder J.B. Stallings to retrofit it with flush-mounted shelves, storage compartments, and a stool for patrons. Picture books and specialized materials were stored in slide-out boxes for both safety and ease of access.

Foster worked closely with school principals and teachers to introduce the mobile library and explain how it could support classroom learning. She established pupil clubs in each participating school to assist with unloading books, tracking requests, and relaying information. At the time, many rural teachers were purchasing books on their own without any cataloging system; Foster’s program provided centralized, organized access to educational materials, ensuring reliable, professional support for underserved classrooms.

As the demand for the mobile library service grew, a second custom-designed bookmobile was commissioned in 1950 and built by Gerstenslager to further expand the service.

=== Expansion of the West Georgia Regional Library System ===
In 1950, Douglas County began establishing its own public library without consulting the Georgia Department of Education. Although the state typically allowed counties to operate independently at the time, it asked Edith Foster to intervene due to concerns over long-term sustainability.

Foster met with Douglas County leaders, including state officials and local stakeholders, and quickly identified political divisions, including tension between urban and rural interests. Recognizing the timing wasn’t right, she encouraged the county to continue its efforts while staying open to future regional collaboration, a move praised by the state for preserving relationships. By late 1951, the chairman of the county library board reached out to Foster, acknowledging the difficulties of managing the library alone, and agreed to have Douglas County join the West Georgia Regional Library System. Foster advised relocating the county’s main library facility from an upstairs space to a more accessible location in the county courthouse, which was done.

To build local support for the merger, Foster organized a spring bookmobile tour using a state vehicle and high-quality materials, partnering with Ruth Warren, a former English teacher and future county librarian. Together, they introduced library services across Douglas County and laid the groundwork for its formal integration that fall.

By 1958, the regional library had outgrown its shared space in the West Georgia College library basement, and that same year, Governor Marvin Griffin allocated funds to expand the college’s Sanford Library and build a new dormitory, prompting the need for relocation. With support from library board chairman Hubert Griffin, Foster began the search for a new facility.

A small duplex on Maple Street was acquired at auction for $10,200, with assistance from local banking executive Anna McGukin. Though modest and lacking basic amenities, Foster used $2,000 in savings to begin equipping the space. The library board approved additional borrowing, and the state building authority deemed the building structurally sound. The total investment reached approximately $35,000, which Foster repaid over five years through savings and grassroots fundraising.

Paulding County also joined the West Georgia Regional Library system in 1958. Concurrently, the Carrollton Library Board voted unanimously to dissolve its city-operated library and merge with the regional system under Foster’s leadership. Foster had anticipated this and had curated a collection that served both city and regional needs. Partnerships continued to grow, including a collaboration with the Carrollton Garden Club to build a regional gardening collection.

To secure long-term funding, Foster led a successful tax support campaign. In Carroll County, the Kiwanis Club helped organize a petition drive, while in Heard County, the local tax commissioner ensured shared financial backing from the outset. Foster’s countywide petition efforts drew thousands of signatures, and when she and Kiwanis leaders presented the petition to the Carroll County Commission, the first dedicated library tax allocation was approved in just 15 minutes. Although two regional libraries already existed in Athens and LaFayette, neither received tax support, making Foster’s program one of the first practical demonstrations of a publicly funded rural library network in Georgia. This milestone established a stable, tax-supported funding model that has sustained the library system ever since.

Soon after relocating operations to Maple Street, Foster was approached by community members in Tallapoosa, including the mayor’s wife, who expressed interest in establishing a local public library. Foster clarified that while the regional board could provide materials and planning support, construction responsibilities rested with the local community; however, she agreed to assist with materials, book selection, and planning support.

Momentum for the project grew when Dixie Steel, an affiliate of Allied Steel Corporation, offered to donate the steel for the building. The Georgia Department of Education approved the project as an innovative pilot, and the Atlanta Public Library expressed interest in studying the model for potential branch use.

A local planning committee was formed, and initial funding included a $3,000 donation from the Daughters of the Confederacy. Local businessman William Lomason contributed $100,000 to help meet the local funding requirements needed to secure two federal building grants. Financial management remained local, under the oversight of the regional board. The resulting structure, clad in moss-green steel with Lauan mahogany interior walls, was the first public library in the U.S. built with a steel exterior. Southern Desk supplied high-quality oak furniture at a significantly reduced cost, and the layout included an office and restroom. Thus, the Tallapoosa Public Library became the first official branch of the West Georgia Regional Library System in 1963.

Planning for the Neva Lomason Memorial Library in Carrollton began in the mid-1960s, following the passage of the Appalachian Regional Development Act of 1965. With funding made available through Governor Carl Sanders, Foster initiated the project after confirming local support from Mayor John Robinson. She authored the building program, detailing space, services, and architectural requirements.

New federal provisions under the Library Services and Construction Act allowed matching of Appalachian development funds with other federal sources, reducing Carrollton’s local funding requirement to one-third. Major funding came from William Lomason through a donation of stock, sold at peak value to raise over $100,000. The library was completed in December 1967 and named in honor of Mr. Lomason’s daughter Neva Lomason in recognition of the family's contributions to the development of the system's libraries.

=== Creating school libraries and teacher training programs ===
As the West Georgia Regional Library system expanded, Edith Foster and her staff became increasingly overextended. She eventually began discussions with state library consultants about the possibility of elementary school libraries becoming standard in Georgia. Encouraged by their belief that such changes were imminent, Foster sought permission to initiate a preparatory effort. She approached school superintendents and principals with a plan to consolidate scattered classroom book collections into a central location within each school. Her proposal emphasized that the existing materials would remain accessible to students but would be organized and cataloged to improve access. Volunteer teachers would oversee the collections, supported by Foster’s staff, who would help process the materials and provide basic cataloging.

Recognizing the need for basic training for volunteer teachers, Foster proposed that they commute to West Georgia College for coursework. Foster approached Dr. Ingram at West Georgia College with a proposal to establish a library training course for teachers. Ingram secured approval from the Board of Regents, contingent on Foster teaching the course herself. She agreed, provided it was offered as a night class, and began teaching the course in 1957. Foster also helped design the course curriculum in alignment with state and national library standards; it taught practical skills such as book processing, mending, and organizing a school library in relation to classroom instruction.

The course continued to develop into a state-approved Library Science program, with course credits applicable toward either library science or education degrees. After five years, Foster declined to continue teaching, citing her responsibilities in library development. Her successor, Dr. James Boyd, supported the program’s continuation.

=== Integration of library services ===
Edith Foster actively pursued the expansion of library services to Black communities across the West Georgia region during the era of segregation and early integration. Aware of the disparities in access and anticipating potential resistance, Foster took a proactive and transparent approach. She worked closely with local Black educators, including Jeanes Supervisors, who had long operated with limited resources, and unofficially lent them books.

Foster also strived to create a library within the city of Carrollton to support the city’s local Black community. When meeting with Black community leaders, she assured them that their library materials would be equal in quality to those provided to white patrons.

With assistance from a local contact, Foster obtained a surplus military telephone exchange building from Fort Oglethorpe for one dollar. Black veterans volunteered to dismantle and transport the structure to Carrollton. Foster secured a parcel of city land on King Street for the building, but was disheartened by the poor condition of the structure. Local Black leaders reassured her, pledging to raise funds and renovate the facility.

A formal fundraising campaign was organized through community-based leadership. Chairpersons were appointed for each Black neighborhood, and donations were collected from both Black residents and their white allies. Foster regularly met with organizers at Moore’s Chapel and personally attended fundraising sessions. Ultimately, the community raised enough money to improve the facility, which included new siding, flooring, windows, and a portico entrance; by 1951, the library was fully renovated.

To formally staff the King Street branch, Foster approached the new Black education supervisor, Lillian Price, for candidate recommendations. Price identified social science teacher Leroy Childs as the ideal choice, and Foster ultimately recruited him for his strong communication skills and passion for supporting the local community. Childs later advanced to become Director of the West Georgia Regional Library, Sixth District Representative to the Georgia Library Association in Washington, D.C., and a member of the State School Superintendent's Advisory Committee.

Foster’s efforts also gained state and national recognition. When the national Delta Sigma Theta sorority at Howard University initiated a contest to identify the best Southern library serving Black communities, the West Georgia Regional Library was selected. Foster was informed she would receive a dedicated bookmobile for the Black library program. The bookmobile could hold 1,800 books and up to eight people. It was used to organize and expand Black library services throughout the region.

To address anticipated concerns over integration, Foster consulted with state officials, who advised marking books intended for Black readers with a triangle symbol. This strategy allowed Foster to respond to criticism while continuing to provide equitable access. Despite only one recorded objection from a prominent white citizen, Foster received no formal resistance and successfully implemented the program without disruption.

== Awards and accolades ==
In 1953, Foster spoke at the American Library Association’s (ALA) national conference. During the 1950s, she served as President of the Adult Education Section of the ALA’s Public Library Association. She was appointed Director Emeritus of the West Georgia Regional Library System in 1977.

In 1970, Foster was awarded the Governor’s Award in the Humanities. She received recognition from President Gerald Ford in 1974. She wrote a section of the ALA Manual for Librarians titled "Library in the Small Community" about the steps for establishing a rural library. She also wrote books of poetry, local history, and an autobiography titled Yonder She Comes! A Once Told Lib'ry Tale.

By the time of her retirement in 1976, Foster had grown the West Georgia Regional Library System to include eight branches, 72 deposit centers, and a collection of 190,000 volumes.

== Death and legacy ==
Edith Foster died in 1996 at age 90.
