= Emily Harvie Thomas Tubman =

American philanthropist

- Born: March 21, 1794; Ashland, Virginia, United States
- Died: June 9, 1885 (aged 91)
- Resting place: Frankfort Cemetery
- Relatives: Landon Addison Thomas (brother)

Emily Harvie Thomas Tubman (March 21, 1794 – June 9, 1885) was an American philanthropist. Born in Virginia, she became a prominent socialite and businesswoman in Augusta, Georgia, and was an early supporter of the Christian Church (Disciples of Christ).

== Early life and career ==
Emily Harvie Thomas was born on March 21, 1794, in Ashland, Virginia, to Edmund Thomas and Anne Thomas. In 1798, her family moved to Kentucky as her father became registrar of the Kentucky Land Office. Her brother Landon Addison Thomas was born the next year. She spent much of her childhood in Frankfort, Kentucky. In 1804, her father died, and Henry Clay, a friend of the family, became her legal guardian. In 1818, she moved to Augusta, Georgia, to spend the winter with the Nicholas Ware family. Later that year, she married Richard Tubman, an Englishman from Maryland with extensive landholdings in Georgia. Due to fears of contracting yellow fever, Emily would spend her summers in Frankfort for the rest of her life. Richard died in 1836, leaving Emily in charge of the large estate and extensive properties. Following this, her brother, who had graduated from Yale College, educated her in the basics of civil law.

As part of Richard's will, he had left a $10,000 gift to the University of Georgia on the condition that the Georgia legislature allowed for his slaves to be freed. However, as the legislature refused to allow this, the gift was not made, and instead Emily became involved with the American Colonization Society's efforts to relocate free African Americans to Africa. Emily offered the 144 slaves that had belonged to Richard the opportunity to relocate to Liberia, with 69 accepting the offer. Emily covered the $6,000 cost for relocation. A town in Maryland County, Liberia was named Tubman in her honor, and William Tubman, the grandson of two of her former slaves, served as the 19th president of Liberia during the 20th century.

Tubman had become a member of the Restoration Movement following her interest in the teachings of Alexander Campbell, one of the movement's prominent leaders. She donated the building that housed First Christian Church in Augusta, which had been established in 1835. In 1874, she donated new buildings as part of the church's relocation within the city, and several years earlier in 1870 she spent $26,000 in repairing the First Christian Church in Frankfort, which had suffered a fire that destroyed the building. Among her other philanthropic activities with the Disciples of Christ, she established an endowment for Bethany College, which had been established by Campbell in 1840, and donated to Kentucky University. She also donated $30,000 to the Foreign Christian Missionary Society, the largest donation the society had seen at that time.

Among her other business ventures, she was a shareholder of the Georgia Railroad and owned many stocks in a manufacturing company by John Pendleton King. In 1874, she endowed Tubman High School in Augusta. Today, a middle school in the city bears her name.

== Death and legacy ==
Tubman died on June 9, 1885. She was buried next to her brother Landon in her family's lot at Frankfort Cemetery in Frankfort. In 1994, Tubman was inducted into the Georgia Women of Achievement. That same year, the city of Augusta unveiled a statue of Tubman near First Christian Church.
