= Rebecca Stiles Taylor =

American journalist, social worker, and educator

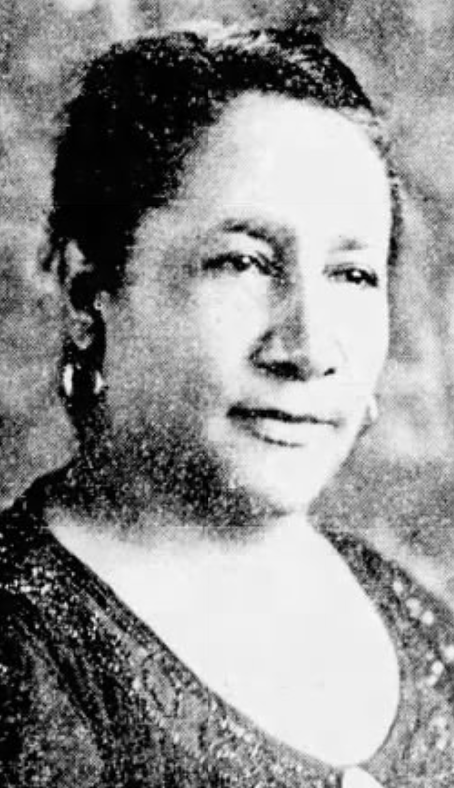
- Rebecca Stiles Taylor, from a 1927 newspaper
- Born: August 1879; Savannah, Georgia, U.S.
- Died: December 1958 (aged 79)
- Education: Atlanta University
- Occupations: Journalist, teacher, social worker

Rebecca Stiles Taylor (August 1879 – December 1958) was a journalist, social worker, and educator from Savannah, Georgia. She was best known for her contributions to the community as the founder of several charitable outlets in the area and as an activist for women's and civil rights.

== Early life ==
Taylor received a considerable education, graduating from the Beach Institute and Atlanta University, and later attending Hampton Institute and Columbia University. She started her journalistic work as a columnist for a local Savannah newspaper, where she was not afraid to speak out against the tense racial issues of the era. After many years of segregated schooling, the education she received at Atlanta University, a less racially biased institution of the time, was instrumental in her career and set her on the course for social activism. A cousin of Stiles Taylor described the influence the university had on her:

They picked up the mission to educate everyone of color. They gave them a mission, almost like a preacher in the pulpit or a missionary on his ship going to a foreign shore. They were to go back. They were to cleanse, protect, and educate the lesser of all the children in their cities and communities.

— Hugh Golson, Forgotten Women Part 7: Rebecca Stiles Taylor

== Career ==
From writer to teacher to social activist, Taylor was one of very few women journalists for the Chicago Defender and her writing contributions led her to be nationally recognized. She often wrote on controversial topics such as racial segregation. In columns about racial interactions and political affairs, she often referenced other accomplished writers like Corbett Ashby. Taylor also wrote a weekly column, "Activities of Women's National Organizations", during the war time in order to keep readers up to date about women's organizations across the country. In addition to race relations, Taylor also spoke our for women's issues by writing in support of sound and equal marriages and the elevation of the negro woman. Beyond her writings, Taylor is lauded for her efforts to make positive social change in matters of education, civil rights and public health.

In 1917, she founded the Toussaint L'Ouverture Branch of the American Red Cross. Additionally, Taylor served as national leader of the National Association of Colored Women Mary McLeod Bethune's "chief aide." Furthermore, she led the Savannah Chapter of the National Association of Colored Women's Club, which provided the means to open a nursing home, a home for girls, and two free health clinics. She joined Mary McLeod Bethune to organize the entire Southeastern Region of the club in 1919, assuming the position of corresponding secretary and president of the Association's Georgia State Federation. Taylor was passionate and active about the wellbeing of people in her community, and the nation as a whole. Earlier in her career, Taylor devoted much time to educating people in Savannah with limited opportunities. She achieved great success in these efforts. She was also the first African-American woman to become Savannah's Probation Officer in Juvenile Court. Additionally, she wrote a letter to President Woodrow Wilson in reaction to a lynching. She cared deeply about reconciling racial divides and took her concerns to people of highest authority in an effort to make a change. Taylor's lifelong career of dedication to the social, mental, and physical betterment of all people has led her into national recognition.

== Legacy ==
Taylor inspired many with her willingness to take action towards furthering her social causes during a time when it was somewhat taboo to do so. She had a radical vision of social improvement for her time, saying that the South was "on the threshold of a new era," and she dedicated her life towards spurring that on in a vast range of outlets from high school education to club organization. Taylor was an integrationist and advocated an alliance between black women's organizations with other national women's organizations in order eliminate social tension and create a sustainable future. Drawing from her efforts, the Stiles Taylor family remains a prominent figure of charitable works to this day with many of her descendants serving as pastors, teachers, and charity group leaders in the Savannah community. To commemorate a lifetime of service and activism, Taylor was inducted into the Georgia Women of Achievement in 2014.
