= Mary Dorothy Lyndon =

- Born: 1877; Newnan, Georgia, U.S.
- Died: April 5, 1924 (aged 46–47); Washington, Georgia, U.S.

Academic background
- Education: Wesleyan College; Columbia University; University of Georgia

Mary Dorothy Lyndon (1877 – April 5, 1924) was the first female graduate from the University of Georgia (UGA) in Athens, Georgia.

== Early life and education ==
Lyndon was born in 1877 in Newnan, Georgia. She graduated from Wesleyan College in Macon, Georgia in 1896 as its first Dramatic Arts degree holder. She continued her education in Dramatic Arts and History at Columbia University in New York City before beginning her studies at the University of Georgia during Summer school sessions.

== UGA education, academic career ==
After earning sufficient credit, Lyndon received a Master of Arts degree on June 17, 1914 – four years before women were admitted to UGA as regular students. Upon her graduation, Lyndon taught English at Athens High School.

When women were finally admitted as full students during the 1919–1920 school year, Mary Lyndon was nominated by UGA Chancellor David C. Barrow and then elected by the University Board of Trustees to the positions of Associate Professor of Education and Dean of Women.

Lyndon taught classes in the Peabody School of Education, directed the Thalian Dramatic Club, helped organize the University chapter of the Phi Mu Sorority (the first sorority at UGA), and founded the Pioneer Club.

== Community service ==
Lyndon was active in the Athens community as the recording secretary for the Athens YMCA, secretary of the local Daughters of the American Revolution chapter, writer for the Athens Banner-Herald, and Sunday school teacher at the First Methodist Church of Athens.

== Death and legacy ==
On April 5, 1924, Lyndon died from pneumonia in Washington, Georgia. In 1936 Mary Lyndon Hall, initially a female residence hall on UGA's south campus, was named in her honor. She is one of two 2019 inductees to the Georgia Women of Achievement hall of fame.
