= Tubman High School =

- U.S. National Register of Historic Places
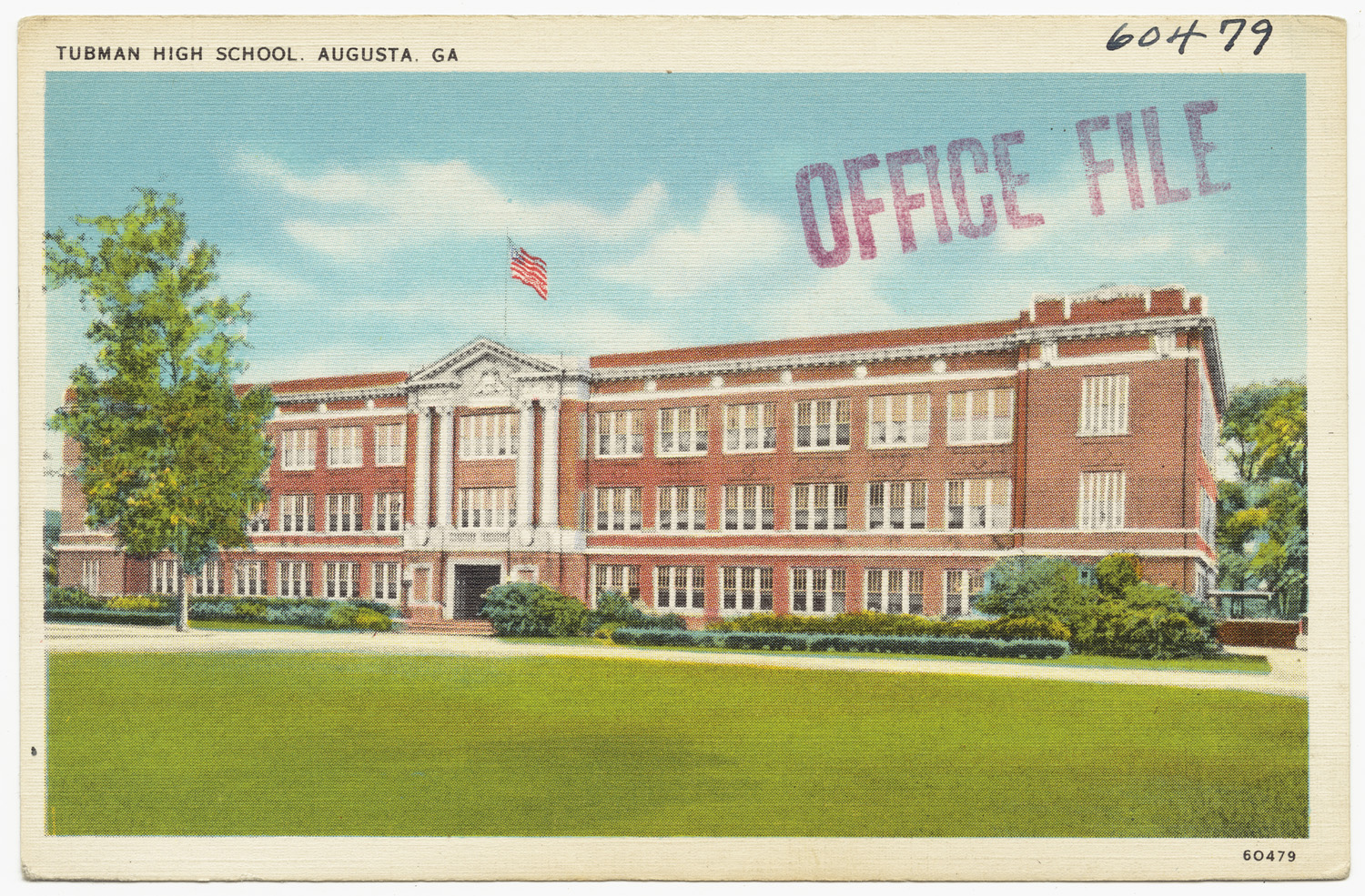

- Location within Georgia Location within the United States
- Location: 1740 Walton Way, Augusta, Georgia
- Coordinates: 33°28′25″N 81°59′51″W
- Area: 10 acres (4.0 ha)
- Built: 1917
- Built by: Palmer-Spivey Construction Co.
- Architect: Preacher, G. Lloyd
- Architectural style: Beaux Arts
- NRHP reference No.: 94000154
- Added to NRHP: March 7, 1994

Tubman High School is a historic high school building in Augusta, Georgia. It was added to the National Register of Historic Places on March 7, 1994. It is located at 1740 Walton Way. It was named for Augusta philanthropist Emily Harvie Thomas Tubman and was founded as Neely's Institute in 1874. A new Tubman High School building was funded by a bond issue and constructed in 1917 according to designs by G. Lloyd Preacher. The three-story brick building's design is considered Beaux Arts architecture and includes terra cotta. It was the area's only public high school for girls until the 1950s.

It became a co-educational junior high school in 1951 and is now a middle school.

== See also ==
- National Register of Historic Places listings in Richmond County, Georgia
