= Sarah Randolph Bailey =

American educator

- Born: 1885; Macon, Georgia
- Died: 1972 (aged 86–87)
- Occupations: Teacher, principal
- Organisation: Girl Scouts
- Awards: Thanks Badge

Sarah Randolph Bailey (1885–1972) was an American educator and Girl Scout pioneer. Born in Macon, Georgia, she started scouting troops for African-American girls which eventually earned admission to the state organization in Georgia and formal recognition from the national Girl Scouts organization in 1948.

== Biography ==
Bailey was born in Macon, Georgia in 1885, the daughter of freed slaves. She graduated as "first in her class" in 1901 and began teaching the same year. In 1909 she became principal of the Maryland M Burdell School in Macon. She continued to teach in Macon public schools through 1955.

In 1935, Bailey formed the Girl Reserves consisting of young African-American girls. The Girl Scouts organization in Georgia did not allow black girls membership until 1940. By 1937, 15 groups of Girl Reserves had formed within Macon. The Georgia-based Girl Scouts organization began to permit black troops in 1945 and invited Bailey to join. She also became chairwoman of the Central Committee for Macon's troops, and her troop was formally recognized by the national Girl Scout organization in 1948.

Bailey died in 1972.

== Honors and legacy ==
In recognition of her work as a troop leader and camp director, Bailey received the Thanks Badge, the highest honor able to be awarded to an adult in Scouting.

- In 1955, Bailey received an award for distinguished service from Fort Valley State University
- In 1961, Camp Sarah Bailey was dedicated in her honor
- In 2012, Bailey was recognized as a Georgia Woman of Achievement
