= Eliza Frances Andrews =

American writer, botanist, and teacher

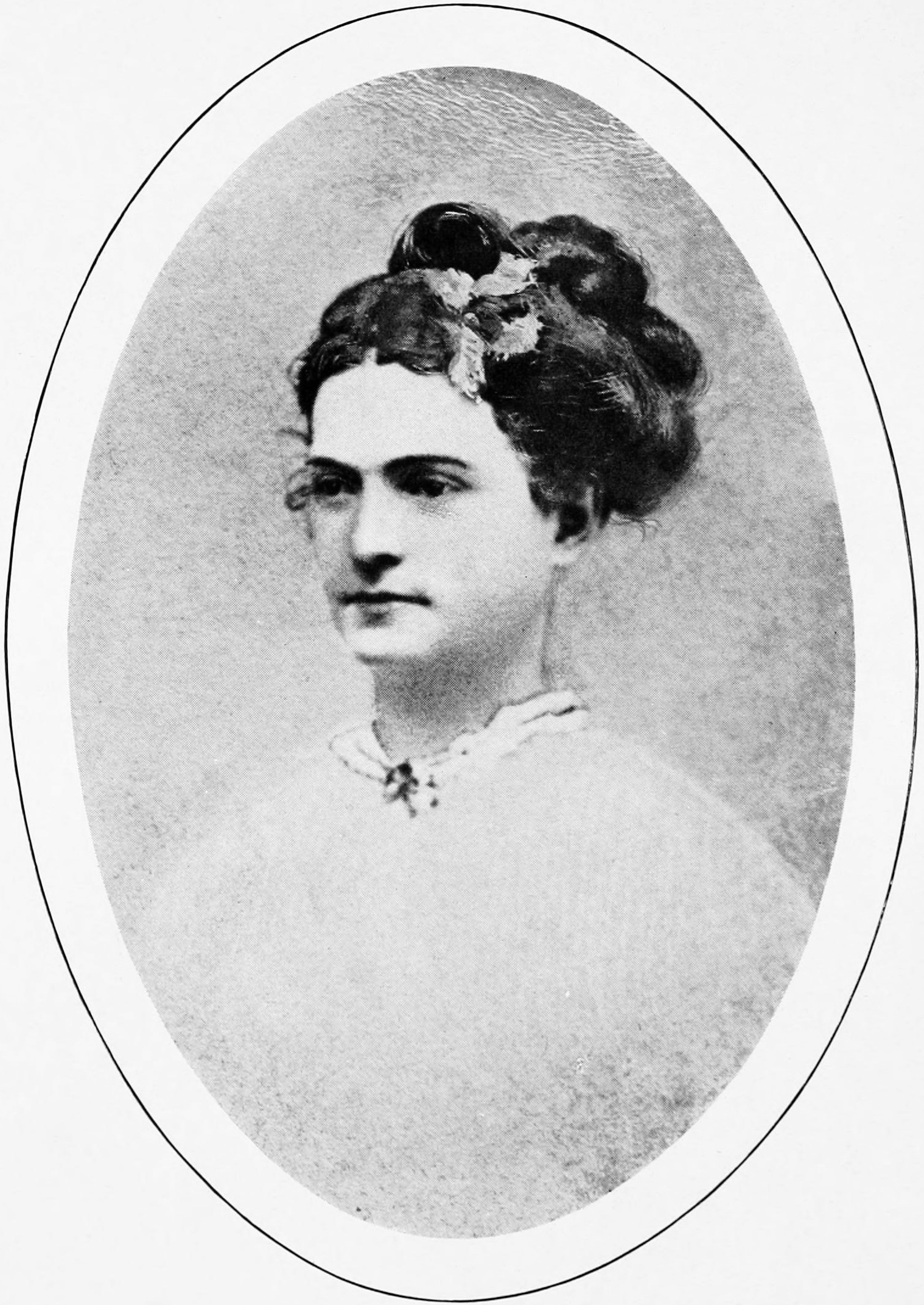
- Photograph of Andrews, 1865
- Born: August 10, 1840; Washington, Georgia, United States
- Died: January 21, 1931 (aged 90); Rome, Georgia, United States
- Parent(s): Garnett Andrews; Annulet Ball Andrews
- Writing career
- Notable works: A Family Secret (1876); A Mere Adventurer (1879); Wartime Journal of a Georgia Girl: 1864-65 (1908); Botany All the Year Round (1903); Practical Botany (1911)

Eliza Frances Andrews (August 10, 1840 - January 21, 1931) was a popular American writer of the Gilded Age. Her shorter works were published in popular magazines and papers, including the New York World and Godey's Lady's Book. Her longer works include The War-Time Journal of a Georgia Girl (1908) and two botany textbooks.

Andrews gained fame in the fields of literature, education, and science, and had success both as an essayist and a novelist. Financial difficulties led her to begin teaching after the deaths of her parents, though she continued to publish her writing. In her retirement, she published two textbooks on botany entitled Botany All the Year Round and Practical Botany, the latter of which became popular in Europe and was translated for schools in France.

== Biography ==
=== Early life ===
Eliza Frances "Fanny" Andrews was born on August 10, 1840, in Washington, Georgia, the second daughter of Annulet Ball and Garnett Andrews, a judge in Georgia's Superior Courts. Her father was a lawyer, judge, and plantation owner, possessing around two hundred enslaved people. Andrews grew up on the family estate, Haywood, the name of which she would later use in a pseudonym, "Elzey Hay". attended the local Ladies' Seminary school, and later graduated among the first class of students from LaGrange Female College in 1857. She was well-versed in literature, music, and the arts, and was conversant in both French and Latin. Upon graduating, Andrews returned home to live with her father. Around this time Southern states began to secede from the Union. Though her father was outspoken against secession, three of Andrews' brothers enlisted in the Confederate States Army. Andrews and her sisters also supported the Confederacy.

During the American Civil War, Andrews and her sister were sent to live with their older sister in southwest Georgia. Andrews recorded both her journey and stay in a journal that was later published under the title Wartime Journal of a Georgia Girl: 1864-65. Though not published until 1908, the diary effectively began her career as a writer. Later in 1865, at her father's suggestion, Andrews submitted "A Romance of Robbery," her first published piece, to the New York World. It described the treatment of southerners by the Reconstruction administrators who occupied the South after the end of the war. She wrote many articles for a variety of publications on topics such as women's fashion during the war, and a piece on Catherine Littlefield Greene, a noted supporter of Eli Whitney's cotton gin.

=== Teaching career ===
Garnett Andrews died in 1873, leaving his family in a difficult financial position. The family sold the plantation and that required Fanny Andrews to seek paid work. She briefly edited the Washington Gazette but when the editor discovered she was a woman, she was fired. She then became principal at the Girl's High School in Yazoo, Mississippi, where she remained for seven years. She resigned the position in the early 1880s in order to recuperate from a serious illness. Andrews then returned to Washington to become the principal at her former seminary school. She received an honorary Master of Arts degree from Wesleyan Female College in Macon, Georgia in 1882. In 1885 she moved to Macon, where she worked as a professor of French and literature from 1886 to 1896. She also worked as a school librarian during this time period. She returned once again to Washington and devoted herself full-time to lecturing and writing.

== Personal beliefs ==
=== Women in society ===
Andrews’ first novel, A Family Secret (1876), paints a vivid image of the role of women in the post war South. She remarks upon the misery inherent in marrying for money and writes at one point "Oh, the slavery it is to be a woman and not a fool." At the same time, she believed that the domestic wife and mother was the only acceptable role for women in Southern society, and she considered teaching "a mental tread-mill, a dull road traveled over and over requiring only patience." As she observed in the introduction to her Wartime Journal that “In the lifetime of a single generation the people of the South have been called upon to pass through changes that the rest of the world has taken centuries to accomplish”

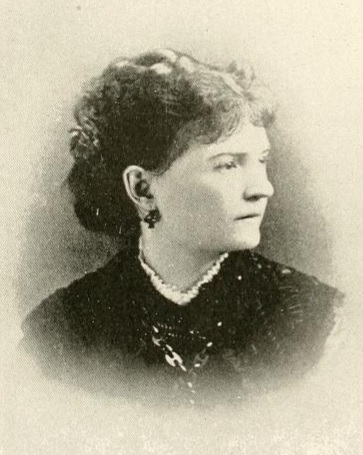
Andrews in 1897

=== Post civil-war ===
The influences of the antebellum and wartime South, which Andrews describes as a "unique society," are evident in her work throughout her life. Between the Confederate surrender in April 1865 and the end of the 1860s, Andrews wrote for several local and national magazines and newspapers, including the New York World and Scott's Monthly, providing commentary on issues the South faced during the early years of Reconstruction; she expressed concerns about universal male suffrage due to what she viewed as African Americans' ignorance of informed voting practices. Her views regarding black Americans reflect contemporary Southern fears of black enfranchisement.

Andrew's essays and novels about women's roles provide strong, often conflicting opinions about ideal femininity, reflecting the contrast in her commitments to both Southern idealism and her own professional independence. Her early works in the late 1860s argued against women's suffrage, as women's position under the protection of men granted them social privileges, such as perceived superior moral integrity, that they would forfeit if given the right to vote. These ideas contrast with her stated belief that women have similar governing potential to men and were capable of advancing society through private, professional work as teachers, doctors, and merchants.

=== Politics and race ===
From 1899 to 1918, Andrews proclaimed herself a socialist and wrote an article for the International Socialist Review concerning socialism; however, she supported strict racial separation that mandated "the black man to improve himself without interfering in the white man's civilization." Her views were seen through her writings on the superiority of the white race over the black and boasts that the color line had been preserved in her home town with the help of the Ku Klux Klan.

=== Botanist ===
While teaching at Wesleyan Female College in Macon, GA, Charlotte Ford cites Andrews as having her first formal contact with botany through working with the botany professor, Charles Townsend, although her interest may have sparked from her childhood days exploring the forest around Haywood. Andrews was an amateur botanist, collecting samples and conducting minor research whenever she could find the time. During her botanical career, Andrews became a strong proponent of conservation, using her published pieces to criticize turpentine distillers and developers for destroying woodlands. Her first textbook, Botany All the Year Round (1903) was aimed at a high school audience, particularly those in rural schools. It contained activities and labs aimed at attracting these schools to a low-budget scientific discipline that utilized the natural world around them, instead of pricey experimental materials. A Practical Course in Botany, her second textbook, however, was aimed at a college and university audience and stressed the relationship between botany and more practical fields such as agriculture and economics. The book was internationally acclaimed and was translated for use in French schools. Andrews was also nominated to be a member of the Italian International Academy of Science, although she was unable to travel to Naples and accept the honor.

Andrews wrote her last article, on the white oak, in 1926.

After her death, Andrews bequeathed the royalties from her books to the city of Rome, Georgia for a municipal forest reserve, although the city eventually turned the money back over to her estate due to a lack of funds, likely related to the Great Depression. She also donated more than 3,000 plant specimens from her personal collection to the Alabama Department of Agriculture.

Andrews died in Rome, GA on January 21, 1931, at the age of ninety. She is buried in the family plot in Resthaven Cemetery, in Washington, GA.

== Gallery ==
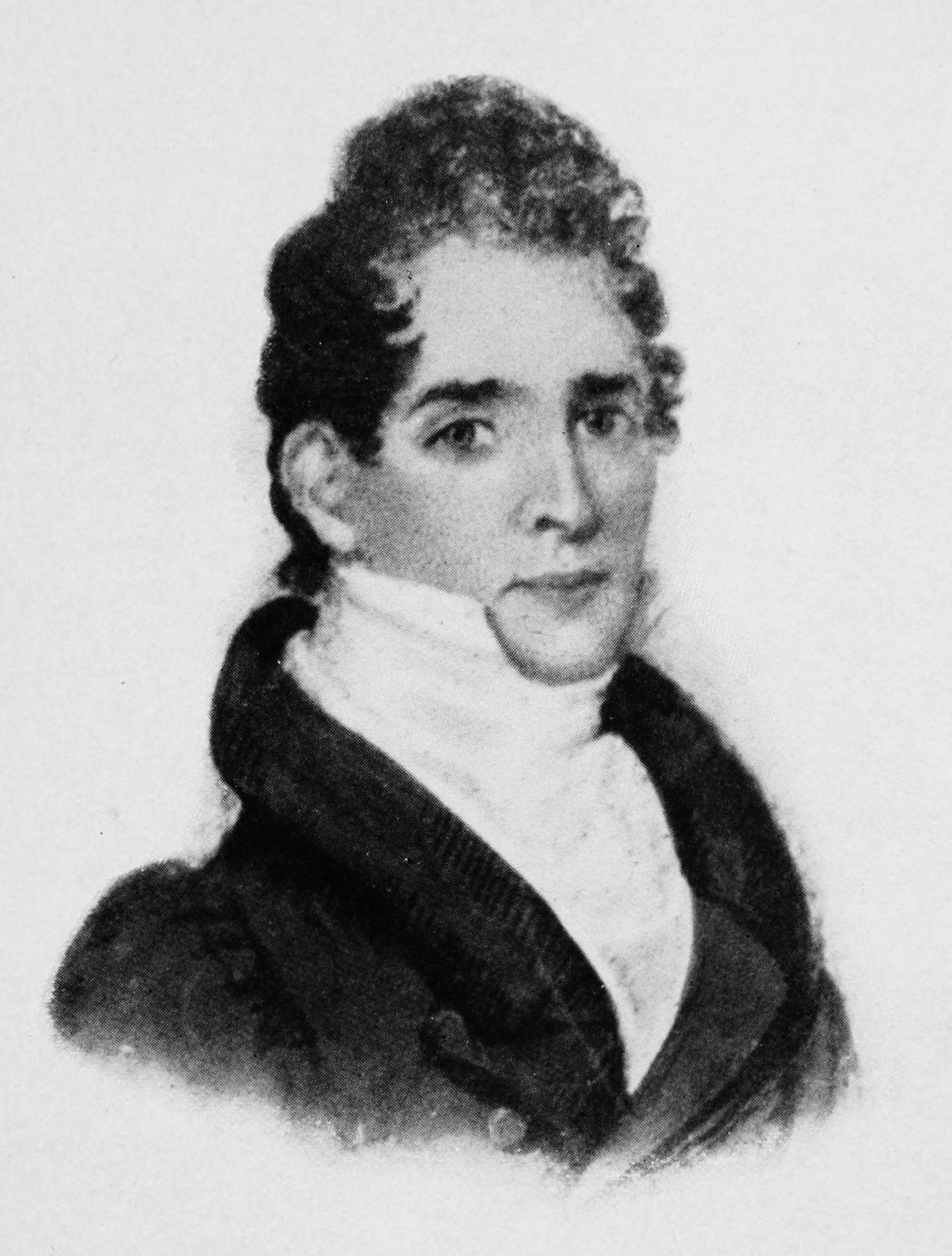
Eliza's father Judge Garnett Andrews 1827

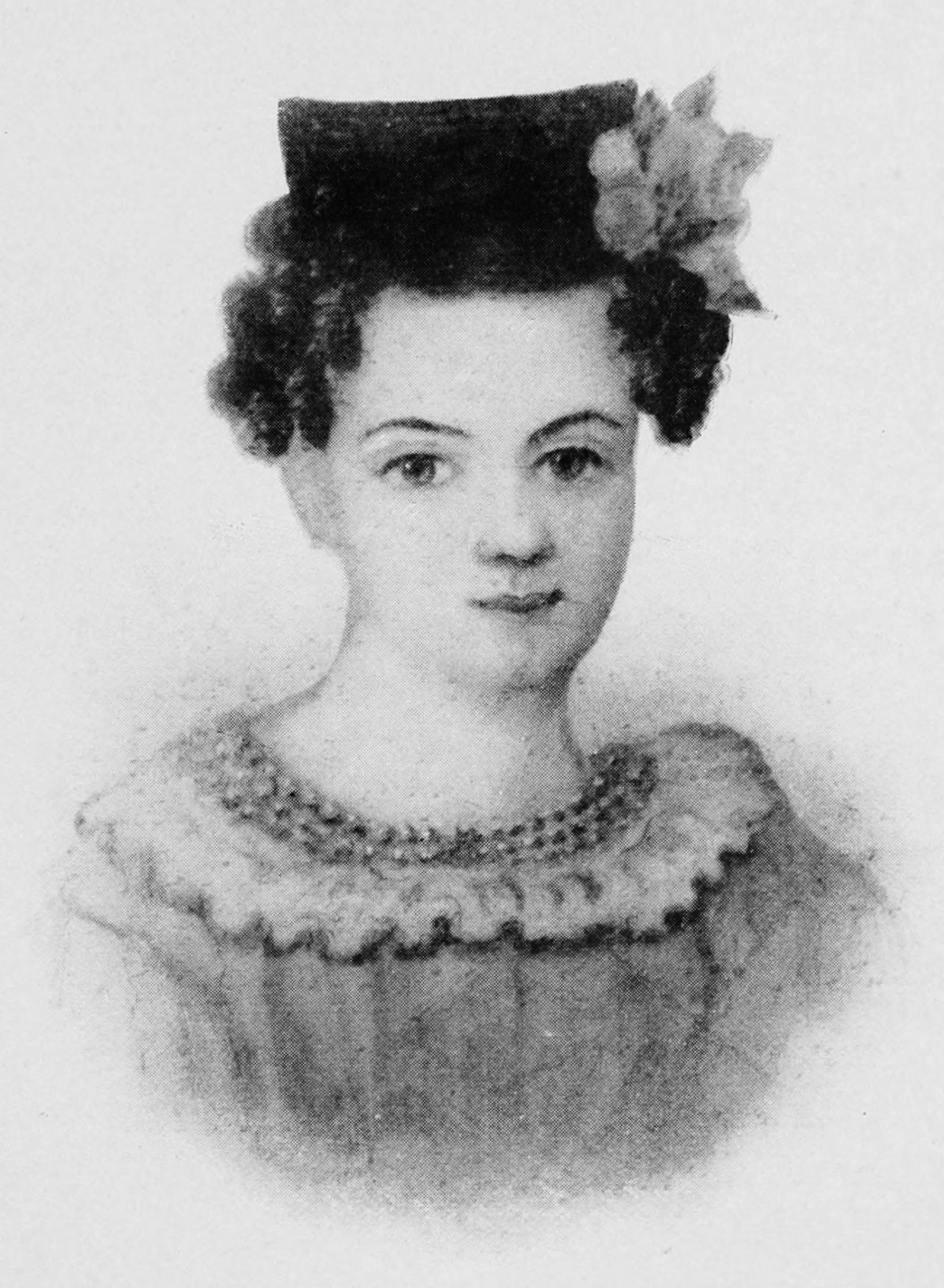
Eliza's mother Annulet Andrews, 1827

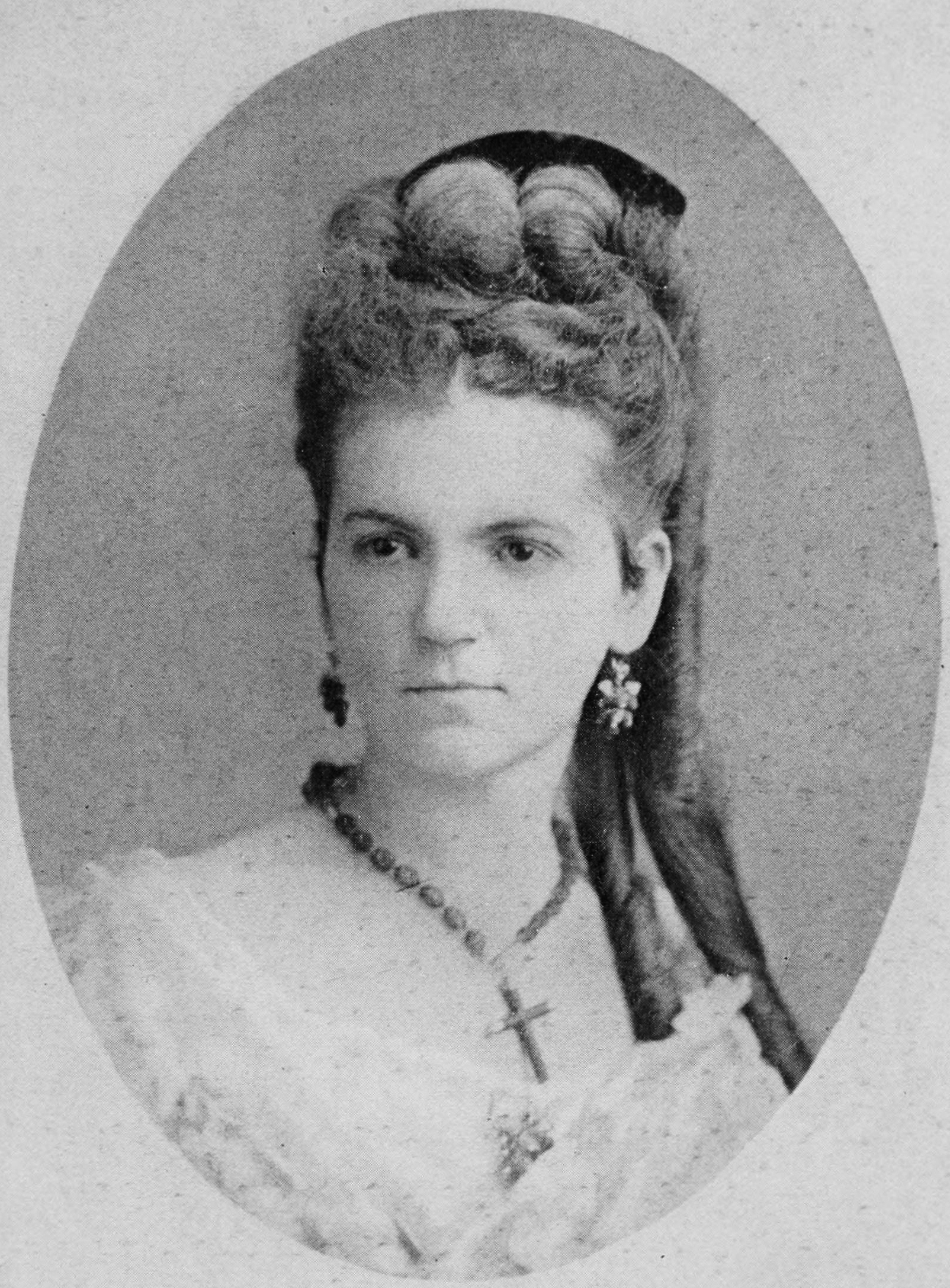
Eliza's younger sister Metta Andrews, 1872

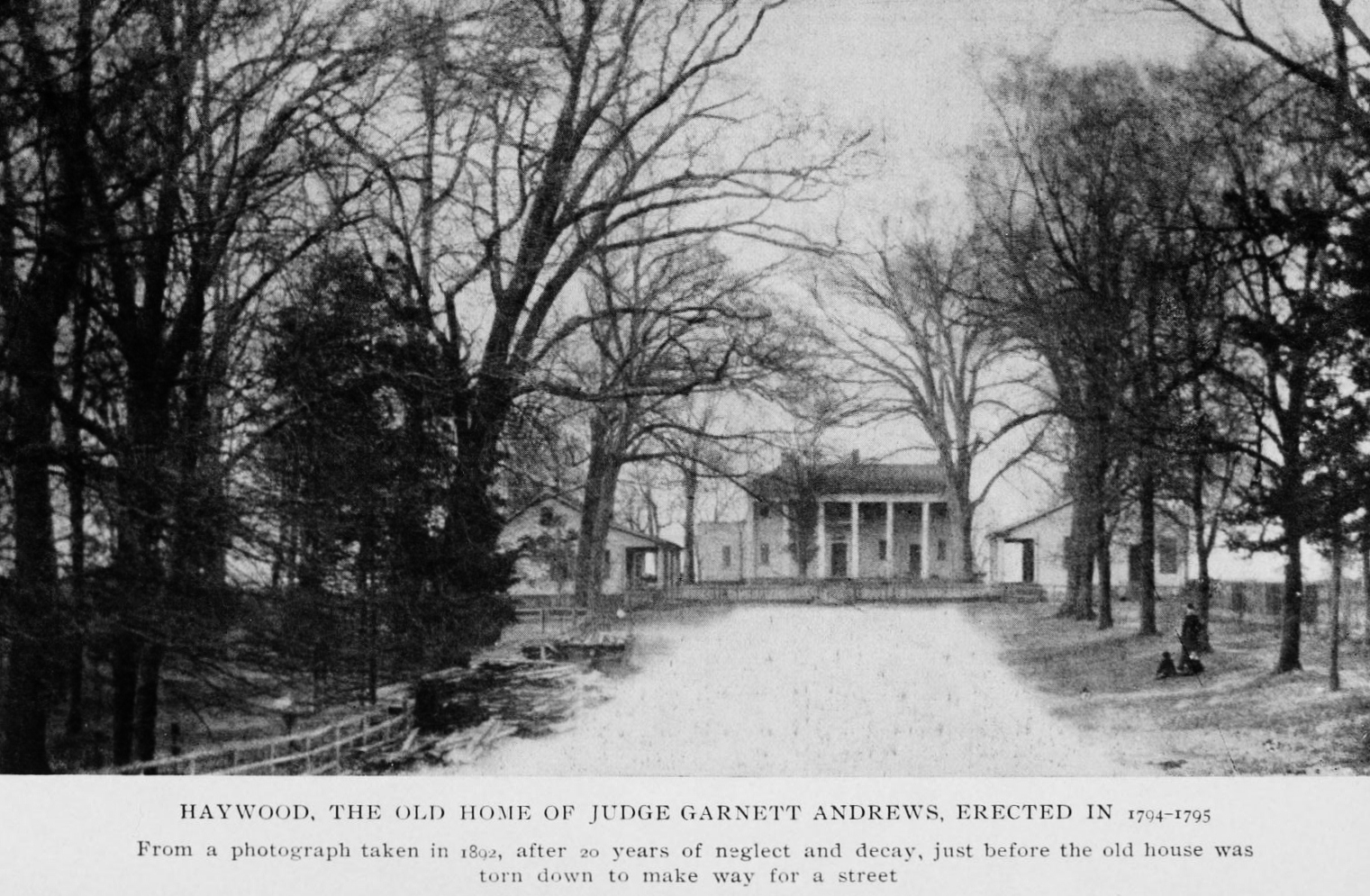
Haywood Plantation, where Eliza was born

== Bibliography ==
- The War-Time Journal of a Georgia Girl, 1864-1865.
- Journal of a Georgia Women, 1870-1872.
- A Family Secret (novel)
- Prince Hal: Or, The Romance of a Rich Young Man
- Botany All the Year Round
- A Practical Course in Botany
