= Edward Lewis Wallant =

American novelist (1926–1962)

Edward Lewis Wallant (October 19, 1926 – December 5, 1962) was an American novelist who wrote The Pawnbroker (1961). It was adapted into an award-winning film of the same name, directed by Sidney Lumet and starring Rod Steiger. He also worked in the 1950s as an art director at the advertising firm McCann Erickson.

== Life and career ==
Wallant was born in New Haven, Connecticut, to Anna Henrietta Mendel and Sol Ellis Wallant.

He served in World War II in 1945 as a gunner's mate with the U.S. Navy. He spent a total of two semesters the University of Connecticut and graduated from Pratt Institute in 1950, also studying literature and creative writing at The New School. His time at Pratt Institute in Brooklyn, with daily commutes to Manhattan and frequent visits to jazz clubs, inspired the New York settings of his books.

He worked from 1957 to 1961 as an art director at advertising firm McCann-Erickson while he wrote The Pawnbroker, working on accounts such as Bulova, Chock full o' Nuts, and Oreo by day while writing at night. Encouraged by his experience at the Bread Loaf Writer's Conference, he won a Guggenheim Award in 1962.

Wallant began writing professionally at age twenty-nine. His first published works were short stories published in the New Voices: American Writing Today series volumes I, II and III. These stories include "When Ben Awakened", "I Held Back My Hand", and "The Man Who Made a Nice Appearance", among others. His novels include The Human Season (1960) and The Pawnbroker (1961), which was adapted into the 1964 Oscar-nominated film of the same name directed by Sidney Lumet and starring Rod Steiger, Geraldine Fitzgerald, Juano Hernandez and Morgan Freeman in his feature film debut.

Two of his novels were published posthumously: The Tenants of Moonbloom (1963) and The Children at the Gate (1964). The Tenants of Moonbloom was republished in 2003 by The New York Review of Books.

Wallant has been compared to fellow Jewish-American writers of the postwar period such as Saul Bellow and Philip Roth.

Wallant died of an aneurysm at the age of 36. He was survived by his wife Joyce, who died in 1991, and by daughters Leslie and Kim and son Scott. His grandchildren include Nina, Steve, Nora, Edward (Eddie), Jon, Esme and Ruthie.

== Legacy ==
The Edward Lewis Wallant Award was established in Connecticut shortly after his death in 1962. The award is presented annually to a writer whose fiction has significance for American Jews. The first awardee, in 1963, was Norman Fruchter. Subsequent awardees have included Hugh Nissenson, Chaim Potok, Leo E. Litwak, Cynthia Ozick, Arthur A. Cohen, Susan Fromberg Schaeffer, Anne Bernays, Curt Leviant, Francine Prose, Jay Neugeboren, Daphne Merkin, Steve Stern, Melvin Jules Bukiet, Gerald Shapiro, Rebecca Goldstein, Thane Rosenbaum, Harvey Grossinger, Allegra Goodman, Judy Budnitz, Myla Goldberg, Dara Horn, Jonathan Rosen, Nicole Krauss, Ehud Havazelet, Eileen Pollack, Sara Houghteling, Julie Orringer, Edith Pearlman, Kenneth Bonert, David Bezmozgis, Rebecca Dinerstein, Ayelet Tsabari, Margot Singer, and Benjamin Resnick, among others.

== Novels ==
- The Human Season (1960)
- The Pawnbroker (1961)
- The Tenants of Moonbloom (1963)
- The Children at the Gate (1964)

== Awards ==
- 1961: National Jewish Book Award for The Human Season
