= Edward Lewis Wallant Award =

American literary award

The Edward Lewis Wallant Award is an annual literary award presented to a writer whose fiction is considered to have significance for American Jews. It was established in 1962 at the University of Hartford by Fran and Irving Waltman.

The award is named for Jewish American writer Edward Lewis Wallant.

== Awards ==
Award winners
| Year | Author | Title | Ref. |
|---|---|---|---|
| 1963 | Norman Fruchter | Coat Upon a Stick | |
| 1964 | Seymour Epstein | Leah | |
| 1965 | Hugh Nissenson | A Pile of Stones | |
| 1966 | Gene Hurwitz | Home Is Where You Start From | |
| 1967 | Chaim Potok | The Chosen | |
| 1968 | No award | | |
| 1969 | Leo Litwak | Waiting for the News | |
| 1970 | No award | | |
| 1971 | Cynthia Ozick | The Pagan Rabbi | |
| 1972 | Robert Kotlowitz | Somewhere Else | |
| 1973 | Arthur A. Cohen | In the Days of Simon Stern | |
| 1974 | Susan Fromberg Schaeffer | Anya | |
| 1975 | Anne Bernays | Growing Up Rich | |
| 1976 | No award | | |
| 1977 | Curt Leviant | The Yemenite Girl | |
| 1978 | No award | | |
| 1979 | No award | | |
| 1980 | Johanna Kaplan | O My America! | |
| 1981 | Allen Hoffman | Kagan's Superfecta | |
| 1982 | No award | | |
| 1983 | Francine Prose | Hungry Hearts | |
| 1984 | No award | | |
| 1985 | Jay Neugeboren | Before My Life Began | |
| 1986 | Daphne Merkin | Enchantment | |
| 1987 | Steve Stern | Lazar Malkin Enters Heaven | |
| 1988 | Tova Reich | Master of the Return | |
| 1989 | Jerome Badanes | The Final Opus of Leon Solomon | |
| 1990 | No award | | |
| 1991 | No award | | |
| 1992 | Melvin Jules Bukiet | Stories of an Imaginary Childhood | |
| 1993 | Gerald Shapiro | From Hunger | |
| 1994 | No award | | |
| 1995 | Rebecca Goldstein | Mazel | |
| 1996 | Thane Rosenbaum | Elijah Visible | |
| 1997 | Harvey Grossinger | The Quarry | |
| 1998 | No award | | |
| 1999 | Allegra Goodman | Kaaterskill Falls | |
| 2000 | Judy Budnitz | If I Told You Once | |
| 2001 | Myla Goldberg | Bee Season | |
| 2002 | Dara Horn | In the Image | |
| 2003 | Joan Leegant | An Hour in Paradise | |
| 2004 | Jonathan Rosen | Joy Comes in the Morning | |
| 2005 | Nicole Krauss | The History of Love | |
| 2006 | No award | | |
| 2007 | Ehud Havazelet | Bearing the Body | |
| 2008 | Eileen Pollack | In the Mouth | |
| 2009 | Sara Houghteling | Pictures at an Exhibition | |
| 2010 | Julie Orringer | The Invisible Bridge | |
| 2011 | Edith Pearlman | Binocular Vision | |
| 2012 | Joshua Henkin | The World Without You | |
| 2013 | Kenneth Bonert | The Lion Seeker | |
| 2014 | David Bezmozgis | The Betrayers | |
| 2015 | Rebecca Dinerstein | The Sunlit Night | |
| 2016 | Ayelet Tsabari | The Best Place on Earth | |
| 2017 | Margot Singer | Underground Fugue | |
| 2018 | Eduardo Halfon | Mourning | |
| 2019 | Peter Orner | Maggie Brown & Others | |
| 2020 | Lee Conell | The Party Upstairs | |
| 2021 | Hanna Halperin | Something Wild | |
| 2022 | Liana Finck | Let There Be Light: The Real Story of Her Creation | |
| 2023 | Elizabeth Graver | Kantika | |
| 2024 | Scott Nadelson | Trust Me | |
| 2025 | Benjamin Resnick | Next Stop | |
