= Woman's Intuition =

Woman's Intuition or Women's Intuition may refer to:

== Books and comics ==
- Women's Intuition, book by Lisa Samson that was a finalist for the Christy Award
- "A Woman's Intuition", chapter of the manga Tuxedo Gin
- "Women's Intuition", a chapter of the manga series Kobato
- "A Woman's Intuition", a chapter of the manga series Freezing
- "Feminine Intuition", a short story by Isaac Asimov featuring Susan Calvin.

== Film and television ==
- "A Woman's Intuition", an episode of The Doris Day Show
- Woman's Intuition, short film by Patrick Rea
- "Women's Intuition", an episode of the American television series 90210
- Women's Intuition, 2004 film with Alexander Dyachenko

== Music ==
=== Albums ===
- A Woman's Intuition, album by Laila Dalseth

=== Songs ===
- "A Woman's Intuition", song by The Wilburn Brothers
- "A Woman's Intuition", song on The Grumbleweeds Radio Show
- "A Woman's Intuition", song by LaWanda Lindsey from the album Swingin' & Singin' My Song
- "A Woman's Intuition", song by Tiny Topsy
- "Woman's Intuition", song by Michelle Wright from the album Michelle Wright
- "Woman's Intuition", song by Angela Bofill from the album Tell Me Tomorrow
- "Woman's Intuition", song by Maria Lawson from the album Maria Lawson
- "Woman's Intuition", song by Priscilla Wright from the album When You Love Somebody
- "Women's Intuition", song by Ian Hunter from the album YUI Orta

== Other uses ==
- Women's Intuition (hats), an art piece by Lenka Clayton

== See also ==
- Energetic Pregnancy, Women's Intuition, Women, Sex, & Desire: Exploring Your Sexuality at Every Stage of Life, book by Elizabeth Davis
- Intuition (disambiguation)
