= Dictate =

Dictate can refer to:

- Dictation (disambiguation)
- Dictator
- Edict
