= Intuit (disambiguation) =

Intuit is an American software company.

Intuit may also refer to:

- Intuit (Ramona Falls album)
- Intuit (Kurt Rosenwinkel album)
- Intuit, a limited edition collection of science fiction short stories by Hal Clement
- Intuit: The Center for Intuitive and Outsider Art, a Chicago-based art museum

== See also ==
- Intuition (disambiguation)
