= Arthur A. Cohen =

American Jewish scholar (1928–1986)

Arthur Allen Cohen
- Cohen c. 1973
- Born: 25 June 1928; New York City, U.S.
- Died: 31 October 1986 (aged 58)
- Awards: Edward Lewis Wallant Award, National Jewish Book Award

Education
- Education: University of Chicago

Philosophical work
- Era: 1951–1986
- Main interests: Judaism, Holocaust
- Notable works: The Natural and the Supernatural Jew (1962), In the Days of Simon Stern (1973), The Tremendum (1981)
- Notable ideas: tremendum

Arthur Allen Cohen (June 25, 1928 – October 31, 1986) was an American scholar, art critic, theologian, publisher, and author.

Scholar David M. Stern has written of Cohen: "Though he was best known as a novelist and theologian, he also pursued successful careers as a highly regarded editor and publisher, as an expert collector and dealer in rare books and documents [of] twentieth-century art, and as a man of letters and cultural critic who wrote with equal authority on modern European literature, medieval Jewish mysticism, the history of Dada and surrealism, and modern typography and design."

== Biography ==
=== Early life and education ===
Born in New York City in 1928, Arthur Allen Cohen was the son of Isidore Meyer and Bess Junger Cohen, both second-generation Americans. Though he would not publish his first novel until the age of 39, he told Thomas Lask in 1980, "I've actually been writing fiction since I was very young. [...] I always wrote stories." Cohen entered University of Chicago at the age of 16, where he received his B.A. in 1946. It was during his undergraduate years at Chicago that Cohen had an intellectual crisis, which he would later describe in the widely anthologized essay, "Why I Choose to be Jewish" (1959), and that marked the rest of his life. Confronted with the thoroughgoing Christianity of Western culture, and reading highly influential Christian literature, Cohen considered becoming a Christian. However, he was soon put in contact with Milton Steinberg, a leading Jewish thinker, who set him on a course of Jewish education which brought him to a deeper relationship with his heritage and ended his interest in converting.

In 1949 Cohen earned his M.A. in philosophy at University of Chicago with a thesis on Kierkegaard and Nietzsche. He then briefly studied at both Hebrew University and Union Theological Seminary, before beginning doctoral work at the Jewish Theological Seminary of America, where he studied medieval Jewish philosophy. In 1951, however, Cohen, "who found it insulated and unexciting compared to Chicago," left the seminary without completing his PhD. Overall, during his university years Cohen was taught by many intellectual luminaries of the mid-century, including Joachim Wach, Paul Tillich, E. K. Brown, and Richard McKeon.

=== Publisher, editor, bookseller ===
Though his intellectual legacy rests on his books, Cohen never earned his livelihood in academic settings, nor did he support himself on his writings alone. In 1951, after leaving the Jewish Theological Seminary, he and his friend Cecil Hemley co-founded Noonday Press. Small as it was, Noonday Press soon had a backlist of world-class authors, such as Karl Jaspers, Louise Bogan, Machado de Assis, Sholom Aleichem, and Isaac Bashevis Singer. Then in 1955, Cohen established Meridian Books, "a quality-paperback list," which, notably, published Hannah Arendt's revised edition of Origins of Totalitarianism. Mainly focusing on reprints, books like Jacques Maritain's Creative Intuition in Art and Poetry and Constantin Stanislavski's My Life in Art sold especially well. Yet the 1950s were the heyday of quality paperback presses, and Meridian competed fiercely with larger presses in the field, notably Doubleday and New American Library of World Literature. In 1960, Cohen sold Meridian Books to World Publishing, where he was also, briefly, an editor.

In the early 1950s, Cohen met the woman he would later marry, Elaine Lustig (née Firstenberg). She and her husband, the graphic designer Alvin Lustig, had moved to New York in 1951. During this time Alvin taught at Yale University and designed covers for New Directions. Following Alvin's death in 1955, Cohen, a close friend of the couple, "suggested that [Elaine] design the book covers Alvin had originally been hired to produce" for Meridian. It was through this working relationship that they became more involved. In 1956, Elaine and Cohen married; they remained married until his death in 1986. The couple lived in Manhattan during these years.

Cohen served as an editor for several publishers over the years, including his own. After working as an editor for World Publishing, he was hired by Holt, Rinehart & Winston in 1961 as "religious-books editor," and then became editor-in-chief in 1964. In addition to his publishing and editing work, Cohen collected rare books. He and his wife founded an antiquarian bookstore named Ex Libris in 1973, which "specialized in books and documents of twentieth-century art, particularly Dada, Surrealism, and early Russian Constructivism." The business was initially run from their home, but by 1978 Ex Libris had been "moved to the ground floor of the Upper East Side Manhattan townhouse where the couple lived." Elaine finally closed Ex Libris in 1998.

The combination of Cohen's multiple lines of work and Elaine Lustig's extensive connections in the art world resulted in their home in New York being a gathering place for influential artists, critics, scholars, and writers of the era. Among the pair's frequent guests were Robert Motherwell, Richard Meier, Michael Graves, Cynthia Ozick, and Yosef Hayim Yerushalmi.

In 1968, he signed the "Writers and Editors War Tax Protest" pledge, vowing to refuse tax payments in protest against the Vietnam War.

On September 30, 1986, Cohen died from leukemia at the age of 58.

== Writings ==
=== Fiction ===
Cohen wrote six works of fiction, including The Carpenter Years (1967), A Hero in His Time (1976), Acts of Theft (1980), and An Admirable Woman (1983), the last of which won the National Jewish Book Award. Many consider In the Days of Simon Stern (1973) to be Cohen's flawed masterpiece. Cohen's final work of fiction was Artists & Enemies (1987), a collection of three novellas published posthumously.

=== Non-fiction ===
Cohen's non-fiction, in addition to his study of Buber, included The Natural and the Supernatural Jew (1962), a book which traces the history of Jewish theology from the late 15th century, through the German Jewish renaissance, and into what he saw as a hopeful yet troubled American Jewish scene. Cohen also edited a popular reader on Jewish thought, Arguments and Doctrines. One of his posthumous publications, the immense anthology Contemporary Jewish Religious Thought (1987), which he co-edited with Paul Mendes-Flohr, was very well received when it was initially published. The anthology was even reissued in paperback by the Jewish Publication Society in 2009 with a new title, 20th Century Jewish Religious Thought. In his review for the Journal for the Study of Religion, Bernard Steinberg wrote, "Cohen and Mendes-Flohr have succeeded admirably in gathering and collating a series of challenging and provocative viewpoints which in sum depict the condition of contemporary Judaism and Jewry in a most vivid manner. The daunting and ambitious task that they undertook has surely paid off." In The New York Times, Alfred Gottschalk wrote, "The publication of this scintillating book is a major achievement and deserves commendation."

Of all his writings, it is perhaps Cohen's theological work which remains the most influential. His theological reflections were expressed through both his fiction and his non-fiction, his essays on Judaism and those on literature and the arts. However, his most definitive theological statements may be found in texts like The Natural and the Supernatural Jew, If Not Now, When?, The Tremendum, and his essays in Contemporary Jewish Religious Thought. "Death of God" theologian and friend Thomas Altizer has said of his theology, "Cohen is a pure expression of the solitary theologian, and he is certainly one of our most important theologians; indeed, there are those in the Jewish world who think that he simply created Jewish theology, or if not Jewish theology, then an American or postmodern Jewish theology." More concretely, Geoffrey Hartman comments in his memoir A Scholar's Tale: "At that time [in 1957] I also met Arthur [A.] Cohen and envied his commitment to have German Jewish thought inspire (perhaps even create) a modern Jewish theology."

== Major works ==
=== In the Days of Simon Stern ===
As with all of Cohen's novels, the initial reception of In the Days of Simon Stern (1973) was mixed. However, in subsequent years there has emerged a consensus that it is Cohen's most significant work of fiction.

Cynthia Ozick wrote in The New York Times in 1973, "For a small mountain of reasons, this book ensnares one of the most extraordinarily daring ideas to inhabit an American novel in a number of years." Referring to the novel's eponymous main character, Melvin Maddocks wrote in Time, "It is one of the most venerable axioms of writing—certainly as old as Moll Flanders (1722)—that novels should be about sinners. Saints are difficult enough to deal with in real life, let alone in fiction. [...] Yet [Cohen] has taken on a saint and a fable in fiction, and won—apparently by sheer moral passion." The novel deals with Jewish life in the United States before the Second World War as well as the ramifications of the Holocaust.

Scholar Ruth Wisse has deemed In the Days of Simon Stern an example of a "midrashic mode of writing" in Jewish American literature, "one in which a familiar story or theme is given a new reading." Thomas Altizer said in his memoir, "I believe that [Cohen's] novel, In the Days of Simon Stern, is our richest Jewish theological novel, and one of our most profound responses to the Holocaust."

== Selected bibliography ==
=== Nonfiction ===
- Martin Buber (1957)
- The Natural and the Supernatural Jew: An Historical and Theological Introduction (1962)
- The Hebrew Bible in Christian, Jewish, and Muslim Art (1963)
- The Negative Way: A Collaboration (1964) with Paul Brach
- Arguments and Doctrines: A Reader of Jewish Thinking in the Aftermath of the Holocaust (1970)
- The Myth of the Judeo-Christian Tradition and Other Dissenting Essays (1970)
- A People Apart: Hasidism in America (1970) with Garvin Philip
- The Delaunays, Apollinaire and Cendrars (1972)
- The Book Stripped Bare: A Survey of Books by 20th Century Artists and Writers: An Exhibition of Books from the Arthur Cohen and Elaine Lustig Cohen Collection (1973)
- If Not Now, When? Toward a Reconstitution of the Jewish People: Conversations between Mordecai M. Kaplan and Arthur A. Cohen (1973) with Mordecai M. Kaplan
- Osip Emilevich Mandelstam: An Essay in Antiphon (1974)
- Thinking the Tremendum: Some Theological Implications of the Death Camps (1974)
- The American Imagination after the War: Notes on the Novel, Jews, and Hope (1981)
- The Tremendum: A Theological Interpretation of the Holocaust (1981)
- The Unknown Steinhardt: Prints by Jakob Steinhardt Produced between 1907 and 1934 (1987)

=== Fiction ===
- The Carpenter Years (1967)
- In the Days of Simon Stern (1973)
- A Hero in His Time (1976)
- Acts of Theft (1980)
- An Admirable Woman (1983)
- Artists & Enemies: Three Novellas (1987)

=== Edited ===
- Handbook of Christian Theology: Definition Essays on Concepts and Movements of Thoughts in Contemporary Protestantism (1958). Eds. Arthur A. Cohen and Marvin Halverson.
- Steinberg, Milton. Anatomy of Faith (1960). Ed. Arthur A. Cohen.
- Humanistic Education and Western Civilization: Essays for Robert M. Hutchins (1964). Ed. Arthur A. Cohen.
- Edited with Paul Mendes-Flohr, Contemporary Jewish Religious Thought: Original Essays on Critical Concepts, Movements, and Beliefs.
- Delaunay, Robert; Delaunay, Sonia (1978). Arthur A. Cohen (ed.). The New Art of Color. The Viking Press. ISBN 0-670-50636-2.
- The Jew: Essays from Martin Buber's Journal Der Jude: 1916-1928 (1980). Sel. and ed. Arthur A. Cohen. Trans. Joachim Neugroschel.

=== Collected ===
- An Arthur A. Cohen Reader: Selected Fiction and Writings on Judaism, Theology, Literature, and Culture (1998). Ed. David Stern and Paul R. Mendes-Flohr. Detroit: Wayne State UP, 1998.

== See also ==
- Holocaust theology
- Jewish philosophy
- Jewish American literature
