= The Tenants of Moonbloom =

Book by Edward Lewis Wallant

- First edition
- Author: Edward Lewis Wallant
- Language: English
- Publisher: Harcourt, Brace & World
- Publication date: 1963
- Publication place: United States
- Media type: Print (hardback & paperback)

The Tenants of Moonbloom is a novel by the Jewish American writer Edward Lewis Wallant (1926–1962). Wallant died of an aneurysm aged 36 with only two books published - The Human Season and The Pawnbroker. The Tenants of Moonbloom was published posthumously.

== Plot introduction ==
The story documents the emotional awakening of Norman Moonbloom, an isolated, apathetic man in his thirties who, having recently ended a career as 'perpetual student', is now reluctantly in the employ of his brother Irwin as a property agent. Irwin's tenants occupy a series of dilapidated apartments in some of the poorer areas of Manhattan, and Norman's life consists of attempting to collect their rent while constantly making them empty promises about much-needed repairs.

At first, Moonbloom resolutely insulates himself against his troublesome tenants, with their incessant complaining and idiosyncratic ways. Little by little, however, his defenses begin crumbling as they talk to him, argue with him, and impart to him their secrets and hopes. These unaccustomed intimacies bring on a seismic shift in Norman's personality, eventually inspiring him to defy his brother (who wants the apartments left exactly as they are) by undertaking all the promised repairs himself. As he goes from apartment to apartment, painting, plastering, and further immersing himself in his tenants' lives, the meek little rent collector finally comes to life.

== Style and characters ==
Thenovel features a diverse cast of characters, including a gay Black jazz musician who works as a gigolo, and elderly German Jewish man who lives alone in a poorly maintained apartment and spends much of this time drinking. Order characters include two childless sisters who care for their orphaned nephew and seek to prevent him from becoming independent. The novel also features a former Shirley Temple aspirant who has sexual relationship with Norman in exchange for reduction in rent. Another character is a reserved Italian linguist who discovers a mysterious nulge in his bathroom wall. Wallant develops these characters with considerable detail, giving each of Moonbloom's tenants a distinct personality and individual characteristics.

Wallant has an elegant, fluid writing style, and some consider The Tenants of Moonbloom to be an exemplary piece of prose (see below link).
