= Johanna Kaplan =

American author (born 1942)

Johanna Kaplan (born 1942) is an American author. She is known for her 1976 collection of short stories Other Peoples Lives which was a finalist for the 1976 National Book Award and her novel O My America which was a finalist for the 1981 National Book Award for first novel. The two works also won National Jewish Book Awards for fiction in their respective years of publication. O My America was also a finalist for the PEN/Hemingway Award for Debut Novel and won the Edward Lewis Wallant Award celebrating an author's work for having significance to the American Jewish experience and culture.

Other Peoples Lives is a collection of short stories about Jewish families living in 20th century New York City. Regarding the work, Cynthia Ozick stated the collection is a "source of every intelligent joy, and restores to reading its old flavor of visits busy with crisis, comedy, wisdom, dreaming, irony, redemption." All of the short stories contained in the work were re-released in the 2022 anthology Loss of Memory is Only Temporary which included two new short stories by Kaplan and a foreword by Francine Prose. Regarding the 2022 re-released work, Kirkus stated: "Though some situations feel dated, snarky young ladies are timeless. Plus, the dialogue is to die for."

O My America tells the story of Ezra Slavin, a Jewish immigrant to the United States who becomes an intellectual, anarchist and inspiration for pessimistic youth throughout the country. Slavin suddenly dies at an anti-war rally in 1972. Throughout his life he had been cynical, bad-tempered, argumentative and arrogant with his family and loved ones. In life he had become estranged from most of his family and friends due to his abrasive personality. But after his death, his daughter Merry who is a journalist, looks back on and reconciles her relationship with her father as his funeral approaches.

Kaplan was born in New York City and studied at New York University and Columbia University. Her writings have appeared in City Journal, Commentary, Harper's and the New York Times Book Review.

== Works ==
=== Books ===
- Other People's Lives: Stories (Knopf, 1975) ISBN 978-0394471747.
- O My America! A Novel (Harper & Row, 1980) ISBN 978-0-06-012289-8.
- Loss of Memory Is Only Temporary: Stories (Ecco, 2022) ISBN 978-0063061637.

=== Stories ===
Title	Publication	Collected in
"Sickness"	Commentary (December 1968)	Other People's Lives
"Sour or Suntanned, It Makes No Difference"	Commentary (May 1969)	Other People's Lives
"Dragon Lady"	Harper's (July 1970)	Other People's Lives
"Babysitting"	Commentary (December 1970)	Other People's Lives
"Loss of Memory Is Only Temporary"	Harper's (March 1971)	Other People's Lives
"Other People's Lives"	Other People's Lives (1975)	Other People's Lives
"Not All Jewish Families Are Alike"	Commentary (January 1976)	from O My America!
"Family Obligations"	Forthcoming (March 1983)	Loss of Memory Is Only Temporary
"Close Calls"	Commentary (May 1986)	-
"Christmas Party"	City Journal (Winter 1995)	-
"All-City Adolescent"	Commentary (May 1997)	-
"Tales of My Great-Grandfathers"	Commentary (July–August 2000)	Loss of Memory Is Only Temporary
