= The Shawl (short story) =

- Short story by Cynthia Ozick
- Language: English
- Genre: Historical short story

Publication
- Published in: The New Yorker (1980), The Shawl (1989)
- Publication date: March 26, 1980

"The Shawl" is a short story first published by Cynthia Ozick in 1980 in The New Yorker. It tells the story of three characters: Rosa, Magda, and Stella on their march to internment in a Nazi concentration camp. The Shawl is noted for its ability to instill in the reader the horror of the Holocaust in less than 2,000 words.

== Plot summary ==
The story follows Rosa, her baby Magda, and her niece Stella on their march to a Nazi concentration camp in the middle of winter. They are described as weak and starving during the march. Stella's knees are described as "tumors on sticks." Rosa is said to be a "walking cradle" because she constantly carries Magda close to her chest wrapped in her shawl. Rosa contemplates handing Magda off to one of the villagers watching their march, but decides that the guards would most likely just shoot them both. Rosa says the shawl is "magic" when Magda sucks on it because it sustained Magda for three days and three nights without food. Stella observes that Magda looks Aryan, but Rosa sees the observation as some kind of threat to Magda. At the camp, Rosa continues to hide Magda, but is in constant fear that someone will discover and kill her. One day, Stella takes Magda's shawl away to warm herself. Without her shawl, Magda, who hadn't made a sound since the march, begins screaming for her "Ma." Rosa hears the screaming, but does not run to Magda because the guards will kill them both. Instead, she runs to get the shawl and begins waving it in the hope that Magda will see it and calm down. She is too late and watches as the Nazi guards pick Magda up and throw her into the electric fence, killing her. Rosa stuffs the shawl into her mouth to stop herself from screaming.

== Origin of "The Shawl" ==
Ozick was inspired to write The Shawl by a line in the book The Rise and Fall of the Third Reich by William L. Shirer. The book mentioned a real event, a baby being thrown into an electric fence. Ozick was struck by the brutality of the death camp and felt inspired to write about that event.
