= If I Told You Once =

1999 novel by Judy Budnitz

- Author: Judy Budnitz
- Language: English
- Genre: Magical realism
- Publisher: Picador
- Publication date: November 1, 1999
- Publication place: USA
- Pages: 304
- ISBN: 0-312-20285-7

If I Told You Once is a novel by American author Judy Budnitz, published in 1999 by Picador. Budintz's first novel, the book won the 2000 Edward Lewis Wallant Award was shortlisted for the 2000 Women's Prize for Fiction.

== Summary ==
The novel initially follows Ilana, a girl fleeing an unnamed Eastern European country and traveling to New York City. The narrative later becomes interwoven with the story of three other generations of Ilana's family - her daughter, granddaughter and great-granddaughter.

== Reception ==
If I Told You Once received mixed reviews. Publishers Weekly praised Budnitz's "hypnotic prose" and "haunting quality". Kirkus Reviews described the novel as a "kind of Jewish Rashomon, delivered with humor and heart.

Newsday was critical of the novel's narrative structure, questioning the need for multiple generations of narrators.

== Awards ==
In 2000, the novel won the Edward Lewis Wallant Award and was shortlisted for the Women's Prize for Fiction in 2000.
