= Sam (novel) =

2023 novel by Allegra Goodman

- First edition cover of Sam
- Author: Allegra Goodman
- Cover artist: Donna Cheng
- Language: English
- Genre: Literary fiction
- Published: 2023 (Dial)
- Publication date: January 3, 2023
- Publication place: United States
- Pages: 336
- ISBN: 9780593596821

Sam is a literary fiction novel by Allegra Goodman. It was published in the United States by Dial Press on January 3, 2023.

== Plot ==
Sam is a coming-of-age story following a girl named Sam who grows up in Beverly, Massachusetts. Sam's father is a magician who constantly travels for performances and her mother is a hairdresser. As Sam grows up, she becomes increasingly attached to the sport of climbing – climbing trees, buildings, and rock climbing.

== Development history ==
=== Publication history ===
Sam was published on January 3, 2023 by Dial Press.

== Reception ==
Mary Pols praised the book in The New York Times Book Review, drawing a positive comparison to Richard Linklater's 2014 film Boyhood. Booklist's Donna Seaman positively described Goodman's prose and narration style and a review in BookPage described the book as "stand[ing] out among realistic coming-of-age novels."

In contrast, Sam received more negative reviews from several prominent critics. The Boston Globe published a review of the book by Priscilla Gilman who criticized Goodman's control of the various character's voices and criticized what she saw as a lack of reflection throughout the novel, describing the book as "YA masquerading as adult fiction." The Washington Post's Ron Charles praised Goodman's language and the novel's "prettiness" but wrote that those qualities led to the story feeling predictable.

While Publishers Weekly wrote positively about the book's story and Goodman's prose, Kirkus Reviews panned the book, criticizing Goodman for not exploring the implications of Sam's sexual experimentation and writing that "there isn't enough texture in its treatment of the many serious issues faced by its heroine to satisfy readers."

John Podhoretz of Commentary Magazine praised the book for its realistic portrayal of a child protagonist.

Sam was selected by Jenna Bush Hager as a Today show book club pick shortly after publication.
