= Krishna Kaur Khalsa =

American actress and yoga instructor (born 1939)

Krishna Kaur (née Thelma Oliver; born 6 May 1939), is an American yoga teacher, musician, and a former actress and dancer. Her early work was in theatre and film in the 1960s. She is proponent of Kundalini Yoga.

== Early life and education ==
Thelma Oliver was born in Los Angeles, California in 1939 to Cappy Oliver, a trumpet player in Lionel Hampton's band. She studied dance under Jeni Le Gon and later earned a degree in Drama and Theatre Arts from the University of California, Los Angeles (UCLA).

== Career ==
=== Performance ===
Oliver began her stage career off-Broadway in The Blacks by Jean Genet, performing alongside Louis Gossett Jr. She also appeared in Fly Blackbird, Cindy, and The Living Premise, where she temporarily replaced Diana Sands in 1963.

Her film appearances began in 1958 with a small role in South Pacific. She later appeared in Pirates of Tortuga (1961), Black Like Me (1964), and Sidney Lumet's The Pawnbroker (1964). On Broadway, she played “Helene” in Sweet Charity with Gwen Verdon.

=== Yoga ===
In 1970, Oliver met Yogi Bhajan and he renamed her "Krishna Kaur," meaning Divine Princess. According to Shanti Kaur Khalsa, she was given permission by Yogi Bhajan to teach yoga specifically within the Black community. Krishna Kaur established a yoga community in the neighborhood of Watts, Los Angeles, including a live-in center as well as a children's school and daycare.

Krishna Kaur described her philosophy regarding her yoga mission: "The revolution is really one of the mind. Blacks have got to realize where the power really is. The struggle is not on a physical level. It is on the level of the mind."

In the 1970s, she toured and recorded with a group called "Sat Nam West." In 2014, she released an album, One Creator.

Krishna Kaur travelled to Harimandir Sahib in December 1970. According to Shanti Kaur Khalsa, in August 1980, Krishna Kaur was the first woman recorded singing Sikh hymns inside the Golden Temple complex.

In the 1990s, she helped found the International Black Yoga Teachers Association. She also established Yoga for Youth, a program designed to support young individuals involved in the U.S. criminal justice system. Krishna Kaur serves as the chairman of the Yoga for Youth board.

== Filmography ==
- South Pacific (1958)
- Pirates of Tortuga (1961)
- Black Like Me (1964)
- The Pawnbroker (1964)

== See also ==
- Film censorship in the United States
