= Paul Tuttle =

American designer (1918–2002)

- Born: 1918; St. Louis, Missouri, US
- Died: August 2, 2002 (aged 83–84); Santa Barbara, California
- Occupation: Furniture designer
- Known for: "Z" Chair

Paul Tuttle (1918 – August 2, 2002) was an American designer known primarily for his work in furniture design, and secondarily for his work in interior design and architectural design. Tuttle had no formal education in design, instead drawing influence from his own experience and the mentorship of well known designers such as Alvin Lustig, Welton Becket, and Frank Lloyd Wright. Tuttle designed furniture for over 50 years, resulting in a body of work that included both manufactured and custom made furniture.

== Early life ==
Tuttle was born in St. Louis, Missouri, growing up during the Great Depression. As a young man, he served in India during World War II. Upon his return, Tuttle applied to the ArtCenter College of Design in Pasadena, California, but was not accepted. Despite this, he decided to audit a class there taught by Alvin Lustig. His talent was noticed by the instructor, who hired Tuttle to work in his studio.

== Career ==
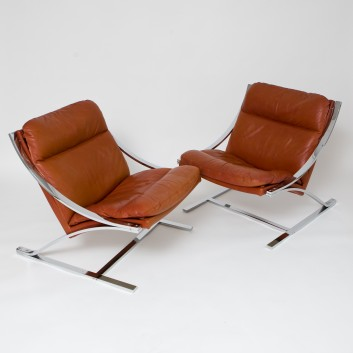
The "Z" chair, originally known as the "Rocket Launcher" for which Paul Tuttle won the Carson Pirie Scott Young Designer Award.

Tuttle started out working in the studio of designer Alvin Lustig in Los Angeles. He soon received the Frank Lloyd Wright Taliesin West Fellowship, an apprenticeship program with mentorship from Wright himself. Tuttle moved to Taliesin West in Scottsdale, Arizona, and impressed Wright during his short stay of four months. Tuttle then moved back to Los Angeles and worked on furniture building by himself awhile, before serving as an apprentice to architecture firms Welton Becket & Associates and Thornton Ladd & Associates. As an apprentice, Tuttle worked on interior design. In 1956, Tuttle moved to Santa Barbara where he met Hans Grether, owner of the Swiss pharmaceutical company Doestch, Grether & Cie. Grether hired Tuttle as a design consultant shortly thereafter.

In 1966 Tuttle gave a solo exhibition at the Pasadena Art Museum, cementing his position as a leading American designer. He also won the first ever Carson Pirie Scott Young Designer Award for the popular "Z" Chair in 1966. The design for the "Z" Chair, originally known as the "Rocket Launcher" would become Tuttle's most well known work. Tuttle was hired by Strassle in 1967 as a designer, and subsequently spent half his time abroad in Switzerland until he left the position in 1983. In 1978, Tuttle's work was featured in a solo exhibit called "Paul Tuttle, Designer" at the Santa Barbara Museum of Art. After leaving his designer position at Strassle, Tuttle continued at Strassle on a royalty only basis, but concentrated on his custom work in Santa Barbara.

In 1982, Tuttle partnered with Bud Tullis to produce custom furniture, primarily for collectors. Between 1982 and 2001, Tuttle's custom work was at its height, resulting in the creation of over 200 pieces of furniture. A 2001 retrospective entitled "Paul Tuttle Designs" at the University of California, Santa Barbara showcased Tuttle's body of work. Tuttle died on August 2, 2002, in Santa Barbara.

== Style ==
Tuttle was known for sleek, elegant, and refined modern furniture, as well as combining materials like metal, leather, and glass. Tuttle began designing furniture in the 1950s, and his style was heavily influenced by the modernist style of mentor Alvin Lustig. Tuttle followed the modernist ideal of minimalism, eschewing decorative ornamentation on his furniture. His work emphasized the materials he used and he sought to reflect the essence of function in his pieces.
