= Elaine Lustig Cohen =

American artist and graphic designer (1927–2016)

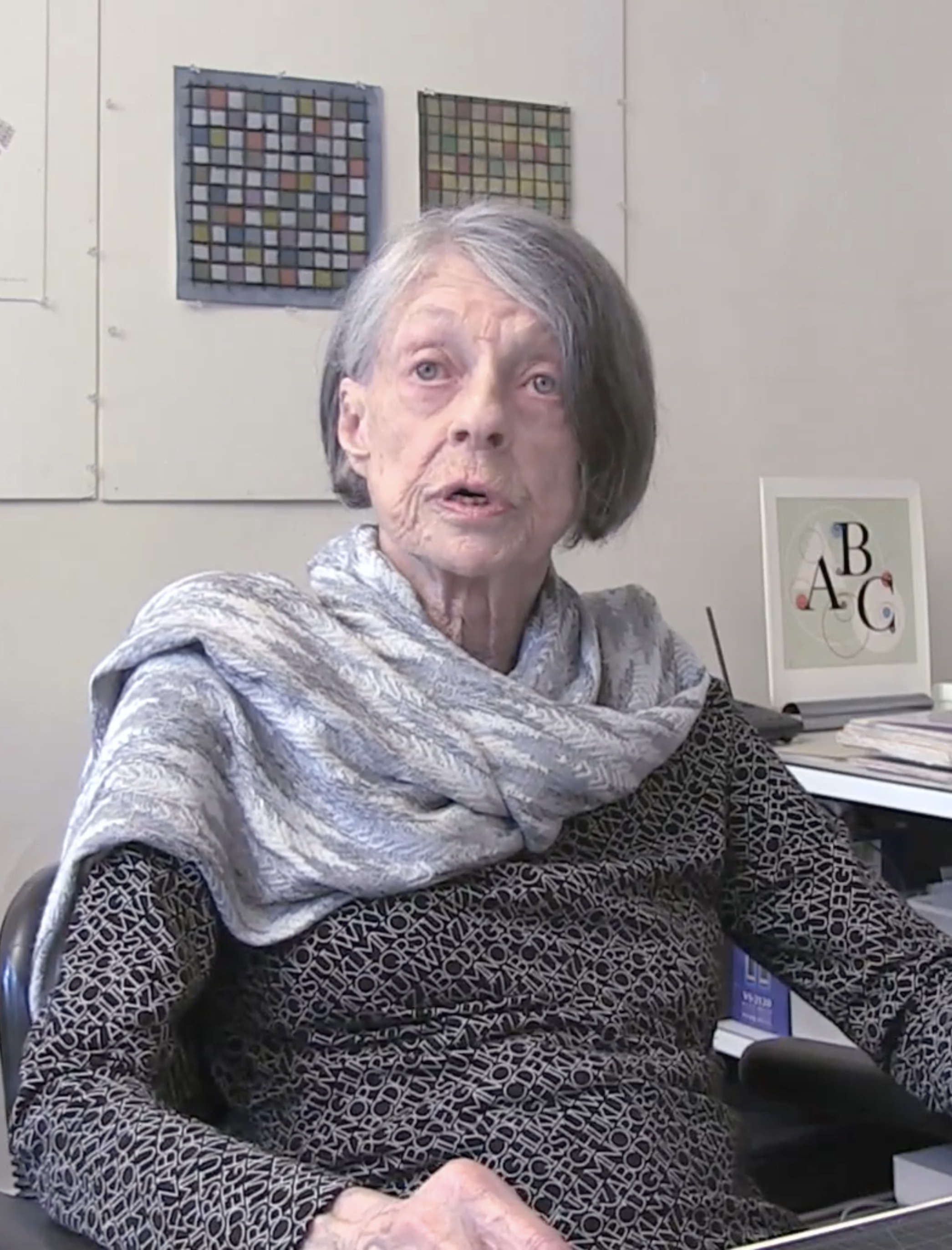
- Lustig Cohen interviewed by the Cooper Hewitt Museum, 2015
- Born: Elaine Firstenberg; March 6, 1927; Jersey City, New Jersey
- Died: October 4, 2016 (aged 89); New York City, New York
- Occupations: Graphic designer, artist and archivist
- Known for: Book covers and museum catalogs
- Spouses: Alvin Lustig (m. 1948; died 1955) Arthur A. Cohen (m. 1956; died 1986)

Elaine Lustig Cohen (née Firstenberg; March 6, 1927 – October 4, 2016) was an American graphic designer, artist, rare-book dealer, and art collector. She is best known for her work as a graphic designer during the 1950s and 60s, having created over 150 designs for book covers and museum catalogs. Her work has played a significant role in the evolution of American modernist graphic design and typography, taking influence from European avant-garde. Lustig Cohen later continued her career as a fine artist working in a variety of media. In 2011, she was named an AIGA Medalist for her achievements in graphic design.

== Early life and education ==
Lustig Cohen was born in 1927 in Jersey City, New Jersey to Herman and Elizabeth (née Loeb) Firstenberg. Her father was a Polish immigrant and worked as a plumber. Her mother, a Jersey City native, attended high school and secretary school before marrying Lustig Cohen's father. She instilled in Lustig Cohen from an early age the idea that being a woman was not a limitation and encouraged her to pursue her passions, paying first for drawing classes and eventually for her college education. As a teenager, Lustig Cohen was exposed to the contemporary art world through the American photographer Naomi Savage and took frequent trips to New York City to visit galleries and museums, such as Peggy Guggenheim's Art of This Century gallery and the MoMA. At age 15, she saw paintings by Wassily Kandinsky on exhibit at Peggy Guggenheim's first Manhattan gallery.

After finishing high school, Lustig Cohen enrolled in the Sophie Newcomb College at Tulane University. Two years later, she transferred to the University of Southern California where she graduated in 1948 with a bachelor of fine arts degree. However, she did not intend to work as a fine artist, recalling that at that age, "the idea of being an artist never even occurred to me, [...] Coming from a middle-class Jewish family, I didn't know what it was to be an artist." Instead, Lustig Cohen wanted to pursue a career in art education.

== Career ==
=== Graphic design ===
==== Assistant to Alvin Lustig ====
In 1948, during an opening at the Modern Institute of Art in Los Angeles where she was a summer intern, 20-year-old Lustig Cohen met an acclaimed graphic designer Alvin Lustig. He was 32, 12 years her senior. The two were married in December 1948 and continued their relationship for seven years, until Alvin's death in 1955. Alvin was diagnosed with diabetes as a teenager and died aged 40 from complications of the disease.

After marrying Alvin Lustig Elaine taught art at a public LA high school for one year before leaving to work as one of her husband's assistants at his design office on Sunset Boulevard. In 1951, Elaine and Alvin Lustig moved to New York where she continued to work as his assistant and office manager, setting type, preparing artwork, and managing the studio. In early 1950s, as Alvin's health and vision deteriorated due to his chronic diabetes, Lustig Cohen took on a larger role in his business, executing design concepts under her husband's direction. Alvin Lustig never intended to teach Lustig Cohen graphic design, insisting that, like other assistants, she must execute his work instead of creating her own designs. Despite this, carrying out Alvin Lustig's artistic visions and observing his process taught Lustig Cohen various graphic design techniques.

==== Freelance graphic designer ====
After her husband's death in 1955 Lustig Cohen, widowed at 28, continued running his design studio.She was one of the only few female freelance graphic designers in the U.S. at the time.

A week after her husband's funeral, she was approached by architect Philip Johnson to complete a commission given to him to create the signage for the Seagram Building, which became Lustig Cohen's first independently designed project. Johnson was so fond of her work on the signage that he later hired her to create catalogs and advertisements for the building's rental spaces. Around the same time, Arthur Cohen, founder of Meridian Books and a friend of the Lustigs, insisted Elaine create cover art for the publisher's new line of paperbacks.

In the 1960s, the Jewish Museum recruited Lustig Cohen to create graphics that would reflect the goal of director Alan Soloman to build the museum as a center of contemporary art. Lustig Cohen created about 20 bespoke catalogs for the museum's exhibitions. One notable catalog was Primary Structures, an exhibition that introduced abstraction to a wide audience.

When designing book covers and museum catalogs, one of her primary goals was to make sure the image on the cover reflected the voice of the work inside. Her modern approach was an alternative to the literal depiction of a book's narrative that was more common during this time. The Jewish Museum's 2018 exhibition of Lustig Cohen's work describes:

"Drawing on her knowledge of modern typography and avant-garde design principles, such as asymmetrical composition, dramatic scale, and image montage, Lustig Cohen forged a distinctive graphic voice. For book jackets, she described her process as one of distillation in which she would identify the central ideas of the text and render them abstractly with bold lettering, expressive forms, and playfully collaged photographic elements."

Other prominent clients of Cohen's during her time as a graphic designer were General Motors, the Museum of Primitive Art, and Rio de Janeiro's Museum of Modern Art. She designed catalogs, signage, and other printed materials. She often collaborated with architects to ensure that her designs reflected and enhanced the architecture.

While working as a freelance graphic designer, Lustig Cohen commented that being a female freelance graphic designer was uncommon. In an interview with BOMB magazine, Lustig Cohen said: "There were no female freelancers. There were many good female designers, but they either worked in fashion, publishing, or advertising. But these were salaried positions. I started in the ’50s, but it wasn’t until the ’60s that this became more commonplace." When asked if she felt any prejudice for being a female designer she said, "There were certainly many male designers that didn’t take me seriously. I wasn’t part of their conversation, even though I was included in many AIGA publications."

Lustig Cohen continued her career as a graphic designer until 1969.

=== Ex Libris ===
Arthur Cohen sold Meridian Books to World Publishing in 1960, and Elaine wished to turn to painting full-time. By the late 1960s, the two both left commercial work in order to focus on their creative pursuits and found themselves in need of additional income. They had a growing collection of early 20th century European avant-garde books, magazines, and periodicals. Arthur noticed they had many duplicates and decided to sell them; within one week, he sold everything from that first group. This experiment evolved into the founding of their rare book shop and gallery Ex Libris in 1973. They were some of the first Americans to sell European avant-garde materials, and found success in being one of the few dealers to meet the needs of this niche market. Their collection included works from various avant-garde movements including Futurism, Surrealism, Dada, and Constructivism. The couple created catalogs for the shop, with Arthur writing the text and Elaine designing the covers. Today these catalogs are considered collectibles. Ex Libris remained their primary source of income until Arthur's death in 1986. Lustig Cohen designed the catalogs until 1990, but eventually closed the store in 1998 upon having difficulty both finding materials to sell and making a significant enough profit.

=== Painting ===
In 1969, Lustig Cohen resigned from commercial design work, turning almost exclusively to painting. In the late 1970s, she began experimenting with mixed media, collage, sculpture, and printmaking.

In an article published in ArtForum, Lustig Cohen elaborated that the inspiration for her painting style was architecture. "My abstraction never came from narrative; it came from architecture," she said. "Architecture was always a part of my informal training as an artist. When Alvin and I lived in Los Angeles, we did not go to museums. ... We spent our weekends driving around and looking at Richard Neutra and Rudolf Schindler. That was the entertainment."

While there are formal similarities between her design work and paintings, Lustig Cohen clarified that only her painting process was influenced by her design work: "Part of my process did carry over to design, but none of my early design work was painted. Since in the early days of design we pasted up the images, they were manipulations of photographs, colors, and fonts. What did carry over to my paintings from the graphic work was in the sketching, because to do anything that hard-edged I had to do a sketch when I planned the paintings."

Like her book cover designs, her work frequently incorporates typography and abstraction. During the latter part of her artistic career Lustig Cohen continued to produce works both by hand and digitally using Adobe Illustrator.

== Awards and recognition ==
In 1995, the Cooper–Hewitt, National Design Museum hosted an exhibition celebrating Lustig Cohen's career as a graphic designer, which featured over eighty examples of her work. In 2012, the AIGA had an exhibition in the AIGA National Design Center in New York City called, "The Lustigs: A Cover Story". This was the first retrospective that featured the design work of both Alvin and Elaine together.

In 2011, Lustig Cohen received the AIGA medal, which is awarded to "individuals who have set standards of excellence over a lifetime of work or have made individual contributions to innovation within the practice of design."

In 2018, The Jewish Museum exhibited some of the work she produced for the museum in the 1960s, alongside some of her paintings.

== Personal life ==
Elaine Lustig Cohen and Arthur Cohen married in 1956. Of working for Arthur, she said, "Having a husband being your client is pretty easy. You never show them what you're doing until late at night. They're exhausted and they say, 'I like it.'"

Lustig Cohen died aged 89 on October 4, 2016 at her home in Manhattan in New York City.

== Exhibitions ==
=== Solo exhibitions ===
- 2018 – Masterpieces & Curiosities: Elaine Lustig Cohen, The Jewish Museum, New York, NY
- 2015 – Elaine Lustig Cohen Exhibition, The Glass House, New Canaan, CT
- 2014 – Elaine Lustig Cohen: Voice & Vision , RIT Graphic Design Archives, Rochester, NY
- 2009 – My Heroes: Portraits of the Avant-Garde, Adler & Conkright Fine Art, New York, NY
- 2008 – The Geometry of Seeing, Julie Saul Gallery, New York, NY
- 2007 – The Geometry of Seeing, Pavel Zoubok Gallery, New York, NY
- 2002 – Tea House Suite , Julie Saul Gallery, New York, NY

=== Group exhibitions ===
- 2018 – Albers, Lustig Cohen, Tissi, 1958–2018, Pratt Manhattan Gallery, Pratt Institute, New York, NY
- 2015 – How Posters Work , Cooper Hewitt Design Museum, New York, NY
- 2015 – Designing Home: Jews and Midcentury Modernism, Museum of Jewish Heritage, New York, NY, Contemporary Jewish Museum, San Francisco, CA
- 2014 – Elaine Lustig Cohen & Heman Chong: Correspondence(s) , P! Gallery, New York, NY
- 2012 – The Lustigs: A Cover Story, 1933–1961, College of Visual Arts, Saint Paul, MN, AIGA, New York, NY
- 2012 – Exploring Never Stops: Water, Ice, Nature, Kunsthandel Wolfgang Werner, Berlin, Germany
- 2012 – Every Exit is an Entrance: 30 Years of Exit Art, Exit Art, New York, NY
- 2011 – Benchmarks: Seven Women in Design, Center Gallery, Fordham University at Lincoln Center, New York, NY
- 2011 – Remix: Selections from the International Collage Center, Samek Art Gallery, Bucknell University, PA (+ other venues)
- 2011 – Conversation among Friends, Sonia Delaunay, Cooper Hewitt Museum
- 2009 – Typograffi, Philoctetes Center, New York, NY
- 2009 – Daughters of the Revolution, Women & Collage, Pavel Zoubok Gallery, New York, NY
- 2007 – In Context: Collage+Abstraction, Pavel Zoubok Gallery, New York, NY
- 2005 – Collage: Signs & Surfaces, Pavel Zoubok Gallery, New York, NY
- 2005 – Word Play , Julie Saul Gallery, New York, NY
- 2005 – Alphabet: 60 Alphabets by 47 Artists, Artscape, Baltimore, MD
- 2004 – Uncharted Territory:Mapping by Artists & Cartographers, Julie Saul Gallery, New York, NY
- 2004 – Against the Grain: Bookjackets by Alvin Lustig, Elaine Lustig Cohen, Chip Kidd, Barbara de Wilde, Fordham University at Lincoln Center, New York, NY
- 2003 – The Auroral Light:Photographs by Women, The Grolier Club, New York, NY
- 2001 – Rupture & Revision:Collage in America, Pavel Zoubok Gallery, New York, NY
- 2001 – Designing Identity: Typefaces as Human Experience, Bard Graduate Center, New York, NY
- 2000 – Women Designers in the USA, 1900–2000, Diversity and Difference, The Bard Graduate Center, New York, NY
- 2000 – Mondiale Echo’s (Global Echoes), Mondriaanhuis, Amersfoort, Netherlands
