= Dictation =

Dictation can refer to:

- Dictation (exercise), when one person speaks while another person transcribes
- Dictation: A Quartet, a collection of short stories by Cynthia Ozick, published in 2008
- Digital dictation, the use of digital electronic media for dictation
- Music dictation, an ear training exercise in which the student copies down music while listening to it

== See also ==
- Dictatorship
