= Cindy (musical) =

1964 musical

- Music: Johnny Brandon
- Lyrics: Johnny Brandon
- Book: Joe Sauter; Mike Sawyer
- Basis: Cinderella fairy tale
- Productions: Off-Broadway 1964

Cindy is a musical with music and lyrics by Johnny Brandon, and a book by Joe Sauter and Mike Sawyer. It ran off-Broadway at the Gate, Orpheum, and Cricket Theatres (not simultaneously) in 1964 and 1965. It is an adaptation of the story of Cinderella. It was produced by Chandler Warren and Philip Temple, by arrangement with Stuart Wiener and Jerry Grace.

== Productions ==
Cindy opened at the Gate Theatre on March 19, 1964, and closed June 21. On September 24, it reopened at the Orpheum Theatre. It transferred to the Cricket Theatre on January 19, 1965, and closed on May 2, 1965.

== Cast and characters ==
=== Original cast ===
Character	Gate Original Cast	Cricket Original Cast
Cindy Kreller	Jacqueline Mayro	Kelly Wood
Lucky	Johnny Harmon	Jerry Wilkins
Irving Kreller "Papa"	Frank Nastasi	Frank Nastasi
Zelda Kreller "Mama"	Sylvia Mann	Nancy Carroll
Golda Kreller	Amelia Varney	Amelia Varney
Della Kreller	Dena Dietrich	Mary Betten
Chuck Rosenfeld	Joe Masiell	Joe Masiell
David Rosenfeld	Mike Sawyer	Mike Sawyer
Ruth Rosenfeld	Lizabeth Pritchett	Lizabeth Pritchett
Storytellers	Thelma Oliver, Tommy Karaty, Mark Stone	Thelma Oliver, Rick Landon, Mark Stone

=== Cricket cast replacements ===
- Cindy Kreller: Isabelle Farrell
- Lucky: Tommy Karaty, Rick Landon
- Papa: David Howard
- Mama: Milly Weitz
- Della Kreller: Alice Beardsley
- Chuck Rosenfeld: Joe Bellomo
- Ruth Rosenfeld: Evelyn Bell, Elizabeth Parrish
- Storytellers: Charles Abbate, Michael Loman

== Musical numbers ==
Act I

- "Once Upon a Time" – Storytellers
- "Let's Pretend" – Cindy and Lucky
- "Is There Something to What He Said?" – Cindy
- "Papa, Let's Do It Again" – Mama, Papa and Storytellers
- "A Genuine Feminine Girl" – Cindy
- "Cindy" – Lucky
- "Think Mink" – Golda and Della
- "A Genuine Feminine Girl" (Reprise) – Cindy
- "Tonight's the Night" – Storytellers
- "Who Am I?" – Cindy and Chuck

Act II

- "Act II Opening" – Storytellers
- "If You've Got It, You've Got It" – Golda, Della, Mama and Papa
- "The Life That I Had Planned for Him" – Mrs. Rosenfeld
- "If It's Love" – Cindy and Chuck
- "Got the World in the Palm of My Hand" – Chuck
- "Call Me Lucky" – Lucky
- "Got the World in the Palm of My Hand" (Reprise) – Storytellers
- "Laugh It Up" – Cindy, Mama, Papa and Boy Storyteller
- "Once Upon a Time" (Reprise 1) – Storytellers
- "Let's Pretend" (Reprise) – Cindy and Lucky
- "Cindy" (Reprise)/"Who Am I?" (Reprise) – Cindy and Lucky
- "What a Wedding" – Mama, Papa, Golda, Della, Mr. Rosenfeld, Mrs. Rosenfeld and Chuck
- "Once Upon a Time" (Reprise 2) – Storytellers
- "Finale" – Company
