= Intuition (disambiguation) =

Intuition is a phenomenon of the mind described as the ability to acquire knowledge without inference or the use of reason.

Intuition may also refer to:

== Music ==
- Intuition (rapper) (born 1981), American rapper

=== Albums ===
- Intuition (Angela Bofill album)
- Intuition (Bill Evans album)
- Intuition (DJ Encore album)
- Intuition (Jamie Foxx album)
- Intuition (Linx album)
- Intuition (TNT album)
- Intuition (Wallace Roney album)

=== Songs ===
- "Intuition" (free improvisation), a 1949 recording by Lennie Tristano's quintet
- "Intuition" (Linx song), 1981
- "Intuition" (Jewel song), 2003
- "Intuition", a song by John Lennon from the album Mind Games, 1973
- "Intuition", a song by Natalie Imbruglia from the album Left of the Middle, 1997
- "Intuition", a song by Selena Gomez & the Scene from the album A Year Without Rain, 2010
- "Intuition", a song by CN Blue from the album First Step, 2011
- "Intuition", a song by Reks from The Greatest X, 2016
- "Intuition", a song by Northlane from the album Mesmer, 2017

== Other uses ==
- Intuition (MBTI), one of the four axes of the Myers-Briggs Type Indicator
- Intuition (Amiga), a graphical user interface toolkit supplied with the Commodore Amiga computer
- Intuition (Bergson), the philosophical method of Henri Bergson
- Intuition Peak, a geographical feature in Antarctica
- Intuition (film), an Argentinian crime thriller film
- Intuition (novel), by Allegra Goodman
- Intuition (game), a board game published 1990
