= The Family Markowitz =

1996 novel by Allegra Goodman

- Author: Allegra Goodman
- Language: English
- Publisher: Farrar, Straus, and Giroux
- Publication date: 1996 (first edition)
- Publication place: United States
- Media type: Print
- Pages: 262 p.
- ISBN: 0374153213
- OCLC: 33948390

The Family Markowitz is a 1996 novel, made up of a series of linked short stories written by Allegra Goodman.

== Plot summary ==
Centred on a middle-class American Jewish family, The Family Markowitz touches on themes ranging from religiosity to ageing, and from homosexuality to intermarriage. The novel tells the story of four main characters: Rose Markowitz (the matriarch), her sons Ed and Henry, and her daughter-in-law Sarah. Through these characters, the reader meets many other members of the family including Ed's four children, Henry's wife, and Rose's stepdaughter.

== Characters in The Family Markowitz ==
=== Rose Markowitz ===
The Family Markowitz begins by introducing Rose, the matriarch of the Markowitz family. In the opening chapter, Rose cares for her dying second husband in their New York apartment. As the years pass, she moves to California (to be near Henry) and then to Washington DC (to be near Ed and his wife Sarah). As health declines rapidly, she becomes addicted to painkillers. A highly imaginative and wistful woman, Rose displays a tendency to embroider her own history, beginning in the chapter "Oral History Project." Rose's apparent "lack of history" serves as a jumping off point for a number of themes built on by the other characters.

=== Henry Markowitz ===
Henry Markowitz, Rose's elder son, is an echo of his mother in many ways—notably in his tendency to invent his own history. Henry begins the novel as an employee in an art gallery in California. He is initially presented as a closeted gay man. When he becomes fed-up with the California gay scene, Henry moves to Oxford, England, to manage a Laura Ashley shop, collect antiques, and embrace a traditional European lifestyle. (His sister-in-law Sarah imagines that he is retreating into "the decorated nineteenth century.") As Rose fondly remembers her brief childhood residence in England, Henry is in some sense drawing on his mother's history.

=== Ed Markowitz ===
Ed, the younger and more conventional son, is a Georgetown University professor specializing in the Middle East and terrorism. His status as an academic defines his life, relationships and actions. To Ed, religion is more a matter of culture than belief. This outlook brings him into conflict with his eldest daughter Miriam, who, as a young medical student, embraces traditional Jewish observance. Most of Ed's stories revolve around his internal conflicts regarding religion, notably his clear disdain for the conference to which he is invited, where rather than present academic papers, the participants discuss their feelings.

=== Sarah Markowitz ===
Ed's wife Sarah gave up her academic career in order to follow and support her husband. She published one novel but now, in middle age, has come to be content with a less distinguished life: writing book reviews, teaching adult-ed courses in creative writing, and caring for her children and her mother-in-law. Sarah is the most potent voice of common sense in the Markowitz family. The novel sees her face the limitations of her life and the beginning of being an empty-nester.

== Awards and nominations ==
- Salon Magazine Book of the Year.

== External sources ==
- I. Goerlandt, "Take Us the Foxes. Some Notes on Allegra Goodman's 'One Down'"
