= Paul R. Mendes-Flohr =

American-Israeli historian (1941–2024)

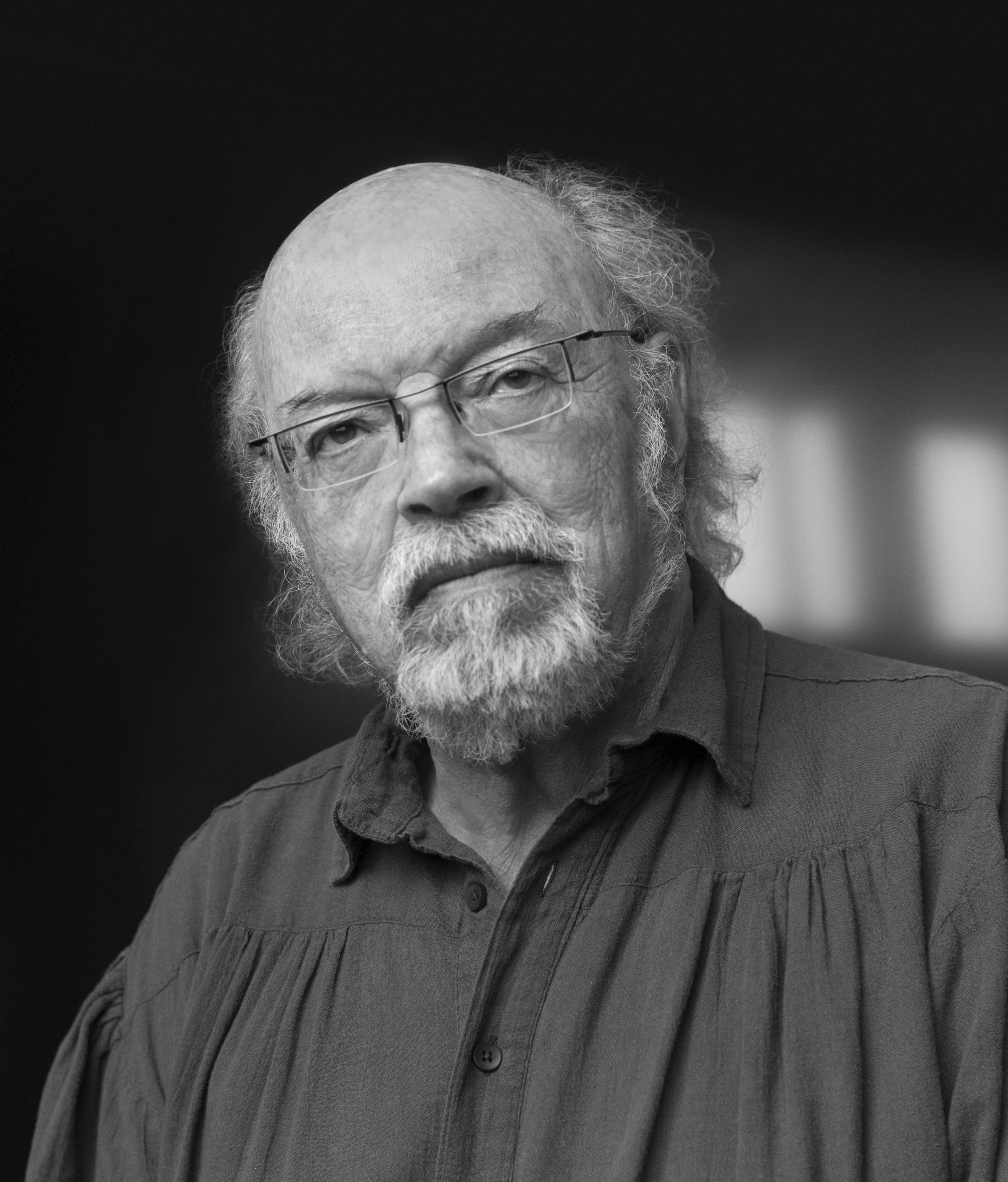
Mendes-Flohr in 2018

Paul R. Mendes-Flohr (Hebrew: פול מנדס-פלור; 17 April 1941 – 24 October 2024) was an American-Israeli scholar of modern Jewish thought. As an intellectual historian, Mendes-Flohr specialized in 19th and 20th-century Jewish thinkers, including Martin Buber, Franz Rosenzweig, Gershom Scholem, and Leo Strauss.

== Biography ==
Mendes-Flohr was born as Paul Flohr. He took his wife Rita’s maiden name of Mendes as the first part of his hyphenated last name. He held a doctorate from Brandeis University, which was supervised by Alexander Altmann, Nahum Glatzer, and Ben Halpern. Mendes-Flohr taught at the University of Chicago, where he was Dorothy Grant Maclear Professor Emeritus of Modern Jewish History and Thought. He was also Professor Emeritus of Jewish Thought at the Hebrew University of Jerusalem.

He was co-author and co-editor, with Jehuda Reinharz, of a book of modern Jewish history, The Jew in the Modern World: A Documentary History, and with Arthur A. Cohen, of a book on contemporary Jewish religious thought.

In 2019, Mendes-Flohr published a highly regarded Martin Buber biography entitled, Martin Buber: A Life of Faith and Dissent. The German translation appeared in 2022 and in Hebrew in 2023. His most recent work, Cultural Disjunctions: Post-Traditional Jewish Identities, was published in 2021.

In 2021, Mendes-Flohr began work on The Global Lehrhaus, an international platform for education and reflection on issues of common concern. The Global Lehrhaus was inspired by the Freies Jüdisches Lehrhaus (Free House of Jewish Learning), a center for continuing education established by Franz Rosenzweig, and later directed by Martin Buber.

Raised in Brooklyn, New York, Mendes-Flohr lived in Israel from 1970 with his wife, artist Rita Mendes-Flohr. He had two children, both also artists, and four grandchildren. Mendes-Flohr died on 24 October 2024, at the age of 83.

== Selected works ==
- Identität. Die zwei Seelen der deutschen Juden (in German).
- Cohen, Arthur A.; Mendes-Flohr, Paul, eds. (2009) [1987]. 20th Century Jewish Religious Thought: Original Essays on Critical Concepts, Movements, and Beliefs. The Jewish Publication Society. ISBN 978-0-8276-0892-4.
- From Mysticism to Dialogue: Martin Buber's Transformation of German Social Thought. Detroit: Wayne State University Press, 1989.
- Divided passions: Jewish intellectuals and the experience of modernity (1991).
- Mendes-Flohr, Paul R.; Reinharz, Jehuda, eds. (1995). The Jew in the Modern World: A Documentary History (2nd ed.). Oxford University Press. ISBN 0-19-507453-X. OCLC 30026590.
- German Jews: a dual identity (1999).
- Mendes-Flohr, Paul (2003) [2000]. "Secular Forms of Jewishness". In Neusner, Jacob; Avery-Peck, Alan J. (eds.). The Blackwell Companion to Judaism (Reprint ed.). Malden, Mass: Blackwell Publ. pp. 461–476. ISBN 1-57718-058-5.
- A land of two peoples: Martin Buber on Jews and Arabs Edited with commentary and a new preface by Paul R. Mendes-Flohr.
- Martin Buber: a contemporary perspective (2002).
- Mendes-Flohr, Paul (2005). "Judaism". In Thomas Riggs (ed.). Worldmark Encyclopedia of Religious Practices. Vol. 1. Farmington Hills, Mi: Thomson Gale. ISBN 9780787666118.
- Martin Buber: a life of faith and dissent (2019).
- Franz Rosenzweig and the Possibility of a Jewish Theology (forthcoming).
