= Melvin Jules Bukiet =

American novelist

- Occupations: Author; literary critic
- Writing career
- Notable awards: Edward Lewis Wallant Award (1992)

Signature
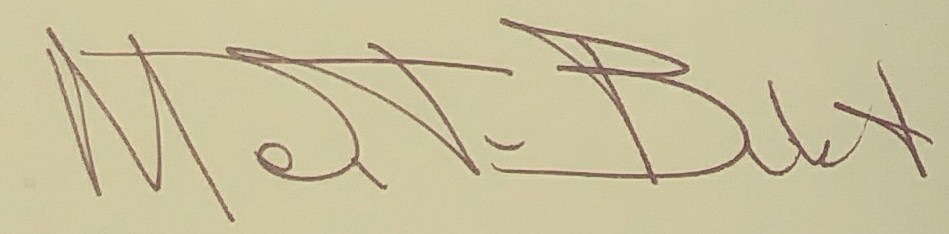

Melvin Jules Bukiet is an American author and literary critic. He has written a number of novels, including Sandman's Dust, After, While the Messiah Tarries, Signs and Wonders, Strange Fire, and A Faker's Dozen. He edited the collections Neurotica: Jewish Writers on Sex, Nothing Makes You Free, and Scribblers on the Roof. His short stories and non-fiction writing have appeared in The American Scholar, The New York Times, The Paris Review, and The LA Times. He appeared in The BBC's documentary on Auschwitz. He won the 1992 Edward Lewis Wallant Award.

In 1994, Bukiet became the co-owner of the KBG Bar on the Lower East Side of Manhattan, initiating a series of readings that turned the bar into a "literary hotspot" in the 1990s and 2000s.

In 2007, Bukiet was arrested for intervening in the arrest of one of his tenants for drinking from an open container on a city street. He was released with a misdemeanor charge after spending the night in the Tombs, Manhattan's notorious central prison.

Bukiet based his play "Runts" on the Sarah Lawrence 'sex cult' scandal. He told the New York Times that he was confident tenure would protect his job, but "[He was] not going to stand under any windows outside the administration building. That’s for sure."

The son of Holocaust survivors, Bukiet argued in a 2001 book that Holocaust writing should be the domain of survivors and their descendants. He later recanted that notion, saying "I think everybody should write about it". In 2024 Bukiet noted that the term 'genocide' was coined by Raphael Lemkin to describe the Holocaust. Bukiet described the popularization of the word 'genocide' to describe Israel's response to the October 7 Hamas-led attacks as "remarkable and repulsive".

== Bibliography ==
=== Fiction ===
- After (1996)
- Signs and Wonders (1999)
- Strange Fire (2001)
- Sandman's Dust
- Undertown (2013)

=== Anthologies ===
- Neurotica: Jewish Writers on Sex
- Nothing Makes You Free: Writings by Descendants of Jewish Holocaust Survivors
- Scribblers on the Roof: Contemporary Jewish Fiction
