= Gerald Shapiro (writer) =

American writer

Gerald David Shapiro (August 23, 1950 – October 15, 2011) was an American writer who had published three prize-winning books and was Cather Professor of English at the University of Nebraska–Lincoln. He was also a reader for Prairie Schooner. He lived in Lincoln, Nebraska with his wife, the writer Judith Slater.

== Education ==
He received his B.A. and M.A. degrees from the University of Kansas and M.F.A. from the MFA Program for Poets & Writers at the University of Massachusetts Amherst.

== Academic positions ==
- University of Nebraska–Lincoln
- Harris Center for Judaic Studies

== Awards ==
Honor Award in Fiction from The Nebraska Center for the Book and the Ohio State University Prize in Short Fiction and the Pushcart Prize for Fiction and the Edward Lewis Wallant Award for Jewish Fiction. He has also been a finalist for the 2000 National Jewish Book Award for Fiction. Also won a Merit Award from the Nebraska Arts Council's Individual Artists Fellowships program.

== Works ==
His stories have appeared in Ploughshares, Witness, The Kenyon Review, Gettysburg Review, Missouri Review, Quarterly West, Southern Review.

== Books published ==
- Shapiro, Gerald (2004). Little Men. Ohio State University Press. ISBN 978-0-8142-0960-8.
- Shapiro, Gerald (January 2004). Bad Jews and Other Stories. Zoland Books. ISBN 978-0-8032-9312-0. (reprint University of Nebraska Press, 2004, ISBN 978-0-8032-9312-0)
- Shapiro, Gerald (1993). From Hunger. University of Missouri Press. ISBN 978-0-8262-0863-7. "Gerald Shapiro."

=== Edited ===
- Gerald Shapiro, ed. (1998). American Jewish fiction: a century of stories. University of Nebraska Press. ISBN 978-0-8032-9252-9. "Gerald Shapiro."
