= Ayelet Tsabari =

Israeli-Canadian writer

Ayelet Tsabari (Hebrew: איילת צברי; Petach Tikvah, Israel, May 24, 1973) is an Israeli–Canadian writer and photographer.

== Biography ==
She was born in Israel into a large family of Yemeni descent. She studied at the Simon Fraser University Writers' Studio and the University of Guelph MFA program in Creative Writing. Her first book, the collection of short stories The Best Place on Earth, was published by HarperCollins Canada in 2013, and by Penguin Random House in the US in March 2016.

The Best Place on Earth was the recipient of the 2015 Sami Rohr Prize, the 2016 Edward Lewis Wallant, and was long listed for the Frank O'Connor International Short Story Award in 2013. The book was a New York Times Book Review Editors' Choice, a Kirkus Review Best Debut Fiction of 2016, and has been published internationally.

Tsabari's second book, the memoir in essays The Art of Leaving, was published by HarperCollins Canada and by Penguin Random House in the US in February 2019. The book won Canadian Jewish Literary Award for Memoir and was a finalist for the Hilary Weston Writers' Trust Prize for Nonfiction. Essays from the book have won several awards including a National Magazine Award (Silver) and a Western Magazine Award in Canada.

Her debut novel, Songs for the Brokenhearted, came out in 2024. It tells about Zohara, whose parents immigrated to Israel from Yemen in 1950 with hopes of a "land of milk and honey", only to face prejudice and hardship, and then—worst of all—having their infant child abducted, a story that affected many of the Jews brought in from Muslim countries, and was yet continually denied by official and non-official channels alike. When Zohara learns of her mother's death, she returns to Israel from New York, where she is failing at both her marriage and her doctoral dissertation. She finds herself discovering things about her mother's life she'd never imagined, and which bring her to discover more about herself. The novel deals with issues of identity, language, naming, ethnic discrimination, and mother–daughter relationships.

The Kirkus review calls Songs for the Brokenhearted "A timely, well-crafted tale, imbued with cultural and personal sorrow." Rita D. Jacobs, in a Project Muse review, wrote of the novel that "At every turn in this novel, Tsabari is in control and delivers an enthralling, beautifully written, and historically complex tale." Publishers Weekly praised the debut novel as "heartfelt and lyrical", and though the review opines that "at times the historical background overshadows the central narrative", that Tsabari, for the most part "artfully plays up the religious and secular contrasts between East and West, and her well-developed characters, dramatic plot twists, and rich descriptions of Tel Aviv will keep readers turning the pages. This is transportive."

Tsabari won the National Jewish Book Award for Fiction and the Association of Jewish Libraries Jewish Fiction Award for Songs for the Brokenhearted.

Her reviews, essays, and op-eds have appeared in The New York Times, The Globe and Mail, Foreign Policy, The Forward, and The National Post.

She teaches creative writing at the University of King's College MFA Program, and in the MFA creative writing program at the University of Guelph.

Tsabari lives in Tel Aviv with her husband and daughter.
