= Dictation: A Quartet =

2008 short story collection by Cynthia Ozick

First edition

Dictation: A Quartet (2008) is the seventh collection of short stories by American Author Cynthia Ozick.

== Synopsis ==
Dictation
The secretaries of Henry James and Joseph Conrad have a brief lesbian affair, and hatch a scheme to switch a paragraph from each of their bosses' new works.

Actors
An ageing Jewish actor with an Irish-sounding stage name lands the role of King Lear in an off-Broadway play written by the daughter of a famous Yiddish performer. Originally published in The New Yorker, and later in Cynthia Ozick Collected Stories.

At Fumicaro
An American man travels to the fictional town of Fumicaro, Italy, for a conference on Catholicism. While there, he meets a young chambermaid who is pregnant out of wedlock. He decides to marry her and take her back home to New York. The story takes place in the 1930s, after Benito Mussolini has taken power in the country. The characters in the story portray an eerie ambivalence to the idea of fascism. Originally published in The New Yorker, and later in Cynthia Ozick Collected Stories.

What Happened to the Baby
A young woman is directed to take care of her uncle, an eccentric man in the middle of creating a new universal language called "GNU," following his divorce. Originally published in The Atlantic, and later in Cynthia Ozick Collected Stories.

== Reception ==
Michael Upchurch of the Seattle Times stated Ozick "hits a peak of verve and acuity" and that Dictation offered "an ideal introduction" to her work. Abraham Socher in Commentary wrote that Dictation distills the theme of "tension between the monotheistic ban on idolatry and the desire to usurp God by creating beauty... despite the fact that its best stories are not ostensibly about Jews or Judaism at all". For the Publishers Weekly reviewer, it was a "carefully honed, sharply intelligent new collection of four stories", which showed "Ozick at the height of her stylistic powers".
