= Kenneth Bonert =

South African-Canadian writer

- Born: 1972; Johannesburg, South Africa
- Occupations: novelist, short stories
- Writing career
- Period: 2000s–present
- Notable work: The Lion Seeker

Kenneth Bonert (born 1972) is a South African-Canadian writer. His debut novel The Lion Seeker won both the 2013 National Jewish Book Award for Outstanding Debut Fiction and the 2013 Edward Lewis Wallant Award. The Lion Seeker was also a shortlisted nominee for the 2013 Governor General's Award for English-language Fiction, and the 2013 Amazon.ca First Novel Award, and was runner up for the 2015 Sami Rohr Prize for Jewish Literature. Bonert's second novel, The Mandela Plot, was released in 2018. It was a finalist for the National Jewish Book Award for Fiction (JJ Greenberg Memorial Award).

Bonert has previously published short stories, including the Journey Prize nominee "Packers and Movers", as well as a novella, Peacekeepers, 1995, which appeared in McSweeney's.

== Early life ==
Bonert was born and raised in Johannesburg, South Africa. He emigrated to Toronto, Ontario in 1989 with his parents. He studied journalism at Ryerson University.
