= Intuition (novel) =

2006 novel by Allegra Goodman

- Author: Allegra Goodman
- Language: English
- Publication date: 2006

Intuition is a 2006 critically acclaimed novel written by Allegra Goodman. The plot centers on the happenings at the Philpott Institute, a cancer research lab in desperate need of funding. Controversy engulfs the lab when Cliff Bannaker, a youthful postdoc student, appears to fabricate results to an experiment.
