= Judy Budnitz =

American writer (born 1973)

- Born: 1973 (age 51–52); Atlanta, Georgia, U.S.
- Occupation: Writer
- Education: Harvard University; New York University (MFA)
- Notable awards: Rona Jaffe Foundation Writers' Award (1995); Edward Lewis Wallant Award (2000)

Judy Budnitz (born 1973) is an American writer. She grew up in Atlanta, Georgia, attended Harvard University, was a fellow at Provincetown Fine Arts Work Center, and in 1998 received an MFA in creative writing from New York University.

== Bibliography ==
=== Novels ===
- If I Told You Once (1999)

=== Collections ===
- Flying Leap (1998)
- Nice Big American Baby (2005)

=== Anthologies containing stories by Judy Budnitz ===
- The Year's Best Fantasy and Horror Twelfth Annual Collection (1999)
- "The Better of McSweeney's Volume One - Issues 1 -10" (2005)
- " The Best American Non Required Reading" (2006)

=== Awards ===
- 1995 Rona Jaffe Foundation Writers' Award
- Shortlisted for the 2000 Orange Prize (If I Told You Once)
- 2000 Edward Lewis Wallant Award
- 2005 Lannan Literary Fellowship
