= Kaaterskill Falls (novel) =

1998 novel by Allegra Goodman

- Kaaterskill Falls, paperback edition
- Author: Allegra Goodman
- Language: English
- Genre: literary fiction
- Publisher: The Dial Press
- Publication date: August 10, 1998
- Publication place: United States
- Media type: Print (Hardback, Paperback)
- Pages: 336
- ISBN: 0-385-32390-5
- OCLC: 42242872

Kaaterskill Falls is a 1998 novel by Allegra Goodman, set in a small Orthodox Jewish community in the Catskill Mountains during summers in the mid-1970s. The location is based on the town of Tannersville, New York, where Goodman spent summers with her family. Like its fictional counterpart, Tannersville at the time was a summer home for the German Jews of Washington Heights, Manhattan.

== Plot ==
Kaaterskill Falls spans two years (from the summer of 1976 to the summer of 1978) in the life of a small community in upstate New York. Most of the characters are summer residents, Orthodox Jews whose lives center around the local Orthodox synagogue. Others are year-round residents, both Christians and secular Jews, whose local roots run deep and who coexist in uneasy symbiosis with the summer people.

Elizabeth Shulman, a thirtysomething wife and mother of five daughters, is growing restless with her prescribed role as a woman within the strict Kirshner sect. She conceives the dream of opening a kosher grocery store to serve the summer residents of Kaaterskill. Her store is a smashing success, but Elizabeth's perceived laxity in adhering to its rabbinic certification earns the distrust of Isaiah and Rachel Kirshner. Meanwhile, Elizabeth learns that she is pregnant for the sixth time. Elizabeth experiences a closing in of boundaries as Rabbi Isaiah Kirshner withdraws his permission for her grocery store and a new baby binds her once again to home. Ultimately, she takes a job as an assistant at a grocery store in Washington Heights (where the Shulmans live for most of the year) in order to learn the business.

Another plot line revolves around strife within the Melish family. Middle-aged Andras Melish struggles with a sense of distance from his young, lively, somewhat dictatorial wife, Nina. He forges an unlikely clandestine friendship with the reclusive Una Darmstadt-Cooper. Meanwhile, teenage Renee Melish rebels against her mother's expectations for her and forms an unsuitable friendship with a gutsy Syrian girl, Stephanie Fawess. Renee also attracts the attention of a local boy, Ira Rubin.

Still another plot line concerns the Kirshner rabbinic succession. The elderly, widowed Rav Kirshner is afflicted with Parkinson's disease but remains reluctant to hand the reins of power over to his faithful but plodding son Isaiah. Isaiah's ambitious wife, Rachel, resents this, just as she resents her father-in-law's deep affection for his brilliant elder son Jeremy, who left the Kirshner sect to become a college professor. Rav Kirshner dies mid-way through the novel and Rabbi Isaiah launches a vigorous crackdown on perceived laxities within the sect.

== Characters ==
- Isaac Shulman, a quiet, mild-mannered Kirshner Jew, and his wife Elizabeth. They have five daughters (Chani, Malki, Rochel, Sorah, Brocha) when the book begins, and a sixth (Chaya) is born in early 1978.
- Andras Melish, a middle-aged importer, and his vivacious but bossy young wife, Nina. They have a teenage daughter, Renee, and a son. The Melishes are close to Andras's two elderly, childless sisters, Eva and Maja, and their husbands.
- Cecil Birnbaum, the gadfly of Kaaterskill's Orthodox Jewish community, and his bride, Beatrix, a mathematician. They are close friends of Jeremy Kirshner. Cecil's sister Regina, who lives in California, also appears in a few scenes.
- Rav Elijah Kirshner, the esteemed elderly rabbi of the Kirshner sect. He has two sons: the brilliant, rebellious Jeremy, a college professor, and the quiet, dutiful Isaiah, who eventually succeeds his father as the Rav of the Kirshner sect. Isaiah is married to Rachel, a bright but rigid woman who acts as the power behind the throne, and they have one son. The character is loosely based on Rabbi Dr. Joseph Breuer who, like his fictional counterpart, spent summers in Tannersville and lead the German Jewish community of Washington Heights until his death in 1980.
- Judge Taylor, a local political leader

Ernestine Schermerhorn, the local librarian and gossip-monger

Michael King, an ambitious local builder

Stephanie Fawess, a fast-talking, gutsy, political girl who strikes up a friendship with Renee, to the consternation of Nina Melish

Ira Rubin, a teenage Kaaterskill boy who has a crush on Renee Melish

Una Darmstadt-Cooper, a recluse

== Honors and awards ==
- Finalist for the National Book Award for Fiction (1998)
- A New York Times Notable Book (1998)

== See also ==
- Tannersville, New York
- Kaaterskill Falls
