= Intuition (game) =

Board game published by Applied Intuition, Inc. in 1990

Intuition is a board game published by Applied Intuition, Inc. in 1990.

== Gameplay ==
Intuition is a memory party game.

== Reviews ==
- Jeux & Stratégie NF7
- Games #103
- 1991 Games 100 in Games
