= List of Kobato chapters =

The chapters of Kobato are written and illustrated by Clamp, and first appeared as a serial in the Shogakukan's Monthly Sunday Gene-X magazine. In 2006 the series was then moved to the Newtype by the company Kadokawa Shoten. The manga ended serialization in the August 2011 issue from Newtype published in July 2011. Kadokawa released the tankōbon volumes from December 26, 2007, to August 26, 2011.

On April 4, 2007, Newtype USA announced a special agreement with Clamp to exclusively serialize Kobato., in the pages of the magazine. Kobato began its serial run in the June 2007 issue of Newtype USA, and was to continue its exclusive serialization through the May 2008 issue, comprising 12 installments in total. However Newtype USA ceased publication with the February 2008 issue, having serialised 9 of the 12 installments. On July 24, 2009, Yen Press announced that they had acquired the license to publish Kobato in English in North America during their panel at San Diego Comic-Con. The manga was released in North America in May 2010 in honor of CLAMP's 20th anniversary. In Europe, the series was licensed by Pika Édition for France, JPF for Poland, and Norma Editorial for Spain.

== Volume list ==
| No. | Original release date | Original ISBN | English release date | English ISBN |
|---|---|---|---|---|
| 01 | December 26, 2007 | 978-4-04-713998-5 | May 18, 2010 | 978-0-316-08536-6 |
"Ch. 1: The First Test"; "Ch. 2: The Secrets of Nabe?!"; "Ch. 3: Kobato's Christmas"; "Ch. 4: A Wonderful Otoshidama"; "Ch. 5: Chocolate and Valentines"; "Ch. 6: What Does Ohanami Mean?"; "Ch. 7: Kobato on a Rainy Day"; "Ch. 8: Ioryogi-san and Mister Beer"; "Ch. 9: The Test Results are In?!"; "Ch. 10: Please Let Me Heal You!"
| 02 | April 26, 2008 | 978-4-04-715058-4 | May 18, 2010 | 978-0-316-08540-3 |
"Ch. 11: The Unhealed Heart"; "Ch. 12: A Single Precious Fragment"; "Ch. 13: Women's Intuition"; "Ch. 14: Let's Have a Bazaar"; "Ch. 15: Anything That I Can Do"; "Ch. 16: Laughing, Crying"; "Ch. 17: A New Decision"
| 03 | December 26, 2008 | 978-4-04-715146-8 | September 28, 2010 | 978-0-316-08541-0 |
"Ch. 18: "Loan Shark-san"; "Ch. 19: Kobato's Decision"; "Ch. 20: Words of Healing"; "Ch. 21: Unseen Feelings"; "Ch. 22: The Bear's Baumkuchen Shop"; "Ch. 23: Ginsei vs. Ioryogi"; "Ch. 24: Ioryogi-san in a Bind?!"; "Ch. 25: The Message from Genko"; "Ch. 26: Yomogi Kindergarten's Secret"; "Extra: A Day in the Life of Ioryogi-san"
| 04 | December 26, 2009 | 978-4-04-715363-9 | July 19, 2011 | 978-0-316-17818-1 |
"Ch. 27: A Letter from Him"; "Ch. 28: You Mustn't Hit Him!"; "Ch. 29: A Tale of Once Upon a Time"; "Ch. 30: When the Rain Cleared"; "Ch. 31: The Residents of the Other World"; "Ch. 32: Fujimoto's Worry"
| 05 | December 25, 2010 | 978-4-04-715584-8 | December 2011 | 978-0-316-19071-8 |
"Ch. 33: Kobato's Worry"; "Ch. 34: Love"; "Ch. 35: True Feelings"; "Ch. 36: For You"
| 06 | August 26, 2011 | 978-4-04-715741-5 | June 2012 | 978-0-316-21389-9 |
"Ch. 37: Wish"; "Ch. 38: ...Farewell"; "Ch. 39: Something Very Precious
