= Alvin Lustig =

American graphic and interior designer

- Born: February 8, 1915; Denver, Colorado, US
- Died: December 5, 1955 (aged 40); New York City, US
- Occupations: Graphic designer, Interior designer, typographer
- Spouse: Elaine Lustig Cohen (m.1948)

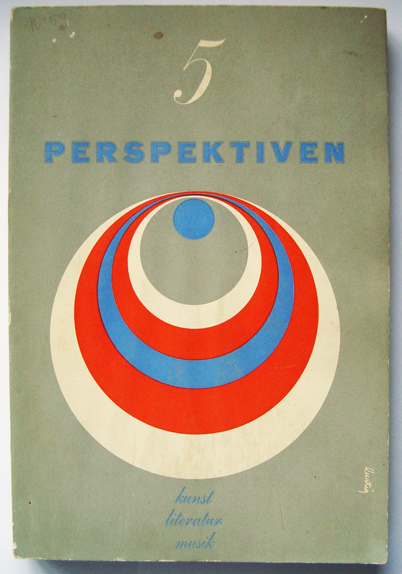
Cover of Perspektiven magazine, issue 5, S. Fischer verlag, Frankfurt

Sample of the typeface HWT Lustig Elements

Alvin Lustig (February 8, 1915 – December 5, 1955) was an American book designer, graphic designer and typeface designer. Lustig has been honored by the American Institute of Graphic Arts and the Art Directors Club Hall of Fame for his significant contributions to American design.

== Biography ==
He was born on February 8, 1915, to Harry Lustig and Jeanette Schamus in Denver, Colorado.

Lustig studied design at Los Angeles City College, Art Center College of Design, but did not obtain a degree. In 1935, he spent three months studying independently with architect Frank Lloyd Wright at his Taliesin studio. The next year, he worked with French painter Jean Charlot. He began his career designing book jackets in 1937 in Los Angeles, California. In 1944 he became Director of Visual Research for Look magazine. He also designed for Fortune, and Girl Scouts of the United States.

He appeared in filmmaker Maya Deren's At Land (1944), a 15-minute silent experimental film. Lustig's character is a man playing chess against himself.

In addition to his many contributions to graphic design, Lustig was an accomplished interior and architectural designer. In 1949, he designed what has become known as the "Lustig Chair" for Paramount Furniture in Beverly Hills, CA. His original design continues to inspire modern interiors and replications of the chair are still in production. Lustig's interior design work also influenced younger designers like Paul Tuttle.

Josef Albers invited him to teach graphic design at Black Mountain College in 1945, and again at Yale in 1951. Lustig taught at Yale through 1953 as a Visiting Critic in graphic arts, and helped shape its graduate program in design, the first such program of its kind.

=== New Directions ===
Lustig maintained a successful professional relationship with New Directions Publishing for almost a decade, producing some of his most iconic and innovative work for the independent publishing company. He designed more than seventy dust jackets for the New Classics literary series from 1945 until his death in 1955. His abstract designs incorporated a modern design sensibility with a groundbreaking approach to typeface design and the unconventional dust jacket became a hallmark of New Directions publications. His artwork was featured on the covers of classic works of modernist literature, including the works of James Joyce, Gertrude Stein, William Carlos Williams, and Ezra Pound. Several Tennessee Williams plays were published by New Directions during this period and Lustig's art was included on the first edition covers of these works, including A Streetcar Named Desire and Cat on a Hot Tin Roof.

=== Blindness and death ===
Lustig developed diabetes as a teenager. As a result of diabetes by 1954 he was virtually blind. Ivan Chermayeff apprenticed under Lustig after he had lost his sight, and later recounted that he would essentially dictate a design: "...Indent 12 picas, flush left. Use 10 or 12 point Futura Gothic extended lower case..."

Lustig developed Kimmelstiel-Wilson syndrome, an incurable kidney disease connected to diabetes. He died at the age of 40 of diabetes-related complications on December 4, 1955.

Elaine Lustig Cohen, Lustig's wife and fellow graphic designer, took over his New York City design firm after his death on December 5, 1955. She was awarded an AIGA Medal in 2011 for her contributions to American graphic design.

== Legacy ==
Lustig was inducted into the Art Directors Club Hall of Fame in 1986.

In 1993, the American Institute of Graphic Arts awarded Lustig a posthumous AIGA Medal. AIGA awards designers whose work has had "significant impact on the practice of graphic design in the United States."

In 2013, New Directions announced that they would be reissuing a selection of their classic titles with the original Lustig cover designs. In May 2013, New Directions began selling a series of postcards and other stationery featuring the artwork of Alvin Lustig.

The collective works of Alvin Lustig and Elaine Lustig Cohen were showcased in a special exhibit at the AIGA National Design Center in New York City from December 2010 to February 2013. The exhibit, titled The Lustigs: A Cover Story, was the first to show the work of Alvin and Elaine Lustig together in the same collection.
