= The Pawnbroker =

1961 novel by Edward Lewis Wallant

First edition (Harcourt Brace & World)

The Pawnbroker (1961), a novel by Edward Lewis Wallant, which tells the story of Sol Nazerman, a concentration camp survivor who suffers flashbacks of his past Nazi imprisonment as he tries to cope with his daily life operating a pawn shop in East Harlem. It was adapted into a motion picture with the same name by Sidney Lumet.

Nazerman is a bulky man, 45 years old, who before the war had been a professor at the University of Kraków. He has dealt with his trauma by deliberately shutting down his emotions, with the result that he sees everyone around him, especially the desperate people who come into his shop, as "scum." Nazerman is plagued by nightmares and headaches stemming from the physical and mental trauma of his wartime experiences, in which his wife was forced into prostitution and his son drowned in the excrement of a cattle car on the way to the concentration camp.

Having lost his family in the camps, Sol now lives with his sister Bertha in the suburb of Mt. Vernon. She has married a mid-westerner and prizes her "American"-looking blonde haired daughter over her more Jewish-looking son. He is also taking care of his best friend's widow, Tessie, and her dying father, Mendel. Sol supports both families through the pawnshop, which is in reality a front for Mafia money.

The novel deals not only with the after-effects of the camp experience, but also with making a parallel between the desperation of the residents of Harlem and that of the people in the camps. The major characters include Sol's Latino assistant, Jesus Ortiz, and a recently arrived social worker, Marilyn Birchfield. There are numerous minor characters who are local Harlem residents, some of whom treat Sol with affection and receive only indifference in return.

The climax of the story occurs on the anniversary of Sol's family's death and forces him to confront his own emotions, including his guilt over having survived and his desire to die. The novel details the relationship with Sol's nephew, a troubled young man with whom he achieves a bond.
