= The Pagan Rabbi and Other Stories =

1971 short story collection by Cynthia Ozick

- First edition (publ. Knopf)
- Author: Cynthia Ozick
- Language: English
- Publisher: Knopf
- Publication date: 1971
- ISBN: 0-394-46970-4 (first edition)
- Dewey Decimal: 813.54
- LC Class: PZ4.O994 Pag

The Pagan Rabbi and Other Stories (1971) is the second book and first collection of stories published by American author Cynthia Ozick. "The Pagan Rabbi" and "Envy; or, Yiddish in America", along with an interview with the author, were later collected as an audio book in 1989 read by Ron Rifkin and Mitchell Greenberg.

== Stories ==
- "The Pagan Rabbi"
- "Envy; or, Yiddish in America"
- "The Suitcase"
- "The Dock-Witch"
- "The Doctor's Wife"
- "The Butterfly and the Traffic Light"
- "Virility"

== Synopsis ==
The Pagan Rabbi

Approximately 9,000 words, also published in Cynthia Ozick Collected Stories. The story is about a rabbi, Isaac Kornfeld, who had just committed suicide by hanging himself in a public park. He is remembered by his widow for having recently discovered a passion for nature and his widow felt that he left his beliefs of Judaism for Paganism.

Envy; or, Yiddish in America

Approximately 15,000 words, also published in Cynthia Ozick Collected Stories. The story is about an American Yiddish poet who is bitterly jealous of his more-successful contemporary. The main character also has a personal vendetta against televangelists who are attempting to convert Jews to Christianity.

The Suitcase

Approximately 7,000 words, also published in Cynthia Ozick Collected Stories. About a retired Imperial German fighter pilot, whose son is a well-recognized artist. One of the artist's friends finds that her purse has been stolen, and they try to figure out who stole it. The woman who lost her purse accuses the father of the artist, because he was in the Imperial German army.

The Butterfly and the Traffic Light

Approximately 3,000 words, also published in Cynthia Ozick Collected Stories. The story is basically an argument between a college girl and her professor about how traffic lights are the icons of American cities.
