= Steve Stern (writer) =

American novelist

- Born: Steve J. Stern; 1947 (age 78–79); Memphis, Tennessee, U.S.
- Education: Rhodes College, University of Arkansas
- Occupation: Author
- Writing career
- Notable awards: Pushcart Writers' Choice Award (1983), Edward Lewis Wallant Award (1987), National Jewish Book Award (1999)

Steve J. Stern (born 1947) is an American author from Memphis, Tennessee. Much of his work draws inspiration from Yiddish folklore.

== Biography ==
Stern was born in Memphis, Tennessee in 1947, the son of a grocer. He received a BA from Rhodes College, after which he left Memphis to travel the US and Europe, ending up on a hippie commune in the Ozarks. He went on to study writing in the MFA program at the University of Arkansas.

Stern subsequently lived in a squatters' community in London, England, before returning to Memphis in his thirties to accept a job at The Center for Southern Folklore. There he learned about the city's old Jewish ghetto, called The Pinch. At this time, he steeped himself in Yiddish folklore and mastered the Yiddish language so he could collect the stories of the old Russian-Jewish immigrants of this neighborhood before they died.

Stern left Memphis for good in 1986 and eventually moved to upstate New York, teaching creative writing at Skidmore College for thirty years. He was also a Fulbright lecturer at Bar Ilan University in Israel, the Moss Chair of Creative Writing at the University of Memphis, and Lecturer in Jewish Studies for the Prague Summer Seminars.

He published his first book, the story collection Isaac and the Undertaker's Daughter, which was based in The Pinch, in 1983. It won the Pushcart Writers' Choice Award. His book Lazar Malkin Enters Heaven won the Edward Lewis Wallant Award in 1987, presented to a writer whose work is considered to have significance for American Jews.

Stern's 2000 collection The Wedding Jester won the National Jewish Book Award in 1999, and his novel The Angel of Forgetfulness was named one of the best books of 2005 by The Washington Post.

Stern splits his time between Brooklyn and Balston Spa, New York.

== Works ==
- Isaac and the Undertaker's Daughter (Lost Roads Publishers, 1983)
- The Moon & Ruben Shein (August House, 1984)
- Lazar Malkin Enters Heaven (Viking, 1986)
- Mickey and the Golem (St. Lukes Press, 1986) (children's book)
- Hershel and the Beast (Ion Books, 1987) (children's book)
- Harry Kaplan's Adventures Under Ground (Ticknor & Fields, 1991)
- A Plague of Dreamers: Three Novellas (Scribner's, 1994)
- The Wedding Jester (Graywolf Press, 1999)
- The Angel of Forgetfulness (Viking, 2006)
- The North of God (Melville House Publishing, 2008) ISBN 978-1-933633-56-5
- The Frozen Rabbi (Algonquin Books of Chapel Hill, 2010)
- The Book of Mischief (Graywolf Press, 2012)
- The Pinch (Graywolf Press, 2015)
- The Village Idiot (Melville House, 2022)
- A Fool's Kabbalah (Melville House, 2025)
