= Allegra Goodman =

American writer

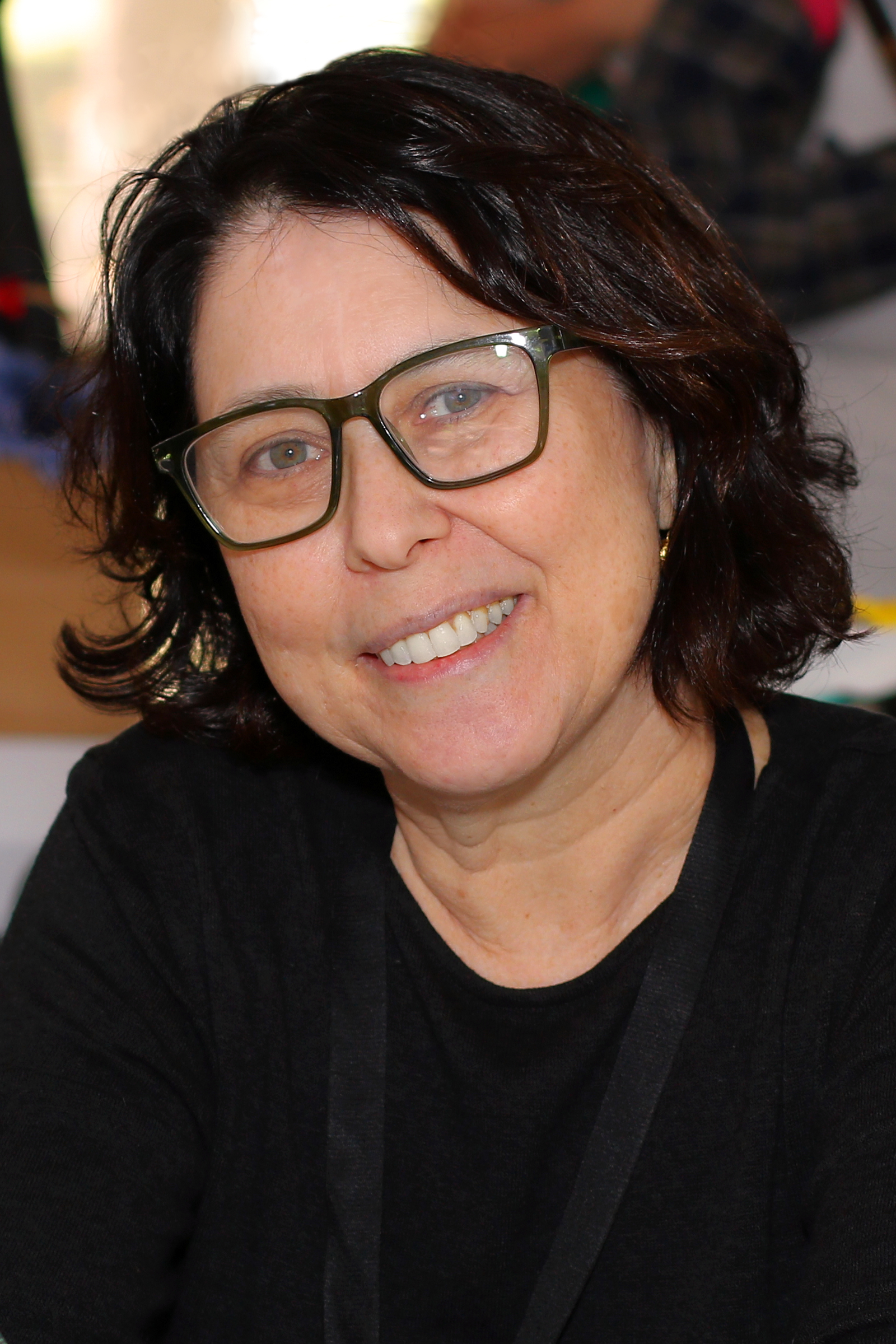
- Goodman at the 2025 Texas Book Festival
- Born: 5 July 1967 (age 59); New York City, U.S.
- Education: Harvard University (AB); Stanford University (PhD)
- Occupation: Novelist
- Spouse: David Karger
- Children: 4
- Writing career
- Period: 1989-current
- Genre: Literary fiction
- Website: allegragoodman.com

Allegra Goodman (born 5 July 1967) is an American writer based in Cambridge, Massachusetts.

== Early life and education ==
Allegra Goodman was born in Brooklyn, New York, and raised in Hawaii. She was brought up as a Conservative Jew. Her mother, Madeleine Goodman, who died in 1996, was a professor of genetics and women's studies, then assistant vice president at the University of Hawaii at Manoa for many years, before moving on to Vanderbilt University in the 1990s. Her father, Lenn E. Goodman, is a professor of philosophy at Vanderbilt and the author of a dozen books.

Goodman wrote and illustrated her first novel at the age of seven.

Goodman graduated from Punahou School in 1985. She then went to Harvard University, where she earned a BA degree. She then went on to do graduate work at Stanford University, where she earned a Ph.D. degree in English literature in 1996.

== Writing ==
Goodman's younger sister, Paula Fraenkel, is an oncologist. Fraenkel's experience in research labs is one of the inspirations for Goodman's 2006 novel Intuition.

Her short story "La Vita Nuova" was selected for The Best American Short Stories 2011 and was broadcast on Public Radio International's Selected Shorts in February 2012.

Her novel Isola was named one of People's best books of February 2025. It was included in New York Times' 100 Notable Books of 2025 list and Time magazine's 100 Must-Read Books of 2025 list.

== Personal life ==
Goodman met her husband, David Karger, at Harvard University. Both were regulars at Harvard Hillel, and prayed in Harvard Hillel Orthodox Minyan. Goodman and Karger live in Cambridge, Massachusetts, where Karger is a professor in computer science at MIT. They have four adult children, three boys and a girl. They are traditionally Jewish in their observance.

== Awards and honors ==
Year	Nominated work	Award	Category	Result	Ref
1991	—	Whiting Award	Fiction	Won	
1998	Kaaterskill Falls	National Book Award	Fiction	Shortlisted	
2009	Intuition	Wellcome Book Prize	—	Shortlisted	
2018	"F.A.Q.s"	Sunday Times Short Story Award	—	Shortlisted	

== Published works ==
=== Novels ===
- Kaaterskill Falls (The Dial Press 1998) ISBN 0-385-32389-1
- Paradise Park (The Dial Press 2001) ISBN 0-385-33416-8
- Intuition (The Dial Press 2006) ISBN 0-385-33612-8
- The Other Side of the Island (Razorbill 2008) ISBN 978-1-59514-196-5
- The Cookbook Collector (The Dial Press 2010) ISBN 978-0-385-34085-4
- The Chalk Artist (The Dial Press 2017) ISBN 978-1-400-06987-3
- Sam (The Dial Press 2023) ISBN 978-0-593-59682-1
- Isola (The Dial Press 2025) ISBN 978-0-593-73008-9
- This Is Not About Us (The Dial Press 2026) ISBN 978-0-593-44785-7

=== Short fiction ===
Collections

- Total Immersion (Harper & Row 1989) ISBN 0-06-015998-7
- The Family Markowitz (Farrar, Straus and Giroux 1996) ISBN 0-374-15321-3

Stories (Note: Short stories unless otherwise noted.)

- Goodman, Allegra (March 4, 1991). "Onionskin". The New Yorker.
- Goodman, Allegra (January 5, 1992). "The Wedding of Henry Markowitz". The New Yorker.
- Goodman, Allegra (November 8, 1992). "Fantasy Rose". The New Yorker.
- Goodman, Allegra (August 1, 1993). "Mosquitoes". The New Yorker.
- Goodman, Allegra (January 9, 1994). "Sarah". The New Yorker.
- Goodman, Allegra (July 6, 1997). "The Closet". The New Yorker.
- Goodman, Allegra (June 13, 1999). "The Local Production of Cinderella". The New Yorker.
- Goodman, Allegra (July 3, 2005). "Long-Distance Client". The New Yorker.
- Goodman, Allegra (April 26, 2010). "La Vita Nuova". The New Yorker.
- Goodman, Allegra (June 30, 2014). "Apple Cake". The New Yorker.
- Goodman, Allegra (September 4, 2017). "F.A.Q.s". The New Yorker.
- Goodman, Allegra (January 25, 2021). "A Challenge You Have Overcome". The New Yorker.
- Goodman, Allegra (February 20, 2023). "The Last Grownup". The New Yorker.
- Goodman, Allegra (September 22, 2024). "Ambrose". The New Yorker.
- Goodman, Allegra (January 4, 2026). "Deal-Breaker". The New Yorker.

———————
