= Cynthia Ozick =

American writer (born 1928)

- Born: April 17, 1928 (age 98); New York City, U.S.
- Education: Hunter College High School; New York University (BA); Ohio State University (MA)
- Occupation: Writer
- Spouse: Bernard Hallote (died 2017)
- Writing career
- Period: 1966–present
- Notable awards: American Academy of Arts and Letters, 1988

Cynthia Ozick (born April 17, 1928) is an American short story writer, novelist, and essayist.

== Biography ==
Cynthia Ozick was born in New York City. The second of two children, Ozick was raised in the Bronx by her parents, Celia (née Regelson) and William Ozick. They were Jewish immigrants from Russia, and proprietors of the Park View Pharmacy in the Pelham Bay neighborhood. She is the niece of the Hebraist Abraham Regelson.

She attended Hunter College High School in Manhattan. She earned her B.A. from New York University and went on to study at Ohio State University, where she completed an M.A. in English literature, focusing on the novels of Henry James.

She appears briefly in the film Town Bloody Hall, where she asks Norman Mailer, "in Advertisements for Myself you said, quote, 'A good novelist can do without everything but the remnant of his balls'. For years and years I've been wondering, Mr. Mailer, when you dip your balls in ink, what color ink is it?".

Ozick was married to Bernard Hallote, a lawyer, until his death in 2017. Their daughter, Rachel Hallote, is a professor of history at SUNY Purchase and head of its Jewish studies program.

Yale University has acquired her literary papers. A special issue of Studies in Jewish American Literature published in 2024 examines her contributions to the art of non-fiction.

== Literary themes ==
Ozick's fiction and essays are often about Jewish American life, but she also writes about politics, history, and literary criticism. In addition, she has written and translated poetry.

Henry James occupies a central place in her fiction and nonfiction. The critic Adam Kirsch wrote that her "career-long agon with Henry James... reaches a kind of culmination in Foreign Bodies, her polemical rewriting of The Ambassadors."

The Holocaust and its aftermath is also a dominant theme. For instance in "Who Owns Anne Frank?" she writes that the diary's true meaning has been distorted and eviscerated "by blurb and stage, by shrewdness and naiveté, by cowardice and spirituality, by forgiveness and indifference." Much of her work explores the disparaged self, the reconstruction of identity after immigration, trauma and movement from one class to another.

She has also written on the subject of Jewish feminism. Her 1976 essay “Notes Toward Finding the Right Question” examined emergent Jewish feminist theology and argued that women’s inequality was not in question in Scripture, but in the misogyny of halakha. Her essay “Torah as the Matrix of Feminism” argued that the basis for feminism and gender equality emerged directly from the theology of the Torah.

Ozick says that writing is not a choice but "a kind of hallucinatory madness. You will do it no matter what. You can't not do it." She sees the "freedom in the delectable sense of making things up" as coexisting with the "torment" of writing. On the occasion of the publication of In a Yellow Wood, a collection from Everyman's Library of her short stories and essays, Ozick remarked on the "profound jubilation of writing...when you're carried away by unexpected forces."

== Awards and critical acclaim ==
In 1971, Ozick received the Edward Lewis Wallant Award and the National Jewish Book Award for her short story collection The Pagan Rabbi and Other Stories. For Bloodshed and Three Novellas, she received, in 1977, The National Jewish Book Award for Fiction. In 1997, she received the Diamonstein-Spielvogel Award for the Art of the Essay for Fame and Folly. Four of her stories won first prize in the O. Henry competition.

In 1986, she was selected as the first winner of the Rea Award for the Short Story. In 2000, she won the National Book Critics Circle Award for Quarrel & Quandary. Her novel Heir to the Glimmering World (2004) (published as The Bear Boy in the United Kingdom) won high literary praise. Ozick was on the shortlist for the 2005 Man Booker International Prize, and in 2008 she was awarded the PEN/Nabokov Award and the PEN/Malamud Award, which was established by Bernard Malamud's family to honor excellence in the art of the short story. Her novel Foreign Bodies was shortlisted for the Orange Prize (2012) and the Jewish Quarterly-Wingate Prize (2013).

The novelist David Foster Wallace called Ozick one of the greatest living American writers. She has been described as "the Athena of America's literary pantheon", the "Emily Dickinson of the Bronx", and "one of the most accomplished and graceful literary stylists of her time".

== Selected works ==
=== Novels ===
- Trust (1966)
- The Cannibal Galaxy (1983)
- The Messiah of Stockholm (1987)
- The Puttermesser Papers (1997)
- Heir to the Glimmering World (2004) (published in the United Kingdom in 2005 as The Bear Boy)
- Foreign Bodies (2010)
- Antiquities (2021)

=== Short fiction ===
Collections

- The Pagan Rabbi and Other Stories (1971)
- Bloodshed and Three Novellas (1976)
- Levitation: Five Fictions (1982)
- The Shawl (1989)
- Collected Stories (2007)
- Dictation: A Quartet (2008)
- Antiquities and Other Stories (2022)
- In a Yellow Wood: Selected Stories and Essays (2025)

Stories (Note: Short stories unless otherwise noted.)

Title	Year	First published	Reprinted/collected	Notes
The Coast of New Zealand	2021	Ozick, Cynthia (June 21, 2021). "The coast of New Zealand". The New Yorker. 97 (17): 50–57.	Antiquities and Other Stories	
The Biographer's Hat	2022	Ozick, Cynthia (March 7, 2022). "The Biographer's Hat". The New Yorker.	In a Yellow Wood: Selected Stories and Essays	
Late-Night-Radio Talk-Show Host Tells All	2023	Ozick, Cynthia (May 29, 2023). "Late-Night-Radio Talk-Show Host Tells All". The Atlantic.		
A French Doll	2023	Ozick, Cynthia (July 24, 2023). "A French Doll". The New Yorker.		
The Story of My Family	2024	Ozick, Cynthia (March 2024). "The Story of My Family". Commentary.	In a Yellow Wood: Selected Stories and Essays	
The Wife	2026	Ozick, Cynthia (January 2026). "The Wife". Jewish Review of Books.		

=== Drama ===
- Blue Light (1994)

=== Non-fiction ===
Essay collections

- All the World Wants the Jews Dead (1974)
- Art and Ardor (1983)
- Metaphor & Memory (1989)
- What Henry James Knew and Other Essays on Writers (1993)
- Fame & Folly: Essays (1996)
- "SHE: Portrait of the Essay as a warm body" (1998)
- Quarrel & Quandary (2000)
- The Din in the Head: Essays (2006)
- Critics, Monsters, Fanatics, and Other Literary Essays (2016)
- David Miller, ed. Letters of Intent: Selected Essays (2017)

Miscellaneous

- A Cynthia Ozick Reader (1996)
- The Complete Works of Isaac Babel (introduction 2001)
- Fistfuls of Masterpieces

=== Critical studies and reviews of Ozick's work ===
- 2000 The New York Times: "The Girl Who Would Be James" by John Sutherland (on Ozick's book Quarrel & Quandary)
- 2002 Partisan Review: "Cynthia Ozick, Aesthete" by Sanford Pinsker
- 2005 The Guardian: "The World is Not Enough" by Ali Smith (on Ozick's book The Bear Boy)
- 2006 The New York Times Book Review: "The Canon as Cannon", by Walter Kirn (on Ozick's book The Din in the Head)
- 2010 The New York Times Book Review: "Cynthia Ozick's Homage to Henry James", by Thomas Mallon (on Ozick's book Foreign Bodies)
- 2010 The New York Times Book Review: "A Jamesian Pays Tribute in a Retelling", by Charles McGrath (on Ozick's book Foreign Bodies)

———————

== See also ==
- Jewish American literature
