= Myrick (surname) =

- Language: English

Myrick is an English surname. Notable people with the surname include:

- Andrew Myrick (1832–1862), American frontier trader
- Bismarck Myrick (born 1940), American ambassador
- Bob Myrick (1952–2012), American baseball player
- Daniel Myrick (born 1963), American film director
- Don Myrick (1940–1993), American saxophonist
- Gary Myrick (b. ? ), American singer, songwriter, and guitarist
- Gary B. Myrick (b. ?), U.S. Senate officer
- Hannah Myrick (1871–1973), American physician
- Jalen Myrick (born 1995), American football player
- Julian Myrick (1880–1969), American insurance salesman and tennis promoter
- Leland Myrick (b. ? ), American author and illustrator
- Marie Louise Scudder Myrick (1854–1934), American newspaper editor and publisher
- Nathan Myrick (1822–1903), American city founder
- Spencer Myrick (1918–1991), American politician
- Sue Myrick (born 1941), American politician
- Susan Dowdell Myrick (1893–1978), American journalist, educator, author, and conservationist
- Svante Myrick (born 1987), American mayor
- Ford Myrick (born 2014), All American boy

== See also ==
- Myrick (disambiguation)
