= Georgia Newspaper Hall of Fame =

The Georgia Newspaper Hall of Fame recognizes newspaper editors and publishers of the U.S. state of Georgia for their significant achievements or contributions. A permanent exhibit of the honorees is maintained at the Henry W. Grady College of Journalism and Mass Communication in Athens, Georgia. The Hall of Fame was founded in 1931 and the first inductee was the school's namesake Henry W. Grady, honored with a bust created by artist Steffen Thomas. Additional honorees have been added periodically at the annual convention of the Georgia Press Association, which solicits nominations for the honor. Nominees must "have rendered outstanding services in the field of newspaper journalism" and can only be nominated at least three years after they have died.

== Inductees ==
Georgia Newspaper Hall of Fame
Name	Image	Birth–Death	Year	Newspaper affiliation	Ref(s)
Carl Rountree		(1904–1985)	2025	Dawson News	
Samuel Marvin Griffin Jr.		(1936–2015)	2021	Bainbridge Post-Searchlight	
Joseph Stewart Parker Sr.		(1944–2016)	2021	Dallas New Era	
May Melton		(1923–2014)	2019	Griffin Daily News	
Quimby Melton Jr.		(1923–2013)	2019	Griffin Daily News	
Celestine Sibley		(1914–1999)	2019	Atlanta Constitution	
Otis A. Brumby Jr.		(1940–2012)	2017	Marietta Daily Journal	
J.B. Chism Jr.		(1914–1982)	2015	Pelham Journal	
Conrad Fink		(1932–2012)	2015	Henry W. Grady College of Journalism professor	
Jack Williams Jr.		(1913–1992)	2015	Waycross Journal-Herald	
Robert D. Fowler		(1930–1993)	2011	Gwinnett Daily News	
David Stanley Parkman		(1915–2007)	2011	Carroll County Georgian	
William C. Rogers Sr.		(1927–2002)	2011	Swainsboro Forest-Blade	
Charles A. Smithgall Jr.		(1910–2002)	2011	Gainesville Daily Times	
James Jefferson Thomasson Sr.		(1910–1979)	2011	Newnan Times-Herald	
James W. "Billy" Watson		(1938–1995)	2011	Columbus Ledger-Enquirer	
Charles M. Williamson Jr.		(1926–2008)	2011	Darien News	
Julia Collier Harris		(1885–1967)	1996	Columbus Enquirer Sun	
Julian LaRose Harris		(1874–1963)	1996	Columbus Enquirer Sun	
William Alexander Scott II		(1902–1934)	1996	Atlanta Daily World	
Zula Brown Toole		(1868–1947)	1996	Miller County Liberal	
Quimby Melton Sr.		(1890–1977)	1994	Griffin Daily News	
Madge Hilburn Methvin		(1900–1982)	1994	Vienna News	
William A. Ott		(1927–1989)	1994	Macon Telegraph & San Jose Mercury News	
Sanders Camp		(1912–1980)	1992	Walton Tribune	
James H. Gray Sr.		(1916–1986)	1992	Albany Herald	
Sarah Porter Hillhouse		(1763–1831)	1992	Washington Monitor	
Roscoe Ernest Ledford		(1899–1976)	1990	Vidalia Advance	
Jere Neuville Moore Sr.		(1902–1985)	1990	Milledgeville Union-Recorder	
William Kirkland Sutlive		(1901–1985)	1990	Blackshear Times	
Charles Leroy Black		(1923?–1982)	1988	Columbus Enquirer	
J. Roy McGinty		(1887–1979)	1988	Calhoun Times	
W.H. McWhorter		(1894–1979)	1988	DeKalb New Era	
Ron Autry		(1921–1982)	1986	Atlanta bureau of Associated Press	
John E. Drewry		(1902–1983)	1986	Henry W. Grady College of Journalism dean	
Marvin Griffin		(1907–1982)	1986	Bainbridge Post-Searchlight	
Joe Parham		(1919–1980)	1986	Macon News	
Leo Aikman		(1908–1978)	1984	Atlanta Constitution	
Edna Cain Daniel		(1875–1957)	1984	Quitman Free Press	
Susan Dowdell Myrick		(1893–1978)	1984	Macon Telegraph	
Albert S. Hardy Jr.		(1902–1977)	1982	Commerce News	
Louis C. Harris		(1912–1978)	1982	Augusta Chronicle-Herald	
Carlton M. Johnson		(1925–1977)	1982	Columbus Ledger	
William Tappan Thompson		(1812–1882)	1980	Savannah Morning News	
James B. Chism Sr.		(1892–1955)	1978	Pelham Journal	
Paul Talford Harber		(1884–1973)	1978	Commerce Observer	
Margaret Mitchell		(1900–1949)	1978	Atlanta Journal	
Charles Durden Rountree		(1880–1956)	1976	Wrightsville Headlight	
James Jefferson Thomasson		(1851–1946)	1976	Carroll County Times	
Emily Barnelia Woodward		(1885–1970)	1976	Vienna News	
William S. Morris Jr.		(1903–1967)	1974	Augusta Chronicle-Herald	
Nora Lawrence Smith		(1885–1971)	1974	Ashburn Wiregrass Farmer	
William R. Smith		(1883–1961)	1974	Cochran Journal	
William Ryan Frier		(1906–1969)	1972	Bartow Herald	
Ernest Rogers		(1897–1967)	1972	Atlanta Journal	
E.L. Turner		(1863–1967)	1972	Valdosta Daily Times	
John Hicks Hodges		(1851–1926)	1970	Houston Home Journal	
Ralph McGill		(1898–1969)	1970	Atlanta Constitution	
William Thomas Bacon		(1869–1944)	1968	Madisonian	
Milton L. Fleetwood		(1892–1966)	1968	Cartersville Tribune-News	
Thomas W. Loyless		(1870–1926)	1968	Augusta Chronicle	
William Alsa Shackleford		(1861–1945)	1968	Oglethorpe Echo (Lexington, Georgia)	
Charles Edward Benns		(1874–1964)	1966	Butler Herald	
Stiles A. Martin		(1882–1962)	1966	Atlanta Constitution	
Pleasant T. McCutchen		(1866–1947)	1966	Franklin News and Banner	
Theron S. Shope		(1874–1936)	1966	Dalton Citizen	
David Benjamin Turner		(1872–1955)	1966	Bulloch Times	
Otis A. Brumby Sr.		(1889–1953)	1964	Marietta Daily Journal & Cobb County Times	
John Lewis Herring		(1866–1923)	1964	Tifton Gazette	
Henry Martyn McIntosh		(1852–1925)	1964	Albany Herald	
Jere N. Moore		(1835–1902)	1964	Milledgeville Union-Recorder	
Ernest Camp Sr.		(1880–1957)	1962	Walton Tribune	
Herschel V. Jenkins		(1871–1960)	1962	Savannah News-Press	
Wightman F. Melton		(1867–1944)	1962	Griffin Daily News	
Jack Williams Sr.		(1879–1957)	1962	Waycross Journal-Herald	
Elias Boudinot		(1802–1839)	1959	Cherokee Phoenix	
James Johnston		(1738–1808)	1959	Georgia Gazette	
Mirabeau B. Lamar		(1798–1859)	1959	Columbus Enquirer	
Albert S. Hardy		(1873–1953)	1956	Gainesville News	
Joel Chandler Harris		(1848–1908)	1956	Atlanta Constitution	
Louie L. Morris		(1893–1955)	1956	Hartwell Sun	
John Paschall		(1879–1953)	1956	Atlanta Journal	
Frank L. Stanton		(1857–1927)	1956	Atlanta Constitution	
James B. Nevin		(1873–1931)	1951	Atlanta Georgian	
Joe Lawrence		(1858–1939)	1947	Ashburn Wiregrass Farmer	
Royal Daniel		(1870–1939)	1944	Quitman Free Press	
Dudley Glass		(1877–1943)	1944	Atlanta Georgian & Atlanta Constitution	
Hal M. Stanley		(1866–1944)	1944	Secretary-Treasurer of GPA and editor of Editors’ Forum	
Thomas J. Hamilton Sr.		(1885–1937)	1943	Augusta Chronicle	
James Cranston Williams		(1869–1936)	1943	Greensboro Herald-Journal	
John S. Cohen		(1870–1935)	1942	Atlanta Journal	
James R. Gray		(1859–1917)	1942	Atlanta Journal	
William G. Sutlive		(1873–1940)	1942	Savannah Evening Press	
Charles R. Pendleton		(1850–1914)	1932-1955	Macon Telegraph	
Patrick Walsh		(1840–1899)	1932-1955	Augusta Chronicle	
Clark Howell		(1863–1936)	1932-1941	Atlanta Constitution	
Bowdre Phinizy		(1871–1931)	1932-1941	Augusta Herald	
Pleasant A. Stovall		(1857–1935)	1932-1941	Savannah Evening Press	
Henry W. Grady		(1850–1889)	1931	Atlanta Constitution	
