= Marlor =

Marlor is a surname. Notable people with the surname include:

- John Marlor (1789–1835), American architect
- Rothwell Marlor (1893–1954), English rugby league player

== See also ==
- Marler
- Marlo
