= Zula Brown Toole =

American journalist (1868–1947)

- Born: Zula Orlena Brown; November 13, 1868; Decatur County, Georgia, US
- Died: October 27, 1947 (aged 78); Colquitt, Georgia, US
- Other name: Zula Brown Cook
- Occupation: Newspaper publisher
- Years active: 1897–1939
- Known for: First woman to found a newspaper in Georgia
- Spouses: W.B. Cook (m. 1891; died 1896); Joseph E. Toole (m. 1901; died 1917)
- Children: 3

Zula Brown Toole (November 13, 1868 – October 27, 1947) was an American newspaper publisher who founded the Miller County Liberal in 1897, making her the first woman to establish and publish a newspaper in the U.S. state of Georgia. In 1996 she was inducted into the Georgia Newspaper Hall of Fame.

== Early life ==
Zula Orlena Brown was born November 13, 1868 the daughter of Samuel Morgan and Eldorendo Virginia Brown (nee Higgs) of Decatur County, Georgia. Her father was a veteran of the Confederate Army, who was a merchant and farmer.

Brown attended the Bainbridge schools in Decatur County and Andrew Female College in Cuthbert. She obtained a teaching certificate from Troy State Teachers College in Alabama.

She married W.B. "Tony" Cook on June 27, 1891 but was widowed in 1896 with a one-year-old son. At first, she earned a living by teaching and was also the local postmaster from 1893 to 1898.

== Career ==
She thought the area needed a newspaper, so she collected 500 signatures of people who promised to subscribe if she started one, which was required for a state franchise. She saved $200 from her teaching job and used it to buy a hand press and metal type. On September 11, 1897, she published the first edition of her newspaper, the Miller County Liberal. In the early days of the paper, Toole rode a bicycle to gather news, working on the paper before and after her daytime teaching job.

Three years after starting the newspaper, she married Joseph E. Toole (a local farmer) on April 21, 1901. It was at that point she gave up her teaching job. Mr. Toole died in 1917. Toole had a total of three children.

In 1932, Toole established a second paper, the Decatur County Advance in Bainbridge. She operated it until 1939, when poor health forced her to retire. Her daughter took over that newspaper.

== Death and legacy ==
Just after the 50th anniversary of founding the Miller County Liberal Toole died in October 1947 in Colquitt. She was buried in the Colquitt City Cemetery.

The Miller County Liberal continues to be published by descendants of Toole. In 1996 Toole was inducted into the Georgia Newspaper Hall of Fame. At the 1996 Summer Olympics a play called Swamp Gravy was performed that depicted elements of her life.

== See also ==
- Sarah Porter Hillhouse was the publisher of a newspaper in Georgia in 1803
- Marie Louise Scudder Myrick another woman editor/publisher in Georgia (Americus Times after 1895)
