= Marler =

Marler is an English surname. Notable people with the surname include:

- George Carlyle Marler (1901–1981), Canadian politician
- Herbert Meredith Marler (1876–1940), Canadian politician and diplomat
- Joe Marler (born 1990), English Rugby union player
- Seth Marler (born 1981), American football placekicker
- Taryn Marler (born 1988), Australian actress

People with surnames that are cognates of Marler include:

- Robin Marlar (1931–2022), English cricketer and cricket journalist
- John Marlor (1789–1835), English-American architect

Fictional characters:

- Blake Marler, character on the television program Guiding Light
- Dinah Marler, character on the television program Guiding Light

== See also ==
- William F. Marlar Memorial Foundation
- Marlers
