= William H. Crews =

American politician

William H. Crews (1845–?) was a justice of the peace and state legislator in North Carolina. A Republican, he served in North Carolina House of Representatives from 1874–1877 and in 1893. His son William H. Crews Jr. served in the same seat in 1895 and 1897.

He was a Republican. He signed a letter of protest over the expulsion from the House of J. Williams Thorne.

He introduced a resolution respecting Frederick Douglass after his death. It passed and controversy followed as Democrats claimed George Washington and Robert E. Lee had been slighted.
