= Edna Cain Daniel =

American journalist

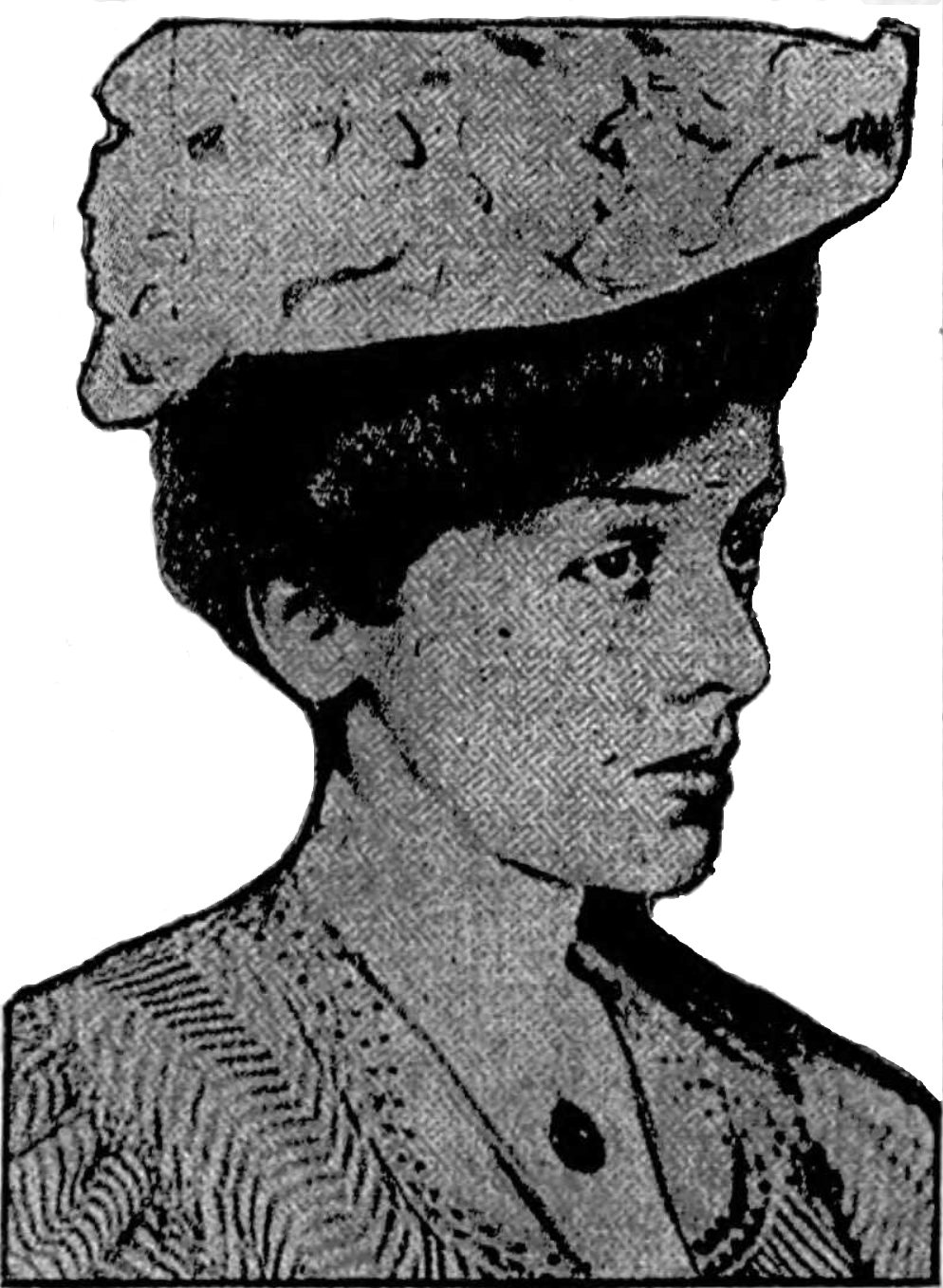
- Edna Cain in 1907
- Born: Edna L. Cain; October 23, 1875; Chattooga County, Georgia
- Died: February 21, 1957 (aged 81); Quitman, Georgia
- Occupation: Newspaper publisher
- Years active: 1895-1956
- Known for: Over 50 years of journalism in Georgia
- Spouse: Royal Daniel (m. 1915; died 1939)

Edna Cain Daniel (October 23, 1875 – February 21, 1957) was a writer, columnist, newspaper editor, and publisher in the US state of Georgia for over 50 years. She was the first woman reporter to work for The Atlanta Constitution. For many years she edited the weekly Free Press in Quitman, Georgia. She has been called the "grand lady of journalism in Georgia" and "one of the South's best all-around newswomen." In 1984 she was inducted into the Georgia Newspaper Hall of Fame.

== Early life ==
Edna L. Cain was born in 1875 in Summerville, Georgia, to John Wilson Cain and Amanda B. Cain (née Johnson). She had a brother John Jr. and a sister Catherine. Her father was a newspaper publisher and had also represented Chattooga County in the Georgia State Legislature.

== Career ==
Cain assisted her father at the Summerville newspaper. Although she later joked she had convinced him to put her name on the masthead as an editor so she could get a free railroad pass, she was assistant editor and "right hand man" to her father. She showed her ability as a writer with poems, clever stories and other items. She was regarded as "one of the brightest writers" for the newspaper.

In 1896 she lobbied for a bill to allow women to serve as state librarian, and she served for a time as the assistant state librarian. While in Atlanta she later became the first woman reporter for The Atlanta Constitution. In 1897 she became editor of the society news for the Constitution.

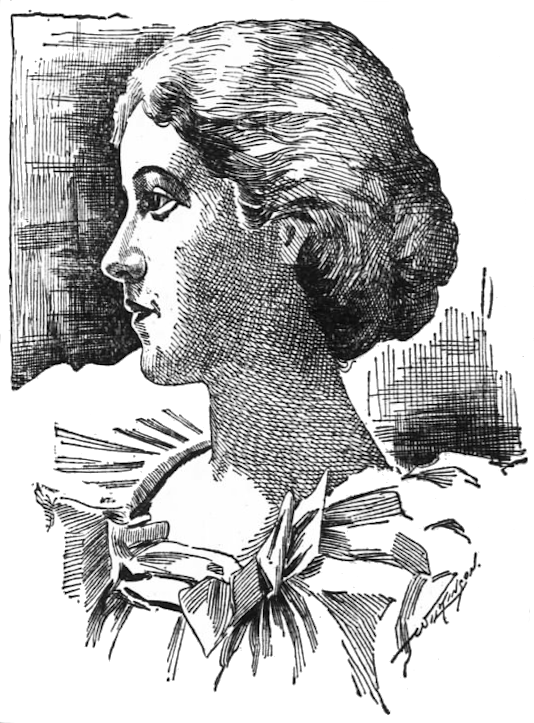
Edna Cain in 1896

In 1899 Edna moved with her father to Quitman, Georgia. He had bought the Quitman Free Press, (a weekly newspaper) after the death of its former editor. Edna and her brother John assisted their father with the paper.

Against the wishes of her father, in 1907 she traveled to New York and became a member of the feature staff of the New York World. There she worked for the editor Charles Chapin, and "held her own" with the other staff such as Irvin S. Cobb. She wrote feature stories from Puerto Rico and elsewhere for New York newspapers. After a year in New York she moved back to Georgia.

In 1913, Royal Daniel (a former managing editor of the Atlanta Journal) became editor and publisher of the Quitman Free Press as John Cain Sr. stepped back to be managing director. Edna Cain was associate editor of the paper. She married Daniel in September 1915. She stepped up to full editor during World War I as her husband became busy with other duties including directing the southern division of the American Red Cross.

An incident during the war was illustrative of Daniel's resolve as editor. A scandal arose over a local clergyman getting more than his "Hooverized" share of flour. The local administrator cracked down on the clergyman, and a banker in the town "ordered Miss Edna" to denounce the administrator in an editorial. Her reaction was to laugh him out of her office, but he retaliated with a loan foreclosure against the paper. The town sided with Daniel, to the point that a replacement loan from a different bank had so many endorsers that there was no room for her own signature on the note.

Her father died in 1921. She and her husband Royal Daniel were co-editors of the paper together for some 25 years. She became the sole editor and publisher of the newspaper when her husband died in 1939.

Daniel called herself a "liberal Democrat". She always opposed conservative Georgia governor Eugene Talmadge in editorials. When a businessman threatened to pull his advertising from the paper unless she relented, Daniel told him, "All right, you can cancel, but I'll give you one free ad. I'll write it and tell why you canceled. That's blackmail, I suppose, but I learned about it from you." The businessman relented. Daniel continued to oppose Talmadge in his final run for office, in what became a controversial election in 1946.

Even while she was editor and publisher of the Quitman Free Press she continued to write for other outlets including The American City, The Georgia Review, The Delineator, and others. She also wrote a ("wonderful" according to Celestine Sibley) column for the Atlanta Journal until two years before her death.

For many years she was involved in the Georgia Press Association including serving as vice president and attending the Georgia Press Institute. She was active in civic life in Quitman. She was a charter member of the Quitman Garden Club, the first chairman of the Quitman Parks Commission and the first woman to serve on the Brooks County Board of Health.

== Death and legacy ==
In 1956 Daniel was given the Brenda Award for her "fearless journalism" from the Atlanta chapter of Theta Sigma Phi. The award is presented annually for "outstanding public service in the field of journalism". It was the first time that award had been presented to a woman.

She died the next year in Brooks County Hospital after having a heart attack, and was buried in Oak Hill Cemetery in Quitman.

In 1984 Daniel was posthumously inducted into the Georgia Newspaper Hall of Fame, which had also inducted her husband Royal Daniel in 1944.
