= George P. Doles =

Confederate Army officer in the American Civil War

George Pierce Doles
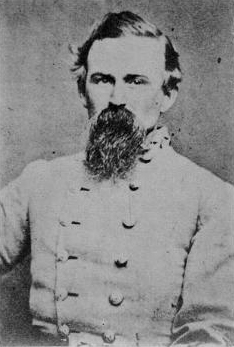
- George P. Doles
- Born: May 14, 1830; Milledgeville, Georgia, U.S.
- Died: June 2, 1864 (aged 34) near Bethesda Church, Virginia, U.S.
- Burial place: Memory Hill Cemetery; Milledgeville, Georgia
- Military career
- Allegiance: Confederate States
- Branch: Confederate States Army
- Service years: 1861–1864
- Rank: Captain (Militia); Brigadier General (CSA)
- Commands: Doles' Brigade; 4th Georgia Infantry Regiment
- Conflicts: American Civil War

George Pierce Doles (May 14, 1830 – June 2, 1864) was an American businessman and Confederate general during the American Civil War. His men played a key role on the first day of the Battle of Gettysburg in driving back the Union XI Corps.

== Early life ==
Doles was born in Milledgeville, Georgia, the son of Josiah and Martha (Pierce) Doles. His father was a tailor by occupation. Doles was educated in the town's common schools. At the age of 16, Doles loaded a stagecoach with his brother, bound to join the Army in the Mexican–American War, but he was intercepted by his father before the coach could depart. He became a successful businessman in Milledgeville and was elected captain of the "Baldwin Blues," a local militia company.

== Civil War ==
With the secession of Georgia and the start of the Civil War in 1861, Doles enlisted in the Confederate Army along with most of his militia unit and they were incorporated as Company H in the 4th Georgia Volunteer Infantry Regiment. They were mustered into service on April 26, 1861, in Milledgeville and left for Augusta the next day. On May 9, 1861, he was appointed colonel of the regiment and led it during the Peninsula Campaign as a part of the Army of Northern Virginia. He was wounded at the Battle of Malvern Hill.

During the 1862 Maryland Campaign, his regiment was a part of Ripley's Brigade in D. H. Hill's Division. It helped in the defense of South Mountain before withdrawing towards Sharpsburg, Maryland. When General Roswell Ripley fell with a wound at the Battle of Antietam defending Mumma's Farm, Doles assumed temporary command of the brigade and led it in an assault into the southern end of the Miller cornfield. Doles's command of the brigade was made official on November 1, 1862, with his promotion to brigadier general. He led the brigade with efficiency during the battles of Fredericksburg and Chancellorsville.

On January 19, 1863, before the Battle of Chancellorsville in May, several brigades of the Army of Northern Virginia were rearranged to contain regiments from the same states. On this date, the 1st and 3rd North Carolina Infantry Regiments were transferred out of Doles's Brigade and the 12th and 21st Georgia Infantry Regiments were transferred into Doles' Brigade. Thus, from that date, Doles's Brigade consisted of the 4th Georgia Infantry, 12th Georgia Infantry, 21st Georgia Infantry and the 44th Georgia Infantry Regiments.

During the 1863 Gettysburg campaign, Doles's Brigade, 1,300 strong, formed part of Robert E. Rodes's Division. On July 1, 1863, Doles attacked the line of the Union XI Corps in fields near Rock Creek north of Gettysburg, driving their adversaries back over a mile. Pressure from Doles, as well as from fellow Georgian John B. Gordon and other brigades, eventually forced much of the XI Corps to collapse and retire to Cemetery Hill. The brigade suffered 219 casualties at Gettysburg—46 killed, 106 wounded, and 67 captured—a loss of 16.6% of its strength. Doles's men did not see any significant action on the second or third day of the battle, nor in the subsequent Bristoe or Mine Run Campaigns.

In 1864, Doles led his brigade during the Overland Campaign, fighting in the Wilderness and at Spotsylvania Court House, where the brigade was attacked by an overwhelming force and overrun at the "Mule Shoe" salient on May 10, suffering about 650 casualties, of which about 350 were captured. Doles himself escaped capture by falling down to the ground and playing dead until a counterattack materialized. With the assistance of other brigades, the lost entrenchments were eventually recaptured. During the Battle of Cold Harbor in June, a Union sharpshooter shot Doles in the left breast as he was inspecting the Confederate entrenchments near Bethesda Church, Virginia. He died instantly. Command of the brigade passed to Colonel (later Brigadier General) Philip Cook of the 4th Georgia Infantry.

Doles was buried in Memory Hill Cemetery in Milledgeville, Georgia.

== See also ==
- List of American Civil War generals (Confederate)
