= Memory Hill Cemetery =

Cemetery in Baldwin County, Georgia, US

Coordinates: 33.07504°N 83.22889°W

- Interactive map of Memory Hill Cemetery

Details
- Established: 1804
- Location: Milledgeville, Georgia

Memory Hill Cemetery is an American cemetery in Milledgeville, Georgia. The cemetery opened in 1804. Originally designated as one of the four public squares of twenty acres each in the Milledgeville town plan of 1803, it later came to be known as Cemetery Square. Many people associated with Milledgeville and Georgia history, such as L.Q.C. Lamar, Congressman Carl Vinson, and Flannery O'Connor, as well as early Georgia governors, legislators, college presidents, enslaved people, and soldiers, are buried here.

== Notable interments ==
- Thomas Petters Carnes (1762–1822), United States Representative for Georgia and state court judge.
- George Pierce Doles (1830–1864), Georgia businessman and Confederate general during the American Civil War.
- Tomlinson Fort (1787–1859), United States Representative for Georgia
- Tomlinson Fort (1839–1910), mayor of Chattanooga, Tennessee
- Seaton Grantland (1782–1864), United States Representative for Georgia
- Dixie Haygood (1861–1915), illusionist and vaudeville star
- Charles Holmes Herty (1867–1938), American academic, scientist, and businessman
- Edwin Francis Jemison (1844–1862), Confederate Civil War soldier whose haunting photograph is one of the most reproduced images from this conflict
- Augustus Holmes Kenan (1805–1870), member of the Georgia House of Representatives, Georgia Senate, Provisional Confederate Congress, and First Confederate Congress
- John Marlor, master builder and originator of the "Milledgeville Federal" style in Milledgeville, Georgia
- Ezra Allen "Bill" Miner (1847–1913), noted American criminal
- David Brydie Mitchell (1766–1837), Governor of Georgia
- Susan Myrick (1893–1978), American author and newspaper columnist, known as "The Emily Post of the South"
- Flannery O'Connor (1925–1964), American author
- James Milton Richardson (1913–1980), fifth bishop of the Episcopal Diocese of Texas
- John W. A. Sanford (1798–1870), United States Representative for Georgia
- Carl Vinson (1883–1981), United States Representative for Georgia
- John W. Wilcox, Jr. (1882–1942), United States Navy rear admiral (memorial marker only; Wilcox was lost at sea and his body was not recovered)
