= Nora Lawrence Smith =

American journalist and newspaper publisher

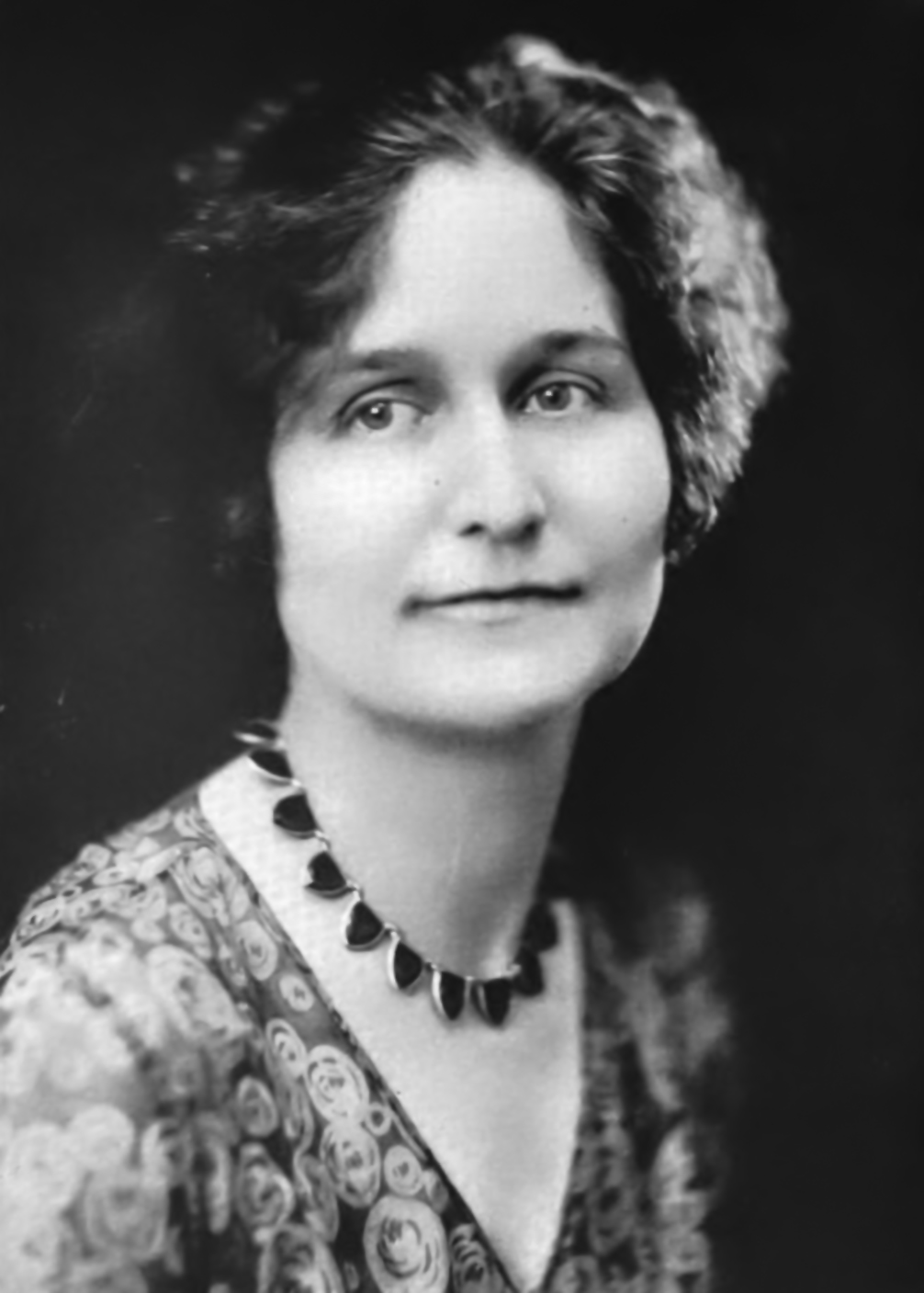
- Smith in 1931
- Born: Nora Lawrence; December 25, 1885; Dempsey, Dodge County, Georgia
- Died: July 17, 1971 (aged 85); Ashburn, Georgia
- Other name: "Miss Nora"
- Occupation: Newspaper publisher
- Years active: 1905 - 1969
- Employer: Wiregrass Farmer
- Known for: Newspaper publishing in Georgia for over 50 years
- Political party: Democratic

Nora Lawrence Smith (December 25, 1885 - July 17, 1971) was an American newspaper publisher and activist in Ashburn, Georgia. She has been called a "pioneer among women publishers" and "one of the best known and most respected weekly editors in the state." In 1974 she became the first woman inducted into the Georgia Newspaper Hall of Fame.

== Early life ==
Nora Lawrence was born on Christmas Day 1885 to Joe Lawrence and Margaret (Hall) Lawrence in Dempsey in Dodge County, Georgia. Her father was an Irish immigrant who moved from New York to Georgia, and founded the Wiregrass Farmer newspaper in 1899. Nora learned to set type by hand at age 13 in her father's shop. She was educated in the public schools in Ashburn, and graduated from Houghton College in New York.

== Career ==
After a brief marriage ended in divorce, Smith returned to Ashburn to work at the newspaper in 1905. She worked there alongside her father for many years. After Joe Lawrence died in 1939, she became the editor-publisher of the Wiregrass Farmer with a business partner.

Smith was dedicated to the farmers who read her paper. The boll weevil had devastated cotton farmers in the early 20th century, including many in Turner County (which surrounds Ashburn). A coalition created an alternative for farmers that became known as the "Turner county plan" or the "Cow, Hog and Hen program". The plan featured elements of crop diversification and livestock farming. Smith and her father were determined advocates of the plan through their newspaper. Over a third of the farmers in Turner County adopted the plan its first year in 1920, and it was a huge success. The Georgia Press Association gave her the William G. Sutlive trophy in 1924 for her work on this issue. At the presentation she was praised for working "so energetically and ably for the success of diversified agriculture".

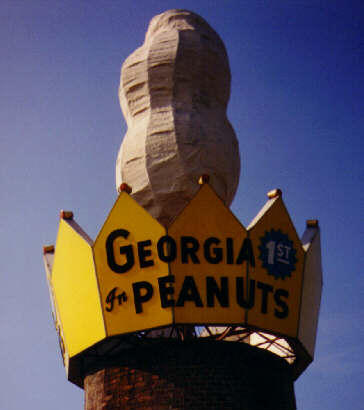
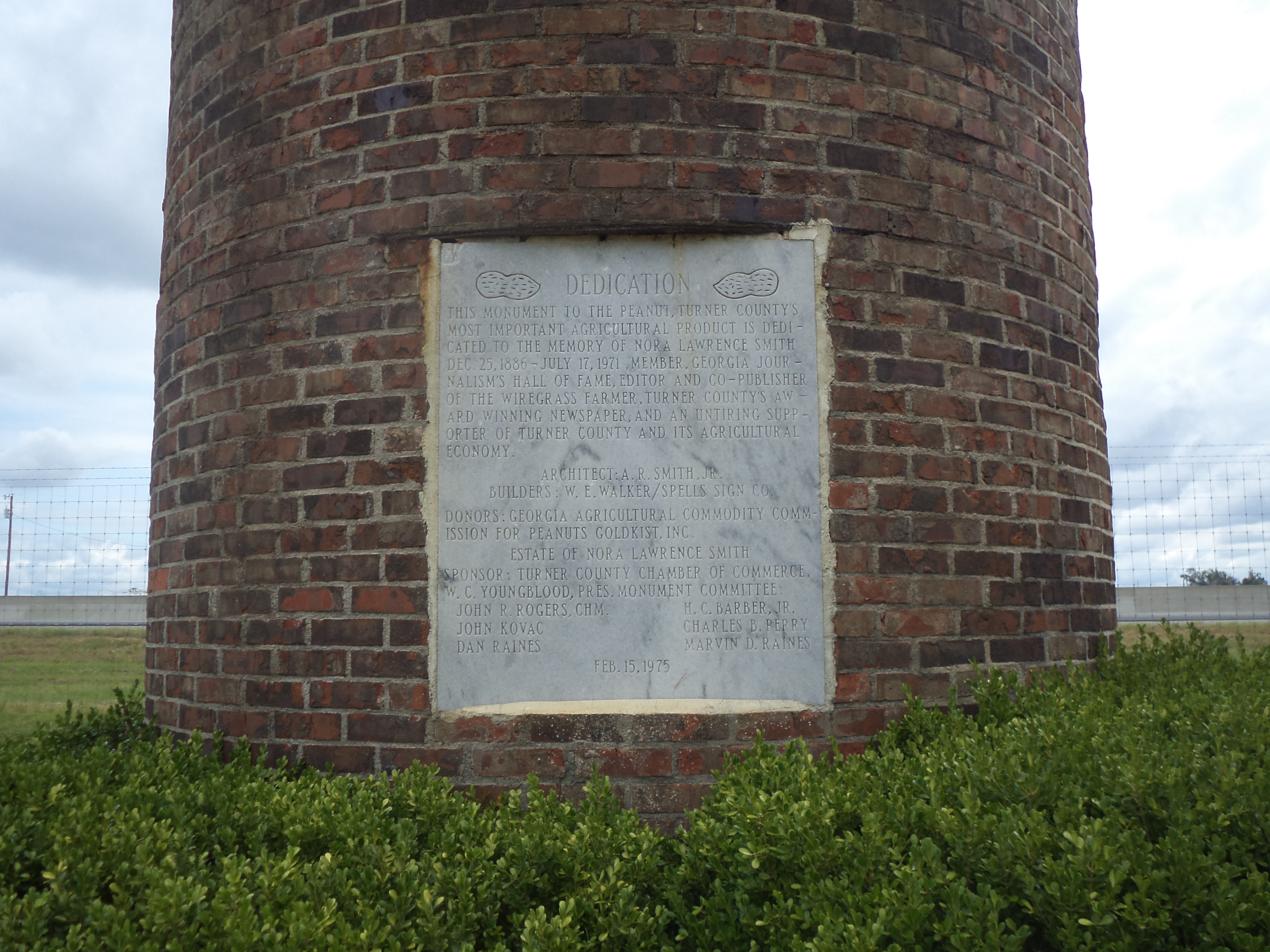
The giant peanut adjacent to I-75 in Ashburn was dedicated to Smith via a plaque

Smith was also an advocate for road improvements and highway beautification for 50 years. She lobbied for the paving of U.S. 41 (which passes through Ashburn) and in 1929 she participated in the dedication of the highway by Senator Walter F. George. She was given another award by the Georgia Press Association that same year for this effort. When Interstate 75 was being built in Georgia, Smith lobbied for the section through Ashburn to be among the first completed. When that segment was dedicated in 1959 by Governor Ernest Vandiver, Smith served as the master of ceremonies. She said, "I love good roads and I'm glad to fight for them. Good roads are helpful things...they make the nation just a neighborhood."

Smith was an "eloquent, if arrogant" editorialist and she "never tired of her civic duty and responsibility." She supported women's rights.

Smith was an active clubwoman. She was quite involved in Democratic politics and was an early supporter of FDR for president. She was a "vocal, influential delegate" to the Democratic National Convention in the years 1924, 1928, 1932, and 1936. The 1924 convention was first to receive women delegates from Georgia.

== Personal life ==
Smith kept a very regular schedule, rising each day at 6:30am to make phone calls, lunch at noon with friends, leaving the office at 5:20pm to make more phone calls and retiring each day at 9:50pm. Smith suffered from arthritis and made annual visits to Hot Springs, Arkansas in search of relief. She was also a regular guest at Atlanta's Henry Grady Hotel during Christmas.

== Honors and awards ==
Smith received many awards during her lifetime. Several civic organizations of Ashburn and Turner County declared "Nora Lawrence Smith Day" in April 1952.

The National Newspaper Association gave her the Emma C. McKinney Memorial Award in 1968 for "outstanding contributions to her community and her profession." She was third recipient of the award and the first woman from Georgia to win it. Governor Lester Maddox declared June 6, 1968 to be "Nora Lawrence Smith Day" statewide in recognition of her winning the McKinney award.

She was a member of the Georgia Press Association's "Golden Club", signifying people who have worked at newspapers for more than 50 years. She never missed a GPA convention in over 30 years. When the GPA obtained a new office building in 1969, Smith donated $10,000 to the building fund and the group named the "Nora Lawrence Smith Conference Room" in her honor.

== Death and legacy ==
Smith sold the newspaper in 1969 and retired. She died at age 85 in July 1971 following a stroke.

In 1974 Smith was inducted into the Georgia Newspaper Hall of Fame, which had also inducted her father Joe Lawrence in 1947.

In 1975 a 20 foot tall peanut sculpture on a pedestal was erected in Ashburn, and dedicated to Smith for her promotion of agriculture in the town. It was adjacent to the same segment of Interstate 75 that Smith helped open in 1959.
