= Myrick =

Myrick may refer to:

== People ==
- Myrick (surname)
- Myrick Davies ( ? - 1781), American politician

== Places ==
- Myrick, Oregon, an unincorporated historic community in Umatilla County, Oregon, in the United States

== See also ==
- Myricks (disambiguation)
