= Andrew College =

Private college in Cuthbert, Georgia, US

- Former name: Andrew Female College
- Motto: Lux et Scientia (Latin: "Light & Knowledge")
- Type: Private college
- Established: 1854; 172 years ago
- Religious affiliation: United Methodist Church
- Endowment: $12,000,000
- President: Dr. William R. Kennedy
- Administrative staff: 32 (est.)
- Students: 602 (2025)
- Location: Cuthbert, Georgia, United States; 31.772°N 84.796°W
- Campus: Small town, 50 acres (0.16 km²)
- Colors: Blue and Gold
- Nickname: Fighting Tigers
- Sporting affiliations: NAIA – SSAC
- Website: andrewcollege.edu

Andrew College is a private liberal arts college in Cuthbert, Georgia. It is associated with The United Methodist Church and is the ninth-oldest college in Georgia. Andrew is accredited by the Southern Association of Colleges and Schools Commission on Colleges (SACSCOC).

== History ==
Andrew College was granted its charter as Andrew Female College by the Georgia General Assembly on January 15, 1854. At the time, it was the second oldest charter in the United States to give an educational institution the right to confer degrees upon women. It was named for Bishop James Osgood Andrew of the Methodist Episcopal Church, South.

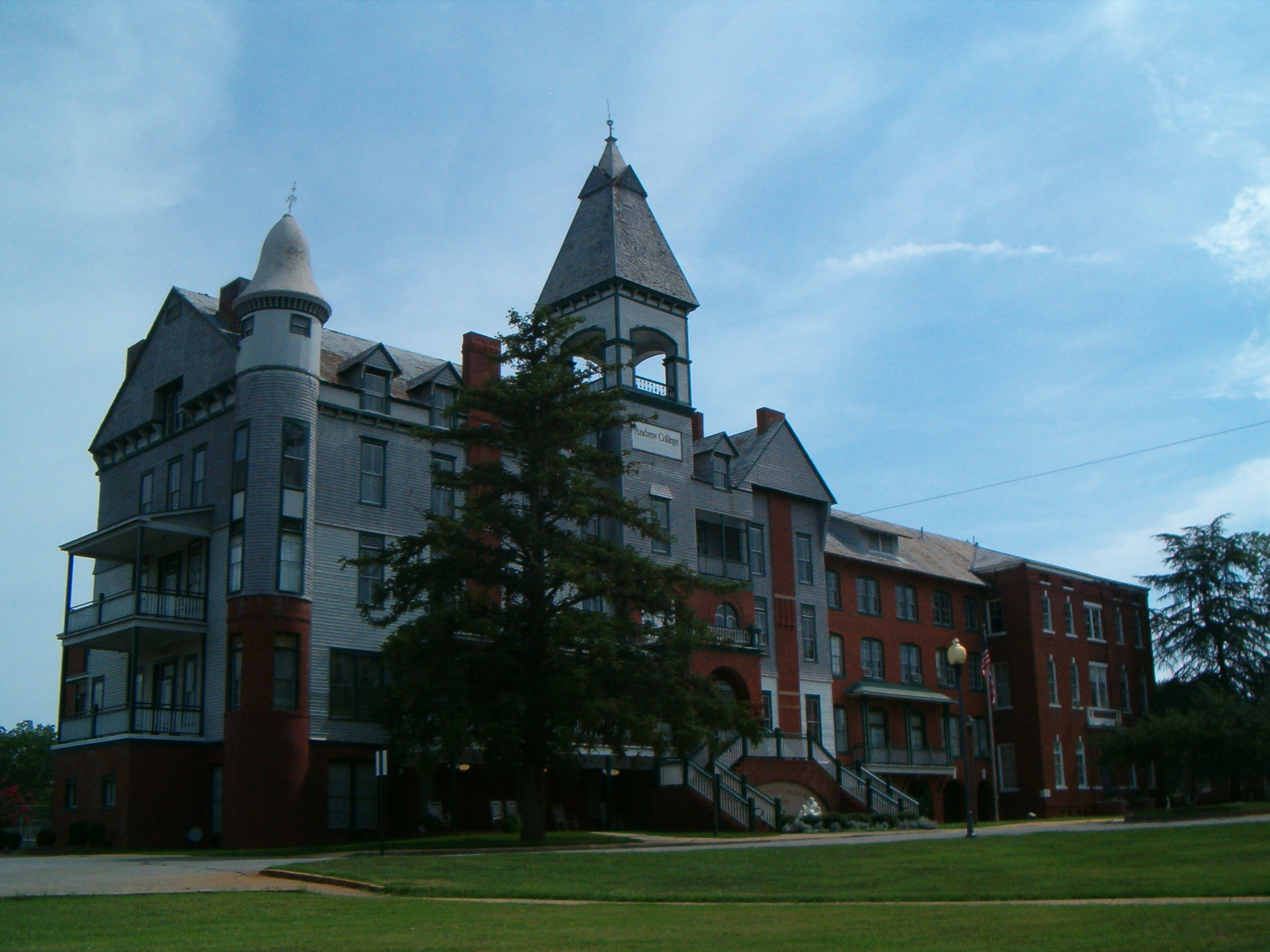
Old Main building

In 1864, Andrew College was requisitioned by the Confederate Army and served as Hood Hospital during the American Civil War. It was one of three hospitals in Cuthbert. Despite its buildings being used as a hospital, classes continued on a limited basis, and female students assisted the wounded with tasks like reading and writing letters.

In 1892, a fire consumed the campus. The people of Cuthbert raised money to begin rebuilding the same year. That fall, the college reopened in what is now known as Old Main, a five-story Victorian, designed by Atlanta architect William H. Parkins, that was constructed for $25,000. Parkins was the most significant architect practicing in Georgia in the immediate decades following the Civil War. He settled in Atlanta where he started the state's most successful architectural business, which lasted until his retirement in the late 1880s.

In 1917, Andrew became a junior college. The institution became co-educational in 1956. In 2018, Andrew began offering a baccalaureate degrees again.

The current president is William R. Kennedy who has served since June 2023.

== Accreditation ==
Andrew College is accredited by the Southern Association of Colleges and Schools Commission on Colleges (SACSCOC) to award associate degrees, baccalaureate degrees, and certificate programs designed to prepare students for meaningful careers and lifelong learning.

== Student body ==
Approximately 65% of students live on campus. The student profile is evenly divided between male and female students. There are students from thirty states and several countries.

An overwhelming majority of the college's student body originates from Georgia, Florida and Alabama, followed by scholars from other U.S. states and international students. Half of the students from Georgia matriculate from one of the 28 counties that constitute the Atlanta Metropolitan Statistical Area, and the remaining in-state students come to Andrew from larger South Georgia cities such as Columbus, Macon, and Albany.

== Athletics ==
Andrew College, nicknamed the Fighting Tigers, is a member of the National Association of Intercollegiate Athletics (NAIA) as of the 2026–2027 academic year. It is a part of the Southern States Athletic Conference (SSAC). Before 2026, it was a Division I member of the Georgia Collegiate Athletic Association (GCAA) and Region XVII of the National Junior College Athletic Association (NJCAA).

Men's sports include baseball, basketball, football, golf, soccer, and wrestling. Women's sports include basketball, dance, flag football, soccer, softball, volleyball and women's wrestling. The Fighting Tigers also include a COED Cheerleading team.

The Andrew College baseball team reached the NJCAA College World Series in Colorado for the first time in program history in the 2023 season after the team won conference and regional championships in the Fighting Tigers' 34-win 2023 season.

Football, cheerleading, and wrestling debuted at Andrew College in the fall of 2024. The football team finished its inaugural season with a 5–2 record and is scheduled to play a 10-game season in 2025. The cheerleading squad placed sixth at the National Tournament, while the wrestling team won its district championship and qualified 10 wrestlers for the National Tournament in March 2025.

== Financial ==
Total tuition and fees plus room and board for the 2025–2026 academic year is $32,224 per student. However, with an institutional financial aid budget exceeding $4 million, access to the Georgia Tuition Equalization Grant, federal grants and private support, Andrew's true cost is greatly reduced.

As of 2025, the college had an endowment of $12,000,000.

== Notable alumni ==
- Joe Nasco professional soccer player
- Zula Brown Toole first woman to found and publish a newspaper in Georgia
- Trai Byers, professional actor
