= Ralph McGill =

American journalist (1898–1969)

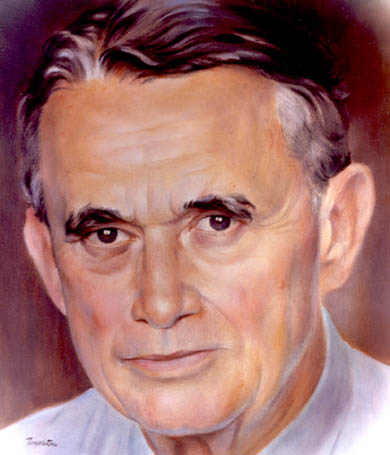
- Ralph McGill portrait by Robert Templeton, 1984

Peabody Award Board of Jurors
- In office 1945–1968

Personal details
- Born: February 5, 1898 near, Soddy-Daisy, Tennessee, U.S.
- Died: February 3, 1969 (aged 70)
- Resting place: Westview Cemetery

Military service
- Branch/service: United States Marine Corps
- Battles/wars: World War I

Ralph Emerson McGill (February 5, 1898 – February 3, 1969) was an American journalist and editorialist. An anti-segregationist editor, he published the Atlanta Constitution newspaper despite receiving threats and intimidation such as crosses burned on his lawn from white supremacist terror groups. Martin Luther King Jr. named him in his Letter from Birmingham Jail. He was also one of the first critics of Joseph McCarthy. He won a Pulitzer Prize for editorial writing in 1959 and was awarded the Presidential Medal of Freedom in 1964. Since his death, he was inducted in the Georgia Newspaper Hall of Fame and has had a school and a road named after him in Atlanta.

== Early life and education ==
McGill was born February 5, 1898, near Soddy-Daisy, Tennessee. He attended school at The McCallie School in Chattanooga, Tennessee and Vanderbilt University in Nashville, Tennessee where he played guard on the football team. He did not graduate from Vanderbilt because he was suspended his senior year for writing an article in the student newspaper critical of the school's administration. McGill served in the Marine Corps during World War I.

== Career in journalism ==
After the war, McGill got a job working for the sports department of the Nashville Banner and soon worked his way up to sports editor. In 1929, he moved to Atlanta, Georgia to become the assistant sports editor of The Atlanta Constitution. Wanting to move from sports to more serious news, he got an assignment to cover the first Cuban Revolt in 1933. He also applied for and was granted a Rosenwald Fellowship in 1938, which allowed him to cover the Nazi takeover of Austria in 1938. These articles earned him a spot as executive editor of the Constitution, where he used his daily front-page column to highlight the effects of segregation. In response, many angry readers sent threats and letters to McGill. Some acted on the threats and burned crosses at night on his front lawn, fired bullets into the windows of his home and left crude bombs in his mailbox. He also served as an adviser to Franklin D. Roosevelt, who vacationed in Warm Springs, Georgia, as well as presidents Truman and Eisenhower.

=== Syndicated columnist ===
In the late 1950s, McGill became a syndicated columnist, reaching a national audience as his columns were reprinted in over 100 papers. He was also promoted from editor to publisher. In 1960, McGill was the only editor of a major white southern paper to cover the passive resistance tactics used by the students involved in the Greensboro sit-ins, although eventually other papers followed his lead. He was also one of the first editors of a major paper to criticize Joseph McCarthy. He became friends with Presidents John F. Kennedy and Lyndon Johnson, acting as a civil rights advisor and behind the scenes envoy to several African nations.

He was also a member of the Board of Jurors for the Peabody Awards, serving from 1945 to 1968.

== Final years and legacy ==
In addition to winning the Pulitzer Prize for Editorial Writing in 1959, McGill received the Elijah Parish Lovejoy Award as well as an honorary Doctor of Laws degree from dozens of universities and colleges, including Harvard, an honorary Doctor of Humane Letters from Kenyon College in 1964, and the Presidential Medal of Freedom in 1964. In 1963 he published his book The South and the Southerner as well as several anthologies of his newspaper articles. McGill died of a heart attack two days before his 71st birthday. McGill's funeral was held at his parish, All Saints' Episcopal Church, and is buried in Atlanta's historic Westview Cemetery. A bomb threat was made at his funeral but no bomb was found.

After his death Ralph McGill Boulevard (previously Forrest Boulevard) and Ralph McGill Middle School were named for him in Atlanta. In his honor, The McGill Lecture is held annually at The Grady School of Journalism at the University of Georgia, featuring a nationally recognized journalist. In 1970 McGill was inducted into the Georgia Newspaper Hall of Fame.

His personal papers were donated to Emory University and are available at the Manuscripts and Rare Book Library (MARBL) at Emory University Library. Ralph McGill is mentioned by name by Martin Luther King Jr. in his Letter from Birmingham Jail as one of the "few enlightened white persons" to understand and sympathize with the civil rights movement at the time of the letter (April 1963). McGill's role in the campaign against segregation is depicted in Michael Braz's opera, A Scholar Under Siege, composed for the centenary of Georgia Southern University and premiered in 2007. A National Public Broadcasting prime time special, Dawn's Early Light: Ralph McGill and the Segregated South (1988), documented his impact. Burt Lancaster voiced McGill and prominent figures appear such as Julian Bond, Tom Brokaw, Jimmy Carter, John Lewis, Vernon Jordan, Herman Talmadge, Sander Vanocur, Andrew Young, and Pulitzer Prize winning journalists Harry Ashmore, Eugene Patterson and Claude Sitton.

== Works ==
- McGill, Ralph (1980). The Best of Ralph McGill: Selected Columns. Selected by Michael Strickland, Harry Davis, and Jeff Strickland. Atlanta: Cherokee Publishing. ISBN 0877970521.
- —————— (2009). The Fleas Come With the Dog. Whitefish, Montana: Kessinger Publishing. ISBN 9781104847272.
- —————— (1984). No Place to Hide: the South and Human Rights, vol. I. Edited with an introduction by Calvin M. Logue. Macon, Georgia: Mercer University Press. ISBN 9780865541085.
- —————— (1984). No Place to Hide: the South and Human Rights, vol. II. Edited with an introduction by Calvin M. Logue. Macon, Georgia: Mercer University Press. ISBN 9780865541092.
- —————— (1992). The South and the Southerner. Athens, Georgia: University of Georgia Press. ISBN 0820314439.
- —————— (1983). Southern Encounters: Southerners of Note in Ralph McGill's South. Macon, Georgia: Mercer University Press. ISBN 9780865540507.
