= Myricks =

Myricks may refer to:

== People ==
- Dary Myricks (b. 1976), American professional football player
- Larry Myricks (b. 1956), American athlete

== Places ==
- Myricks, Massachusetts, an association community or populated place in Bristol County, Massachusetts, in the United States
- Myricks Corner, California, an unincorporated community in Kern County, California, in the United States

== Other ==
- Myricks Airport in Berkley, Massachusetts, in the United States

== See also ==
- Myrick (disambiguation)
