= Marie Louise Scudder Myrick =

Editor of the Americus Times

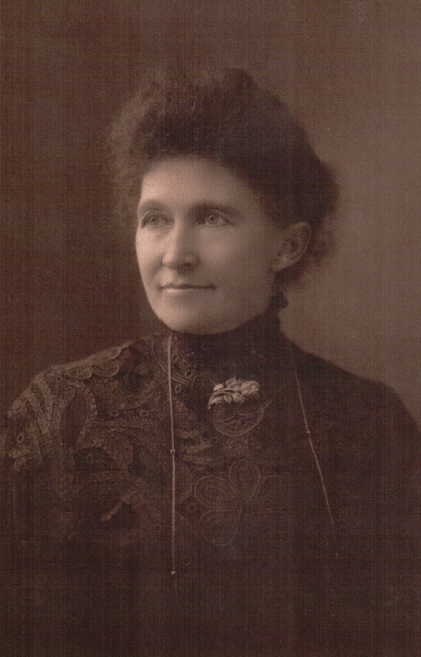
- Mrs. Myrick around the time of her retirement as editor of the Americus Times-Recorder
- Born: Marie Louise Scudder; December 5, 1853; Shelbyville
- Died: June 10, 1934 (aged 80); Savannah
- Occupation: Editor
- Spouse: Col. J. Bascom Myrick
- Relatives: The Honorable Shelby Myrick Sr. (son) (Dr.) Colonel Nathaniel Scudder (1st Continental Congress)

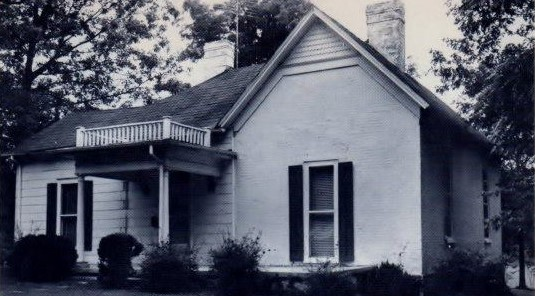
The Scudder Family home on Belmont Avenue in Shelbyville, TN as it appeared in the early 1960s. The home originally had a full second floor which was destroyed by fire in the late 1800s. The home was demolished in the early 2000s.

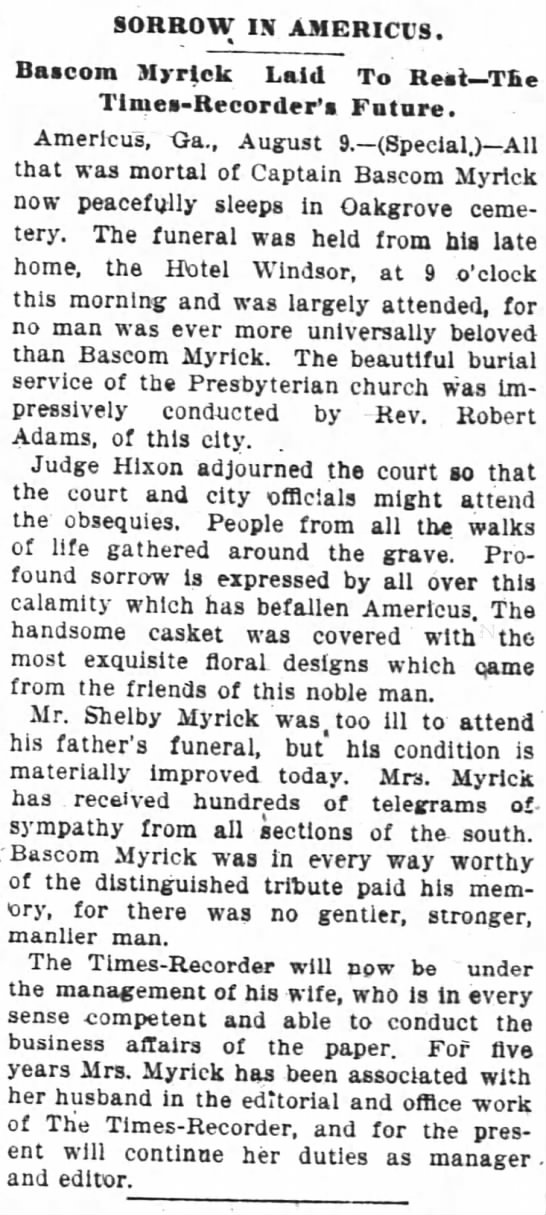
The report on the funeral of Capt. Myrick from the Atlanta Constitution, 1895

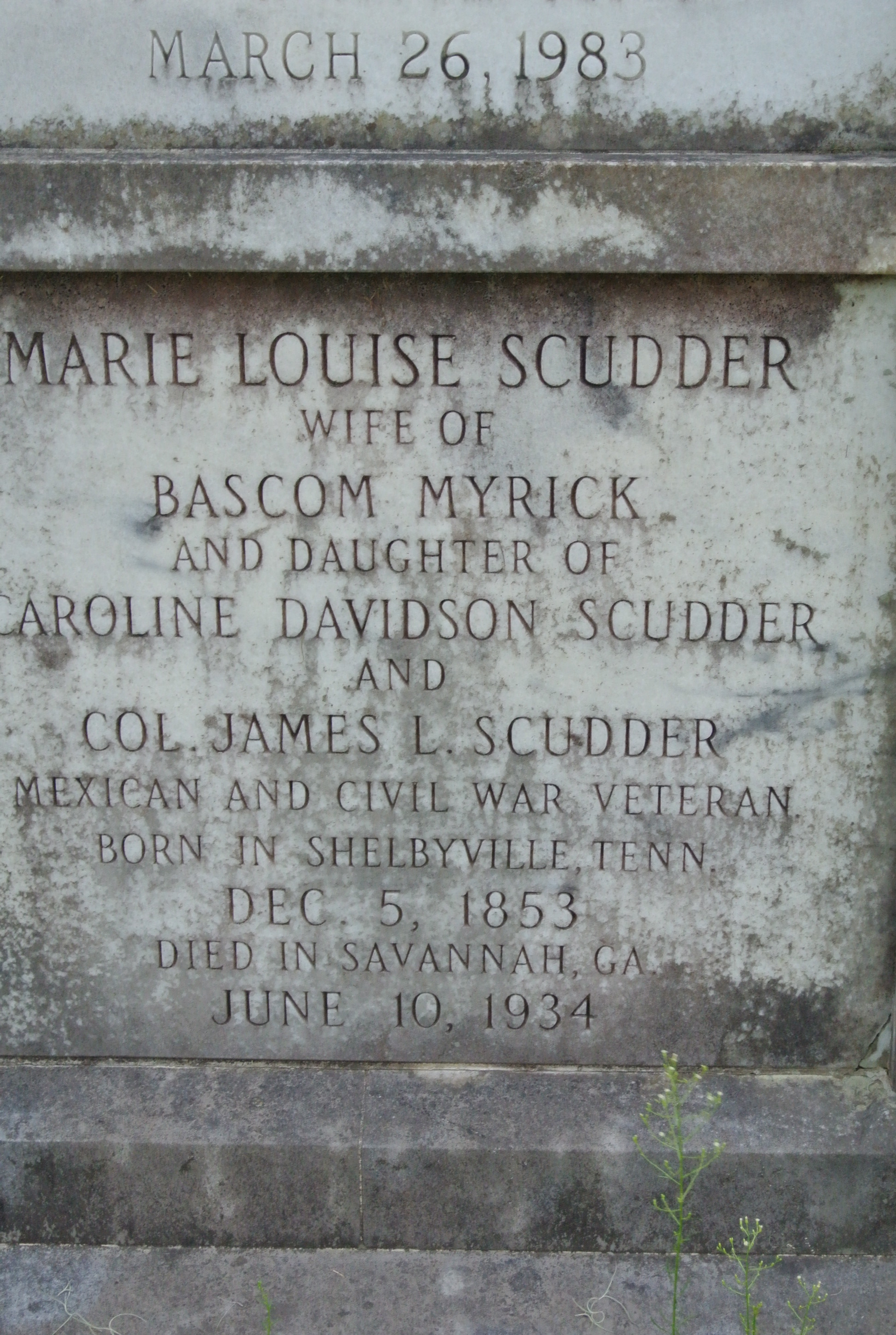
Tomb engraving for Marie Louise Scudder Myrick in Bonaventure Cemetery (Savannah, Georgia)

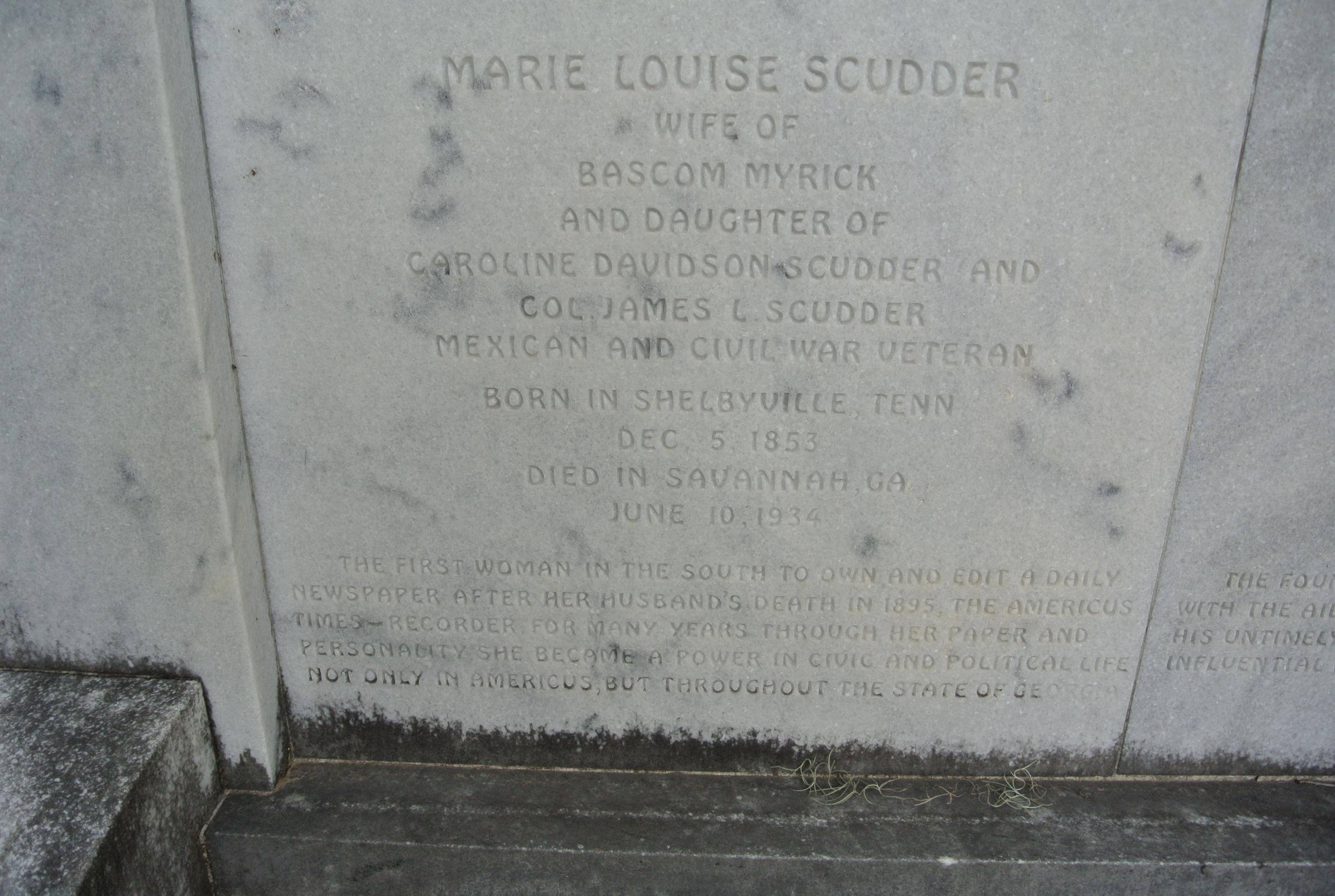
The newer inscription on the Myrick Family Tomb in Savannah, Georgia

Marie Louise Scudder (December 5, 1853 – June 10, 1934) was the owner, manager and editor of the Americus Times.

== Early life (1854 until 1875) ==
Marie Louise Scudder (called Louise throughout her life) was born in 1854 to Colonel James Lockhart Scudder (1823–1882) and Caroline (born Davidson). She was the eldest of seven children. Her father was known in the City of Shelbyville, Tennessee as a "colorful character".

Col. Scudder had enlisted at the outbreak of the Mexican–American War where he reached the rank of First Lieutenant and lost an eye in battle. Upon his return home to Shelbyville, he began the practice of law and worked his way up the ranks. Col. Scudder was the last appointed Attorney General for Bedford County (TN) prior to the Civil War and then was the first elected Attorney General following the Civil War.

== Ancestry ==
Marie Louise was the great-great-granddaughter of Dr. (Colonel) Nathaniel Scudder (1733–1781), a prominent physician and member of the Continental Congress as a representative of New Jersey. Col. Nathaniel Scudder was a graduate of Princeton, a physician, a patriot, and one of two New Jersey delegates to the Continental Congress. He signed the Articles of Confederation, the first constitution of the United States, and was the only member of the Continental Congress to be killed in action during the Revolutionary War, just four short months before Lieutenant General Lord Cornwallis surrendered to Gen. George Washington at Valley Forge.

Louise's maternal grandparents, George Washington Davidson (1800–1854) and Caroline Elizabeth "Betsy" Chilcot (1807–1835), were born in Shelbyville, Tennessee.

== Marriage (1875) ==
Marie Louise married Colonel John Bascom Myrick, of Georgia, on March 30, 1875, in the Episcopal Church of the Redeemer, which was the family's parish on Belmont Avenue in Shelbyville. The Myricks moved to their new residence in Forsyth, Georgia, soon after their marriage, where Col. Myrick pursued a career in banking. Forsyth was the home of Colonel Myrick's family. According to condolence letters still in the possession of the Myrick Family, Louise suffered a miscarriage in 1876. In 1878 they had their only child, Shelby, named for Louise's hometown of Shelbyville.

== Americus, Georgia ==
In 1891, the Myricks relocated from Forsyth, Georgia, to the town of Americus, Georgia, in the Southeast corner of the state. The location of their exact residence from their arrival until about 1892 is still unknown.

Colonel Myrick purchased the Americus Times and the Americus Recorder newspapers, which he consolidated into the Americus Times-Recorder between 1890 and 1891.

=== Americus Times-Recorder ===
In 1892 the Americus Times-Recorder began publication, and remains in publication to this day. Mr. Myrick operated the Times-Recorder until his untimely death in 1895.

At his death, in August 1895, the newspaper was passed to his wife Marie Louise Scudder-Myrick. Mrs. Myrick decided to run the paper on her own which was at the time considered one of the "best and most politically influential papers in the state."

One account of Louise's tenure at the Times-Recorder was:

She is a brilliant newspaper woman, and her work has challenged the admiration of the journalistic fraternity throughout the South.

Mrs. Myrick is said to be the only woman "the South" to own and edit a newspaper. She was the first in Georgia and an outspoken editor. She campaigned for the Daughters of the American Revolution and The Women's Press Club of Georgia.

She retired in 1907, when she sold the Times-Recorder.

=== The Windsor Hotel ===
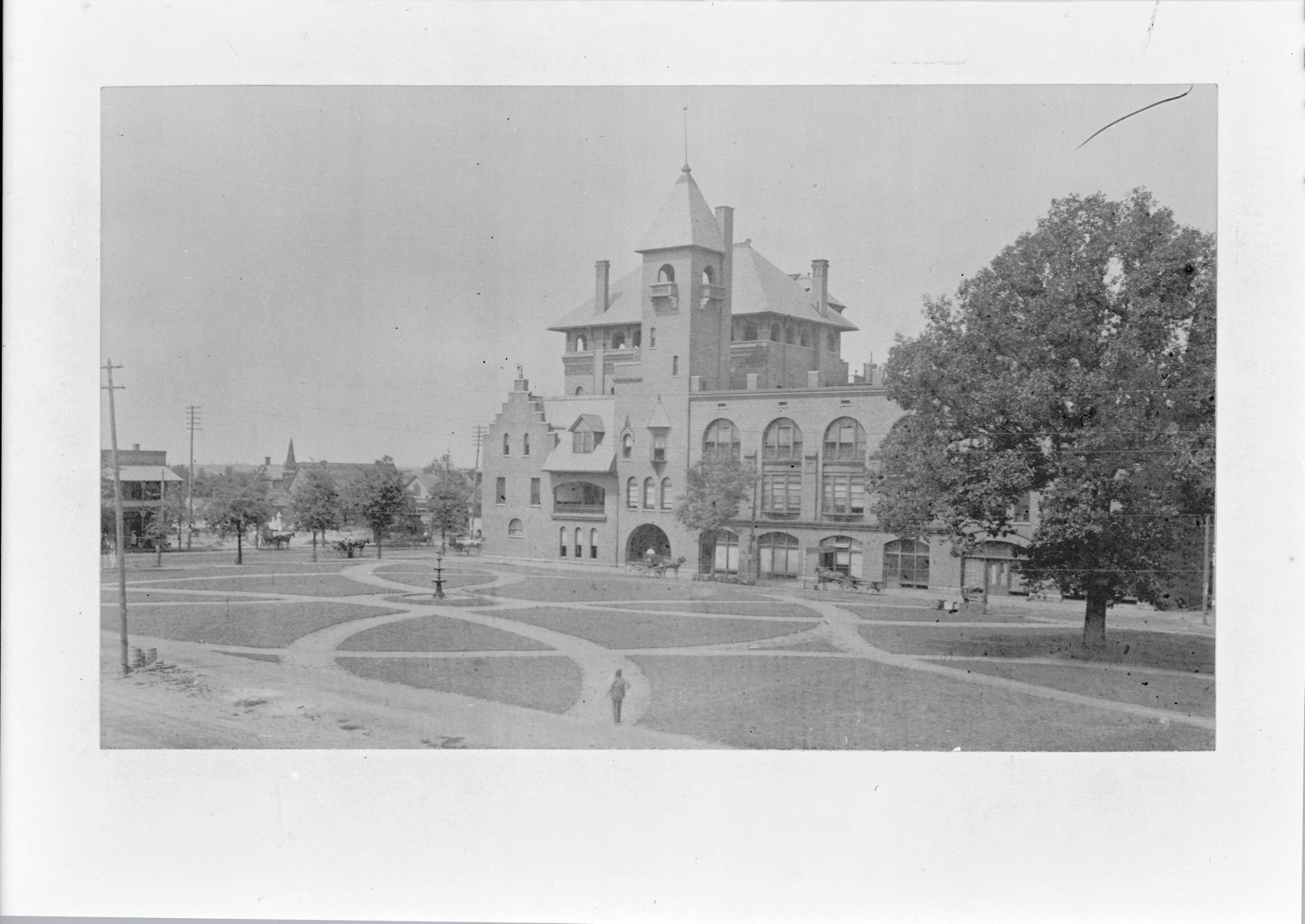
The Windsor Hotel, Americus, Georgia circa 1892

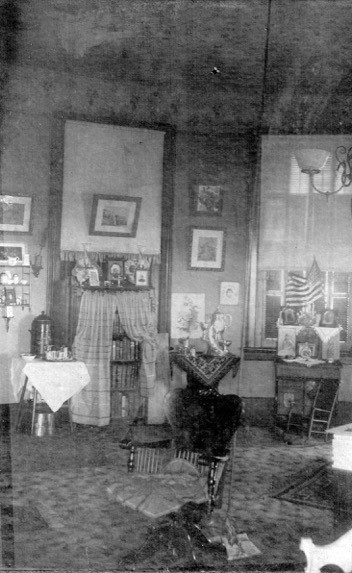
Marie Myrick's apartment in the round Tower of the Windsor Hotel which she called the "Crow's Nest", circa 1900

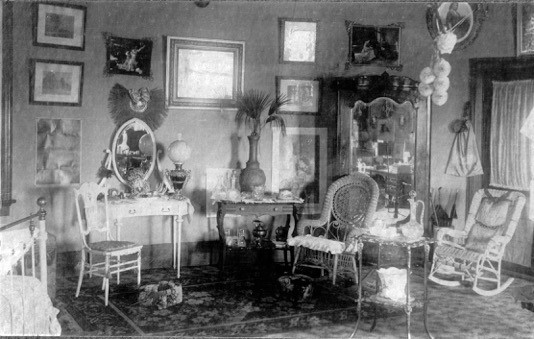
Marie Myrick's apartment in the round Tower of the Windsor Hotel which she called the "Crow's Nest", circa 1900

On June 29, 1892, the new and very grand Windsor Hotel (or Hotel Windsor) opened in Americus. The Myricks moved into the imposing round tower on the top floor, and there they remained until about 1913.

Colonel Myricks Funeral was held out of the Windsor Hotel on August 10, 1895. Mrs. Myrick remained in the apartment on the top of the round tower of the Windsor which she was known as calling the "Crow's Nest".

Mrs. Myrick left Americus, and the Windsor around 1913 and relocation to Savannah, Georgia where she lived with her then bachelor son, Shelby Myrick.

== Savannah, Georgia ==
Upon her arrival in Savannah, Louise moved in with her still unmarried son, Shelby Myrick who was an attorney in the city.

=== Ardsley Park ===
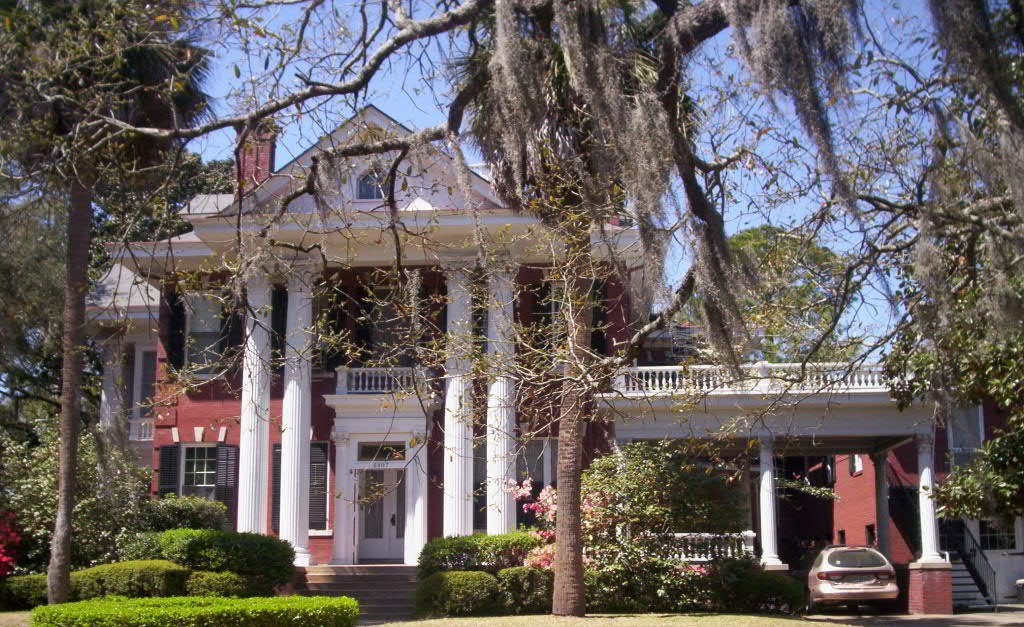
The Myrick Family home at 2807 Abercorn Street in Ardsley Park, Savannah, GA built by Shelby and his mother Marie in 1914.

With the proceeds she had received from the sale of the Americus Times-Recorder, Louis and Shelby began construction of a very grand home in the new Ardsley Park neighborhood of the city. At the time, only one other home was built in this new neighborhood, that of one of the developers.

The imposing red brick colonial was built on a full city block which was made up of 16 lots of the new neighborhood at 2807 Abercorn Street. The home featured multi-story white columns on the three sides of the home facing Abercorn Street, East 46th Street, and what is now known as Myrick Place. The over 6000 square foot home features eight bedrooms and six baths, plus it had tennis courts on the Abercorn side with stables behind on the Myrick Place side.

There are numerous stories of Louise's exploits during her time in Ardsley Park, she was known as a very forthright and colorful character.

Louise lived in this home until her death on June 10, 1934.

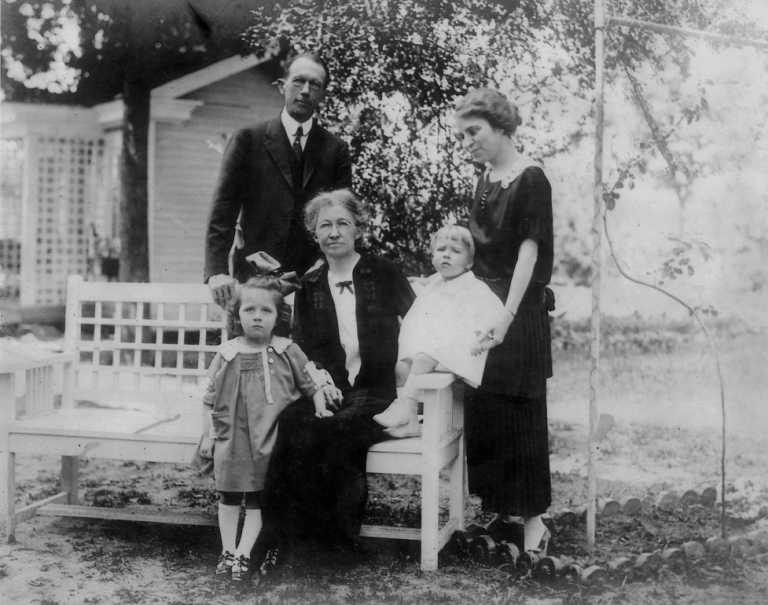
The Myrick Family in Savannah, Georgia. Standing: Shelby Myrick and his wife Mary Ruth Myrick. Seated: Marie Louis Myrick with her grandchildren Mary Ruth (left) and Shelby Jr (Right)

== Death and legacy ==
Prior to her death, she had the remains of her late husband relocated from Oak Grove Cemetery in Americus, Georgia, to the Myrick family's tomb at Bonaventure Cemetery in Savannah. Her own remains were interred there after her own death.

She is still known in small circles throughout the country, none more than in Savannah and especially at Bonaventure Cemetery. Her name appears on numerous maps and documents for the cemetery as one of their "Notable Burials", most recently, the Myrick Tomb is featured on the Illustrated 3D Map of the Historic Bonaventure Cemetery.

== See also ==
- Sarah Porter Hillhouse published a newspaper in Georgia in 1803
- Zula Brown Toole who founded her own newspaper in Miller County, Georgia in 1897
