= Edward Porter Alexander =

Confederate Army general

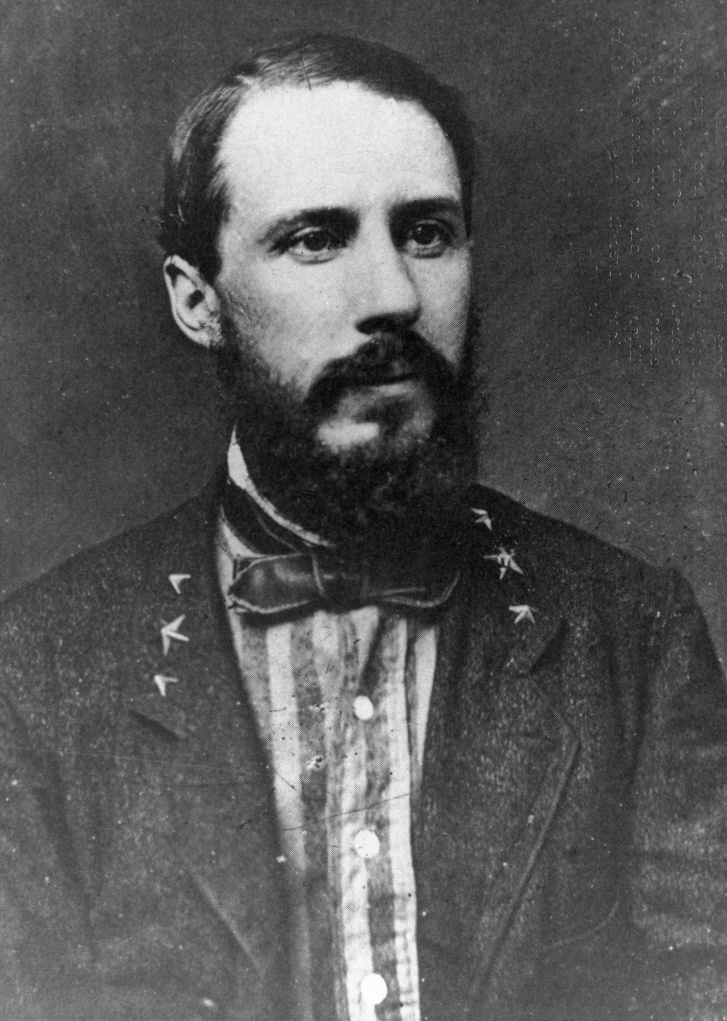
- Photo taken in 1866
- Born: May 26, 1835; Washington, Georgia, US
- Died: April 28, 1910 (aged 74); Savannah, Georgia, US
- Burial place: Magnolia Cemetery (Augusta, Georgia)
- Education: United States Military Academy
- Military career
- Allegiance: United States; Confederate States of America
- Branch: U.S. Army; Confederate States Army
- Service years: 1857–1861 (USA); 1861–1865 (CSA)
- Rank: Second Lieutenant (USA); Brigadier General (CSA)
- Commands: Artillery
- Conflicts: American Civil War; First Battle of Bull Run; Peninsula Campaign; Battle of Williamsburg; Battle of Gaines' Mill; Northern Virginia Campaign; Second Battle of Bull Run; Maryland Campaign; Battle of Antietam; Battle of Fredericksburg; Battle of Chancellorsville; Battle of Gettysburg; Knoxville Campaign; Overland Campaign; Battle of Spotsylvania Court House; Battle of Cold Harbor; Richmond-Petersburg Campaign; Battle of the Crater; Battle of Chaffin's Farm
- Other work: Railroad executive, planter, and author

Signature
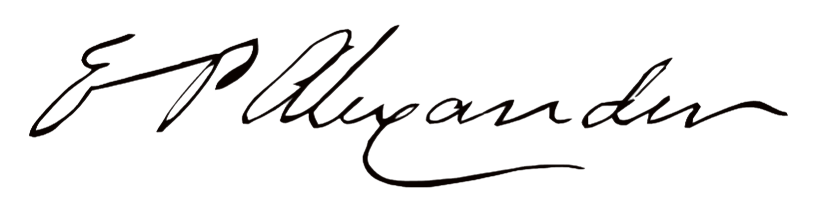

Edward Porter Alexander (May 26, 1835 – April 28, 1910) was an American military engineer, railroad executive, planter, and author. He served first as an officer in the United States Army and later, during the American Civil War (1861–1865), in the Confederate Army, rising to the rank of brigadier general.

Alexander was the officer in charge of the massive artillery bombardment preceding Pickett's Charge, on the third day of the Battle of Gettysburg, and is also noted for his early use of signals and observation balloons during combat. After the Civil War, he taught mathematics at the University of South Carolina in Columbia, spent time in Nicaragua, and wrote extensive memoirs and analyses of the war, which have received much praise for their insight and objectivity. His Military Memoirs of a Confederate were published in 1907. An extensive personal account of his military training and his participation in the Civil War was rediscovered long after his death and published in 1989 as Fighting for the Confederacy.

== Early life and career ==
Alexander, known to his friends as Porter, was born in Washington, Georgia, into a wealthy and distinguished family of planters from the Antebellum South. He was the sixth of ten children of Adam Leopold Alexander and Sarah Hillhouse Gilbert Alexander. His mother was the granddaughter of Sarah Porter Hillhouse, the first female editor and printer in the United States. He became the brother-in-law of Alexander R. Lawton and Jeremy F. Gilmer. He graduated from the United States Military Academy at West Point in 1857, third in his class of 38 cadets, and was brevetted a second lieutenant of engineers. He briefly taught engineering and fencing at the academy before he was ordered to report for the Utah War expedition to Brig. Gen. Albert Sidney Johnston. That mission ended before he could reach Johnston, and Alexander returned to West Point. He participated in a number of weapon experiments and worked as an assistant to Major Albert J. Myer, the first officer assigned to the Signal Corps and the inventor of the code for "wig-wag" signal flags, or "aerial telegraphy". Alexander was promoted to second lieutenant on October 10, 1858.

Alexander met Bettie Mason of Virginia in 1859 and married her on April 3, 1860. They would eventually have six children: Bessie Mason (born 1861), Edward Porter Jr. and Lucy Roy (twins, born 1863), an unnamed girl (1865, died in infancy prior to naming), Adam Leopold (1867), and William Mason (1868). Lieutenant Alexander's final assignments for the U.S. Army were at Fort Steilacoom, in the Washington Territory, and at Alcatraz Island, near San Francisco, California.

== Civil War service ==
=== Beginning of war ===
After learning of the secession of his home state of Georgia, Alexander resigned his U.S. Army commission on May 1, 1861, to join the Confederate Army as a captain of engineers. While organizing and training new recruits to form a Confederate signal service, he was ordered to report to Brig. Gen. P.G.T. Beauregard at Manassas Junction, Virginia. He became the chief engineer and signal officer of the Confederate Army of the Potomac on June 3.

At the First Battle of Bull Run, Alexander made history by being the first to use signal flags to transmit a message during combat over a long distance. Stationed atop "Signal Hill" in Manassas, Alexander saw Union troop movements and signaled to the brigade under Col. Nathan "Shanks" Evans, "Look out for your left, your position is turned". Upon receiving a similar message, Beauregard and Gen. Joseph E. Johnston sent timely reinforcements that turned the tide of battle in the Confederates' favor.

Alexander was promoted to major on July 1 and lieutenant colonel on December 31, 1861. During much of this period he was chief of ordnance, under Johnston's command, managing supplies and ammunition in what later became the Army of Northern Virginia. He was also active in signal work and intelligence gathering, dealing extensively with spies operating around Washington, D.C.

During the early days of the Peninsula Campaign of 1862, Alexander continued as chief of ordnance under Johnston, but he also fought at the Battle of Williamsburg, under Maj. Gen. James Longstreet. When Gen. Robert E. Lee assumed command of the army, Alexander was in charge of pre-positioned ordnance for Lee's offensive in the Seven Days Battles. Alexander continued his intelligence gathering by volunteering to go up in an observation balloon at Gaines' Mill on June 27, ascending several times and returning with valuable intelligence regarding the position of the Union Army.

Alexander continued in charge of ordnance for the Northern Virginia Campaign (Second Bull Run) and the Maryland Campaign (Antietam). He barely missed capture by Federal cavalry, under Col. Benjamin F. "Grimes" Davis, that had escaped from Harpers Ferry during the Maryland Campaign; over 40 of Longstreet's 80 ammunition wagons were captured.

Porter Alexander is best known as an artilleryman who played a prominent role in many of the important battles of the war. He served in different artillery capacities for Longstreet's First Corps of the Army of Northern Virginia, starting that role on November 7, 1862, after leaving Lee's staff to command the battalion that was the corps' artillery reserve. He was promoted to colonel on December 5. He was instrumental in arranging the artillery in defense of Marye's Heights at the Battle of Fredericksburg in December 1862, which proved to be the decisive factor in the Confederate victory. While the rest of Longstreet's corps was located around Suffolk, Virginia, Alexander accompanied Stonewall Jackson on his flanking march at the Battle of Chancellorsville in May 1863, and his artillery placements in Hazel Grove at Chancellorsville proved decisive.

=== Gettysburg cannonade ===
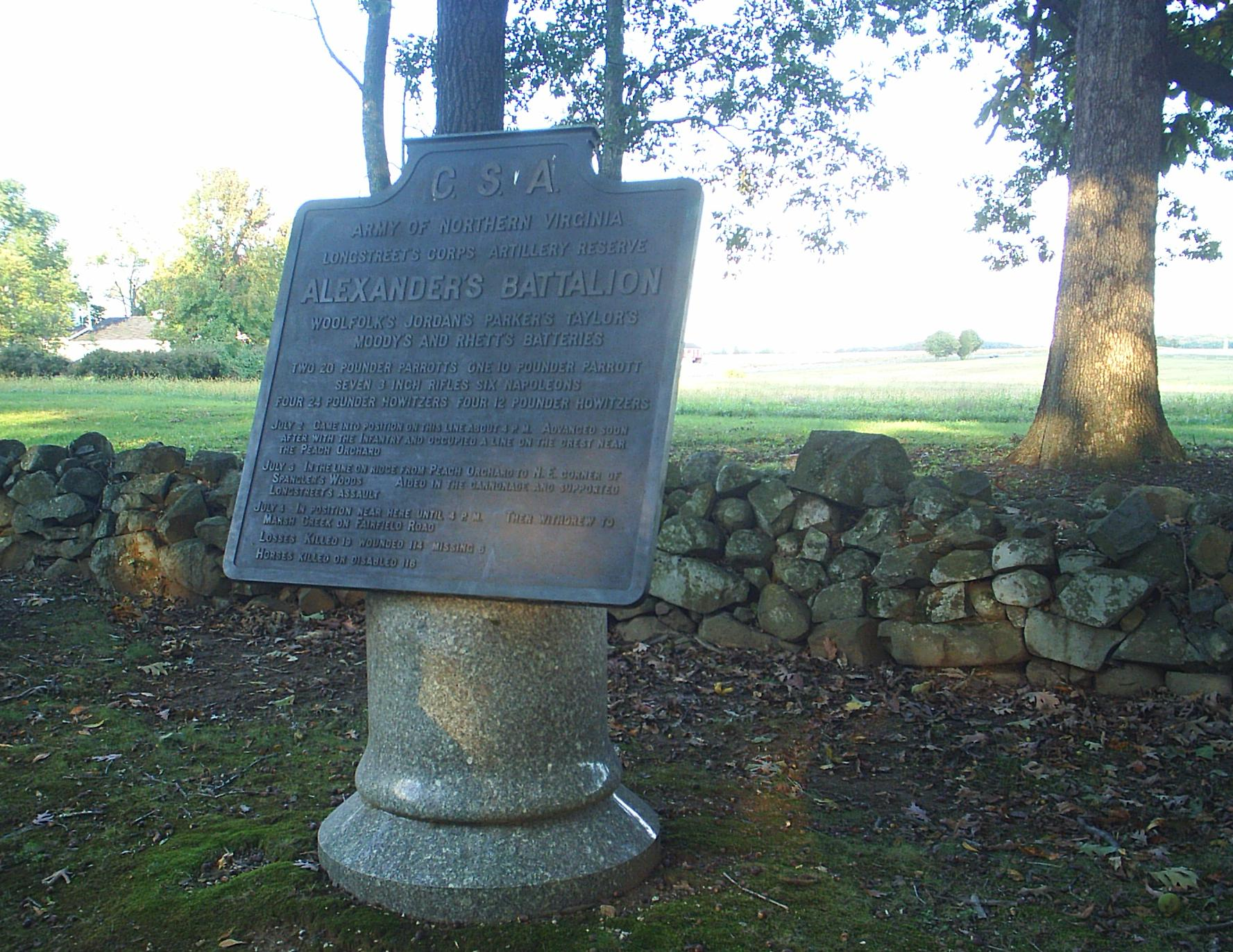
This monument on Seminary Ridge marks the location of Alexander's artillery.

At the Battle of Gettysburg, Confederate artillery was outmatched in number of pieces, gunnery training, and especially quality and quantity of ammunition. The then 28 year old Alexander was in charge of artillery preparation for Pickett's Charge, and given responsibility for assessing its success. The two hours' bombardment was the largest of the war, and explosions in the rear of the Union line caused by overshooting, in combination with Union guns deceptively ceasing to fire, made it seem to have destroyed enemy artillery. However, when the charge began, Union cannon opened up and inflicted severe casualties on the attackers. In his memoir, Alexander bemoaned that an artillery duel earlier in the multi-day battle had already wasted a lot of ammunition from the limited amount the Confederates had available, and that he lacked the authority to concentrate all Confederate artillery present for the bombardment. In his later writings, Alexander accused Lee of making fundamental errors at Gettysburg, as the Union position on high ground was too strong for an attack to be advisable, and Lee had ordered the assault on the center, which entailed Confederates advancing for three quarters of a mile while under fire and then being enfiladed as they closed with the Union line. Writing in 1901 Alexander said "Never, never, never did Gen. Lee himself bollox [sic] a fight as he did this."

=== Longstreet's chief of artillery ===
Alexander accompanied the First Corps to northern Georgia in the fall of 1863 to reinforce General Braxton Bragg for the Battle of Chickamauga. He personally arrived too late to participate in the battle but served as Longstreet's chief of artillery in the subsequent Knoxville Campaign and in the Department of East Tennessee in early 1864. He returned with the corps to Virginia for the remainder of the war, now with the rank of brigadier general (as of February 26, 1864). He served in all the battles of the Overland Campaign, and when Lieutenant General Ulysses S. Grant slipped around Lee's army to cross the James River and assault Petersburg, Alexander was able to move his guns quickly through the lines, emplacing them to repel the main attack.

During the Siege of Petersburg, Alexander had to adapt his artillery tactics to trench warfare, including experimentation with various types of mortars. He became convinced that the Union forces were attempting to tunnel under the Confederate lines, but before he was able to act on this, on June 30, 1864, he was wounded in the shoulder by a sharpshooter. As he departed on medical leave to Georgia, he informed Lee of his suspicion. After unsuccessful attempts were made to locate the tunneling activity, the Battle of the Crater caught the Confederates by surprise although it ended in a significant Union defeat. Alexander returned to the Army in February 1865 and supervised the defenses of Richmond along the James River. He retreated along with Lee's army in the Appomattox Campaign.

At Appomattox Court House, it was Alexander who made the famous proposal to Lee for the army to disperse, rather than surrender. Lee rebuked him, and Alexander later wrote about regretting his suggestion. Although the incident is sometimes described as a proposal for "guerrilla war", Alexander describes his proposal in his memoir, Fighting for the Confederacy, as one in which "the army may be ordered to scatter in the woods & bushes & either to rally upon Gen. Johnston in North Carolina, or to make their way, each man to his own state, with his arms, & to report to his governor."

=== Confederate gold ===
Since the end of the Civil War, stories of the Confederate gold and its vast wealth have been told and retold. One of these stories involves Alexander. He helped organize search parties in Lincoln and Wilkes counties. Alexander and bank officials soon located some of the gold through Alexander's neighbors in Wilkes County and persuaded them that the money belonged to wives and children of Confederate veterans. With Alexander's help, bank officials eventually recovered some $111,000 of the stolen money. Former Confederate cabinet official Robert Toombs also turned over $5,000 that, intentionally or accidentally, had been thrown into his yard in Washington.

== Later life ==
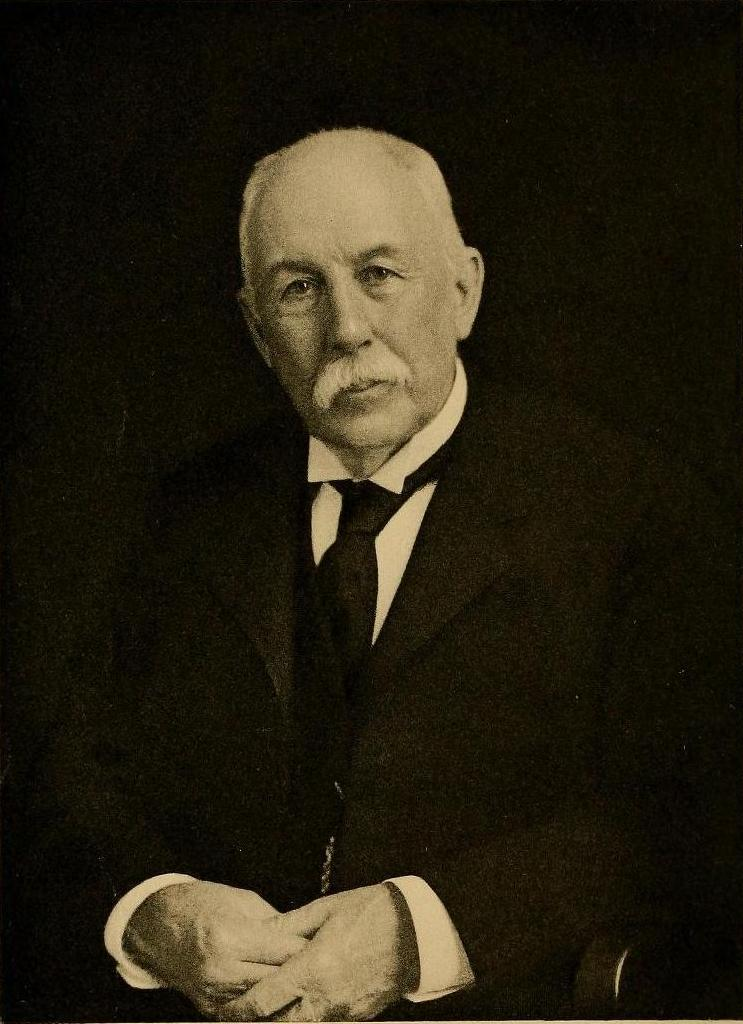
Edward Porter Alexander in the 1900s

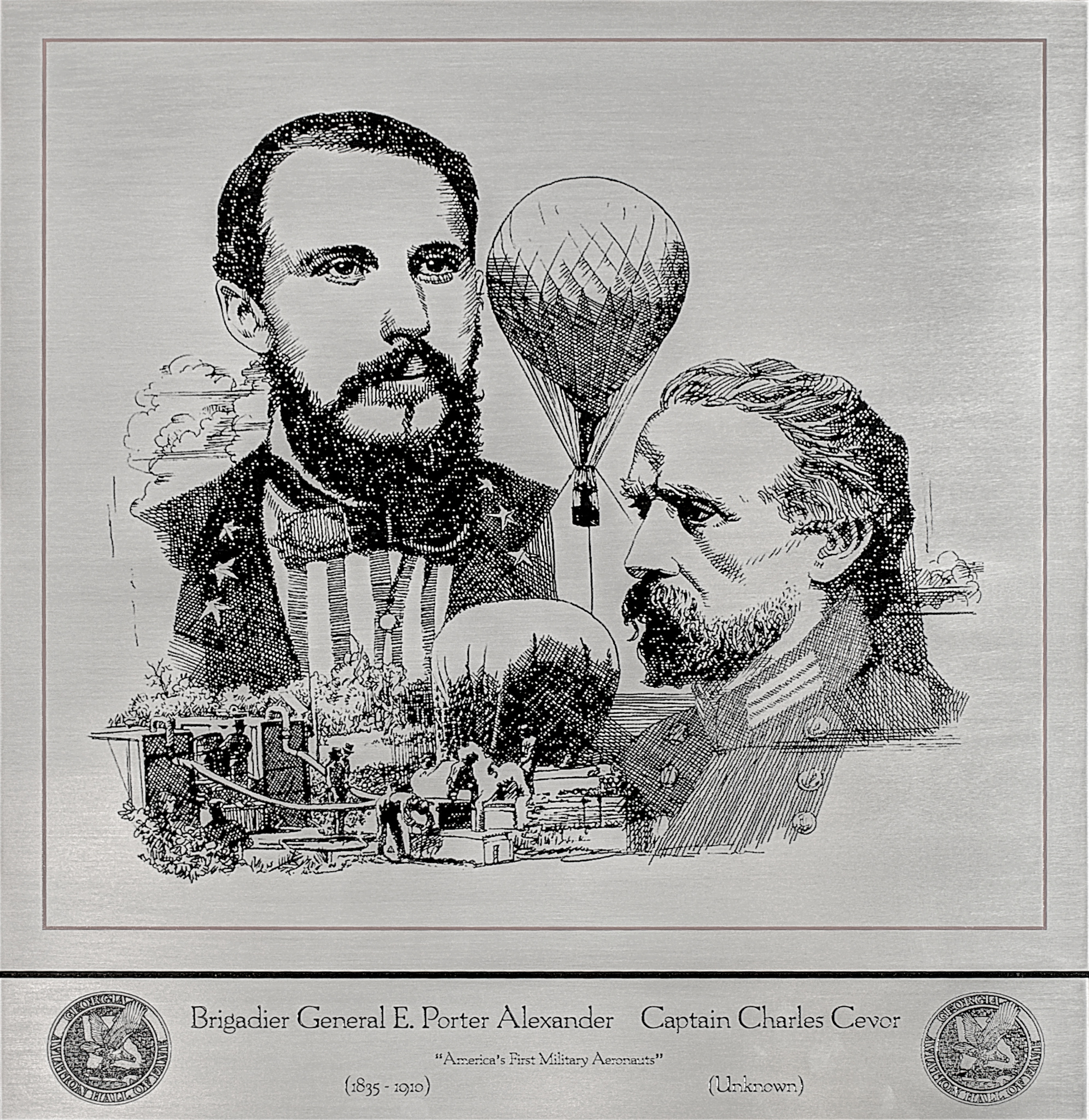
Plaque honoring Alexander and Charles Cevor at the Georgia Aviation Hall of Fame

After the surrender, Alexander briefly considered joining the Imperial Brazilian Army. Finding that he no longer desired the Georgia plantation life of his youth, he taught mathematics at the University of South Carolina in Columbia, and then served in executive positions with the Charlotte, Columbia, and Augusta Railroad (executive superintendent), the Savannah and Memphis Railroad (president), the Louisville and Nashville Railroad (president), and Central Rail Road and Banking Company of Georgia from 1886 until 1891. During his employment at the Savannah and Memphis Railroad, the decision was made to route the railroad through Youngsville, Alabama. Youngsville was later renamed Alexander City in his honor.

Alexander was a member of the boards on the navigation of the Columbia River, Oregon, and on the ship canal between Chesapeake and Delaware bays, from 1892 to 1894. He became friends with Grover Cleveland and the two spent many hours hunting for ducks on Alexander's estate. The estate covered much of North, South, and Cat Islands in Winyah Bay; with the decline of rice production in the late 1800s, Alexander converted the properties into a hunting preserve. From the islands, Alexander also tracked the 1893 Sea Islands hurricane.

In May 1897, President Cleveland appointed Alexander as the arbiter of the commission tasked with fixing and demarcating the boundary between the Republics of Nicaragua and Costa Rica, with a view towards the possible construction of an interoceanic canal to be dug across Central America. Alexander spent two years at the head of that commission, headquartered in the coastal village of Greytown (now San Juan de Nicaragua). He completed the work to the satisfaction of the two governments and returned to the U.S. in October 1899. His wife Bettie became ill while he was in Nicaragua and she died shortly after his return, on November 20, 1899. In October 1901, Alexander married Mary Mason, his first wife's niece.

Alexander was selected to give the Confederate veteran's speech on Alumni Day during the centennial celebration at the United States Military Academy on June 9, 1902. The speech was so well received that it was reprinted in The New York Times in its entirety in the 15 June 1902 edition. The Times referred to the speech as "decidedly the feature of Alumni Day."

Alexander suffered a stroke in September 1902, and continued to have similar medical issues thereafter. In January 1910, he had a severe stroke, which was followed by an arteriosclerosis diagnosis. He died on April 28, 1910, at Savannah, having fallen into a coma the day before.

After the war, Alexander became a well-respected author. He wrote many magazine articles and published his Military Memoirs of a Confederate: A Critical Narrative (1907), praised by Douglas Southall Freeman as "altogether the best critique of the operations of the Army of Northern Virginia." Long after his death, it was realized that Alexander had produced the Military Memoirs, which sought to be a professional work of military history and analysis, after a long effort of editing a collection of much more personal memoirs that he had started compiling during his time in Greytown, Nicaragua, at the behest of his family. Those earlier memoirs were edited and published posthumously in 1989 as Fighting for the Confederacy: The Personal Recollections of General Edward Porter Alexander, edited by Gary W. Gallagher.

Unlike such Confederate officers as Jubal Early and William Pendleton, Alexander eschewed the bitter Lost Cause theories of why the South was doomed to fail, given the overwhelming superiority of the North. He was willing to express in writing his criticisms of prominent Confederate officers, including General Lee himself. Many historians regard Alexander's memoirs as among the most objective and sharpest sources produced by a Civil War combatant. David Eicher called Fighting for the Confederacy "a superb personal narrative with a good deal of analysis of Lee's operations ... Dramatic and revealing, an important source on the general, his fellow officers, and the Army of Northern Virginia." Alexander's other books include Railway Practice (1887) and Catterel, Ratterel (Doggerel) (1888). Alexander died in Savannah, Georgia and is buried in Magnolia Cemetery, Augusta, Georgia. In 2006 he was inducted into the Georgia Aviation Hall of Fame.

== See also ==
- List of American Civil War generals (Confederate)
