= John M. Paschall =

North Carolina reconstruction era politician

Justice of the peace
- In office 1868–1874

North Carolina Senate
- In office 1874–1875

Personal details
- Born: 1826/7 North Carolina
- Died: April 1, 1886
- Party: Republican

John M. Paschall (1826/7 – April 1, 1886) was a farmer, carpenter and politician in North Carolina. He served as a judge, county commissioner and state legislator in North Carolina. He served in the North Carolina Senate from 1874 to 1875 representing Warren County during the Reconstruction era. He was one of four Republican state senators in North Carolina during that session. There were thirteen African American House members. Both bodies had large Democratic Party majorities.

== Biography ==
He was born in North Carolina 1826/7. Described as literate and mulatto, he worked as a farmer and carpenter. Paschall married Mary J Wright December 25, 1856.

He was a justice of the peace from 1868 to 1874, as well as serving as a county commissioner.

Paschall was nominated for the senate in 1874 over J. Williams Thorne to represent Warren County, and was duly elected.

He died April 1, 1886, with the newspaper remarking that he was "a very respectable and intelligent colored man."

== See also ==
- African American officeholders from the end of the Civil War until before 1900
