= Emily Barnelia Woodward =

American journalist (1885–1970)

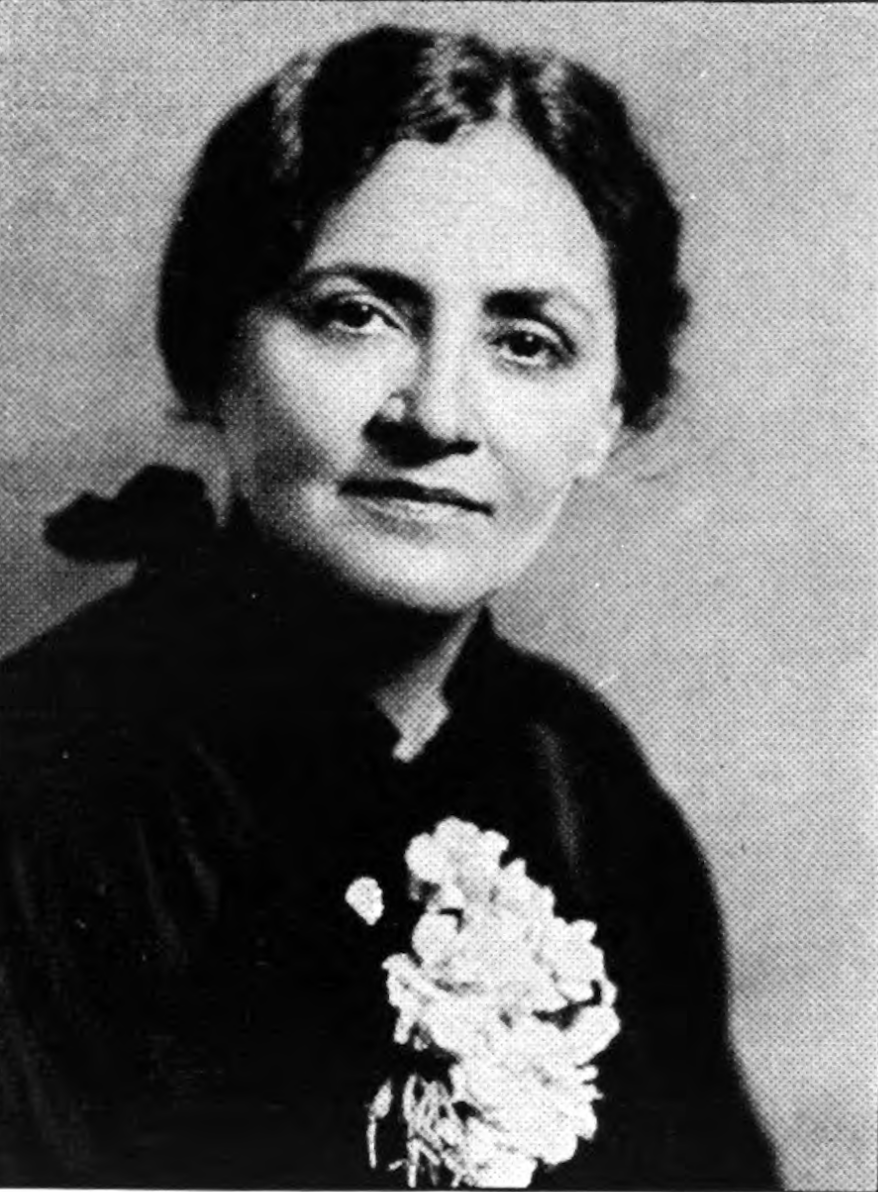
- Woodward circa 1937
- Born: Emily Barnelia Woodward; Vienna, Georgia, U.S.
- Died: Vienna, Georgia, U.S.
- Education: Gordon State College; LaGrange College
- Occupation: Journalist
- Writing career
- Notable awards: Georgia Newspaper Hall of Fame; Georgia Women of Achievement

Emily Barnelia Woodward (May 2, 1885 – March 23, 1970) was an American journalist and advocate. She served as the editor for the Vienna News and later became its sole owner. Later in life, she became actively involved in advocating in several areas relating to reforms in Georgia. Woodward was posthumously inducted into the Georgia Newspaper Hall of Fame and the Georgia Women of Achievement.

== Biography ==
=== Early life and career ===
Woodward was born on May 2, 1885, on a large plantation near the south-central town of Vienna, Georgia. She was the daughter of Nancy Barnelia McCormick and John Hartwell Woodward, and grew up in a comfortable affluent household. She had one brother. Woodward attended public schools across in the Vienna area, and graduated from Gordon State College in 1910. She began a career in journalism six years later when she was made the editor of the Vienna News, which had been brought by members of her family and became its editor in 1917. Woodward was made the sole owner of the newspaper in 1918. She wanted to become involved in journalism from an early age, and studied law from her brother's office, though she disliked the subject. In the period she was editor, Woodward became one of the most recognizable journalistic women in the Southern United States, and had close connections with the University of Georgia's journalist faculty.

In August 1927, Woodward was elected the first women president of the Georgia Press Association, and in the following year, she founded the Georgia Press Institute, which organizes annual gatherings of newspaper editors in Georgia. She became a member of the State Democratic Committee and attended the 1928 Democratic National Convention. Woodward sold Vienna News in 1933, and three years later, she authored the book Empire: Georgia Today in Pictures and Paragraphs, which is centred on the first visual photographs of Georgia's history. Her popularity increased throughout the 1930s when she was a freelance journalist for the Atlanta Journal, which led to a high demand for her to speak at events across the United States. Due to this, Woodward was invited to direct the Georgia Public Forums, a direct adult education program that started in the fall of 1938.

She became a fervid New Deal Democrat, and courted controversy in the 1940s when she advocated for the reform of prisons by holding town hall meetings at Atlanta Federal Penitentiary; she took part in the 1943 Atlanta Conference on Race Relations. Woodward became an advocate of training and empowering leaders in Georgia. Her book, Forums: Why and How was published by the University of Georgia Press in 1943. She was the University of Georgia's Director of Forums between 1938 and 1944, and was the founder of the university's first Leadership Institute; she held the post of its director from 1943 to 1950. Woodward flew to Great Britain in 1944 at the invitation of the British Ministry of War Information and the United States Office of War Information to hold forums to people in England and Scotland for 12 weeks with the intention of improving United Kingdom–United States relations. Woodward broadcast on BBC Radio while under attack from Axis bombing.

=== Later career, death, and legacy ===
After World War II ended, she was asked by the United States Department of State and the United States Department of War to serve on Douglas MacArthur's committee on education starting from February 1946. She flew to Japan where she travelled to the schools in the country, and discussed on what tasks need to be completed to help modernize their education system. After returning to Georgia, Woodward was an early proponent on saving the public schools of the state when advocates of segregation wanted them to be closed due to Brown v. Board of Education, and in the early 1960s. she was one of two people from outside of Atlanta that signed on to join the city's H.O.P.E. (Help Our Public Education) project. She died in Vienna, Georgia, on March 23, 1970. In her lifetime, Woodward was awarded honorary degrees from the University of Georgia and LaGrange College, and was made an inductee of the Georgia Newspaper Hall of Fame in 1976. She was posthumously inducted into the Georgia Women of Achievement in a ceremony held at Wesleyan College on March 11, 2004.
