= The American City (magazine) =

American municipal affairs magazine

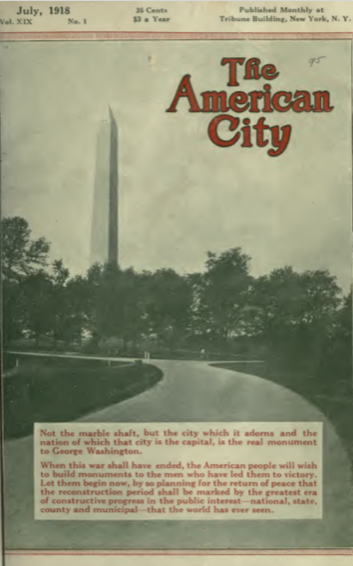
- The American City magazine cover July 1918
- Editor: Arthur Hastings Grant, Harold S. Buttenheim
- Frequency: Monthly
- Publisher: American City Publishing Company
- Founder: Harold S. Buttenheim
- Founded: 1909
- First issue: September 1909
- Country: USA
- Based in: New York City
- Language: English
- OCLC: 839132181

The American City was an American municipal affairs and urban planning magazine published by the Buttenheim Publication Corporation from 1909 through 1942. It was based in New York City. The publication was primarily concerned with the design, care, and maintenance of civic infrastructure such as roads, parks, public buildings and public safety design. It was intended to be read by municipal officials and civic workers. There were two separate editions of The American City, a city and a "town and country" edition. These merged in 1920.

It was edited by Arthur Hastings Grant until 1911 and then by Harold S. Buttenheim through 1942. The Buttenheim Brothers, Harold and Edgar, also founded the American City Bureau, which raised funds for local Community Chests,YMCA YWCAs, and similar organizations.
