= William F. Marlar Memorial Foundation =

Philanthropic foundation

- Founder: Frieda M. Marlar
- Type: 501(c)(3)
- Location: Aurora, Colorado

The William F. Marlar Memorial Foundation is a private philanthropic foundation supporting scholarship in the Space Sciences.

== Programs ==
• Marlar Library at the University of California at San Diego

• Marlar Scholarship granted by the Rice Space Institute

• William F. Marlar Award at Rice University

• William F. Marlar Memorial Lecture at Rice University

• William F. Marlar Faculty Lounge at the MIT Kavli Institute for Astrophysics and Space Research.

== History ==
The foundation's namesake, William F. Marlar, owner and operator of Bill's Cab Company in Denver, Colorado, had a passionate interest in Space Sciences and space exploration. When he was tragically disabled in a robbery, his wife, Frieda M. Marlar, assumed management of the business, which prospered under her leadership.

When the Soviets launched Sputnik 1 in 1957, Mrs. Marlar felt that American ingenuity and technical knowledge should be stimulated from the private sector with the goal of equalling and then surpassing the Soviet space program. To support this goal she established the William F. Marlar Memorial Foundation in memory of her husband's passion for space and space exploration.

At Mrs. Marlar's death in 1968, the majority of her assets went into the foundation, which continues to support the foundation's mission through grants to academic institutions. The trustees who administer the foundation are also the directors of the cab company established by the Marlars.
