= Susan Dowdell Myrick =

American journalist, educator, author, conservationist (1893–1978)

Susan Myrick
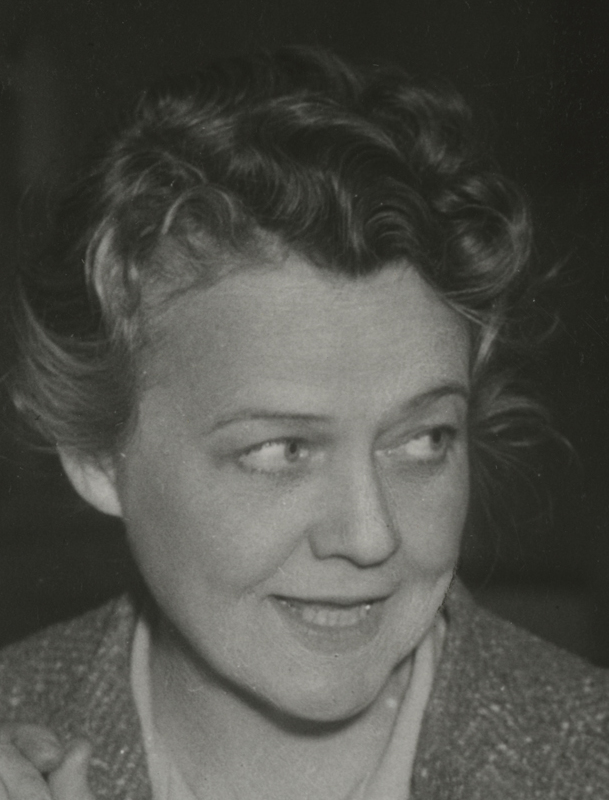
- Myrick on the set of Gone with the Wind (1939)
- Born: Susan Dowdell Myrick; February 20, 1893; Baldwin County, Georgia, United States
- Died: September 3, 1978 (aged 85); Macon, Georgia
- Resting place: Memory Hill Cemetery; Milledgeville, Georgia
- Education: Georgia Normal and Industrial College
- Occupations: Journalist, educator, author, dialect coach

Susan "Sue" Dowdell Myrick (February 20, 1893 – September 3, 1978) was an American journalist, educator, author, and conservationist. Her friendship with author Margaret Mitchell led to Myrick's role as a technical advisor and dialect coach during the production of Gone with the Wind (1939), ensuring the film accurately portrayed the accents, customs, and manners of the South. Due to this expertise she has been called the "Emily Post of the South". Myrick also was a columnist, reporter, and associate editor for Macon-based newspaper The Telegraph, working at the paper for fifty years.

== Early life and education ==
Myrick was born to James Dowdell Myrick and Thulia Katherine Myrick (née Whitehurst) on February 20, 1893, on the 1,000-acre Dovedale Plantation in Baldwin County, Georgia, the fifth out of eight siblings. She studied education at Georgia Normal and Industrial College from 1910 to 1911, and taught physical education there following her graduating. Myrick also taught at the Student Normal School of Physical Education in Battle Creek, Michigan, from 1913 to 1914, where she also studied at the American Medical Missionary College. In 1916 she moved to Hastings, Nebraska, where she was the public school's physical education supervisor. The next year Myrick attended a physical education program at Harvard University during the summer before moving back to Georgia.

== Career ==
=== Physical education ===
Myrick worked for the Georgia Department of Education from 1918 through 1922, after which she served as director of physical education at Lanier High School for Girls from 1923 to 1928.

=== The Telegraph ===
While working at Lanier High School, Myrick started writing an advice column geared towards young girls and women called "Life in a Tangle" for Macon's Telegraph. The articles were published under the pseudonym "Fannie Squeers" and quickly became popular, leading Myrick to quit teaching and begin working for the Telegraph full-time in 1928. She continued her work as a columnist, wrote recipes, features, and obituaries.

Myrick joined the Georgia Press Association through which she became acquainted with a variety of journalists and reporters, including Sherwood Anderson and, notably, fellow Georgia native Margaret Mitchell. Myrick and Mitchell soon became close friends, often visiting each other in Macon and Atlanta, respectively, "sit[ting] up all night talking". Additionally, Myrick became a member of the Macon Writers' Club.

She briefly also wrote for Telegraph-owned The News in 1940, and was editor of the Telegraph's Sunday-edition Georgia Magazine.

After the outbreak of World War II, Myrick began working as the Telegraph's war editor; after the war she served as farm editor starting in 1946, producing a page each Sunday, and she was made associate editor in 1948. She was given an award by the Women's National Press Club in 1950.

Despite retiring as associate editor in January 1967, Myrick continued to publish two editorial columns a week for over a decade – her last column for the Telegraph was published on August 17, 1978, less than a month before her death.

=== Gone with the Wind ===
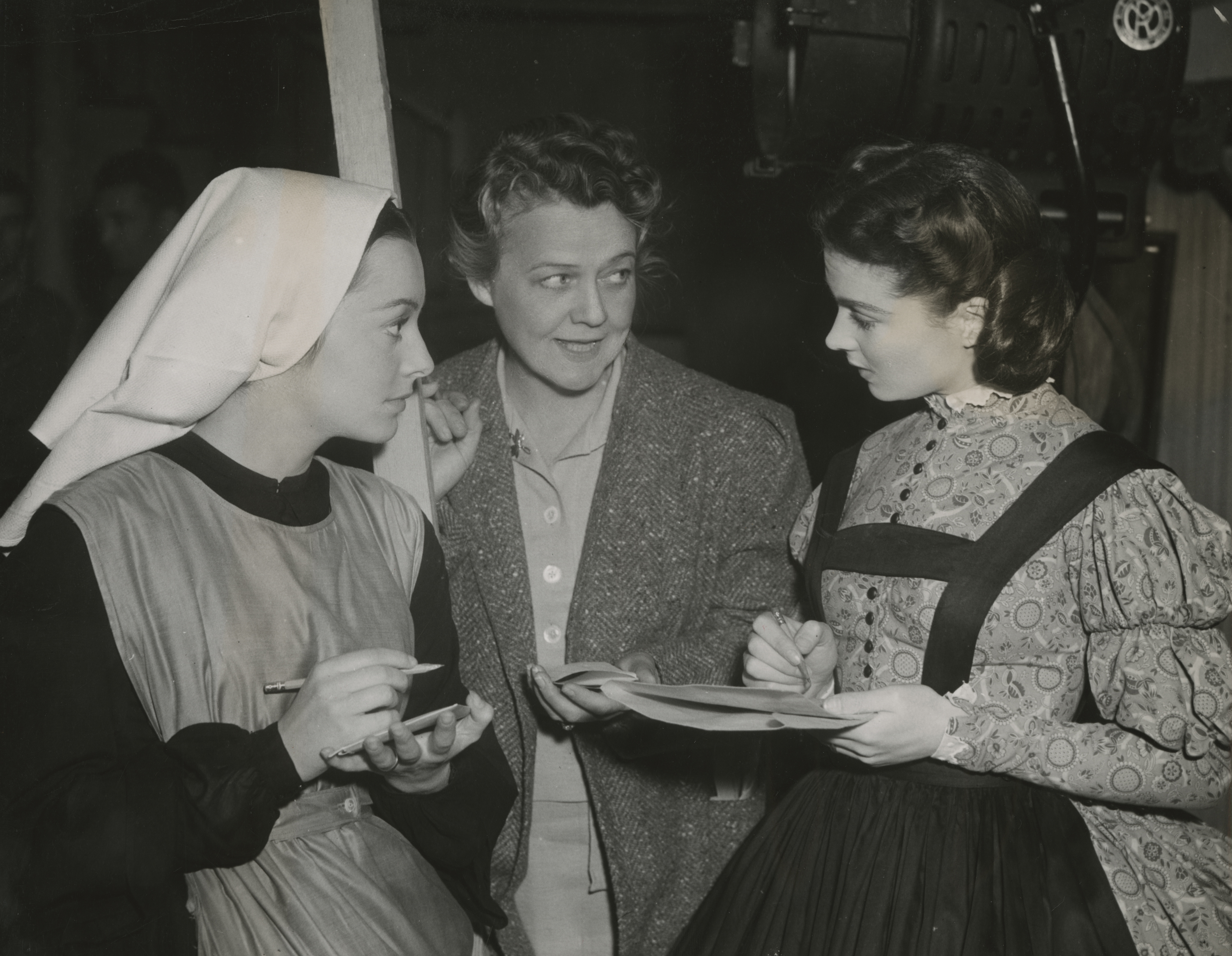
Myrick (center) coaching Olivia de Havilland and Vivien Leigh during production of Gone with the Wind.

When production first started on the 1939 film adaptation of Margaret Mitchell's novel Gone with the Wind (1936), Mitchell recommended to producer David O. Selznick that Myrick should be a consultant on the film. Myrick spent six weeks in Los Angeles coaching the actors on how to speak with a Southern accent (Selznick International wrote in a letter that she was "one of the best authorities on this matter, who will come to the studio from Atlanta just for this particular job"), and her voice was recorded and pressed onto records for the actors to use as reference. Myrick would later explain that she "went out there [to Hollywood] fully prepared to argue and to quote authority to them that the Southern people do not talk like Negroes, but the Negroes like Southerners". She also continued to act as a technical consultant during filming, providing insight on how to make the film's production design as authentic as possible. Myrick also re-watched each recorded scene to check for mistakes.

Myrick was against the decision to cast Hattie McDaniel as the character Mammy, as she thought McDaniel didn't have the "dignity, age, [or] nobility" for the role. McDaniel went on to win the Academy Award for Best Supporting Actress for her performance, becoming the first African American to win an Oscar.

Overall Myrick worked on the production for seven months, earning $125/week from January to July 1939. Following the film's release, Myrick gained prominence discussing her work across the country, earning her the title "the Emily Post of the South".

Her first freelance article, "Pardon My Un-Southern Accent: Why Gone with the Wind Won't Jar Southerners", appeared in the December 16, 1939, issue of Collier's, and she wrote an additional article for Southern Living in October 1967 about the experience. When NBC first premiered Gone with the Wind on broadcast television on November 7, 1976, Myrick was a main presenter of an hour-long introductory program broadcast on WSB-TV.

Years after her death, Myrick's coverage of the film's production—a total of 58 columns that she wrote for the Telegraph while in California—was compiled into a 1982 book titled White Columns in Hollywood: Reports from the Gone with the Wind Sets, edited by Richard Barksdale Harwell.

== Conservationism and agriculture ==
Myrick had a passion for agriculture and farming throughout her life. Her work as farm editor for the Telegraph brought her statewide praise and even national recognition. Myrick often promoted the use of blue lupine as a winter forage crop that would prevent erosion, building soil and holding water, and in 1949 a conservationist group in Dooly County named Myrick the "Bloomin' Lupine Queen". In 1950 she wrote a children's book titled Our Daily Bread about environmental conservationism that was used as an official textbook in Georgia, North Carolina, and Tennessee.

In 1956, the Progressive Farmer bestowed upon her their Woman of the Year in Service to Agriculture award, and the National Association of Soil and Water Conservation Districts recognized her work with a special citation in 1963.

Additionally, Myrick was a member of the Macon Chamber of Commerce's livestock and farming committees.

== Personal life and legacy ==
Myrick was close friends with fellow journalist and author Margaret Mitchell, and remained friends with Mitchell's widower John Marsh following her sudden death in 1949; Marsh would die three years later in 1952.

During World War II, she helped organize Red Cross events and salvage campaigns, and she served on the Bibb County War Price and Rations Board.

Myrick was a charter member of the Macon Little Theater in 1934, and was the theater's president from 1947 to 1948. She also appeared in over twenty-five stage productions. Myrick also watercolor painted as a hobby.

Myrick died on September 3, 1978, and was buried at Memory Hill Cemetery in Milledgeville. She never married and had no children.

She was added to the Georgia Press Association's Georgia Newspaper Hall of Fame in 1984.

In 2008, Myrick was inducted into the Georgia Women of Achievement Hall of Fame.

== Bibliography ==
- Myrick, Susan (1950). Our Daily Bread. Danville, Illinois: Interstate Printers & Publishers. OCLC 10089133.
- Myrick, Susan (1967). "All My Friends Have Gone with the Wind", Southern Living, October 1967, 33.
- Myrick, Susan (1982). Harwell, Richard Barksdale (ed.). White Columns in Hollywood: Reports from the Gone with the Wind Sets. Macon: Mercer University Press. ISBN 978-0-86554-044-6. OCLC 8907284.
