= The Griffin Daily News =

Daily American newspaper

Griffin Daily News
- Type: Daily newspaper
- Owner: Paxton Media Group
- Founded: 1871; 155 years ago
- Headquarters: Griffin, Georgia
- Circulation: 6,936
- Website: griffindailynews.com

The Griffin Daily News is a daily paper serving Griffin, Georgia and Spalding County. It is published in print and online. with a circulation of about 7,000.

== History ==
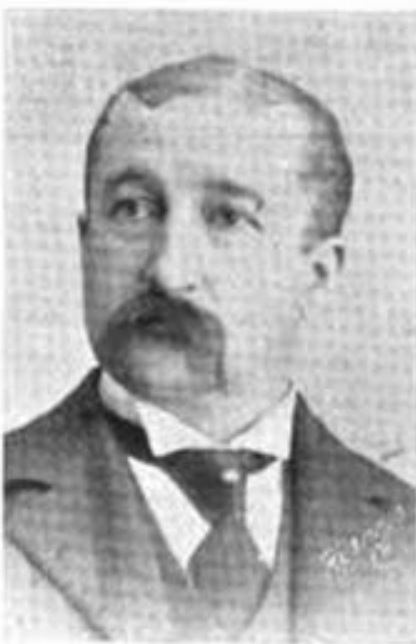
Douglas Glessner, founder and long-time editor of Griffin Daily News and Sun

The Griffin News was founded in 1871 as a daily publishing each weekday except Monday with a weekly on Friday. Douglas Glessner, originally of Delaware, Ohio, was both editor and publisher. After a merger with The Sun in 1889 it was published under the name The Griffin Daily News and Sun until 1925 when it became the Griffin Daily News.

Under Glessner's editorship the paper published racially inflammatory material and took a pro-lynching stance. According to historian Donald G. Matthews, it "pilloried" the Governor for calling for the prosecution of those responsible for lynching Dr. W. L. Ryder, a white man lynched in 1897. The paper is seen by historian Edwin T. Arnold as a provocateur in events surrounding the all-black regiment the "Tenth Immunes", a Buffalo Soldier regiment, as they passed through Griffin, with much of that paper's coverage setting the national tone of coverage for those events. When Sam Hose was lynched and burned alive in a nearby Coweta County, the paper ran the headline "The Hose Will Not Put Out This Fire".

At the time of Glessner's sudden death in 1910 due to neprhitis, the paper was considered one of the "leading Democratic newspapers of middle Georgia."

In 1924 the paper was purchased by Judge C. C. Givens to be run by two of his sons. It was bought the subsequent year by Quimby Melton, a former manager for the Scripps-Howard newspaper chain. It stayed in the Melton family until its sale to Thomson Newspapers in 1982. In the Melton era, the paper's circulation rose from a readership of 6,000 in 1950 to 13,500 in 1980. In 1997 it was bought by the Paxton Media Group.
