= Americus Times-Recorder =

- Type: Weekly newspaper
- Format: Broadsheet
- Owner: Carpenter Media Group
- Publisher: Frank Perea II
- Founded: 1879
- Headquarters: 101 Highway 27 East; Americus, Georgia 31709; United States
- Circulation: 2,953 (as of 2013)
- Website: americustimesrecorder.com

The Americus Times-Recorder is a weekly newspaper published in Americus, Georgia. It is owned by Carpenter Media Group.

== History ==
In 1879, the Americus Recorder began as a tri-weekly publication owned by Merrel Callaway. The Americus Recorder was a competitor of the Sumter Republican newspaper at this time. A few years later, Calloway sold his interest in the Americus Recorder and the Americus Times was then officially established in 1890. While both were successful, the town could not afford to have both the Times and the Recorder, so they combined both of the newspaper titles in 1891 when Captain Bascom Myrick made the name the Americus Times Recorder.

Col. Meyrick became manager and editor of the Americus Times. His wife, Marie Louise Scudder Myrick, is said to be the first woman "in the South" to own and edit a newspaper.

Thomson Newspapers bought the Times-Recorder in 1984; Community Newspaper Holdings, Inc. bought the paper in 2000 when Thomson decided to leave the newspaper business.

In August 2015, CNHI sold the Times-Recorder to Carpenter Newsmedia LLC, since renamed to Carpenter Media Group.
