= Sarah Porter Hillhouse =

- Born: May 29, 1763; Massachusetts
- Died: March 26, 1831 (aged 67)
- Occupations: editor and printer
- Years active: 1803-1811
- Known for: First female editor and printer in Georgia
- Spouse: David Hillhouse (m. 1781)
- Children: 6
- Relatives: Edward Porter Alexander (great-grandson)

Sarah Porter Hillhouse (May 29, 1763—March 26, 1831) was Georgia's, and possibly America's, first woman editor and printer. She has been posthumously inducted into both the Georgia Newspaper Hall of Fame and the Georgia Women of Achievement.

== Life ==
Sarah Porter was born on May 29, 1763, in Massachusetts to General Elisha and Sarah Jewett Porter. On October 7, 1781, she married David Hillhouse, a Yale University graduate who was said to have commanded a regiment at the Battles of Lexington and Concord and who fought at the Battles of Saratoga.

In 1786, Hillhouse joined her husband in settling in the still-undeveloped to Washington, Georgia, from Massachusetts. They moved with David's sister and brother-in-law. David Hillhouse worked a variety of jobs, including setting up a general store, owning land, serving as a local and state official, and contracting troops. He also served as a justice of the peace, judge, and militia officer.

The Hillhouses had six children together, though three died young. Sarah, Mary, and David P. Hillhouse survived into adulthood.

=== Monitor ===
In 1801, Sarah's husband David Hillhouse purchased the town's newspaper, the Washington Gazette, and renamed it the Monitor. When he died just two years later on March 24, 1803, Sarah took over the role as publisher, making her the first woman publisher in Georgia. She immediately took on the management and learned the necessary skills to run the paper, which had a subscription of around 800. Under her management, the Monitor focused on providing up-to-date news and background on public affairs. She also worked as a reporter. Hillhouse engaged in many of the side businesses common for publishers at the time, such as selling writing paper, blank legal forms, and gamuts. She also advertised books being available at her house.

She edited the Monitor, and was acknowledged on the folio line, until 1811 when she passed it to her son, David P. Hillhouse, who sold the newspaper to John K.M. Charlton.

=== Later life ===
In 1814, Hillhouse built her house that is now a historic site in Washington. This house was built on the previous site of the Monitor site, and was one of the first Frame houses in Washington.

Hillhouse's daughter Sarah died as a young adult. After Sarah's husband, Felix Gilbert, died, Hillhouse was named one of her granddaughter, Sarah Gilbert's guardians and "was to enjoy the income of the granddaughter's $20,000 trust fund if it was more than the child needed." Upon her death, most of Hillhouse's estate was left to Mary, as David had received much of the family property during her life, and Sarah Gilbert was well provided for through her trust fund. Hillhouse stipulated that the estate should be done with as Mary wished and that any of Mary's children who contested her management were to be cut off from their share. This stipulation was likely to prevent arguments about the management.

One of Sarah Gilbert's sons was the Confederate general Edward Porter Alexander.
