= John Marlor =

American architect

- Born: February 11, 1789; England
- Died: October 13, 1835 (aged 46); Milledgeville, Georgia
- Occupation: Architect

John Marlor (1789–1835) was an England-born, Charleston, South Carolina-raised master builder whose work in Milledgeville, Baldwin County, Georgia, capital of the state of Georgia from 1804 to 1868, combined several classical style elements to create the American architecture style known as "Milledgeville Federal", characterized by a fanlighted front entrances under two-story double-columned porticoes with cantilevered second story balcony, curved cantilevered staircases, and side-gabled roofs.

== Life and career ==
Born February 11, 1789, in England, little is known about Marlor's early years, but it has been speculated that he was apprenticed to a builder or taught himself from house-builders' plan-books. He moved from Charleston to Milledgeville in 1815, and began a nearly 20-year career that shaped the town's architectural heritage.

Marlor's reinterpretation of prevailing Georgian and Federal structures brought about an early classical revival in central Georgia architecture. The sophistication of his creations is more in keeping with that of an architect than an artisan. As he gained experience, his signature architectural features became increasingly complex, as evidenced in his structures preserved in Milledgeville. When builder Daniel Pratt moved to Milledgeville in 1821, Marlor hired him, beginning a collaboration that later grew to include builder Elam Alexander. Marlor's construction labor was performed primarily by seven enslaved African-Americans, all of whom were trained carpenters. He owned several thousand acres of timber land and a lumber mill, from which he drew for his building materials.

Marlor died on October 13, 1835, in Milledgeville, where he is interred in Memory Hill Cemetery, his tombstone featuring engraved builder's tools. Named to honor his contributions to the city's heritage, Milledgeville's John Marlor Arts Center includes two historic structures, the 1830 John Marlor House, adapted into offices of the Milledgeville-Baldwin County Allied Arts Center and the Elizabeth Marlor Bethune Art Gallery, and the 1911 Allen's Market Building, adapted into theatre, meeting and studio space.

== Architectural legacy in Milledgeville ==
- John Marlor House, built in 1830 as a wedding present for his second wife Ann Carlton, now housing offices and an art gallery as headquarters for a complex of historic structures and an art center.
- Brown-Stetson-Sanford House, built c. 1825 with a Marlor trademark spiral staircase, later converted to a hotel to serve visitors and legislators during the city's years as capital of Georgia and from 1951 to 1966 into a tea room, before being donated to the Old Capital Historical Society who moved it to West Hancock Street in 1966.
- Newell-Watts House, a late Georgian, early Greek Revival home originally owned by the same family for more than 100 years.
- Stovall-Conn-Gardner House, "13 Columns", a two story clapboard structure with Greek Revival elements; the thirteen columns are believed to represent the Thirteen Colonies united during the American Revolution.
- Masonic Temple of Benevolent Lodge No. 3, F. & A. M., the oldest Masonic building in Georgia in continuous usage, dedicated on June 24, 1834; considered by many to be Marlor's best work, with an especially fine cantilevered staircase.
