= J. Williams Thorne =

American abolitionist and North Carolina politician (1816–1897)

Joseph Williams Thorne (December 25, 1816 – May 18, 1897) was an American abolitionist, reformer, participant in the Underground Railroad, and Reconstruction-era politician in North Carolina. Born in Chester County, Pennsylvania, into a Quaker family, Thorne became active in antislavery politics and the Progressive Friends movement. By about 1850, he was assisting people escaping slavery through an Underground Railroad station associated with his farm in Sadsbury Township.

After the American Civil War, Thorne and his family moved to Warren County, North Carolina. He served in the North Carolina House of Representatives, was a delegate to the state's 1875 constitutional convention, and was subsequently elected to the North Carolina Senate. In 1875, the House expelled him during a controversy concerning his religious views and North Carolina's religious qualification for public office. In March 1880, the House voted to expunge the 1875 action from its record.

== Early life and reform activity ==
Thorne was born on December 25, 1816, in Chester County, Pennsylvania, to Joseph Jonathan Thorne and Margaret Williams. He was raised in a Quaker farming family.

As an adult, Thorne became involved in antislavery politics in Chester County and was associated with Liberty Party A contemporary North Carolina legislative biography later identified him as a member of the Society of Progressive Friends at Longwood.

== Underground Railroad activity ==
Thorne participated in the Underground Railroad in Chester County by about 1850. Robert Clemens Smedley's 1883 history of the Underground Railroad in Chester County devoted a section to Thorne's activities. Smedley wrote that after a discussion between Thorne and abolitionist Thomas Whitson concerning direct assistance to people escaping slavery, Thorne began receiving freedom seekers at a station associated with his property.

According to Smedley, people seeking freedom were directed to Thorne by Whitson and other abolitionists, including Lindley Coates, Joshua Brinton, Joseph Moore, Joseph Fulton and James Williams. Thorne arranged for them to be transported at night in a covered wagon to other Underground Railroad stations. Some remained temporarily and worked for him, receiving customary wages. Historian Max Longley likewise describes Thorne's Sadsbury farm as part of the Underground Railroad network and places his participation beginning around 1850.

== Move to North Carolina and political career ==
After the Civil War, Thorne's family relocated from Pennsylvania to Warren County, North Carolina, with family members moving south in stages.

Thorne entered politics during the Reconstruction era. A legislative biographical record published in 1877 stated that he was elected to the North Carolina House in 1874, served as a delegate to the state constitutional convention in 1875, and was subsequently elected to the North Carolina Senate.

== Religious controversy and expulsion ==
While serving in the North Carolina House, Thorne became the subject of a controversy over religious views expressed in a pamphlet he had written. The dispute centered on North Carolina's Constitutional religious qualification for public office.

On February 24, 1875, the House expelled Thorne. A contemporary legislative biography described the expulsion as arising from his religious views and noted that Thorne maintained that he did not deny the existence of God. The proceedings were also published in 1875 under the title The Great Ecclesiastical Trial of J. Williams Thorne, Representative from Warren County.

The expulsion was not the final legislative action on the matter. In March 1880, the North Carolina House voted to expunge the 1875 action from its record.

== Later life and reform work ==
By 1886, Thorne had returned to Pennsylvania. His later interests included temperance, women's suffrage, arbitration, and financial reform.

A contemporary legislative account described Thorne as a frequent writer of prose and verse for newspapers.

== Personal life and death ==
Thorne married Mary J. Pusey in 1846. Their children included Caleb Pusey Thorne, Annie Thorne, and Eugene Thorne.

Thorne died on May 18, 1897. The Progressive Friends subsequently read a momorial resolution in his memory.
