= Arts & Letters =

American literary journal

- Discipline: Literary journal
- Language: English
- Edited by: Martin Lammon

Publication details
- History: Since 1999
- Publisher: Georgia College & State University (United States)
- Frequency: Biannual

Standard abbreviations
- ISO 4: Arts Lett.

Indexing
- ISSN: 1523-4592
- OCLC no.: 40676314

Links
- https://artsandletters.gcsu.edu/

Arts & Letters is an American semiannual literary journal, published by Georgia College & State University in Milledgeville, Georgia. Arts & Letters nominates for the Pushcart Prize, Best New Poets, Best American Short Stories, and Best American Essays.

== History ==
Arts & Letters was established by Martin Lemmon in 1999. He served as editor until 2015. In Spring 2027, the journal will be replaced with a new journal, Peach.

== Featured writers ==
- John Guare
- Tina Howe
- Bobbie Ann Mason
- Charles Simic.
- Bruce Bond
- Denise Duhamel
- Donald Hall
- Bret Lott
- Maxine Kumin
- Sonja Livingston
- Opal Moore
- Bob Hicok
- Xu Xi
- Lia Purpura
- Marianne Boruch
- Keith Wilson
- Jesse Lee Kercheval
- K. E. Allen
- Jacob M. Appel
- Janice Eidus
- Stephen Graham Jones
- Rachel Kadish
- Evan Lavender-Smith
- Julianna Baggot
- James Doyle
- Patricia Foster
- Nola Garrett
- Ira Sukrungruang
- Kirk M. Wright

== Masthead ==
As of April 2025, the staff included:

- Editor – Laura Newbern
- Fiction Editor – Chika Unigwe
- Nonfiction Editor – Peter Selgin
- Poetry Editor – Kerry James Evans

== See also ==
- List of literary magazines
- List of United States magazines
