= Kerry James =

Kerry James may refer to:

- Kery James (born 1977), French rapper
- Kerry James Evans (born 1983), American poet
- Kerry James Marshall (born 1955), American artist
- Kerry James (actor) (born 1986), Canadian actor and producer
