= Irreplaceable (disambiguation) =

"Irreplaceable" is a 2006 song by Beyoncé.

Irreplaceable may also refer to:

== Music ==
- Irreplaceable (album), by George Benson, or the title song, 2003
- Irreplaceable (EP) or the title song, by S.H.E, 2016
- "Irreplaceable", a song by Kerri Ann, 1998
- "Irreplaceable", a track by Vinnie Paul from the Hellyeah album Welcome Home, 2019

== Other media ==
- Irreplaceable (film), a 2016 French film
- "Irreplaceable" (The Replacements), a television episode
- Irreplaceable, a 2009 novel by Stephen Lovely
