= Dana Award =

Literary award

The Dana Award is a literary award presented in short fiction, poetry and novels. It was founded in 1996 by literature professor and poet Mary Elizabeth Parker with the financial backing of Michael Dana. The competition is based in Greensboro, North Carolina. The judges for the competition include Scottish novelist Margot Livesey.

Notable recipients include Michael Pritchett, Danielle Trussoni, Tina Chang, and Stephen Lovely.

== Past winners ==
=== Novel ===
- 1996 – Ellen B. Coggeshall for The Rabies Tree
- 1997 – Jennifer Natalya Fink for The Mikveh Queen
- 1998 – Owen Goodwyne
- 1999 – Joette Hayashigawa
- 2000 – Michael Pritchett for The Final Effort of the Archer
- 2001 – Danielle Trussoni for Tunnel Rat
- 2002 – BK Loren for Thicker Than Water
- 2003 – Tatjana Soli for The Lotus Eaters
- 2004 – Stephen Lovely for Irreplaceable
- 2005 – Paul Graham for A Trained Voice
- 2006 – Harvey Grossinger for The Caretaker’s Niece
- 2007 – Thad Nodine for Going Home
- 2008 – Rebecca Berg for Julio's Ghost
- 2009 – Tippets Jensen for The Good Deed
- 2010 – Patrick E. Horrigan for Portraits at an Exhibition
- 2011 – Sean Murphy for Wilson's Way
- 2012 – Scott Lambridis for The Many Raymond Days
- 2013 – N.S. Keonings for Goatsong
- 2014 – Boman Desai for The Elephant Graveyard
- 2015 – Nancy Swan for Escalante Moon
- 2016 – Misha Rai for Blood We Did Not Spill

=== Short fiction ===
- 1999 – Jacob M. Appel
- 2000 – Robert C. Goodwin
- 2001 – Laren Stover
- 2003 – Alma Garcia
- 2004 – Glori Simmons
- 2005 – Catherine Gentile
- 2006 – Paula W. Peterson
- 2007 – Deanne Lundin
- 2008 – Patricia Brieschke
- 2009 – Matthew Pitt
- 2010 – Nicole Louise Reid
- 2011 – Rebecca Givens Rolland
- 2012 – Paul Hastings Wilson
- 2013 – Skye Anicca
- 2014 – BD Feil
- 2015 – Brenda Peynado
- 2016 – Allison Alsup

=== Poetry ===
- 1996 – Tina Chang
- 1997 – Sandra Stone
- 1999 – Catherine M. Stearns
- 2000 – K.E. Allen
- 2001 – Ronald G. Wardall
- 2002 – Laura-Gray Street
- 2003 – Simeon Berry
- 2004 – Evan Oakley
- 2005 – Sam Witt
- 2006 – Camille Dungy
- 2007 – Sandra Stone
- 2008 – Allen Braden
- 2009 – Jeanne Marie Beaumont
- 2010 – Julie Weber
- 2011 – Jeannie Gambill
- 2012 – Tom Daley
- 2013 – Brandi George
- 2014 – John Blair
- 2015 – Rachel Dilworth
- 2016 – Mark Wagenaar

=== Essay ===
- 2011 – Peter Selgin

== See also ==
- List of literary awards
