= Georgia College & State University =

Public liberal arts university in Milledgeville, Georgia, U.S.

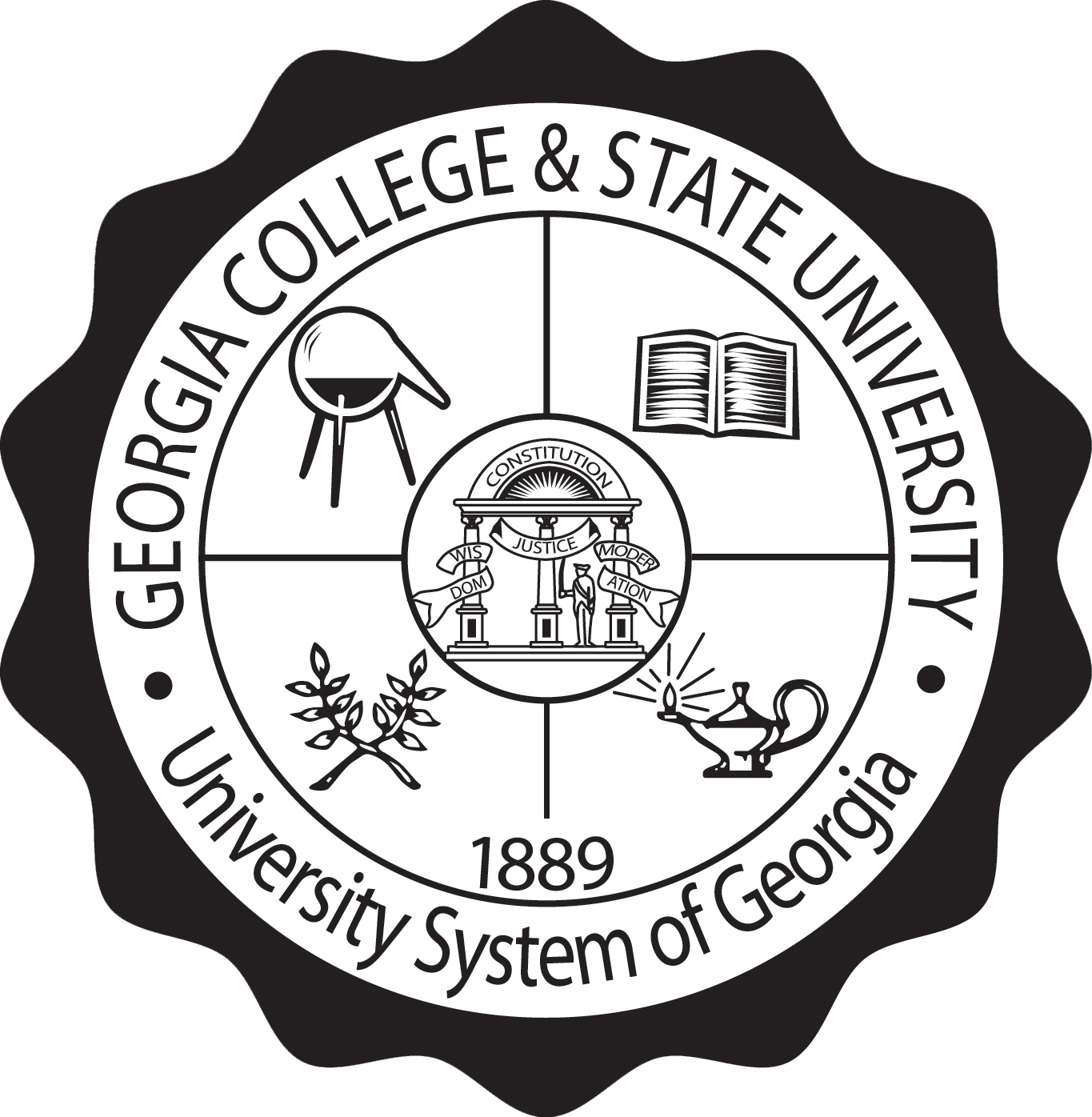
- Former names: Georgia Normal and Industrial College (1889–1922); Georgia State College for Women (1922–1961); Woman's College of Georgia (1961–1967); Georgia College at Milledgeville (1967–1971); Georgia College (1971–1996)
- Type: Public liberal arts university
- Established: 1889
- Parent institution: University System of Georgia
- Affiliations: NCAA Division II – Peach Belt Conference
- Endowment: $45.5 million (end of FY 2019)
- President: Cathy Cox
- Administrative staff: 606 (2019)
- Students: 6,873
- Undergraduates: 5,605
- Postgraduates: 1,268
- Location: Milledgeville, Georgia, U.S. 33°04′53″N 83°13′50″W
- Colors: Blue and green
- Nickname: Bobcats
- Mascot: Thunder the Bobcat
- Website: gcsu.edu

Georgia College and State University (Georgia College or GCSU) is a public liberal arts university institution located in Milledgeville, Georgia, United States. Serving a student body of roughly 7,300, the university operates as a member of both the University System of Georgia and the Council of Public Liberal Arts Colleges. The school officially received its designation as the state's "Public Liberal Arts University" from the Georgia Board of Regents in 1996.

== History ==
Georgia College was established after lobbying from women's education advocates such as Rebecca Latimer Felton, Julia Flisch, and Susan Cobb Milton Atkinson. In support of their petitions, Susan's husband, William Y. Atkinson, sponsored legislation for the founding of a state women's college. Georgia College was chartered on November 8, 1889 as Georgia Normal and Industrial College. Julia Flisch spoke at the cornerstone ceremony on November 27, 1890. The school did not formally open until September 30, 1891. Georgia College's emphasis at the time was largely vocational, and its major task was to prepare young women for teaching or industrial careers. In 1917, in keeping with economic and cultural changes in the state, Georgia Normal and Industrial College was authorized to grant 4-year degrees, the first of which was awarded in 1921. In 1922, the institution's name was changed to Georgia State College for Women.

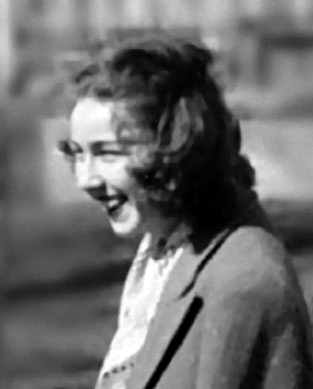
Flannery O'Connor, a famous alumna in the 1940s

The university has been a unit of the University System of Georgia since the system's founding in 1932. Mary "Flannery" O'Connor entered as a freshman in 1942. Active in student publications, she graduated three years later with a degree in social science and became one of the South's most noted writers. Some of her early short stories were published during this time, and her story, "A Late Encounter with the Enemy" is loosely based on an occurrence near campus. Also during World War II, Georgia State College for Women served as one of four colleges that trained WAVES for the U.S. Navy. Some of O'Connor's comics from this period depict the WAVES. After the war, enrollment declined as women preferred co-educational colleges.

The name was changed to Woman's College of Georgia in 1961, and, when the institution became coeducational in 1967, it became Georgia College at Milledgeville. The name was shortened to Georgia College in 1971. In August 1996, the Board of Regents approved a change of name to Georgia College and State University, and a new mission as Georgia's Public Liberal Arts University.

== Presidents ==
- J. Harris Chappell (1891 to 1905)
- Marvin McTyeire Parks (1905 to 1927)
- Jasper Luther Beeson (1927 to 1934)
- Guy Herbert Wells (1934 to 1953)
- Henry King Stanford (1953 to 1956)
- Robert Edmund Lee, or "Buzz" (1956 to 1967)
- J. Whitney Bunting (1968 to 1981)
- Edwin G. Speir, Jr. (1981 to 1996)
- Ralph W. Hemphill (as acting president) (January 1997 to July 1997)
- Rosemary DePaolo (August 1997 to June 2003)
- David G. Brown (interim president) (July 2003 to December 2003)
- Dorothy Leland (January 2004 to 2011)
- Stas Preczewski (interim president) (July 2011 to July 2012)
- Paul Jones (interim president) (July 2012 to August 31, 2012)
- Steven Dorman (September 2012 to 2021)
- Cathy Cox (October 2021 to present)

== Campus ==
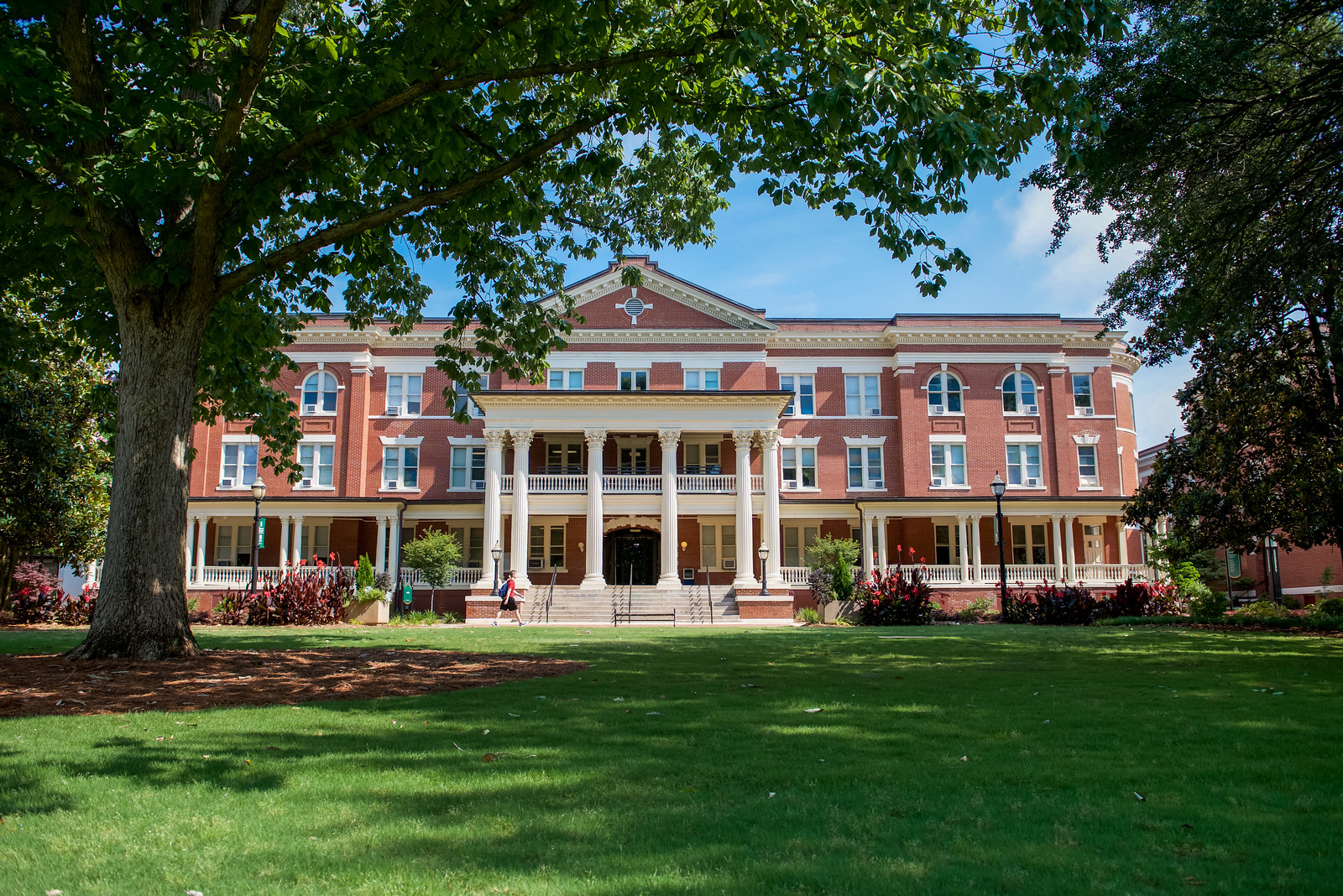
Part of Central Campus (Terrell Hall)

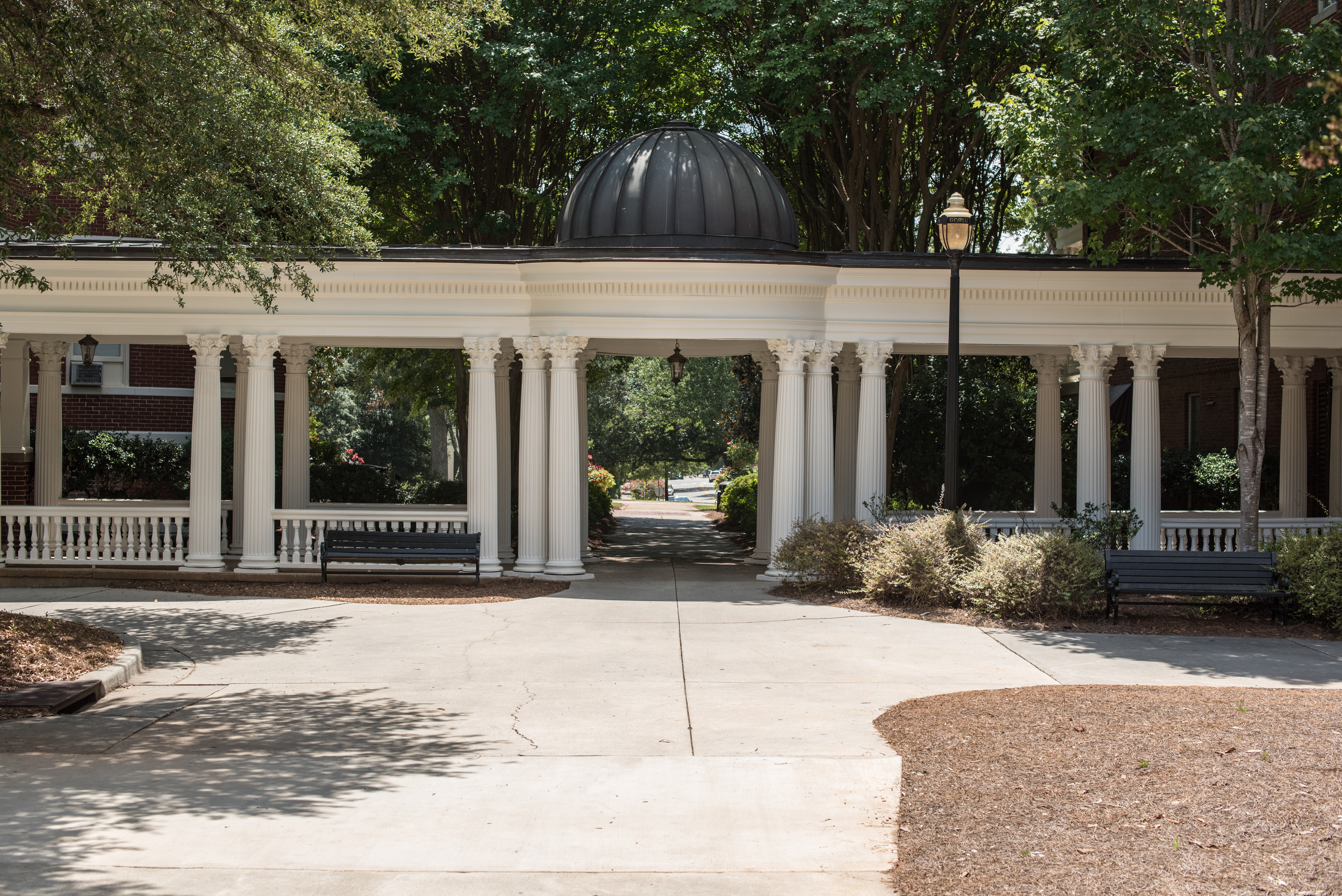
Pergola featured in GCSU branding

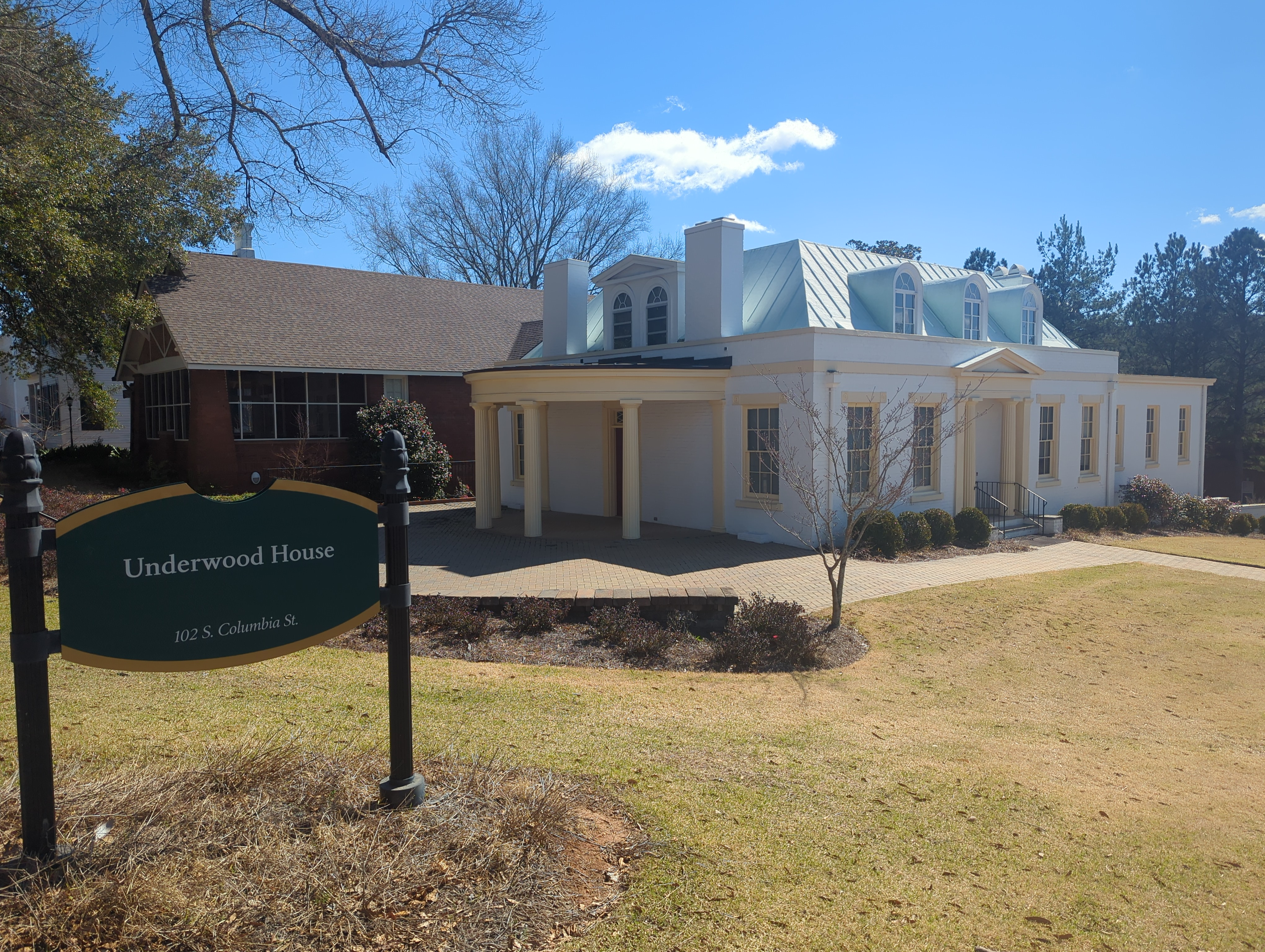
Many local residences have been converted to offices (Underwood House)

The campus is divided into four parts: Central Campus, South Campus, West Campus, and East Campus. Central Campus was built on the remains of Penitentiary Square across from the Governor's Mansion. The Governor's Mansion served as the first dormitory. The Main Building burned down in 1924. In the 1930s, Baldwin County Jail was adjacent to campus.

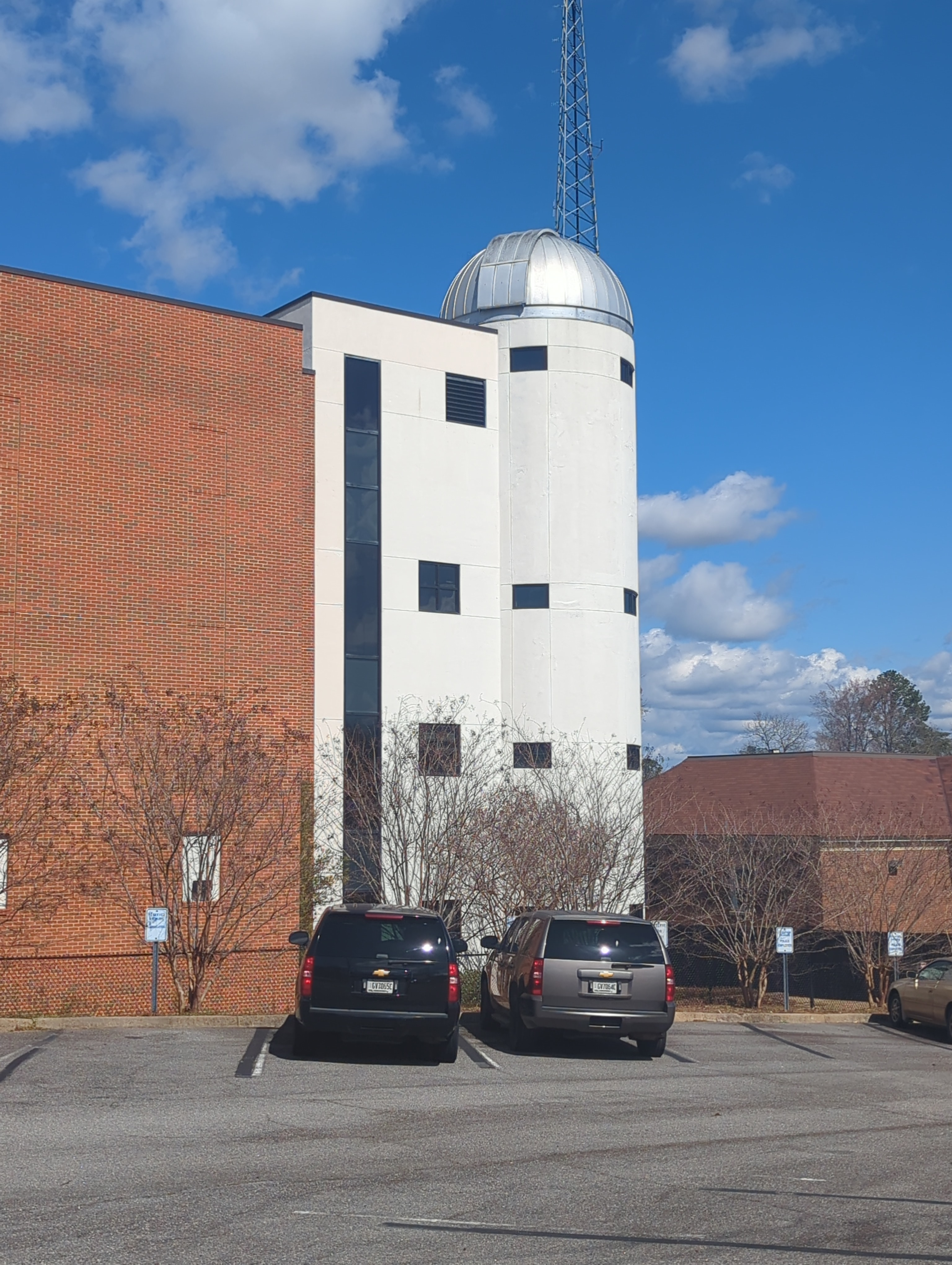
Observatory (Herty Hall)

Presently, Central Campus comprises about 43.2 acres (17.5 ha) in the center of Milledgeville, near the grounds of the former state capitol (now Georgia Military College). The campus contains red brick buildings and white Corinthian columns, representative of those constructed during the pre-Civil War Antebellum period, when Milledgeville was the capital of Georgia. Bell Hall and Russell Auditorium are credited to architect J. Reginald MacEachron. Atkinson Hall (1896), originally a dormitory, is listed on the National Register of Historic Places and now serves as the home of the College of Business. The campus included the "Peabody Model School" (named after the George Peabody College, now part of Vanderbilt University). Other historic buildings on the campus include Sanford Hall (1938), Russell Auditorium (1926), Ina Dillard Russell Art Museum (the original section of the library) (1932), Chappell Hall (1963) (on the site of an earlier Chappell Hall built in 1907), Parks Hall (1911), Terrell Hall (1908), Maxwell Student Union (1972), Beeson Hall (1937), Porter Hall (1939), Lanier Hall (1926), Ennis Hall (1920), and Herty Hall (1954 and expanded in 1972).

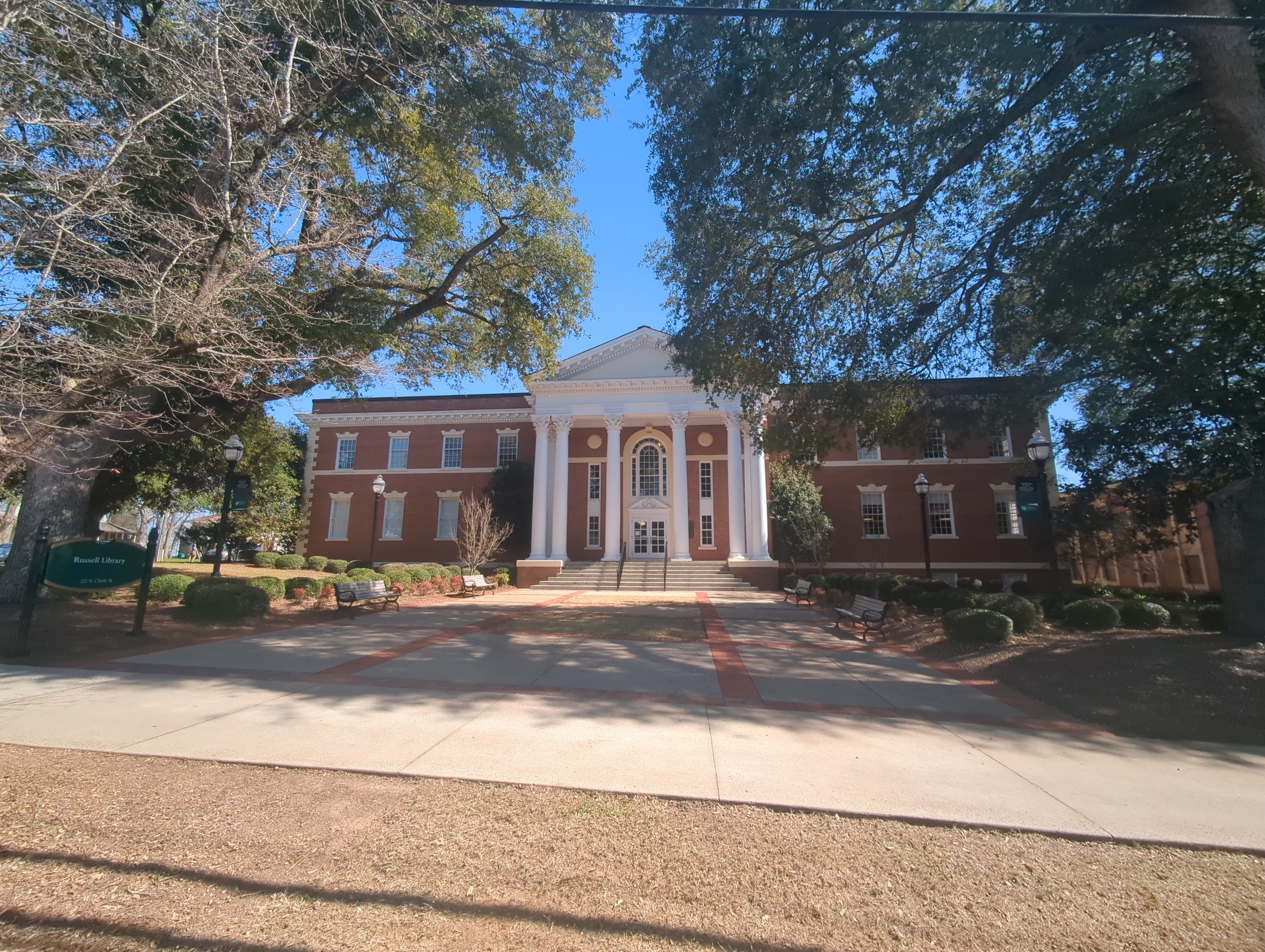
Ina Dillard Russell Library

Ina Dillard Russell Library houses the manuscript collection of author Flannery O'Connor, an alumna of the university, and of U.S. Senator Paul Coverdell, whose career included serving as director of the Peace Corps when the Berlin Wall fell.

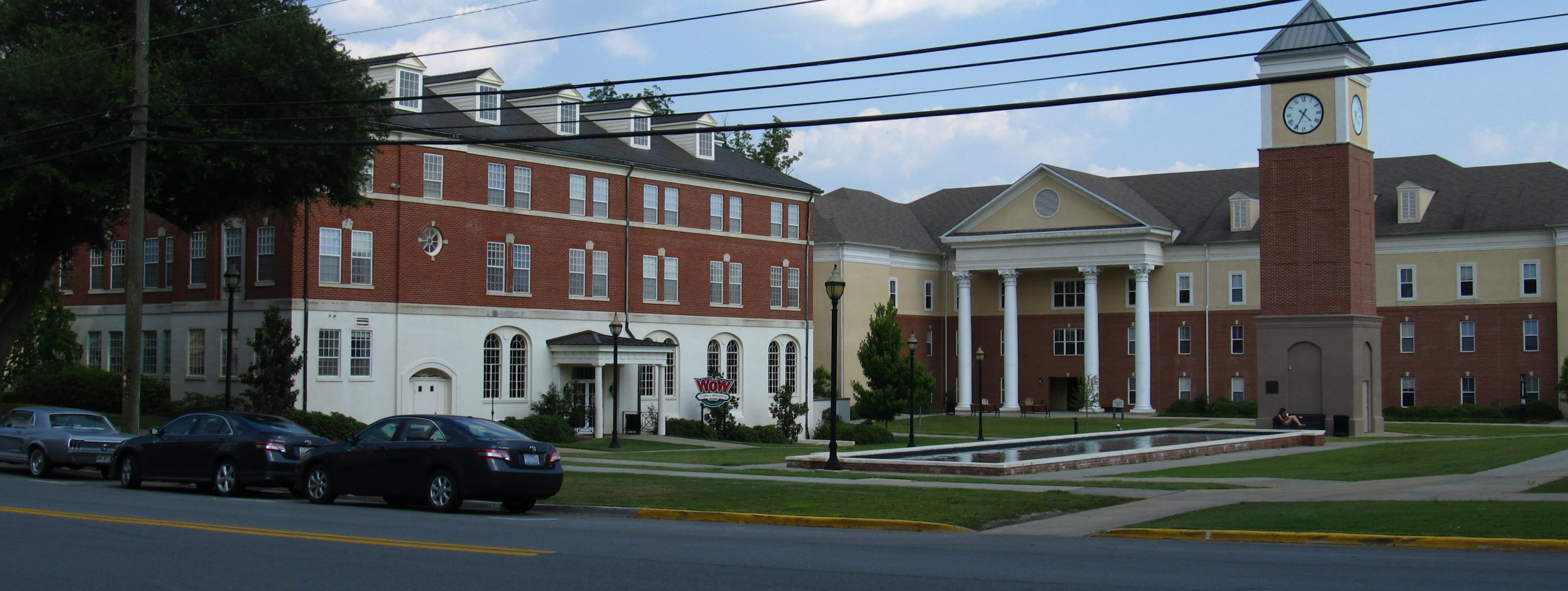
Part of South Campus (Sanford and Napier Halls)

Most of the university's residence halls are located on South Campus by the main sports complex, called the Centennial Center. The Old Governor's Mansion is also within walking distance of the residence halls and front campus.

West Campus, a 500-acre (200 ha) extension two miles (3.2 km) from Central Campus, contains The Village student apartments and athletic fields.

East Campus is a large recreational area on Lake Laurel (approximately 5 minutes from Central Campus) which is used by students in the university's Environmental Science and Outdoor Education programs.

The Center for Innovation at Georgia College and State University opened in 2022.

== Academics ==
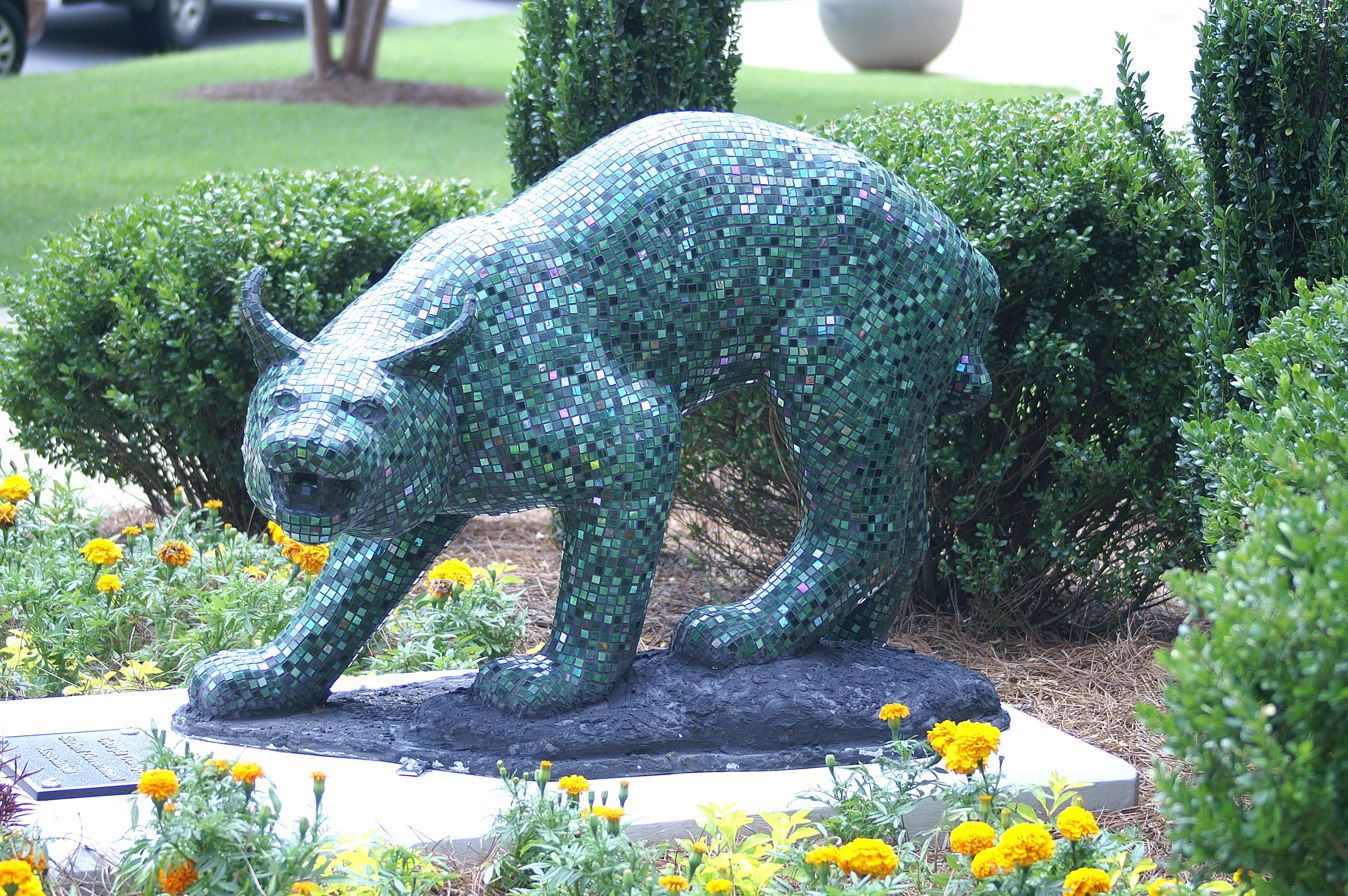
Bobcat Mascot Statue

Students pursue majors and graduate degree programs throughout the university's four colleges: College of Arts & Sciences, J. Whitney Bunting College of Business and Technology, John H. Lounsbury College of Education, and College of Health Sciences.

=== Rankings ===
In 2025, U.S. News & World Report ranked the university tied for No.15 out of 135 Regional Universities South, tied for No.6 in Top Public Schools, No.5 in Best Undergraduate Teaching, and tied for No.4 in Most Innovative Schools.

=== Admissions ===
For students accepted and enrolled in the Fall 2024, the average GPA was 3.70, the average SAT score was 1193, and the average ACT score was 26.

== Athletics ==
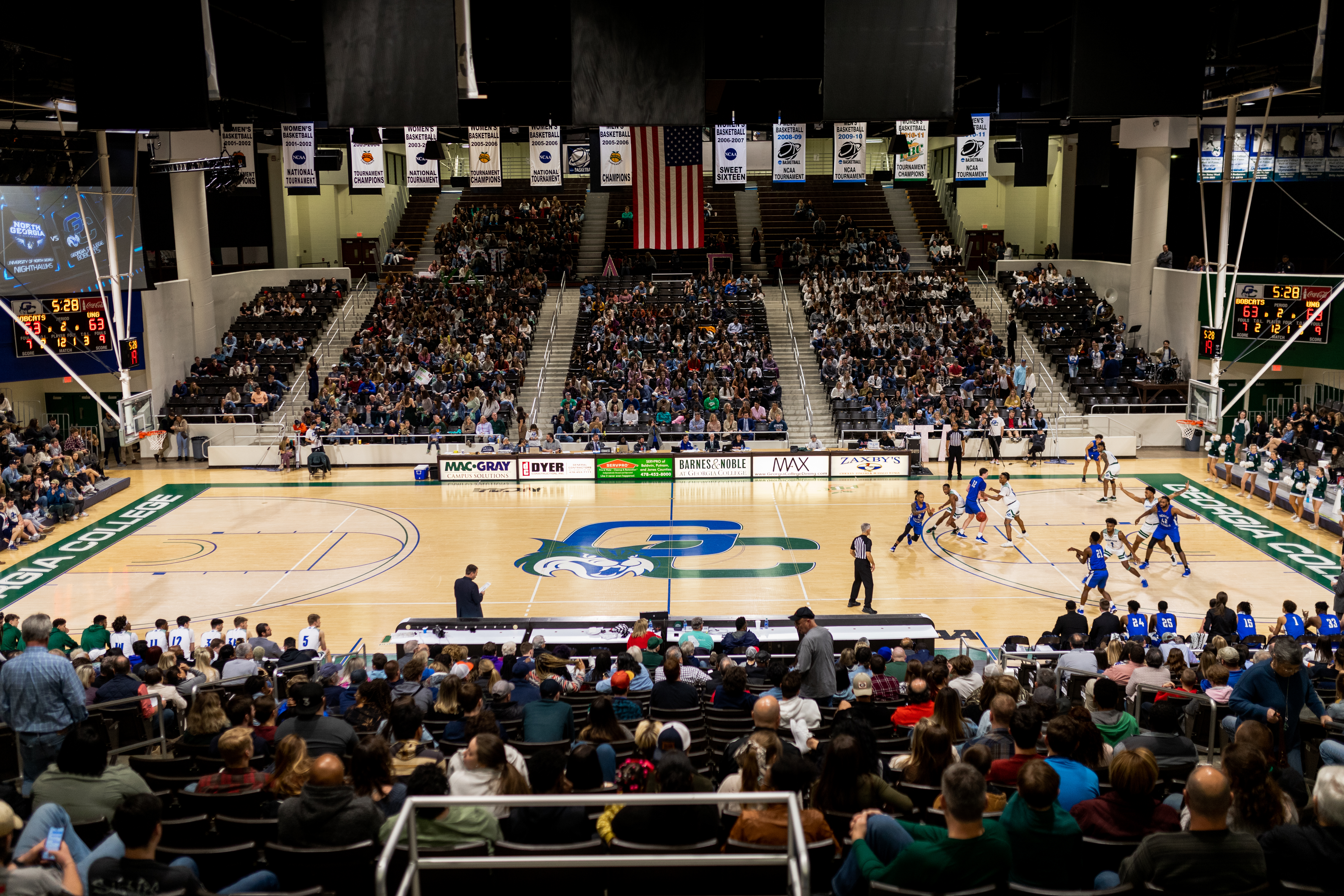
2020 Homecoming Game in Centennial Center

The university's teams are known as the Georgia College Bobcats. The university is currently a member of the National Collegiate Athletic Association (NCAA) Division II and the Peach Belt Conference. Georgia College sponsors varsity teams in baseball, men's and women's basketball, men's and women's cheerleading, men's and women's cross country, golf, dance team, women's soccer, softball, men's and women's tennis, women's volleyball, men's and women's eSports and collegiate bass fishing.

== Student life ==
Undergraduate demographics as of Fall 2023
Race and ethnicity	Total
White	82%
Hispanic	7%
Black	3%
Two or more races	3%
Asian	2%
Unknown	2%
International student	1%
Economic diversity
Low-income (Note: The percentage of students who received an income-based federal Pell grant intended for low-income students.)	17%
Affluent (Note: The percentage of students who are a part of the American middle class at the bare minimum.)	83%

=== Student housing ===
Georgia College and State University (GSCU) provides comprehensive on-campus housing options. Students can choose between traditional suite-style residence halls located on Central Campus or fully equipped, apartment-style living at The Village on West Campus.

=== Greek life ===
GCSU has 20 fraternities and sororities. They are governed by three leadership councils and have over 2,100 students.

=== Student Government Association ===
Georgia College's Student Government Association (SGA) serves the campus community by addressing student concerns, promoting understanding within the college community, and administering all matters which are delegated to the student government by the university president. The responsibility for the governing of the student body is vested in the students themselves. All students are members of the SGA upon their enrollment, and officers and senators are elected on a yearly basis.

== Notable alumni ==
=== Arts and letters ===
- Flannery O'Connor, writer and essayist
- Sherrilyn Kenyon, author
- Jackson Pearce, author (attended)
- Victoria Kennefick, poet (attended)
- Margaret Anne Barnes, author and journalist
- Rachael Kirkconnell, television personality
- Tanvi Ganesh Lonkar, actress
- Andy Offutt Irwin, storyteller and singer
- Brantly Gilbert, singer

=== Education ===
- Gertrude Ehrlich, mathematician
- Helen Matthews Lewis, sociologist, historian, and activist
- Bernice Brown McCullar, writer, academic, and educator
- Susan Dowdell Myrick, journalist, educator, author, and conservationist
- Colette Pierce Burnette, first female president of Huston-Tillotson University

=== Politics and Business ===
- Ruth Carter Stapleton, Christian evangelist and sister of former U.S. president Jimmy Carter
- Sandra Deal, literacy advocate and First Lady of Georgia
- Allison Hooker, Under Secretary of State for Political Affairs
- Brenda Stanley, Oklahoma senator
- Tangie Herring, Georgia state representative
- Robbin Shipp, attorney and former Georgia state representative
- Wilfred Dukes, Georgia state representative
- Mack Jackson, Georgia state representative
- Robert Dickey, Georgia state representative
- Dicksie Bradley Bandy, entrepreneur and historian
- Tony Nicely, former CEO of GEICO

=== Sports ===
- Julius Joseph, basketball player
- Michael Antonini, baseball pitcher (attended)

== Notable faculty ==
- Bernice Brown McCullar, writer
- Julia Flisch, writer, women's rights advocate
- William Ivy Hair, historian
- Peter Selgin, writer
- Chika Unigwe, writer
- Kerry James Evans, poet

== See also ==
- Arts & Letters
- List of colleges and universities in Georgia (U.S. state)
