= Wardall =

Wardall is a surname. Notable people with the surname include:

- John Wardall
- Ronald G. Wardall (1937–2006), American poet
- Thomas Wardall (1862–1932), English cricketer
