= K.E. Allen =

American poet

K. E. Allen
- Other name: Kelly Allen
- Education: Seattle University; University of Michigan
- Occupation: Poet
- Awards: National Chapbook Fellowship; 2004 Woman in a Boat

K. E. Allen is an American poet.

== Life ==
K.E. Allen (Kelly Allen) received her B.A. in English from Seattle University and M.F.A. in Creative Writing from the University of Michigan.

Her work has appeared in Arts & Letters, Center, Kenyon Review, LIT, Lynx, Poetry Daily, Rivendell, Spinning Jenny, Sycamore Review, Verse.

She teaches at the University of Michigan. She lives in Chelsea, Michigan. She is married, with a daughter, Nora Medbh Gillard.

== Awards ==
- Academy of American Poets Prize
- Hopwood Major Prize in Poetry
- Meijer Award
- 2000 Dana Award
- 2004 Poetry Society of America National Chapbook Fellowship

== Works ==
- Woman in a Boat. Poetry Society of America. 2004.

== Reviews ==
- Keith Taylor, "Belief is Perception", Ann Arbor Observer, April 2005.
