= Mary Elizabeth Parker =

American poet

- Born: Schenectady, New York, U.S.
- Education: University of North Carolina at Greensboro (MFA, PhD)
- Occupation: Poet

Mary Elizabeth Parker (b. Schenectady, New York) is an American poet. She is best known for her collection, The Sex Girl (Urthona Press), which won the Urthona Poetry Prize in 1999. Her poetry has been widely anthologized in such journals as Gettysburg Review, New Letters, Arts & Letters, Greensboro Review, Madison Review and Confrontation. Her poetry and essays have previously been nominated for the Pushcart Prize.

Parker is also the founder of the Dana Awards in fiction and poetry.

She holds an MFA in creative writing and a Ph.D. in literature from the University of North Carolina, Greensboro.

== Chapbooks ==
- That Stumbling Ritual (Coraddi Press, University of North Carolina-Greensboro, 1980)
- Breathing in a Foreign Country (winner of the 1993 Kinloch Rivers Memorial Competition)
- Cave-Girl (Finishing Line Press, 2013)
- Miss Havisham in Winter (FutureCycle Press, 2013)
- This Lovely Body (Finishing Line Press, 2016)
