= Evan Oakley =

American poet

Evan Benjamin Oakley is an American poet.

== Life ==
He graduated from George Mason University with an MFA, the University of Northern Colorado, and Colorado State University.

He teaches at Aims College in Greeley, Colorado.

His work has appeared in Ploughshares,

== Awards ==
- Colorado Council on the Arts Poetry Award (1997)
- Dana Award for 2004.

== Works ==
- Noumenon: poems. George Mason University. 1992.

=== Anthologies ===
- Gary Wockner; Gregory McNamee; SueEllen Campbell, eds. (2005). "Invocation to Return the Wolf". Comeback Wolves: Western Writers Welcome the Wolf Home. Big Earth Publishing. ISBN 978-1-55566-365-0.
- Gary Wockner; Laura Pritchett, eds. (2006). "Memoir". Pulse of the River: Colorado Writers Speak for the Endangered Cache La Poudre. Big Earth Publishing. ISBN 978-1-55566-392-6.
