= Colette Pierce Burnette =

American university and museum president

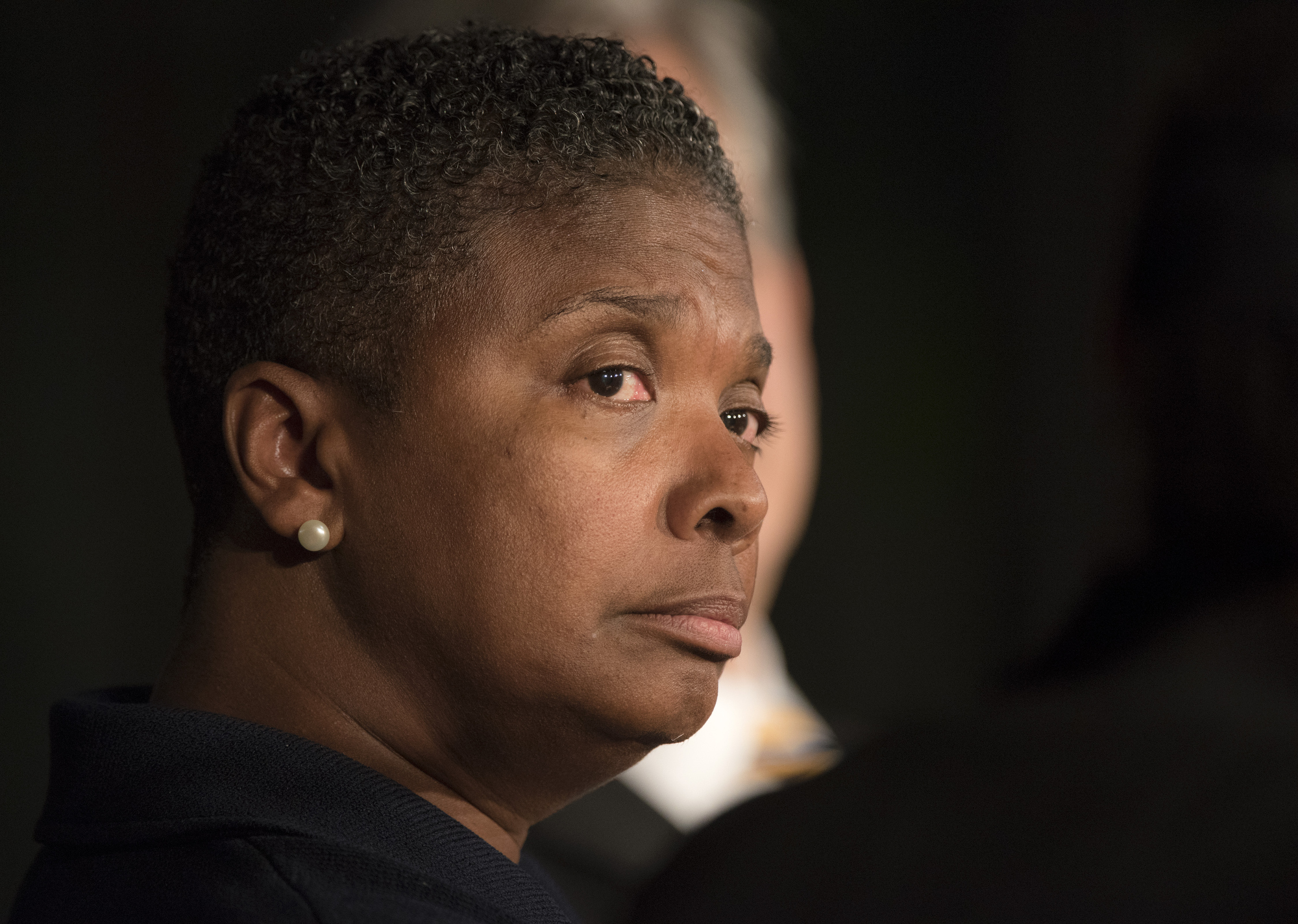
- Born: 1957; Cleveland
- Alma mater: John F. Kennedy High School; Ohio State University; Georgia College & State University; University of Pennsylvania; Harvard Graduate School of Education
- Occupation: University president, industrial engineer

Colette Pierce Burnette (born 1957) is an American educational administrator. Educated as an industrial engineer, Burnette later became interested in supporting students at historically black colleges and universities (HBCUs). After serving in several administrative positions at U.S. universities, she became the first female president of Huston–Tillotson University in 2015. In August 2022, Burnette was announced as the next president and CEO of Newfields in Indianapolis, Indiana. Only 15 months later, she left the position. In March 2025, Burnette was named CEO of Waterloo Greenway.

== Early life and education ==
Colette Pierce was born in 1957 in Cleveland, Ohio. Her father moved north from Mississippi during the Great Migration and had a sixth grade education, her mother finished high school and was a Cleveland native; both placed a high value on education. She grew up in the inner city of Cleveland and attended a Black public school, John F. Kennedy High School.

A first-generation student, visiting Ohio State University convinced Burnette to study industrial engineering there, and she was supported by the College of Engineering's Minority Engineering Program. After graduating from Ohio State with a Bachelor of Science in engineering in 1980, she worked in several corporate and government jobs, including as a computer analyst at The Washington Post, an operations support engineer at Procter & Gamble, and in project management services at the Washington State Department of Transportation.

Burnette was inspired by visits to her husband's alma mater, Morehouse College, to switch careers and focus on developing the mission of HBCUs. She earned a Master of Science in administration from Georgia College. Burnette went on to earn a Ed.D. in higher education administration from the University of Pennsylvania in 2015 and also graduated from the management development program at the Harvard Graduate School of Education.

== Career ==
Burnette spent 12 years working for Central State University in Wilberforce, Ohio, working in multiple administrative roles from 1999 to 2012. From 2012 to 2013, she served as the interim president at Pierce College in Puyallup, Washington.

Burnette was announced as the new president and CEO of Huston–Tillotson University in 2015, becoming the first female president of the university since the merger of Tillotson College and Samuel Huston College. During her tenure, the university increased its endowment by over 55% and introduced several new programs of study, including programs in environmental justice and STEM fields. She announced her intention to retire from her role as president in June 2022.

In 2021, the Austin Chamber of Commerce named Burnette the Austinite of the Year. She was recognized for her work to strengthen Huston–Tillotson University and her service as co-chair for the Mayor's Task Force on Institutional Racism and Systemic Inequities.

Burnette became the president of Newfields, the Indianapolis-based art campus that contains the Indianapolis Museum of Art, on August 1, 2022. She left the position fifteen months later, on November 10, 2023.

== Personal life ==
Burnette met her husband, retired Air Force Lt. Col. Daarel Burnette, in the 1980s; the family moved frequently within the U.S. as a result of his active military service. They have two children, Daarel Burnette II and Daana Burnette.
