= Harvey Grossinger =

American writer

Harvey Grossinger is an American short story writer and novelist.

== Early life and education ==
Harvey Grossinger holds a Bachelor of Arts in English from New York University, a Master of Arts from Indiana University, and a Master of Fine Arts from American University.

== Career ==
Grossinger teaches at American University, and the University of Maryland, College Park. He is a member of the National Book Critics Circle.

His work has appeared in New England Review, Mid-American Review, Western Humanities Review, Cimarron Review, and many other literary journals.

== Awards ==
- 1997: Flannery O'Connor Award for Short Fiction, for The Quarry
- 1997/8?: Edward Lewis Wallant Award, for The Quarry
- Chicago Tribune's Nelson Algren Award
- 2006: Dana Award

== Works ==
- The quarry: stories. University of Georgia Press. 1997. ISBN 978-0-8203-1896-7. "Harvey Grossinger."
- Home burial: five stories. American University. 1990.
