= Michael Pritchett =

American novelist

Michael Pritchett is an American author best known for his novel The Melancholy Fate of Capt. Lewis. Pritchett teaches at the University of Missouri in Kansas City. He is a graduate of the University of Missouri and holds a Masters of Fine Arts in creative writing from Warren Wilson College. He won a Dana Award in 2000.

His fiction has been anthologized in well-known journals, including Passages North, Natural Bridge and New Letters.

== Published works ==
- Pritchett, Michael (2007). The Melancholy Fate of Captain Lewis. Unbridled Books. pp. 416. ISBN 978-1-932961-41-6.
