= Ann Fisher-Wirth =

American poet (born 1947)

13th President of the Association for the Study of Literature and Environment
- In office 2006
- Preceded by: Allison Wallace
- Succeeded by: Karla Armbruster

Personal details
- Born: Ann Carolyn Welpton; 25 January 1947 (age 79) Washington, D.C., United States
- Spouse: Peter Wirth
- Children: Jessica Fisher, Lucas Fisher
- Education: M.A., PhD
- Alma mater: Claremont Graduate University
- Profession: Academician, poet
- Awards: Elsie M. Hood Award
- Website: https://annfisherwirth.com/

Ann Fisher-Wirth (born 25 January 1947) is an American poet and scholar, based at the University of Mississippi. She has won several teaching awards, including Liberal Arts Outstanding Teacher of the Year (2006), Humanities Teacher of the Year (2007), and the Elsie M. Hood Award (2014). Her poetry has received numerous awards, including several Pushcart nominations and a Pushcart Special Mention.

== Early life ==
Fisher-Wirth is the daughter of a career Army officer and an English teacher. She was born in Washington, D. C., and lived as a child in Germany, Pennsylvania, and Japan before her father retired from the Army and her parents decided to move to Berkeley, California.

== Education ==
She earned a B.A. degree, magna cum laude, in English from Pomona College in 1968; an M.A. degree in English and American literature from Claremont Graduate School in 1972; and a Ph.D. in English and American literature from Claremont Graduate School in 1981.

== Career ==
She has served as President of the international Association for the Study of Literature and Environment (ASLE), has had a senior Fulbright to the University of Fribourg, Switzerland, and has held the Fulbright Distinguished Chair at Uppsala University, Sweden. She has been teaching at the University of Mississippi since 1988.

== Works ==
Her scholarly work has concentrated primarily on William Carlos Williams and Willa Cather, but she has published on other writers including Cormac McCarthy, Louise Gluck, Robert Hass, and Anita Brookner.

== Selected works ==
- The Bones of Winter Birds, Terrapin Press (2019)
- Mississippi, poems by Ann Fisher-Wirth and photographs by Maude Schuyler Clay, Wings Press (2018)
- First, earth, The Chapbook (2015)
- The Ecopoetry Anthology, coedited with Laura-Gray Street, Trinity University Press (2013)
- Dream Cabinet, Wings Press (2012)
- Carta Marina, Wings Press (2009)
- Slide Shows, Finishing Line Press (2009)
- Five Terraces, Wind Publications (2005)
- Walking Wu-Wei's Scroll, Drunken Boat (2005)
- Blue Window, Archer Books (2003)
- The Trinket Poems, Wind Publications (2003)
- William Carlos Williams and Autobiography: The Woods of His Own Nature, Penn State University Press (1989)

== Selected honors and awards ==
- The Elsie M. Hood Outstanding Teaching Award, University of Mississippi (2014)
- Finalist, Poet Laureate of Mississippi (2012)
- University of Mississippi Humanities Teacher of the Year (2007)
- University of Mississippi Liberal Arts Outstanding Teacher of the Year (2006)
- President, Association for the Study of Literature and Environment (2006)
- Literary Artist Fellowship for poetry from the Mississippi Arts Commission (2005)
- Writing Residency, Djerassi Resident Artists Program in Woodside, Calif. (2005)
- Mississippi Institute of Arts and Letters Poetry Award (2004)
- Rita Dove Poetry Award from the Salem College Center for Women Writers (2004)
- Malahat Review Long Poem Prize (2003)
- Fulbright Distinguished Chair of American Studies, Uppsala University, Sweden (2003)
- Literary Artist Fellowship for poetry from the Mississippi Arts Commission (1998)
- Fulbright Lecturer in American Literature, University of Fribourg, Switzerland (1994)

== Personal life ==
She is married to Peter Wirth. Her daughter, Jessica Fisher, is also a poet.
