= Jennifer Natalya Fink =

American novelist

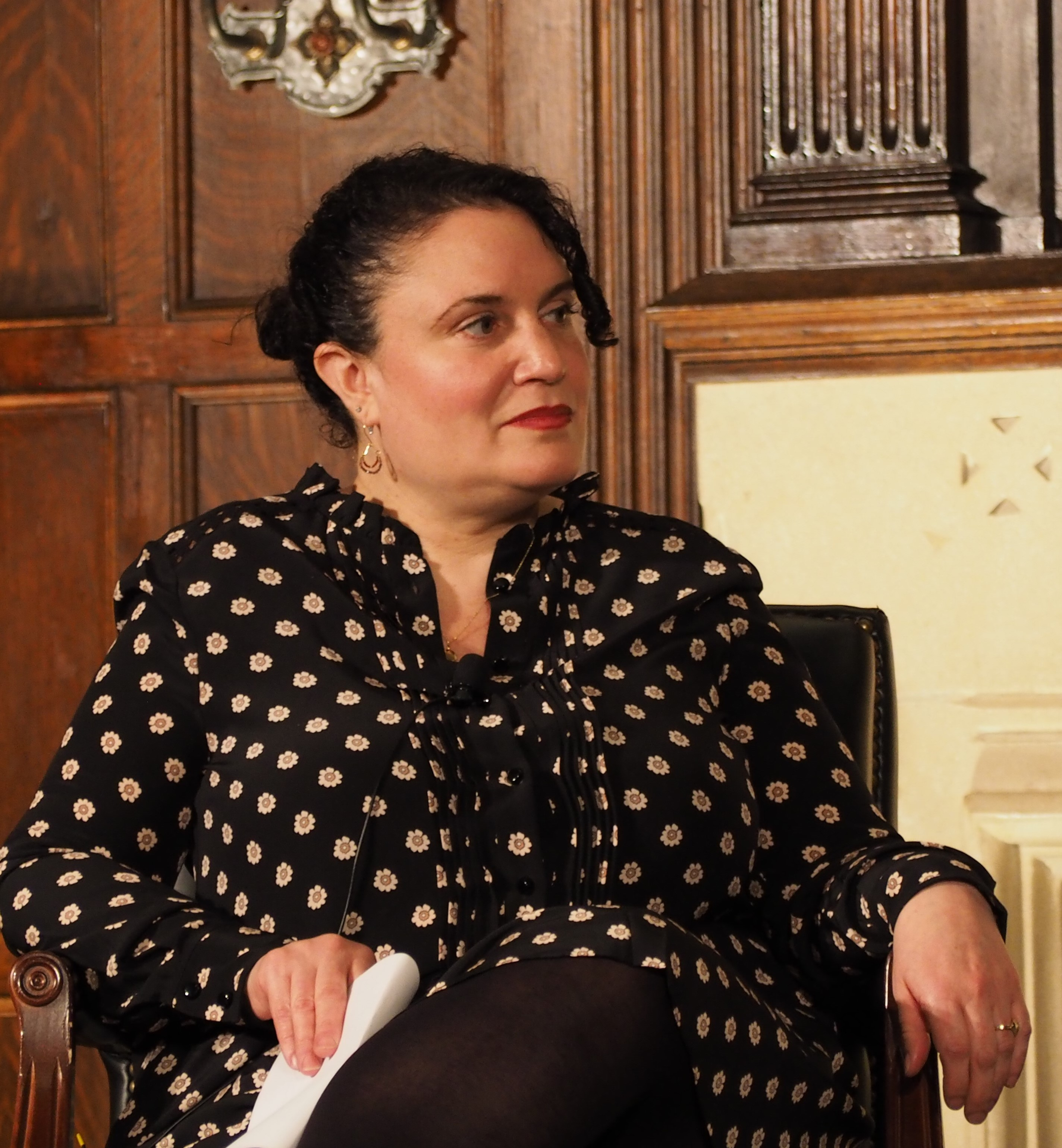
- Fink in 2018
- Education: New York University (PhD); Art Institute of Chicago (MFA)
- Occupation: Author
- Writing career
- Notable awards: Dana Award (1997)
- Website: www.jennifernatalyafink.com

Jennifer Natalya Fink is an American author working in experimental feminist and queer fiction. She is best known for her novels Burn, V, and The Mikvah Queen, which was nominated for the Pulitzer Prize in 2010. Her novel, Bhopal Dance (2018), won the FC2 Catherine Doctorow Innovative Fiction Prize in 2017.

== Life ==
Fink holds a Ph.D. in performance studies from New York University and an MFA in Performance from the School at the Art Institute of Chicago.

She teaches creative writing at Georgetown University.

She is also the founder and director of The Gorilla Press, a non-profit organization that promotes children's literacy through bookmaking workshops.

In 2009, she was the US judge for the Caine Prize for African Literature.

== Awards ==
Won

- FC2's Catherine Doctorow Innovative Fiction Prize, Winner for Bhopal Dance, 2017
- Billy Heekin Arts Award, Winner for Out on Fire, Stonewall Foundation, 2002
- Dana Award, Winner for The Mikvah Queen, 1997.
- Georgetown Review Fiction Award, Winner for “World Records,” 1996
- Writer’s Digest Fiction Award, Second Place Winner for “Vertebrae,” 1996
- Story Magazine Naked Fiction Contest, Second Place Winner for “Spit Bugs,” 1996
- Story Magazine Short Short Fiction Contest, Second Place Winner for “Slipping,” 1996

Finalist/Nominations

- The Clarissa Dalloway Fiction Prize, A Room of Her Own Foundation, Finalist for Bhopal Dance, 2015
- The FC2 Catherine Doctorow Innovative Fiction Prize, Finalist for Bhopal Dance, 2015
- The FC2 Ronald Sukenick Innovative Fiction Prize, Finalist for Bhopal Dance, 2015
- The Willow Books Literature Award, Shortlisted for Bhopal Dance, 2015
- The Pen/Faulkner Award, Nomination for Thirteen Fugues, 2011
- The Pulitzer Prize, Nomination for The Mikvah Queen, 2010
- Amazon Breakthrough Novel Award, Semi-finalist for The Mikvah Queen, 2010
- Glimmer Train Short Fiction Award, Finalist for “Fabrications,” 2007
- The National Book Award, Nominated for V, 2006
- The National Jewish Book Award, Nominated for V, 2006
- The National Jewish Book Award, Nominated for Burn, 2003
- two girls review Experimental Novel Award, Finalist for manuscript of Thirteen Fugues, 1998

== Works ==
Fiction

- Burn. Suspect Thoughts Press. 2004. ISBN 978-0-9710846-8-1.
- V. She Devil Press. 2007. ISBN 978-0-9771582-9-4.
- The Mikvah Queen. Rebel Satori Press. 2010. ISBN 978-1-60864-031-7.
- Thirteen Fugues. Dark Coast Press. 2011. ISBN 978-0-98442-881-6.
- Bhopal Dance. FC2/University of Alabama Press. 2018. ISBN 978-1-57366-064-8.

Criticism

- Performing Poetry, Refashioning Femininity: Anne Sexton's Acoustic Performances. New York University, Graduate School of Arts and Science. 1997.
- May Joseph; Jennifer Fink, eds. (1999). Performing hybridity. University of Minnesota Press. ISBN 978-0-8166-3010-3.
