= University of Saint Joseph, Connecticut =

Catholic university in West Hartford, Connecticut, US

University of Saint Joseph
- Former name: Saint Joseph College (1932–2012)
- Type: Private university
- Established: 1932; 94 years ago
- Accreditation: NECHE
- Affiliations: GNAC
- Religious affiliation: Catholic Church
- President: Rhona Free
- Faculty: 127
- Students: 1,952 (fall 2024)
- Undergraduates: 993 (fall 2024)
- Postgraduates: 959 (fall 2024)
- Location: West Hartford, Connecticut, U.S. 41°46′52″N 72°43′50″W
- Campus: 84 acres (34 ha); Suburban
- Colors
- Nickname: Blue Jays
- Sporting affiliations: NCAA Division III – GNAC
- Mascot: Joey the Blue Jay
- Website: usj.edu
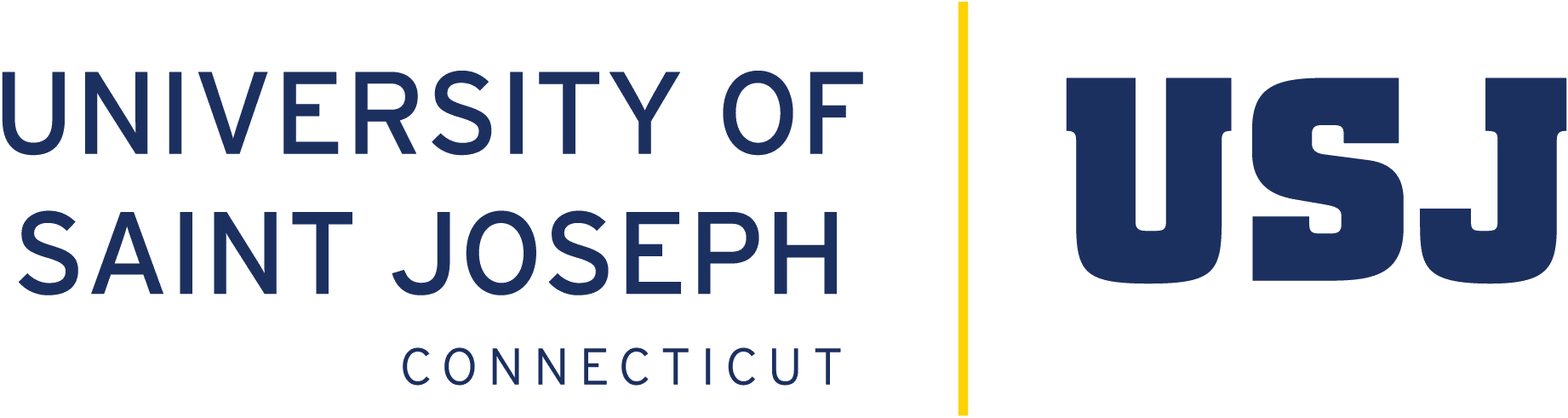

Academic rankings

Regional
- U.S. News & World Report: 1st Overall in CT, Regional Universities North (2025)

The University of Saint Joseph is a private Catholic university in West Hartford, Connecticut, United States. It was founded in 1932 as a women's college by the Sisters of Mercy of Connecticut and began admitting men to its undergraduate programs in 2018. The university is accredited by the New England Commission of Higher Education. There are 857 undergraduate and 959 graduate students (fall 2024).

USJ has more than 30 bachelor's degree programs and more than 30 graduate programs including master's programs and two doctoral programs (Doctor of Nursing Practice and Doctor of Pharmacy).

== History ==
In 1932, the Sisters of Mercy of Connecticut set out to establish the first college for women in the Hartford area. They were determined to develop a curriculum that balanced professional studies with the arts and sciences, emphasised service to others, and was rooted in the Catholic intellectual tradition, whilst welcoming students of all ages, races, religions and cultures.

Psychology professor Pamela Trotman Reid became the first African-American president of the university when she was appointed in 2008; she retired in 2015.

In November 2016, the University of Saint Joseph began its comprehensive research and review of becoming a coeducational institution. Based on this review, the university began admitting male students to all full-time undergraduate programs in the fall of 2018.

=== Notable alumni ===
- Barbara Favola, Virginia State Senator
- Catherine Gentile, author
- Jahana Hayes, United States Representative
- Marilynn Malerba, Treasurer of the United States and 18th Chief of the Mohegan Tribe
- Evelyn Mantilla, former United States Representative
- Maura Melley, former Connecticut Secretary of State
- Antonina Uccello, former Mayor of Hartford

== Facilities ==
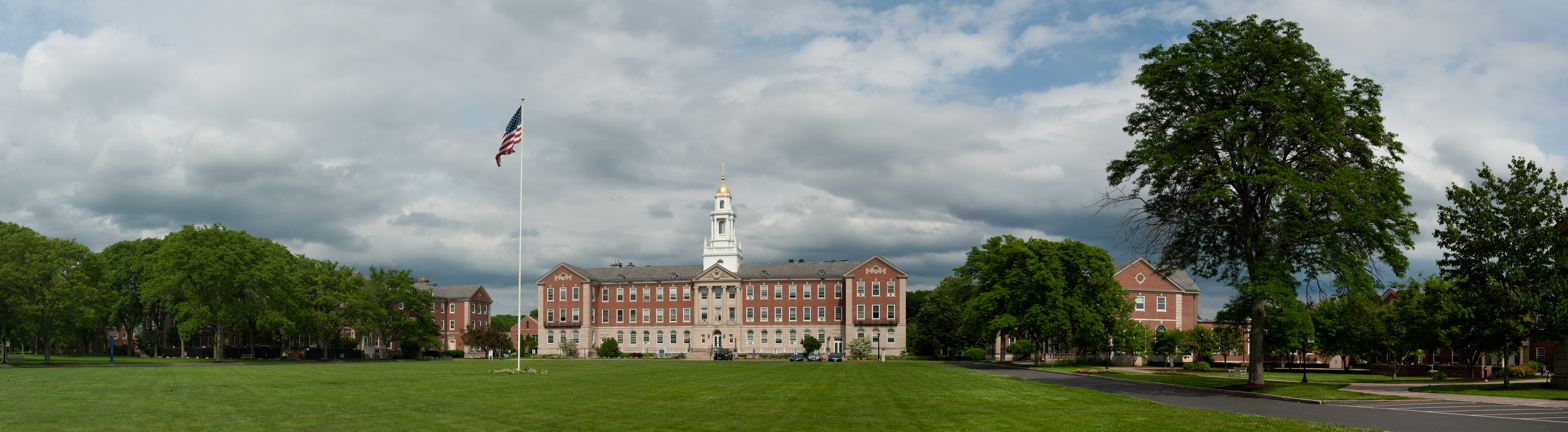
McDonough Hall

The University of Saint Joseph has maintained a distinctive Georgian brick architecture in most of its 19 buildings, including six residence halls, a library, student life building, administration and classroom buildings, and an arts center with a theater and art gallery, among others.

The buildings are arranged around two tree-lined quadrangles on an 84-acre (340,000 m^{2}) campus designed by the Olmsted Brothers. Approximately 73 percent of first-year students live on campus and USJ offers university sponsored off-campus housing at the Millennium in downtown Hartford.

=== O'Connell Athletic Center ===
The O'Connell Athletic Center features a newly renovated fitness center, indoor track, six-lane pool, two gymnasiums, a varsity weight room, and newly renovated locker rooms. The OC's outdoor complex includes six tennis courts, a turf soccer/lacrosse/field hockey field, turf softball field, and grass practice field.

=== Nursing Education and Simulation Center ===
This lab is a combination classroom, clinical practice area, and study space, and provides a high-quality simulation-based health care education. The unit includes an array of medical technology such as an electronic medication system, a Pyxis machine for dispensing medications, and high-fidelity manikins that enable students to practice a broad range of skills.

=== Art Museum ===
USJ's on-campus Art Museum houses a collection of more than 2,800 works of fine art.

=== MakerspaceCT ===
In April 2024, USJ announced its partnership with MakerspaceCT, a 28,000-square-foot workshop and skills development center in Hartford, offering the community support and resources to learn and create. Through this partnership, USJ’s engineering science students will have access to those resources and the opportunity to apply for internships with MakerspaceCT.

== Athletics ==
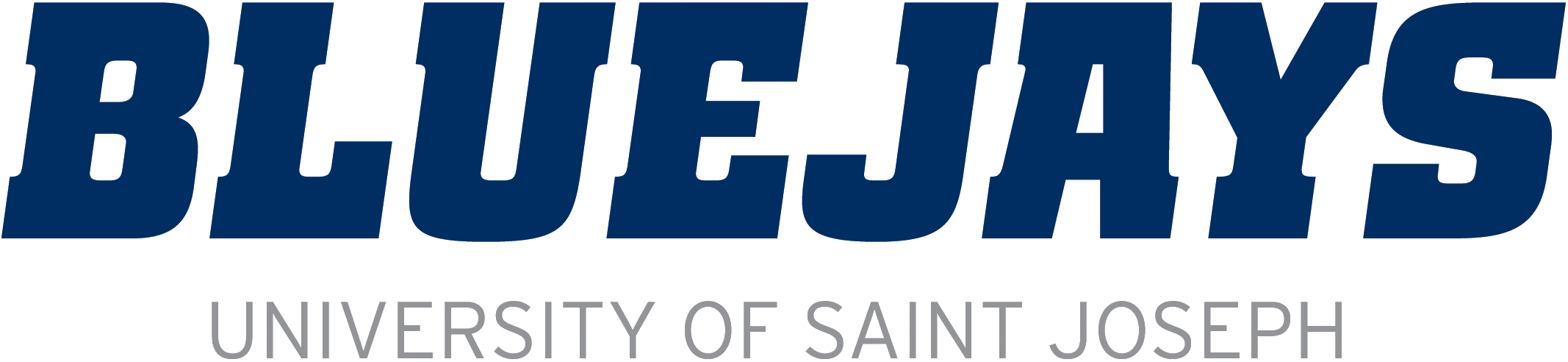
USJ Blue Jays wordmark

In September 2018, the university made headlines by signing Jim Calhoun, a Naismith Memorial Basketball Hall of Fame inductee, as head coach of the newly formed men's basketball team.

The list of varsity sports includes (for both, men's and women's) basketball, cross country, lacrosse, soccer, swimming, and tennis. Men's only sports include baseball, and women's only include field hockey, softball, and volleyball, for a total of 10 sports sponsored by the University of Saint Joseph at Connecticut.
