= Laura-Gray Street =

American poet

- Education: Hollins University; University of Virginia (MA); Warren Wilson College (MFA)
- Occupation: Poet
- Writing career
- Notable awards: Dana Award (2002)
- Website: www.lauragraystreet.com

Laura-Gray Street is an American poet.

== Life ==
She graduated from Hollins University. She holds an M.A. from University of Virginia, and an M.F.A. from Warren Wilson College. She was assistant professor at Randolph College, and serves on the board of the Greater Lynchburg Environmental Network and the Central Virginia Land Conservancy. She is now an associate professor of English, directing the Creative Writing and Visiting Writers Series Program at Randolph College, originally known as 1891 in Randolph-Macon Woman's College in Lynchburg, Virginia.

Her work has been published in The Colorado Review, Poecology, Poet Lore, Poetry Daily, Hawk & Handsaw, Many Mountains Moving, ISLE, Shenandoah, Meridian, Blackbird, the Notre Dame Review, Gargoyle, The Greensboro Review, the Yalobusha Review, New Virginia Review.

She has been a fellow at the Virginia Center for the Creative Arts, writer-in-residence at the Artist House at St. Mary's College in Maryland, and the Garland Distinguished Fellow at the Hambidge Center for the Arts and Sciences.

== Awards ==
- Fellowship from the Virginia Commission for the Arts
- Dana Award in Poetry
- The Greensboro Review Award in Poetry.
- 2003 poetry winner in the Emerging Writers Contest sponsored by the Southern Women Writers Conference.
- 2002 Dana Award
- Isotope: A Journal of Literary Science and Nature Writing
- Terrain.org: A Journal of the Built and Natural Environments

== Works ==
- "Shift Work". Red Bird Chapbooks. January 2018.
- "Pigment and Fume". Salmon Poetry. August 2014.
- "The Ecopoetry Anthology". Co-edited with Ann Fisher-Wirth. Trinity University Press. February 2013.
- "Beggars". Blackbird. Fall 2004.
- "Ring-necks". Blackbird. Fall 2004.
- The art of navigation: a collection of poems. Warren Wilson College. 1996.
- The romance of Measure for measure. University of Virginia. 1986.
