= Paula W. Peterson =

American short story writer

Paula W. Peterson is an American short story writer.

== Life ==
She graduated from Brandeis University and from the University of Michigan with an M.A. in English Literature.

Her short fiction has appeared in Carolina Quarterly, Greensboro Review, Alligator Juniper, Iowa Review, Nimrod.

Peterson currently lives and writes in San Francisco, where she is involved in HIV/AIDS advocacy work.

== Awards ==
- 2000 Bakeless Literary Publication Prize for Nonfiction
- 2006 Dana Award
- Bakeless Prize collection, for "Prognosis Guarded"
- Pushcart Prize.

== Works ==
- "Shelter", Prairie Schooner, Spring 2008
- Penitent, with roses: an HIV+ mother reflects. UPNE. 2001. ISBN 978-1-58465-128-4.
- Women in the grove. Beacon Press. 2004. ISBN 978-0-8070-8352-9. "Paula W. Peterson."

=== Anthologies ===
- Dave Eggers, Viggo Mortensen, ed. (2004). The Best American Nonrequired Reading 2004. Houghton Mifflin. ISBN 978-0-618-34123-8.
