= Deanne Lundin =

American poet, and short story writer

Deanne Lundin is an American poet, and short story writer.

== Life ==
She was born and raised in Florida and has lived in Oklahoma, Boston, California, England and Wales. She graduated from Harvard University, and University of Michigan in 1997 with an MFA. She graduated from the Eastman School of Music, with a master's in music.

She taught at University of California, Los Angeles and the University of Michigan.

Her work has appeared in Painted Bride Quarterly, The Kenyon Review, Prairie Schooner.

She lives in Ann Arbor, Michigan.

== Awards ==
- 2007 Dana Award
- Glimmertrain Short Fiction Award finalist, for "What a Man Can Carry"
- 1997 Hopwood Award

== Works ==
- "Orange Bang"; "The Ginseng Hunter Thinks About Oranges in October ", Michigan Today
- "Empire", Opium Magazine
- The Ginseng Hunter's Notebook. New Issues Press. 1999. ISBN 978-0-932826-72-5.

=== Criticism ===
- "eXtreme verse", Tarpaulin Sky, Summer 05
