= Sam Witt =

American poet (born 1970)

- Born: 1970 (age 55–56); Wimbledon, London, England
- Education: University of Virginia; University of Iowa (MFA)
- Occupations: Poet, professor
- Writing career
- Notable awards: Dana Award (2005)

Sam Witt (born 1970) is an American poet and tenured English professor who currently lives in Brookline, Massachusetts.

== Life ==
Witt was born in Wimbledon, England in 1970. He studied as an undergraduate at the University of Virginia and went on to receive his MFA from the Iowa Writers' Workshop. Everlasting Quail was published in 2010 by the University Press of New England. Witt went on to spend a year in Russia as a Fulbright Scholar to work on his second book. Witt has taught at the University of California at Berkeley, the University of Iowa, the New England Institute of Art, Saint Petersburg State University, the University of Missouri at Kansas City, and as a creative writing lecturer in the English Department of Harvard University. He was a member of the faculty at Whitman College. He is now a tenured member of the English faculty at Framingham State University and served as Jaded Ibis Press poetry editor until its asset sale in January 2016.

== Books and awards ==
Sam Witt's first book, Everlasting Quail, was selected by judge Carol Frost for the Katharine Bakeless Nason Poetry Prize given by the Bread Loaf Writers' Conference run by Middlebury College. His second book, Sunflower Brother, was awarded the Open Competition from the Cleveland State University Poetry Center and was published in 2006 by Cleveland State University Press. Witt won the Dana Award for poetry in 2005. Sam Witt's work has been awarded a number of different awards since then, including: the Meridian Editors' Poetry Prize, 2008; the Briar Cliff Review Poetry Prize, 2008 for "Occupation: Dreamland;" and the Cultural Center of Cape Cod National Poetry Award, for "Dirge for the White Birds. . . ." "The Overburden in Hawktime" was chosen by poet Nicky Beer as the winner of the 2012 Pinch Literary Award for Poetry.

Witt's third book of poems, "Little Domesday Clock" was selected for publication in 2017 as a part of the Carolina Wren Press Poetry Series.

== Poetry ==
- Witt, Sam. (2001). Everlasting Quail. University Press of New England. ISBN 1584651202
- Witt, Sam. (2007). Sunflower Brother. Cleveland State University Poetry Center. ISBN 978-1-880834-74-9
- Witt, Sam. (2017). Little Domesday Clock. The Carolina Wren Press Poetry Series. ISBN 978-0932112798
