= Patricia Brieschke =

American writer

- Education: Northeastern Illinois University; University of Illinois Chicago (PhD)
- Occupation: Short story writer
- Writing career
- Notable awards: Dana Award (2008)

Patricia A. Brieschke is an American short story writer.

== Life ==
She graduated from Northeastern Illinois University, Alfred Adler Institute with an MA, in 1979, and from University of Illinois at Chicago with a Ph.D., in 1983. She teaches at Hofstra University. Her work has been published in Appalachee Review, Karamu, The Rambler Magazine, The MacGuffin, PMS, Rainbow Curve, Sou'wester, and StoryQuarterly.

She lives in Waccabuc, New York.

== Awards ==
- 2008 Dana Award

== Works ==
- "Cracking Open", New Millennium Writings, NMW Awards 23
- "All Of Me", The Sun Magazine, March 2009, issue 399

=== Anthologies ===
- Adam Gopnik, Robert Atwan, ed. (2008). "Cracking Open". Best American Essays 2008. Houghton Mifflin. ISBN 978-0-618-98322-3.
- Lee Gutkind, ed. (2008). Best Creative Nonfiction, Vol. 2. New York: W. W. Norton & Co.
- Linda Longmire; Lisa Merrill, eds. (2001). "Reading Ourselves in The Cannibal Galaxy". Untying the tongue: gender, power, and the word. Greenwood Publishing Group. ISBN 978-0-275-97315-5.
