= BK Loren =

American novelist

- Education: Iowa Writers' Workshop
- Occupations: Novelist; memoirist
- Writing career
- Notable awards: Dana Award (2002)

BK Loren is an American novelist and memoirist. Her most recent novel, Theft, was published in June 2012.

== Life ==
She attended the University of Iowa Writers' Workshop.

Her work appeared in Orion, Women on the Verge, Yoga International, The Art of the Essay, Dutiful Daughters, Parabola, Spirituality and Health, Curve, Berkeley Fiction Review and others.

Loren teaches at the Iowa Summer Festival. and across the U.S. and Canada for conferences, universities and workshops.

== Awards ==
- Mary Roberts Rinehart National Nonfiction Fellowship
- 2002 Dana Award for the Novel
- D.H. Lawrence Fiction Award
- Colorado Council for the Arts Fellowship.
- New Millennium Writings Award for Fiction

== Works ==
- "Cerberus Sleeps". New Millennium. 2010. Archived from the original on 2010-12-16.
- "Got Tape". Orion Magazine and the Future of Nature. 2007.
- "Snapshots of My Redneck Brother". Orion Magazine. March–April 2007.
- Theft. Counterpoint Press. 2012. ISBN 1582438196.

=== Anthologies ===
- Philip Zaleski, ed. (2004). The Best American Spiritual Writing 2004. Houghton Mifflin. ISBN 978-0-618-44302-4.
- Barry Lopez, ed. (2007). The future of nature: writing on a human ecology from Orion magazine. Milkweed Editions. ISBN 978-1-57131-306-5.
- Susan Fox Rogers, ed. (1999). Two in the wild: tales of adventure from friends, mothers, and daughters. Vintage Books. ISBN 978-0-375-70201-3.
- Susan Fox Rogers, ed. (2004). Going alone: women's adventures in the wild. Seal Press. ISBN 978-1-58005-106-4.
- Jean Gould, ed. (1999). Dutiful Daughters. Seal Press. ISBN 1-58005-026-3.
- Phillip Zaleski, ed. [2012]. The Best American Spiritual Writing 2012. Penguin Books. ISBN 978-0143119906
- Marc Bekoff and Cara Blessley Lowe, ed. [2008]. Listening to Cougar. University Press of Colorado. ISBN 978-0870819360.
- Sheryl St Germain and Margaret Whitford, ed. [2011]. Between Song and Story: Essays for the Twenty-first Century. Autumn House Press. ISBN 1932870504.
- Susan Fox Rogers, ed. [1999]. Women on the Verge. Stonewall Inn Editions. ISBN 0312209711.

=== Memoir ===
- The Way of the River. The Lyons Press. 2001. ISBN 978-1-58574-301-8.
