= Julia Flisch =

American novelist

- Born: 31 January 1861; Augusta, Georgia, U.S.
- Died: 17 March 1941 (aged 80)
- Education: Cooper Union, Harvard University, University of Chicago, University of Wisconsin–Madison
- Occupations: Educator, writer, women's rights advocate
- Known for: Advocacy for women's higher education in Georgia

Julia Flisch (31 January 1861 – 17 March 1941) was a writer, educator, and advocate for women's rights to education and independence from Georgia (U.S. state). Flisch was known for her call to "Give the girls a chance!" in her fight for equity in education access.

== Early life and education ==
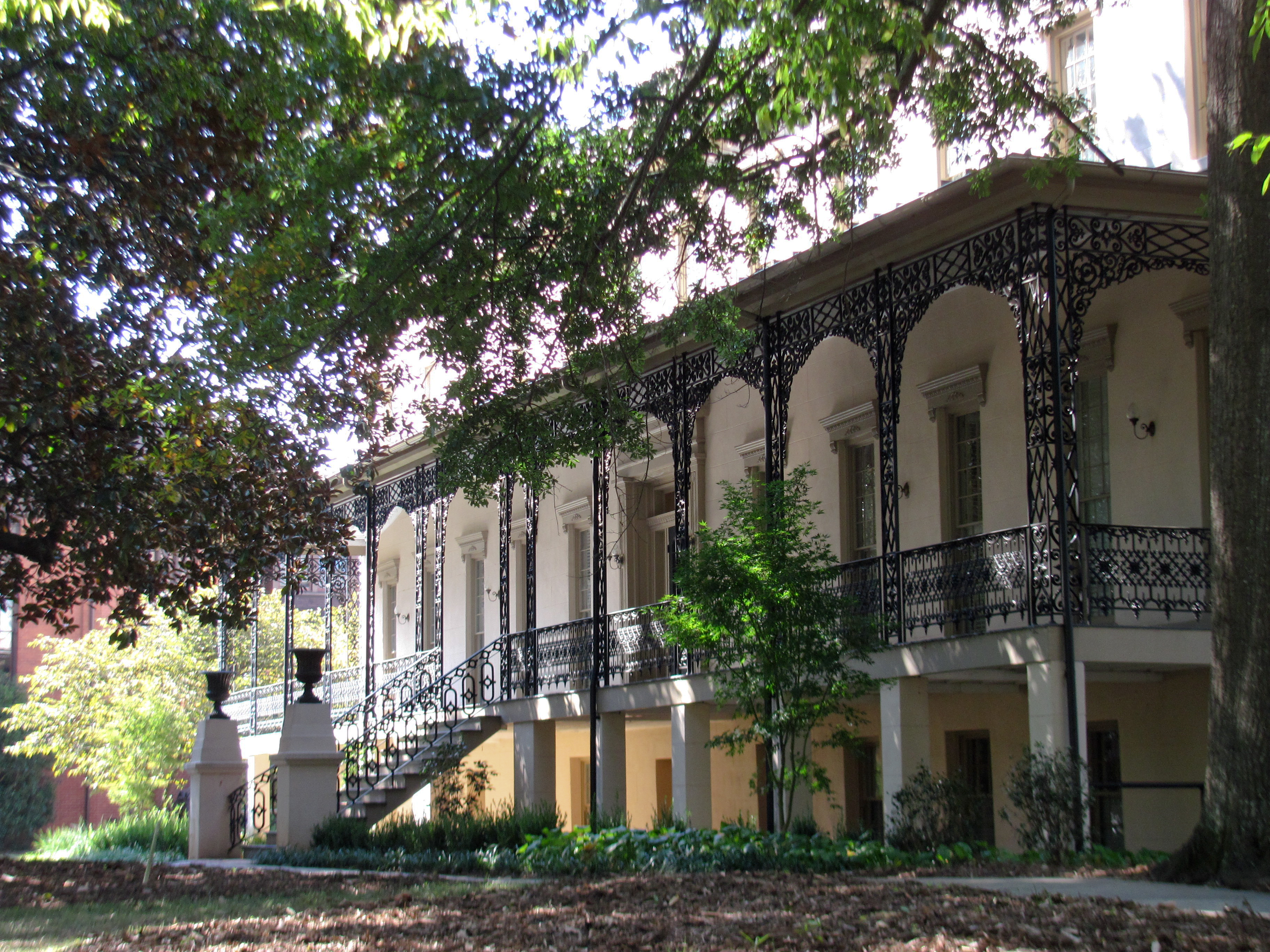
Lucy Cobb Institute in Athens, Georgia

Julia Flisch photo from the Julia A. Flisch papers, Ina Dillard Russell Library, Georgia College, Milledgeville, Georgia.

Julia Flisch was born in Augusta, Georgia. She was the daughter of Leonard Flisch and Pauline W. Heolzapfel, from Switzerland and Germany, respectively. Their marriage and struggle to forge a cohesive identity consistent with America's values inspired much of Julia's personality and storytelling. Flisch grew up in Athens, Georgia, where her father ran a candy shop near the University of Georgia campus. Flisch yearned to attend the university after graduating from the Lucy Cobb Institute, but she was denied entrance in 1869 because she was a woman. Though she rarely spoke of this rejection, it undoubtedly spurned her advocacy for women's access to higher education.

She attended Cooper Union in New York City to study typing, shorthand, and typography. Later, during her summers as a teacher, she would go on to study at Harvard University and the University of Chicago. In 1905, she started school at the University of Wisconsin, where she finished her undergraduate work and then completed a master's degree in history in 1908.

== Activism ==
After she was rejected from the University of Georgia, Flisch published letters and articles in numerous newspapers advocating for women's right to a higher education. Flisch mocked the superficiality of finishing schools and argued that women should receive training that would allow them to earn a living wage. In the 1920s, she led a strike that aimed to procure equal wages for women teachers.

The Lucy Cobb Institute was the first school to offer Flisch a path in life unique to women during her lifetime, and she returned often after graduating with honors in 1877. Her speeches urged women to pursue ambitious lives, and her 1884 address was touted as "the best paper ever read from that platform."

== Teaching career ==
When ground broke on Georgia Normal and Industrial College in Milledgeville, the first public college for women in the state of Georgia, Flisch gave a speech about women's capabilities and eagerness to learn and work. She was the only woman to participate in the dedication ceremony. She joined the college's faculty, beginning her teaching career.

After completing her master's degree, Flisch accepted a job in Augusta at Tubman High School, where she taught for seventeen years. She later became the first female founding faculty member at the Junior College of Augusta and a fast favorite for students. Edward J. Cashin's book A History of Augusta College proclaims, "Her students were convinced that she had two brains: The story was handed from one class to the next as solemn fact and added a new dimension to the wonder which surrounded her."

== Writing career ==
In addition to Flisch's nonfiction writing and newspaper articles, she wrote fiction. In 1886, she published her first novel, Ashes of Hope, about young girls seeking independence. Her second novel, published in 1925, Old Hurricane, received good reviews.

== Honors ==
The University of Georgia gave Julia Flisch an honorary master's degree in 1889, 20 years after she was not admitted, making her the first woman to receive this honor from the university. When Flisch died in 1941, she was acclaimed as having done "more than any other person to advance the cause of women’s education in the state of Georgia." In 1994, Flisch was inducted into the Georgia Women of Achievement.
