= Sandra Stone =

American poet

Sandra Peters
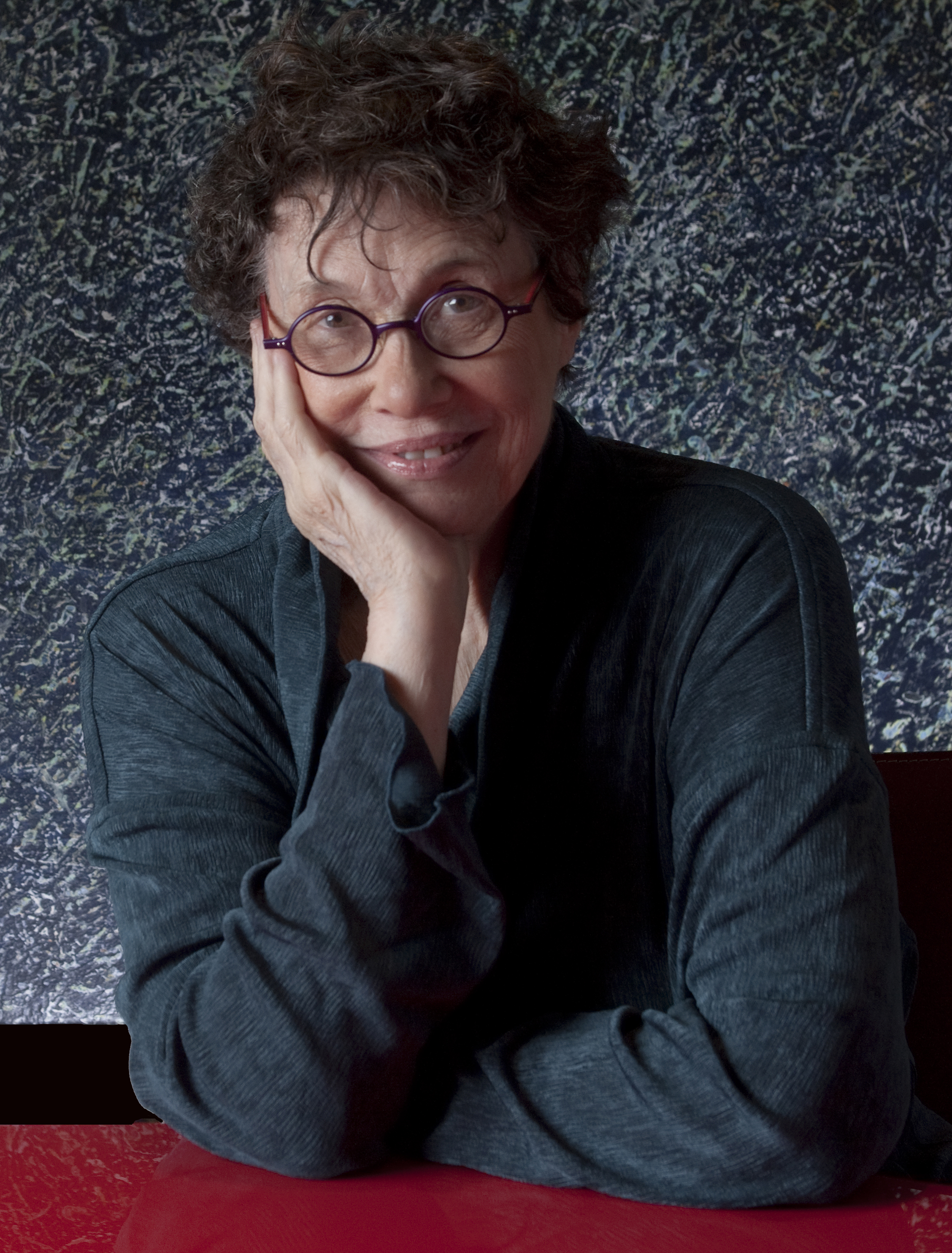
- Born: Alessandria Stone; April 4, 1934; Portland, Oregon, US
- Died: February 27, 2018 (aged 83); Portland, Oregon, US
- Occupations: Author, visual artist
- Writing career
- Pen name: Sandra Stone; Sunny Peters
- Notable works: Cocktails with Breughel at the Museum Cafe, "Snow Whippets"
- Notable awards: Dana Award (2007)

Sandra Stone (April 4, 1934 – February 27, 2018) was an Oregon-based visual and conceptual artist as well as a poet, playwright and author of literary fiction and nonfiction.

== Life ==
Sandra Stone was born Alessandria Stone on April 4, 1934, in Portland, Oregon. She married Mel Peters in 1956 and changed her name to Sandra Peters. The couple had three children prior to their divorce. She had use Sandra Stone as her professional name.

Sandra Stone has received more than 35 commissions from major architectural firms to create art for both public interiors and the landscape. She describes her work as "creating metaphor for space through architectural concepts, context, and literary text."

She was awarded fellowships from Bread Loaf, Virginia Center for the Creative Arts, and Literary Arts Inc. In 2007 her writing won the Dana Award in Poetry. In 2000 her 24-word letter was chosen from among 7,500 entries as the winner of a one-time national competition sponsored by the Consulate-General of Japan and the US Postal Service. Her 1997 collection of poetry, Cocktails with Breughel at the Museum Café, was selected as the winner of a national manuscript competition. In 1998 Stone's book won the Oregon Literary Arts Book Award.

Her work has appeared in The Hudson Review, The New Republic, International Poetry Review, JAMA, The Midwest Quarterly, Denver Quarterly, The Southwest Review, and elsewhere.

She had lived in Portland, Oregon, and sometimes in New York City. She died in Portland, Oregon, on February 27, 2018, at the age of 83.

== Awards ==
- 2015 Oregon Book Award Finalist: Absurdist or, Is It? [:] Angus L. Bowmer Award
- 2014 Artist's Repertory Theater: Awarded 501-C3 status for 3 inter-related comic operas
- 2013 Oregon Book Award Finalist: The Inmost House [:] Memory Making Journeying Dwelling
- 2013 Omnidawn Publishing Featured Poet: Two Treaties on Ecstasy + Creative Bio
- 2012 Winner: Hunger Mountain: Philosophic Lyric
- 2011 Campbell Corner Philosophic Lyric
- 2010 Lucille Medwick Award
- 2007 Dana Award
- 1998 Literary Arts Book Award for Poetry
- 1997 General Services Administration National Design Award for literary narrative in the Mark O. Hatfield Federal Courthouse.
- 1993 Winner: University of Washington Press: National Broadside Competition

== Books ==
- A Sum of Whirligigs [:] Poems of World Pain
- The Inmost House [:] Memory Making Journeying Dwelling
- Cocktails with Brueghel at the Museum Cafe. Cleveland State University Press. 1997. ISBN 9781880834268.

== Plays ==
- What Everything Is
- POoF
- An Imperfect Place to Dispose of Flies
- Yes, Out

== Composers ==
- John Vergin
- Theresa Koon

== Librettist ==
- Sandra Stone

== Poems ==
- "Snow Whippets," PSA Lucille Medwick Award
- "The Sadness of Penmanship", Omnidawn Poetry Feature
- "For a Friend Who Decided Early to Stop Dialysis", JAMA
- "Taking A Piece Of Paper To The Bodyshop For Advice", Poetry in Motion

=== Anthologies ===
- Christopher Buckley; Christopher Howell, eds. (2011). Aspects of Robinson Homage to Weldon Kees. The Backwaters Press.
- Sharon Wood Wortman and Joseph Boquiren, ed. (2007). Walking Bridges Using Poetry as a Compass: Poems about Bridges Real and Imagined, with Directions for Five Self-Guided Explorations. Urban Adventure Press. ISBN 978-0-9787365-3-8.
- David Biespiel, ed. (2006). Long Journey: Contemporary Northwest Poets. Oregon State University Press. ISBN 978-0-87071-098-8.
- Barbara LaMorticella and Steve Nemirow, ed. (2000). Portland Lights: A Poetry Anthology. Nine Lights Press. ISBN 0-9672060-0-6.
- Aspects of Robinson
