= William Ivy Hair =

American historian

William Ivy Hair (November 19, 1930 – August 6, 1992) was an American historian and the Fuller E. Callaway Professor of Southern History at Georgia College in Milledgeville, Georgia.

== Life ==
=== Early life and education ===
William Ivy Hair was born on November 19, 1930, in Monroe, Louisiana. He attended Louisiana State University (LSU), where he was manager of the school's newspaper The Daily Reveille. After earning a BA and MA, Hair joined the United States Army in 1954. He was honorably discharged in 1956.

=== Academic career ===
After his discharge, Hair returned to LSU as a graduate. While there he met and married Emily Karolyn Stevens. In 1957, the couple moved to Florida State University (FSU), where he was a visiting professor from 1957 to 1963. After finishing his history Ph.D. in 1962, Hair became a visiting professor at LSU. However, he returned to FSU again, where he served as assistant professor at FSU in 1963 and rose to a full Professor by 1969. He also became the chair of the History Department and published his first book, Bourbonism and Agrarian Protest: Louisiana Politics: 1877-1900.

=== Death ===
Hair died on August 6, 1992.

== Bibliography ==
- Kingfish and His Realm: The Life and Times of Huey P. Long
- Bourbonism and Agrarian Protest: Louisiana Politics, 1877-1900
- Carnival of Fury: Robert Charles and the New Orleans Race Riot of 1900
- A Centennial History of Georgia College.
