= Jessica Fisher =

American poet, translator, and critic

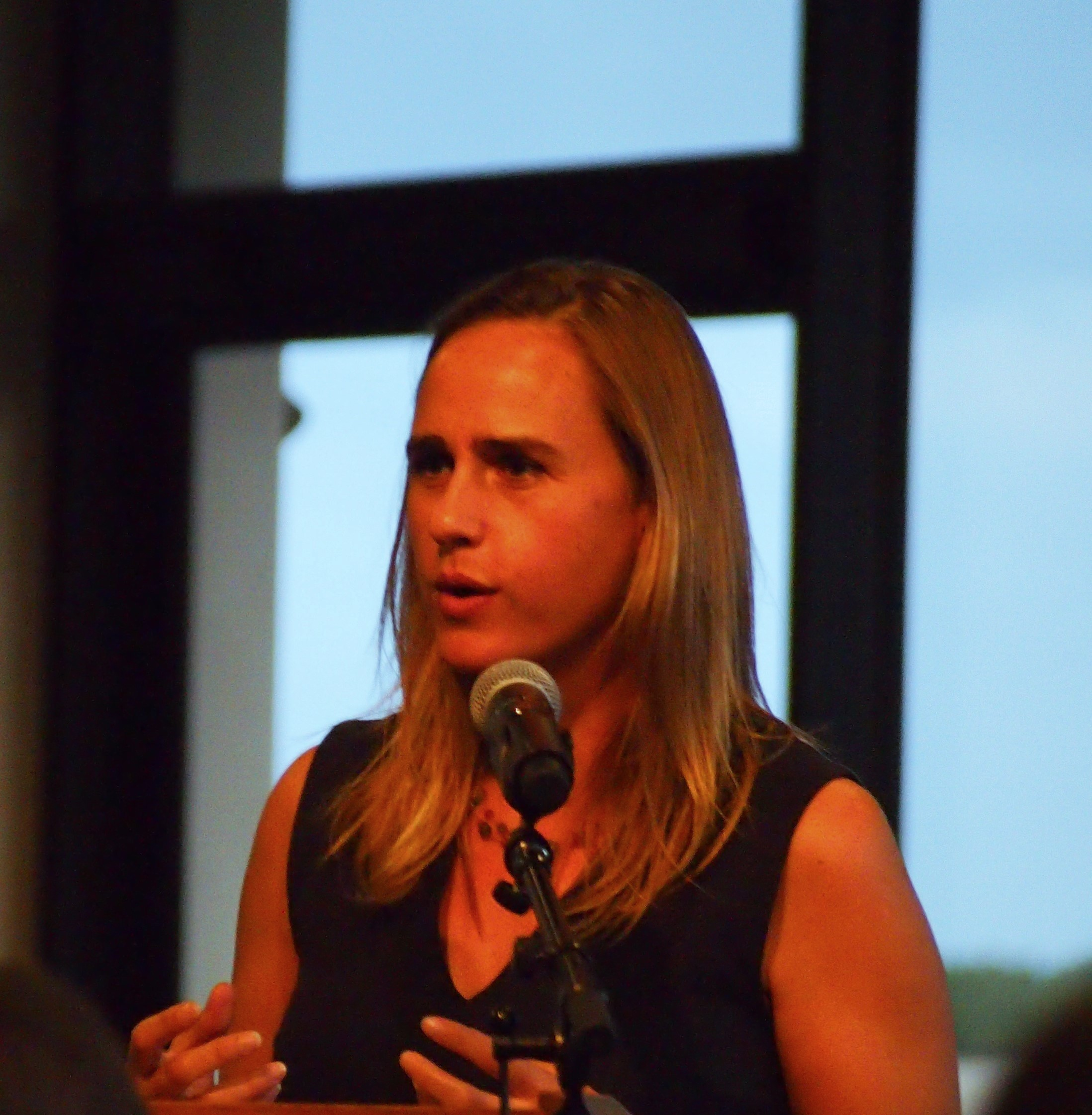
- Born: March 12, 1976 (age 50); Claremont, California
- Education: Swarthmore College; University of California at Berkeley
- Writing career
- Genre: Poetry

Jessica Fisher (born March 12, 1976, in Claremont, California) is an American poet, translator, and critic. In 2012, she was awarded the Joseph Brodsky Rome Prize Fellowship in literature by the American Academy of Arts and Letters.

Her first book, Frail-Craft, won the 2006 Yale Series of Younger Poets Competition and was a finalist for the Northern California Book Award. Her second book, Inmost, won the 2011 Nightboat Poetry Prize.

== Life ==
Her poems and translations appear in such journals as The American Poetry Review, At Length, The Believer, the Colorado Review, McSweeney's, The New Yorker, The New York Review of Books, The Paris Review, The Threepenny Review, and TriQuarterly. With Robert Hass, she co-edited The Addison Street Anthology; this book serves as a guide to the Berkeley Poetry Walk, which was named a National Poetry Landmark by the Academy of American Poets.

She holds a B.A. in English and Art History from Swarthmore College and a Ph.D. in English Literature from the University of California at Berkeley, where she was the Holloway Postdoctoral Fellow in Poetry and Poetics from 2009 to 2011.

She is the daughter of Ann Fisher-Wirth.

== Awards ==
- The Joseph Brodsky Rome Prize in Literature, awarded by the American Academy in Arts and Letters, 2012-2013
- Nightboat Books Poetry Prize, 2011
- Holloway Postdoctoral Fellowship in Poetry and Poetics, University of California at Berkeley, 2009-2011
- Northern California Book Award, finalist, 2008
- Yale Younger Poets Prize, 2006
- Djerassi Residency Fellowship, 2005
- Eisner Award in Poetry, 2000 and 2002

== Books ==
=== Poetry ===
- Fisher, Jessica (2007). Frail-Craft. Yale University Press. ISBN 978-0-300-12235-0.
- Fisher, Jessica (2012). Inmost. Nightboat Books. ISBN 978-1-937658-00-7.

=== Edited ===
- Fisher, Jessica; Hass, Robert, eds. (2004). The Addison Street Anthology. Heyday Books. ISBN 978-1-890771-94-2.

=== Translations ===
- The Paris Review, "The Swallow's Testicles," a translation of a poem by Hans Arp
- The New York Review of Books, "Forget", a translation of a poem by Czeslaw Milosz

== Reviews ==
- The New Yorker, Ligaya Mishan
- Library Journal
- Boston Review, Amelia Klein
- Kenyon Review, Meghan O'Rourke
- The Missouri Review, Chad Parmenter
- The Rumpus, T Fleischmann
