= Bernice Brown McCullar =

American educator and historian

- Born: March 6, 1904; Richland, Georgia, U.S.
- Died: May 31, 1975 (aged 71); Atlanta, Georgia, U.S.
- Education: Georgia College at Milledgeville (BA); Mercer University (MA)
- Occupations: writer historian educator lawyer
- Spouse: C. B. McCullar
- Children: 2

Bernice Brown McCullar (March 6, 1904 – May 31, 1975) was an American educator, historian, and columnist.

== Early life and education ==
McCullar was born Bernice Brown on March 6, 1904, in Richland, Georgia, to Merritt Barnum Brown and Carrie Wright Brown.

She studied at Georgia College at Milledgeville, graduating in 1924. She earned a master of arts degree from Mercer University in 1944 and did doctoral work at Columbia University from 1949 to 1950.

== Career ==
She was employed by the Georgia Department of Education as the director of information for fifteen years. She also served on the faculty at Georgia College at Milledgeville as an associate professor of English and journalism, as director of public relations, and as the editor of the GSCW Alumnae Journal.

McCullar had a law degree and was admitted to the State Bar of Georgia in 1929, practicing law for two years alongside her husband.

She was a prominent newspaper columnist and lecturer, traveling around the South for speaking engagements and writing and editing for papers including The Atlanta Journal and Milledgeville Times. On October 12, 1956, she was the main speaker at the annual meeting of the Flint Electric Membership Corporation in Reynolds, Georgia.

== Personal life and death ==
McCullar was a Baptist. She was married to Judge C. B. McCullar, with whom she had a son and a daughter.

In 1965, McCullar was voted Atlanta's Woman of the Year. In 1973, she was made an honorary member of the Southern Dames of America.

She died in 1975 at a hospital in Atlanta.
