= Joette Hayashigawa =

American author and playwright

Joette Hayashigawa is an American author and playwright. Her works include: The Eleventh Anniversary of the Butcher and His Wife. She is also a past winner of the Dana Award for the Novel.

She lives in Vermont.
