= Paul Graham (novelist) =

American novelist

- Education: St. Lawrence University (BA); University of Michigan (MFA)
- Occupation: Novelist
- Writing career
- Notable awards: Dana Award (2005)

Paul Graham is an American novelist.

He graduated from St. Lawrence University summa cum laude with a BA, and from the University of Michigan with an MFA Program in 2001. He teaches at St. Lawrence University.

== Awards ==
- 2005 Dana Award, Novel: A Trained Voice

== Works ==
- A Trained Voice. 2005.
- Crazy Season Stories. Kitsune Books. 2012. ISBN 9780984005802.
  - Crazy Season
  - Visitation
  - On the Funeral Trail
  - Ring of Silance
  - Snow in Summer
  - Thin Boundaries
  - Slider
  - Risk Management
  - Two Lives
  - Safe House
  - Furlough
