= Catherine Gentile =

American short story writer

Catherine Gentile is an American short story writer.

== Life ==
She is a native of Hartford, Connecticut. She graduated from Saint Joseph College (Connecticut) with a master's degree. After a career in special education/mental health, she turned to writing.

Her short fiction has been published in The Hurricane Review, The Ledge, The Long Story, and Kaleidoscope.

She is a staff writer for Portland Trails. She lives with her husband near Yarmouth, Maine, where she is completing her first novel, Sunday's Orphan.

== Awards ==
- 2005 Dana Award
- Summer Literary Seminars in St. Petersburg, Russia fellowship
- The Reynolds Price Fiction Contest finalist

== Works ==
=== Anthologies ===
- Gay Baines; Mary Ann Eichelberger, eds. (January 2003). Hello, Goodbye: Stories, Essays and Poems for the 21st Century. July Literary Press. ISBN 978-0-9675504-2-8.
