= Glori Simmons =

American poet, and short story writer (born 1966)

- Born: 1966 (age 59–60)
- Education: University of Michigan; University of Washington
- Occupation: Poet
- Writing career
- Genre: Poetry

Glori Simmons (born 1966) is an American poet, and short story writer.

Simmons graduated from the University of Washington and from the University of Michigan with an MFA. She was a 2003 Stegner Fellow at Stanford University.

She is the author of Graft/Poems (Truman State University Press, 2001) and the recipient of the 2015 Spokane Prize for Short Fiction. Her work has appeared in Michigan Quarterly Review, Beloit Poetry Journal, Chelsea 79, Five Fingers Review and Quarterly West.

She is the director of the Thacher Gallery, University of San Francisco.

== Awards ==
- 2001 Alice Fay Di Castagnola Award co-winner
- 2001 Chad Walsh Poetry Prize, by the Beloit Poetry Journal
- 2004 Dana Award, for short fiction
- 2005 Camargo Foundation Fellowship
- 2005 Chelsea Award, for short fiction
- 2015 Spokane Prize, for short fiction (collection)
- 2017 Autumn House Fiction Prize

== Works ==
- "Graft", Beloit Poetry Journal, Vol 51, Summer 2001
- Graft: poems. Truman State University Press. 2001. ISBN 978-1-931112-03-1.
- Stephen Elliott; Greg Larson; Anthony Ha, eds. (2005). "Peaches". Stumbling and raging: more politically inspired fiction. MacAdam/Cage Publishing. ISBN 978-1-59692-158-0. [anthology]
- Suffering Fools. Willow Springs Books. 2017. ISBN 9780983231776.
- Carry You. Autumn House. 2018. ISBN 9781938769290.
