= Catherine M. Stearns =

American poet

- Education: Beloit College (BA); Iowa Writers' Workshop (MFA); Brandeis University (PhD)
- Occupation: Poet/teacher

Catherine M. Stearns is an American poet.

== Biography ==
Stearns earned her B.A. from Beloit College and her M.F.A. in Poetry from the Iowa Writers' Workshop, where she studied with Donald Justice, Larry Levis, and Jane Cooper. She earned a Ph.D. in English and American Literature from Brandeis University, where her thesis advisor was the poet Allen Grossman.

Stearns began a long teaching career at the College of St. Catherine in Saint Paul, Minnesota. She chaired the English Department at Belmont Hill School, an independent school in Belmont, Massachusetts, and in 2014 was named Writer in Residence at The Roxbury Latin School in Boston. In 2008, as a Preceptor in Harvard’s Writing Program, she received a Certificate of Excellence and Distinction in Teaching from the Derek Bok Center. She lives in South Natick, Massachusetts, with her husband Richard Klug, a film director and cinematographer.

Her first book, The Transparency of Skin (New Rivers Press, 1988), was a Minnesota Voices Project Winner and a finalist for the Minnesota Book Awards. Her chapbook Then & Again, winner of the Elyse Wolf Prize, was published by Slate Roof Press in 2018. Her most recent book, Out Toward Morning, the winner of the Off the Grid Poetry Prize, judged by John Yau, was published by Grid Books September, 2026.

Her poems have been published in literary journals including The Yale Review, Southwest Review, Salamander, The New Ohio Review, and North American Review. Her poems have been featured on Poetry Daily and in American Life in Poetry. Her work has been anthologized in a collection of British and American Poetry and in The House on Via Gambito, writing by American Women Abroad.

== Awards and honors ==
Her honors include grants and awards from the Iowa Arts Council, the Loft-McKnight Foundation, the Dana Award, the Massachusetts Cultural Council and the Off the Grid Poetry Prize.

== Works ==
- Out toward morning. Boston: Off the Grid Press. 2026. ISBN 978-1-946830-46-3.
- Then & Again. Slate Roof Press. February 2018. ISBN 978-1-64255-798-5.
- The Transparency of Skin. New Rivers Press. April 1988. ISBN 978-0-89823-105-2.

== Anthologies ==
- Harriet Semmes Alexander, ed. (1995). American and British Poetry: 1979-1990. Swallow Press. ISBN 978-0-8040-0988-1.
- Jonis Agee, ed. (1984). Border crossings: a Minnesota Voices Project Reader. New Rivers Press. ISBN 978-0-89823-054-3.
