= Sonja Livingston =

American author

Sonja Livingston is an American essayist and professor at Virginia Commonwealth University in Richmond, Virginia. She has also taught at the University of Memphis and the University of New Orleans Writing Programs in Edinburgh, Cork (city), and San Miguel de Allende.

== Life and work ==
Livingston was born in Rochester, New York. As a child, her single mother moved the family to rural western New York, including time on the Tonawanda Reservation, before returning with her seven children to northeast Rochester.

Livingston's family attended Corpus Christi Church led by Father James Callan where she was one of the first female altar servers and participated in anti-nuclear protests at the Seneca Army Depot, and, later, actions against the first Gulf War. Her experiences of Roman Catholicism and urban and rural poverty in the United States during the 1970s and 1980s largely inform her work, and are the basis for her award-winning memoir Ghostbread.

Her writing is marked by lyricism and a focus on place. She has said: The job of the writer - especially the nonfiction writer - is to get beyond easy categories and judgments. As someone who grew up in a family and setting that are very easily judged (often harshly and incorrectly) I'm especially sensitive to those things, the wrong they do, and the ways they falsely divide us.

== Awards ==
Livingston's writing has been widely anthologized and honored. Her first book, Ghostbread, was selected by Kathleen Norris (poet) for an Association of Writers & Writing Programs Award. Her work has won Nonfiction Fellowships from New York Foundation for the Arts, the Vermont Studio Center, and the Barbara Deming Fund for Women. Her essays have won a Susan Atefat Prize, The Iowa Review Award, and a VanderMey Nonfiction Prize.

== Books ==
- The Virgin of Prince Street: Expeditions into Devotion, University of Nebraska Press, American Lives Series, ISBN 1496217179, 2019
- Ladies Night at the Dreamland, University of Georgia Press, Crux Series in Literary Nonfiction, ISBN 0820349135, 2016 (paperback 2018)
- Queen of the Fall, University of Nebraska Press, American Lives Series, ISBN 080328067X, 2015
- Ghostbread, University of Georgia, ISBN 0820336874, 2009 (paperback 2010)
