= Spinning Jenny (magazine) =

American literary magazine in New York

- Designer: Adam B. Bohannon
- Categories: Poetry, Literary
- Frequency: Annually
- Founder: C.E. Harrison
- First issue: 1994; 32 years ago
- Company: Black Dress Press
- Country: United States
- Based in: New York City
- Language: English
- Website: spinning-jenny.com
- ISSN: 1082-1406
- OCLC: 32467261

Spinning Jenny, a literary magazine founded in 1994, primarily publishes poetry. Published annually by Black Dress Press, an independent press in New York City, the magazine is edited by founder C.E. Harrison and designed by Adam B. Bohannon. Distributed to the trade by Ubiquity Distributors, Spinning Jenny belongs to the Council of Literary Magazines and Presses and has received funding from the New York State Council on the Arts.

The most recent issue of Spinning Jenny contains contributions by Maureen Alsop, Bridget Bell, Ana Božičević, Tina Cane, Bruce Cohen, Rhiannon Dickerson, Kyle Flak, Craig Foltz, Lily Ladewig, Stacie Leatherman, Matt Mauch, Bo McGuire, Tracey McTague, James Meetze, Ryan Murphy, Andy Nicholson, JoAnna Novak, Justin Petropoulos, Nate Pritts, Danniel Schoonebeek, Sara Jane Stoner, Paige Taggart, Tony Trigilio, and Jane Wong.
