= Janice Eidus =

American writer living in New York City

Janice Eidus, is an American writer living in New York City. Her novels include The War of the Rosens, The Last Jewish Virgin and Urban Bliss. She has twice won the O.Henry Prize for Fiction, as well as a Pushcart Prize. Other awards include the Redbook Short Fiction Contest, The Acker Award for Achievement, an Independent Book Award, and The Firecracker Award given by the Community of Literary Magazines and Presses.

Eidus' work has been praised by critics.

Eidus has taught at such universities as Morningside College, Carlow University, the University of New Orleans, and The New School and at numerous writers' conferences, including The Writers Workshop of San Miguel de Allende, Mexico, Sanibel Island Writers Conference, and the Chautauqua Writers Conference.

== See also ==
- Lists of American writers
- List of Johns Hopkins University people
- List of people from the Bronx
