= Ronald G. Wardall =

American poet

Ronald Wardall (February 12, 1937 Yakima, Washington - January 21, 2006) was an American poet.

== Life ==
He was educated at the University of Washington and the New School for Social Research. Wardall lived in Brooklyn Heights, New York.

His work appeared in Poetry, Field, Swink, Mudfish, and Skidrow Penthouse.

A Chapbook award has been named for him. His full-length collection, "Lightning's Dance Floor", was published by Rain Mountain Press in 2010.

== Awards ==
- 2001 New York Foundation for the Arts Fellowship
- 2001 Dana Award

== Works ==
- The Presence of a Weight, was published as part of the New School Series.
- The Eyes of a Vertical Cut. Slipstream. 2001.
- Lightning's Dance Floor Rain Mountain Press, 2010
