= Opal J. Moore =

African-American writer

- Born: 1953 (age 71–72); Chicago, Illinois, U.S.
- Education: Illinois Wesleyan University (BA); University of Iowa (MA); Iowa Writers' Workshop (MFA)
- Occupation(s): Writer, professor
- Employer: Spelman College
- Awards: Fulbright Scholarship

Opal J. Moore (born 1953) is an African-American poet, short-story author, and professor.

== Life and career ==
Moore was born in Chicago, Illinois, in 1953. Moore received a BFA from Illinois Wesleyan University in 1974, an MA in fine arts from the University of Iowa School of Art in 1981, and an MFA from the Iowa Writers' Workshop in 1982.

She has taught at Virginia Commonwealth University, Kassel University, and Radford University. She was awarded a Fulbright Scholarship in 1993 and taught African-American literature at the University of Mainz in Germany. In 1997, she joined the faculty of Spelman College in the Department of English. During her time at Spelman she also served as department chair. Her work has been featured and archived by the Furious Flower Poetry Center. Moore is a member of The Wintergreen Women Writers Collective.

== Works ==
=== Literary criticism ===
- "Redefining the art of poetry" The Cambridge History of African American Literature (2011)

=== Poetry ===
- "Freeing ourselves of history: The slave closet", "A poem: For free" Obsidian II (1988)
- "The mother's board" Callaloo (1996)
- Lot's Daughters (2004)
- "Eulogy for Sister", "The Taste of Life Going On" Furious Flower: African American Poetry from the Black Arts Movement to the Present (2004)
- "Suite for Trayvon" Boston Review (2020)

=== Short stories ===
- "The Odyssey: (Looking For The Hall Of Fame)" Obsidian II (1989)
- "The Fence" African American Review (1995)
