= Stephen Lovely =

American novelist and educator (born 1966)

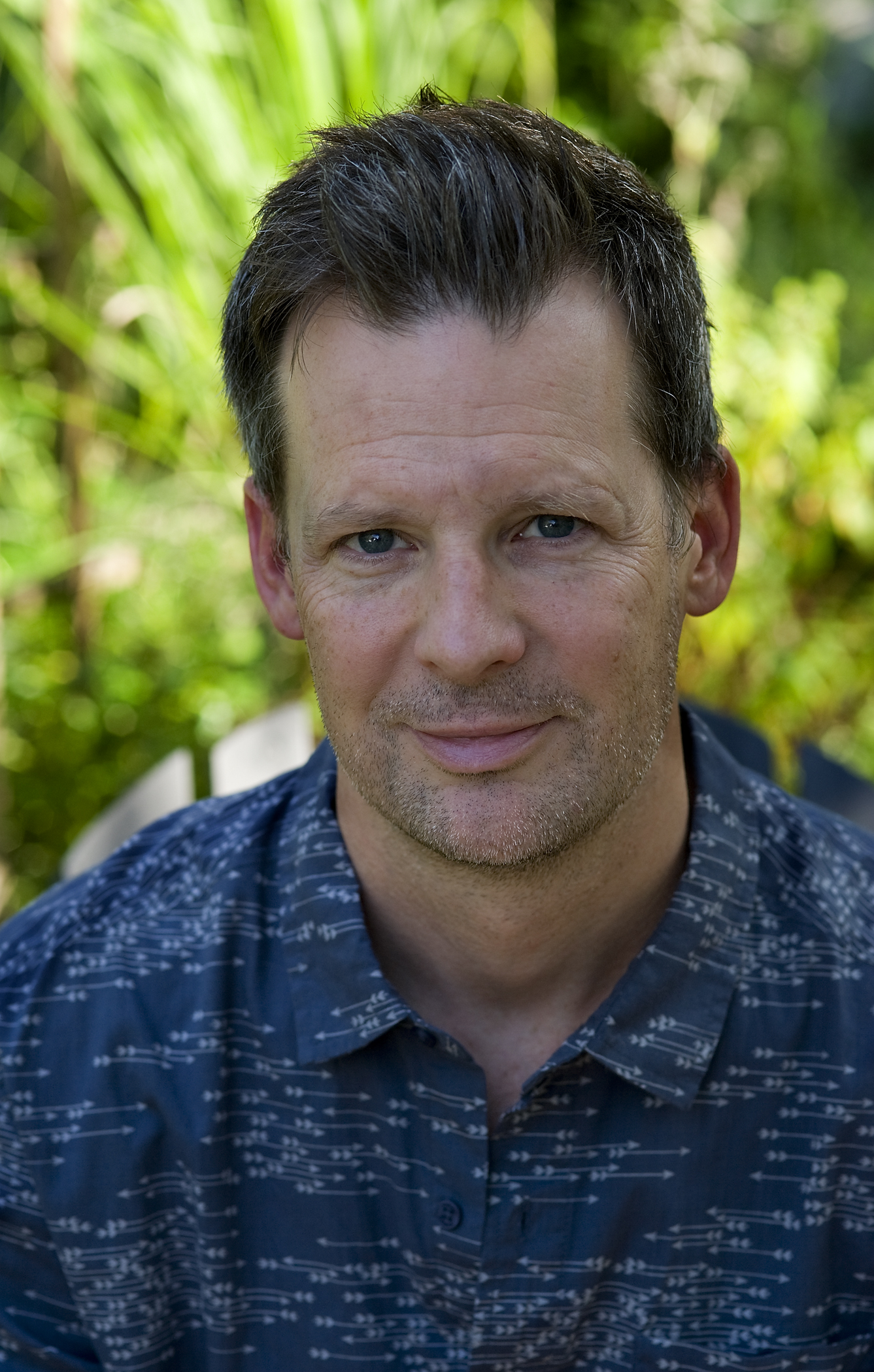
- Education: Kenyon College; Iowa Writers' Workshop
- Occupations: Novelist; educator

Stephen Lovely is an American novelist and educator. He attended Kenyon College and the Iowa Writers' Workshop, where he studied with Deborah Eisenberg, Margot Livesey, Ethan Canin, and Frank Conroy. His first novel, Irreplaceable, was published by Hyperion/Voice in 2009 and translated into German, Dutch, and Chinese. Irreplaceable received the Dana Award for the Novel and a James Michener-Copernicus Society of America Award. Since 2005 Stephen has been the director of the Iowa Young Writers' Studio, a creative writing program for high school students at the University of Iowa. He lives in Iowa City.

== Published works ==
- Lovely, Stephen (2009). Irreplaceable. Hyperion. p. 352. ISBN 978-1-4013-2282-3.
