= Kerry James Evans =

American poet

Kerry James Evans (born 1983) is an American poet. He holds a PhD in English from Florida State University and an MFA in creative writing from Southern Illinois University-Carbondale. He lives in Milledgeville, Georgia with his dog, Merlin.

Evans’ debut book, Bangalore, was published in 2013 by Copper Canyon Press and was a 2013 Lannan Literary Selection. He was interviewed by The New York Times in 2013. Evans's second poetry collection Nine Persimmons is forthcoming from Backwaters Press in April of 2026.

Until its retirement in Spring 2025, he served as the poetry editor for Arts & Letters. Evans will serve alongside Laura Newbern as co-editor on the upcoming literary journal out of Georgia College, Peach.
