= National Register of Historic Places listings in DeKalb County, Georgia =

This is a list of properties and districts in DeKalb County, Georgia that are listed on the National Register of Historic Places (NRHP).

This National Park Service list is complete through NPS recent listings posted July 17, 2026.

== Current listings ==
	Name on the Register	Image	Date listed	Location	City or town	Description
1	Robert A. Alston House	Robert A. Alston House	July 14, 2004 (#04000683)	2420 Alston Dr., SE, off Eastlake Rd. 33°44′44″N 84°18′27″W	Atlanta	Meadow Nook, one of the few extant antebellum homes in Atlanta in its original location
2	Avondale Estates Historic District	Avondale Estates Historic District	December 8, 1986 (#86003669)	Roughly bounded by Avondale Rd., Lakeshore Dr., Kingstone, Clarendon, and Fairchild Dr., also Lake Avondale; 33°46′19″N 84°16′04″W	Avondale Estates	
3	Blair-Rutland Building	Blair-Rutland Building	December 12, 2002 (#02001492)	215 Church St. 33°46′25″N 84°17′40″W	Decatur	
4	Bond Family House	Bond Family House	September 17, 2008 (#08000909)	1226 Rock Chapel Rd. 33°45′21″N 84°04′51″W	Lithonia	
5	Briarcliff	Briarcliff	August 4, 1988 (#88001167)	1260 Briarcliff Rd., NE; 33°47′22″N 84°20′27″W	Atlanta	
6	Briarcliff-Normandy Apartments	Briarcliff-Normandy Apartments	March 26, 2003 (#03000136)	Roughly along Briarcliff Rd., Normandy Dr. and Chalmette Dr. 33°47′18″N 84°20′31″W	Atlanta	
7	Brookhaven Historic District	Brookhaven Historic District	January 24, 1986 (#86000134)	E of Peachtree-Dunwoody and N and E of Peachtree Rds. 33°51′49″N 84°21′02″W	Atlanta	
8	Callanwolde	Callanwolde	April 23, 1973 (#73002137)	980 Briarcliff Rd., NE; 33°46′54″N 84°20′44″W	Atlanta	
9	Cameron Court District	Cameron Court District	September 30, 1982 (#82004662)	E of Atlanta at Braircliff Rd. 33°47′03″N 84°20′26″W	Atlanta	
10	Candler Park Historic District	Candler Park Historic District	September 8, 1983 (#83000191)	Roughly bounded by Moreland, DeKalb, McLendon, and Harold Aves., Mathews St., and Clifton Terr. 33°45′56″N 84°20′22″W	Atlanta	Historic district encompasses the Candler Park neighborhood and part of the Lake Claire neighborhood.
11	Cheek-Spruill House	Cheek-Spruill House	June 9, 2000 (#00000639)	5455 Chamblee-Dunwoody Rd. 33°56′53″N 84°20′03″W	Dunwoody	
12	College Avenue Bridge	College Avenue Bridge	March 22, 2022 (#100007520)	Covered Bridge Ln. (1000 Robert E. Lee Blvd., Stone Mountain Park); 33°48′12″N 84°07′59″W	Stone Mountain	
13	Decatur Cemetery	Decatur Cemetery	May 23, 1997 (#97000459)	229 Bell St. 33°46′56″N 84°17′32″W	Decatur	
14	Decatur Downtown Historic District	Decatur Downtown Historic District	May 23, 2012 (#12000281)	Roughly bounded by N. McDonough St., E. Howard Ave., Hillyer, & Commercial Sts., & E. Ponce De Leon Ave. 33°46′25″N 84°17′37″W	Decatur	
15	Decatur Heights-Glennwood Estates-Sycamore Street Historic District		June 21, 2016 (#16000382)	Roughly Bounded by Forkner Dr., Sycamore Dr., Sycamore St., and the E. boundary of Decatur Cemetery; 33°46′57″N 84°17′16″W	Decatur	
16	Decatur Waterworks	Decatur Waterworks	March 15, 2006 (#06000123)	1400 McConnell Dr., Mason Mill Park; 33°48′28″N 84°18′08″W	Decatur	
17	DeKalb Avenue-Clifton Road Archeological Site		December 14, 1978 (#78003094)	Address Restricted	Atlanta	
18	Donaldson-Bannister House and Cemetery	Donaldson-Bannister House and Cemetery	August 9, 2009 (#09000585)	4831 Chamblee-Dunwoody Rd. 33°55′58″N 84°19′02″W	Dunwoody	
19	Druid Hills Historic District	Druid Hills Historic District	October 25, 1979 (#79000715)	U.S. 29; 33°46′44″N 84°19′47″W	Atlanta	
20	Druid Hills Parks and Parkways		April 11, 1975 (#75002070)	Both sides of Ponce de Leon Ave. between Briarcliff Rd. and the Seaboard Coast Line RR tracks 33°46′24″N 84°19′58″W	Atlanta	Within or near Druid Hills, Georgia, a CDP. Druid Hills Parks and Parkways is inside the Druid Hills Historic District.
21	East Atlanta Historic District		June 25, 2021 (#100006668)	Roughly bounded by I 20; Moreland Ave. Edgemore Dr., Elmhurst Cir., Wainwright Dr., and Fayetteville Rd. 33°43′52″N 84°20′22″W	Atlanta	
22	Emory Grove Historic District	Emory Grove Historic District	March 31, 2000 (#00000300)	Centered on N. Decatur Rd. bet. the CSX RR and the University Park-Emory Highlands-Emory Estates HD; 33°47′38″N 84°18′54″W	Decatur	
23	Emory University District	Emory University District	November 20, 1975 (#75002071)	N. Decatur Rd. 33°47′28″N 84°19′12″W	Atlanta	
24	Neville and Helen Farmer Lustron House	Neville and Helen Farmer Lustron House	March 18, 1996 (#96000211)	513 Drexel Ave. 33°46′17″N 84°18′31″W	Decatur	
25	Dr. Luther C. and Lucy Hurt Fischer House	Dr. Luther C. and Lucy Hurt Fischer House	June 8, 2011 (#11000331)	4146 Chamblee Dunwoody Rd. 33°54′48″N 84°18′46″W	Atlanta	
26	Mary Gay House	Mary Gay House	May 6, 1975 (#75002072)	716 W. Trinity Pl. 33°46′22″N 84°18′16″W	Decatur	
27	William T. Gentry House	William T. Gentry House	May 2, 1985 (#85000935)	132 E. Lake Dr., SE; 33°44′53″N 84°18′04″W	Atlanta	
28	Cora Beck Hampton Schoolhouse and House	Cora Beck Hampton Schoolhouse and House	April 16, 1992 (#92000366)	213 Hillyer Pl. 33°46′25″N 84°17′24″W	Decatur	
29	Inman Park-Moreland Historic District	Inman Park-Moreland Historic District	June 5, 1986 (#86001209)	Roughly bounded by N. Highland, Seminole and Euclid, DeKalb, and Degress and Nashita Aves. Boundary increase (listed October 13, 2003, refnum 03001016): Roughly bounded by Cleburne, Moreland and DeKalb Aves., Battery Place and a city park 33°45′50″N 84°21′07″W	Atlanta	A historic district that spans the DeKalb County-Fulton County border
30	Kirkwood Historic District	Kirkwood Historic District	September 24, 2009 (#09000749)	Roughly bounded by Memorial Dr., Montgomery St., Hosea Williams Dr., Rogers St., CSX RR., & city limits 33°45′02″N 84°20′02″W	Atlanta	
31	Kirkwood School		September 19, 2002 (#02001045)	138 Kirkwood Rd. 33°45′27″N 84°19′20″W	Atlanta	
32	Klondike Historic District		September 27, 2007 (#07001001)	Klondike and S. Goddard Rds. 33°39′06″N 84°07′30″W	Klondike	
33	Agnes Lee Chapter House of the United Daughters of the Confederacy	Agnes Lee Chapter House of the United Daughters of the Confederacy	July 25, 1985 (#85001621)	120 Avery St. 33°46′15″N 84°17′25″W	Decatur	
34	Lithonia Historic District		September 19, 2016 (#16000639)	Centered on jct. of CSX RR. & Main St. 33°42′44″N 84°06′20″W	Lithonia	
35	Longview-Huntley Hills Historic District		March 13, 2017 (#100000730)	Montford, Commodore & Admiral Drs., Shallowford Rd. 33°54′32″N 84°18′07″W	Chamblee	
36	McDonough-Adams-Kings Highway Historic District		December 24, 2013 (#13000965)	Bounded by W. College Ave., Kings Hwy., Oakview Rd. & McDonough St. 33°45′56″N 84°17′53″W	Decatur	
37	Northcrest Historic District		April 17, 2017 (#100000883)	Roughly bounded by Chamblee-Tucker, Northcrest & Pleasantdale Rds. 33°53′21″N 84°14′39″W	Doraville vicinity	
38	Northwoods Historic District	Northwoods Historic District	June 2, 2014 (#14000322)	Roughly bounded by Buford Hwy., Chamblee-Tucker & Shallowford Rds., I-85 & I-285; 33°53′23″N 84°16′34″W	Doraville	Large, intact example of mid-century and contemporary architecture. Developed to provide affordable homes for middle-class workers in nearby industries. Includes a mix of uses as a planned use development.
39	Oglethorpe University Historic District	Oglethorpe University Historic District	August 6, 1994 (#94000779)	4484 Peachtree Rd. NE. 33°52′26″N 84°19′55″W	Brookhaven	
40	Old DeKalb County Courthouse	Old DeKalb County Courthouse	August 26, 1971 (#71001016)	Court Sq. 33°46′30″N 84°17′48″W	Decatur	Courthouse built in 1918 following a fire. Neoclassical in style and granite exterior. Used as courthouse until 1967
41	William and Minnie Pearce House	William and Minnie Pearce House	January 27, 2012 (#11001055)	125 Madison Ave. 33°45′37″N 84°18′43″W	Decatur	
42	Ponce de Leon Court Historic District	Ponce de Leon Court Historic District	November 2, 2011 (#11000774)	Ponce de Leon Ct. 33°46′37″N 84°17′26″W	Decatur	
43	Ponce de Leon Terrace-Ponce de Leon Heights-Clairmont Estates Historic District	Ponce de Leon Terrace-Ponce de Leon Heights-Clairmont Estates Historic District	July 2, 2014 (#14000358)	Roughly bounded by Ponce de Leon Pl., Scott Blvd., Nelson Ferry Rd., Ponce de Leon & Clairmont Aves. 33°46′37″N 84°17′26″W	Decatur	Other Names: West Clairemont (NRHP)
44	Pythagoras Lodge No. 41, Free and Accepted Masons	Pythagoras Lodge No. 41, Free and Accepted Masons	August 19, 1982 (#82004664)	136 E. Ponce de Leon Ave. 33°46′32″N 84°17′47″W	Decatur	
45	Scottish Rite Hospital for Crippled Children	Scottish Rite Hospital for Crippled Children	June 17, 1982 (#82004665)	321 W. Hill St. 33°45′36″N 84°18′09″W	Decatur	Boundary decrease on September 4, 2004 (04000929)
46	The Seminary	The Seminary	November 15, 1978 (#78003097)	6886 Main St. 33°42′36″N 84°06′34″W	Lithonia	
47	Smith-Benning House	Smith-Benning House	June 28, 1982 (#82004663)	520 Oakdale Rd., NE; 33°46′05″N 84°20′32″W	Atlanta	
48	Soapstone Ridge	Soapstone Ridge	May 7, 1973 (#73002138)	Address Restricted	Atlanta	
49	South Candler Street-Agnes Scott College Historic District	South Candler Street-Agnes Scott College Historic District	July 29, 1994 (#94000787)	Roughly bounded by E. College, S. McDonough, S. Candler, E. Hill and E. Davis Sts. 33°45′54″N 84°17′37″W	Decatur	
50	Steele-Cobb House	Steele-Cobb House	June 17, 1982 (#82004666)	2632 Fox Hills Dr. 33°48′15″N 84°16′52″W	Decatur	
51	Stone Mountain Historic District	Stone Mountain Historic District	December 7, 2000 (#00001476)	Roughly bounded by Stone Mountain Cemetery, Stone Mountain Memorial Park, Lucile St. CSX RR, VFW Dr., and Stone Mtn City; 33°48′27″N 84°10′15″W	Stone Mountain	
52	Swanton House	Swanton House	August 30, 1978 (#78000977)	720 Swanton Way; 33°46′19″N 84°18′19″W	Decatur	
53	United States Post Office-Decatur, Georgia	United States Post Office-Decatur, Georgia	July 5, 2000 (#00000753)	141 Trinity Place; 33°46′22″N 84°17′43″W	Decatur	
54	University Park-Emory Highlands-Emory Estates Historic District		August 31, 1998 (#97001638)	Roughly bounded by N. Decatur Rd., Durand Dr., Peavine Cr., and the Druid Hills Historic District; 33°47′24″N 84°18′57″W	Decatur	
55	Villa MiraFlores	Villa MiraFlores	June 23, 2016 (#15000964)	1214 Villa Dr. 33°47′26″N 84°20′24″W	Atlanta	
56	Winnona Park Historic District	Winnona Park Historic District	May 30, 2002 (#02000565)	Roughly bounded by E. College Ave., Avery St., S. Columbia Dr., and Mimosa Dr. 33°46′02″N 84°17′17″W	Decatur	
57	Zuber-Jarrell House	Zuber-Jarrell House	September 30, 1997 (#97001194)	810 Flat Shoals Ave., SE; 33°44′03″N 84°20′17″W	Atlanta	

== Former listing ==
	Name on the Register	Image	Date listed	Date removed	Location	City or town	Description
1	Russell and Nelle Pines Lustron House		March 18, 1996 (#96000207)	January 14, 2013	2081 Sylvania Dr. 33°48′50″N 84°18′16″W	Decatur	Demolished in 2005
