= Adair Park (disambiguation) =

Adair Park is a historic residential neighborhood in the south-west of Atlanta, Georgia.

Adair Park may also refer to:

- Adair Park (Decatur), a suburban neighborhood in the east of Atlanta, Georgia
- Adair Park (Independence, Missouri), a park
- Adair Park (Stilwell, Oklahoma), a recreational site
