= Mary Gay (disambiguation) =

Mary Gay may refer to:

- Mary Ann Harris Gay (1829–1918), American writer and poet
- Mary Gay Humphreys (1843–1915), American journalist and author
- Mary Gay Osceola (born 1939), American Seminole painter and printmaker

== See also ==
- Mary Gay House (built c. 1850), American historic house that housed Mary Ann Harris Gay
