= List of preserved EMD SW1 locomotives =

The EMD SW1 was a diesel-electric switcher built between 1938 - 1953. This list is to summarize the SW1 locomotives in preservation.

== Currently preserved ==
Photograph	Works no.	Locomotive	Build date	Former operators	Retire date	Disposition and location	Notes	References
	804	Southern Pacific 1000	January 1939	Southern Pacific Railroad (SP); Holly Sugar Corporation (HLYX)	1970's (SP)	Stored at the California State Railroad Museum in Sacramento, California	First diesel owned by the Southern Pacific. Built as demonstrator no. 804.	
	905	Central of Georgia 1	August 1939	Central of Georgia Railway (CG); Atlanta, Stone Mountain and Lithonia Railway (ASML); Greenville and Northern Railway (GRN); Carolina Piedmont Railroad (CPDR)	-	Displayed at the Georgia State Railroad Museum in Savannah, Georgia	First diesel owned by the Central of Georgia. Built as demonstrator no. 905.	
	906	Western Pacific 501	August 1939	Western Pacific Railroad (WP); Sacramento Northern Railway (SN); Corn Products Corporation (CPC)	Late 1970's	Display, out of service at the Western Pacific Railroad Museum in Portola, California	First diesel owned by the Western Pacific. Built as demonstrator no. 906.	
	907	Soo Line 320	September 1939	Minneapolis, St. Paul and Sault Ste. Marie Railroad (SOO); Great Lakes Coal and Docks (GLCD)	June 1977 (SOO); 2017 (GLCD)	Operational at the Lake Superior Railroad Museum in Duluth, Minnesota		
	912	Boston and Maine 1109	November 1939	Boston and Maine Railroad (B&M); Montpelier and Barre Railroad (M&B); Pioneer Valley Railroad (PVRR)	-	Display at the Railroad Museum of New England in Thomaston, Connecticut		
	977	Southern Pacific 1006	November 1939	Southern Pacific Railroad (SP); Bethlehem Steel (BSC); National Metal and Steel (NMSC)	-	Operational at the Southern California Railway Museum in Perris, California		
	988	Sacramento Northern 402	December 1939	Western Pacific Railroad (WP); Sacramento Northern Railway (SN)	-	Operational at the California State Railroad Museum in Sacramento, California		
	1021	Lehigh Valley 114	February 1940	Lehigh Valley Railroad (LV); Maryland Port Authority; Ocean City Western Railroad (OCW)	-	Operational at the Wilmington and Western Railroad in New Castle County, Delaware		
	1106	Baltimore and Ohio 8408	August 1940	Baltimore and Ohio Railroad (B&O); Chessie System	-	Operational at the Wilmington and Western Railroad in New Castle County, Delaware		
	1194	Chicago, St. Paul, Minneapolis and Omaha 55	October 1940	Chicago, St. Paul, Minneapolis and Omaha Railway (CMO); Chicago and North Western Railway (CNW); Relco; GE Railcar Services	2006	Static Display at the Hub City Railway Museum in Oelwein, Iowa		
	1458	Boston and Maine 1113	October 1941	Boston and Maine Railroad (B&M); Holyoke Water Power Company (HWP)	1959 (B&M); 2014 (HWP)	Operational at the Berkshire Scenic Railway Museum in North Adams, Massachusetts		
	1564	Louisville and Nashville 13	December 1941	Louisville and Nashville Railroad (L&N)	-	Static display at the Foley Railroad Depot in Foley, Alabama		
	1597	Monon DS-50	February 1942	Monon Railroad (MON/CIL); Indiana Transportation Museum (ITM)	-	Under restoration at the Hoosier Valley Railroad Museum in North Judson, Indiana	First diesel owned by the Monon.	
	1714	Pere Marquette 11	April 1942	Pere Marquette Railway (PM); Chesapeake and Ohio Railway (C&O)	-	Static display at the B&O Railroad Museum in Baltimore, Maryland		
	10538	Commonwealth Edison 15	September 1950	Commonwealth Edison; Midwest Generation LLC	-	Operational at the Illinois Railway Museum in Union, Illinois		
	11216	Washington Terminal 738	November 1950	Pennsylvania Railroad (PRR); Washington Terminal Company (WATC); Amtrak (AMTK); Morristown and Erie Railway (ME)	-	Operational at the St. Louis Union Station in St. Louis, Missouri	Owned by RPCX, occasionally used to moved displayed railcars.	
	18194	Boston and Maine 1127	August 1953	Boston and Maine Railroad (B&M); Luzerne and Susquehanna Railway (LS)	-	To be displayed at the Danbury Railway Museum in Danbury, Connecticut	Only Boston and Maine SW1 fitted with MU Controls.	

== Formerly preserved, scrapped ==
Photograph	Works No.	Locomotive	Build date	Former operators	Retire date	Last seen	Scrap date	Notes	References
	882	Peavey Grain Company 1279	June 1939	Wabash Railroad (WAB); Bonhomie and Hattiesburg Southern Railroad (BHS); Peavey Grain Company	-	Lake Superior Railroad Museum in Duluth, Minnesota	-	Scraped due to engine seizure.	
	1039	Milwaukee Road 1613	March 1940	Milwaukee Road (MILW)	-	Indiana Transportation Museum in Noblesville, Indiana	July 4, 2018		

== See also ==
- List of preserved EMD locomotives
- List of preserved EMD NW2 locomotives
