= Ivy Park =

Athleisure clothing line owned by Beyoncé

- Company type: Subsidiary
- Industry: Sportswear, apparel
- Founded: March 31, 2016; 10 years ago
- Founder: Beyoncé; Sir Philip Green
- Headquarters: New York City, New York, U.S.
- Area served: Worldwide
- Key people: Beyoncé (Founder, owner, chief creative voice, and leader of Ivy Park); Sir Philip Green (Co-founder; no longer involved after 2018); Steve Pamon (Entertainment President & COO, involved in overall business oversight)
- Products: Sportswear
- Owner: Beyoncé
- Parent: Parkwood Entertainment
- Website: www.ivypark.com

Ivy Park is an athleisure clothing line owned, managed, and operated by American singer-songwriter Beyoncé through her management company Parkwood Entertainment. It was introduced in 2016. In March 2023, Beyoncé and Adidas mutually agreed to end their partnership, allowing Beyoncé to retain full ownership and control over Ivy Park. The final Adidas x Ivy Park collection, Ivy Park Noir, was released in October 2023, coinciding with the final night of Beyoncé's Renaissance World Tour.

== History ==
Originally co-founded by Beyoncé and Philip Green, Ivy Park launched a joint venture with Topshop in October 2014 and operated under the company Parkwood Topshop Athletic Ltd. Initially planned for the fall of 2015, Ivy Park's launch was postponed to the spring of 2016, with an official release date of April 14, 2016 for in-store and online retailers.

On March 31, 2016, Beyoncé announced the new line by unveiling two covers for the May issue of Elle magazine. The issue features an in-depth interview where Beyoncé shares her goals for the brand and its focus on women. She explains her desire to "push the boundaries of athletic wear and to support and inspire women who understand that beauty is more than your physical appearance". On the same day, Beyoncé also released a promotional video titled "Where Is Your Park," which provides viewers with a glimpse into her workout routine and includes samples of the upcoming clothing line. The video also tells the brand's origin story and highlights the significance of its name: Ivy represents her daughter Blue Ivy Carter, and Park, represents Parkwood Park in Houston, where Beyoncé used to go to exercise and find personal strength. She elaborated in the video:

“I would wake up in the morning, and my dad would come knocking at my door, telling me it's time to go running. I remember wanting to stop, but I would push myself to keep going. It taught me discipline. And I would think about my dreams. I would think about the sacrifices my parents made for me. I would think about my little sister and how I was her hero. I would look at the beauty around me, the sun shining through the trees. I would keep breathing. There are things I'm still afraid of. When I have to conquer those things, I still go back to that park. Before I hit the stage, I go back to that park. When it was time for me to give birth, I went back to that park. The park became a state of mind. The park became my strength. The park is what made me who I am. Where's your park?”

The sportswear line includes tops, bottoms, swimwear, and accessories that range from $30 to $200.

On November 14, 2018, Parkwood Entertainment acquired total ownership of the Ivy Park brand away from co-founder Green following allegations of sexual harassment and racial abuse.

== Ivy Park x Adidas ==
Ivy Park and Adidas have collaborated on several collections with the company site describing the "[unity of] two iconic brands, celebrating their heritage while creating uniforms of power,” in January 2021. Matt Powell, a senior footwear analyst at NPD Group, speculates that Ivy Park x Adidas could eventually surpass other Adidas collaborations in sales, including Yeezy by Kanye West.

=== Drop 1 ===
On April 4, 2019, Beyoncé announced the first collaboration between Ivy Park and Adidas. This partnership marked the relaunch of the Ivy Park brand after severing ties with retailer Topshop. In a statement released on the official Ivy Park website, Beyoncé shares, "This is the partnership of a lifetime for me... Adidas has had tremendous success in pushing creative boundaries. We share a philosophy that puts creativity, growth and social responsibility at the forefront of business. I look forward to re-launching and expanding Ivy Park on a truly global scale with a proven, dynamic leader." The relaunch also aimed to put out shoes, performance gear, and lifestyle apparel.

==== Promotion ====
A week before the official launch of the collaboration, Beyoncé sent various orange boxes to celebrities and fans to promote the line. The boxes ranged in size from full-scale clothing racks with the most notable pieces to smaller boxes that included shoes. Some celebrities who received a box include Ellen DeGeneres, Angela Bassett, Kendall Jenner, Ciara, Missy Elliott, Reese Witherspoon, and Hailey Bieber.

==== Reception ====
Hours after the pre-sale launch and 6 minutes after the main launch on January 17, 2020, the collaboration officially sold out on Adidas' website, with the collection's popularity reportedly crashing the website multiple times. The line was available in select Adidas stores worldwide, as well as Bloomingdale's, Nordstrom, Foot Locker, and Finish Line locations in the United States, on January 18, but also quickly sold out. Many shoppers expressed their frustration on social media blaming Adidas' virtual "waiting room" for not being able to purchase any items due to how quickly merchandise sold out.

=== Drop 2 ===
On October 19, 2020, Beyoncé posted a cryptic image on her Instagram page, reading "This Is My Park" with the four-word caption "DRIP 2 October 30". Beyoncé modeled for the cover of British Vogue's December 2020 Issue featuring Ivy Park x Adidas Drip 2 photographed by 21-year old Kennedi Carter. The second collection was inspired by 1980s camp and aerobics workout tape aesthetics, with the collection released in five different color palettes: real coral "Coral Lake", mesa "Honey Drip", yellow tint "Canari", dark green "De-grassy" and green tint "Azure". A second surprise sub-collection, known as "Drip 2.2" or "The Black Pack" that came in black and mesa colors only, was announced and released days after the first.

==== Reception ====
The collaboration also sold out on Adidas' website, as well as on retailers such as ASOS. Fans also expressed frustration again in being unable to purchase items from this collection due to the waiting room or resellers.

=== Drop 3 ===
On January 24, 2021, the Ivy Park official Instagram page posted a cryptic teaser with a winter theme featuring models posing in different apparel and flashes of different shoes, ending with a simple "COMING SOON" caption. Days later, on February 5, 2021, Adidas announced the third collection, “Icy Park", where the collection will "[infuse] alpine silhouettes with faux shearling and performance towel terry materials, adding texture for the quintessential cozy vibe." Select apparel will also feature new brand logo monograms.

==== Promotion ====
The brand also sent out various gift packages to celebrities and influencers, but this time shoes were sent out in chests made of frozen ice. Celebrities such as Lil Yachty and Gucci Mane received such packages. Throughout the month of February 2021, ice sculptures were temporarily erected in locations around New York City to promote the collection, with one being installed in Domino Park, and another two days later in Bryant Park.

=== Drops 4-5 ===
In August 2021, Beyoncé and Adidas released the fourth collection, "Ivy Park Rodeo," celebrating the history of Black cowboys and American Western culture. The collection featured denim, cow print, and western-themed accessories across gender-neutral and size-inclusive apparel and footwear. In December 2021, the fifth collection, "Halls of Ivy," followed, drawing on themes of higher learning and self-expression, with houndstooth patterns, plaid, and neon accents across 89 apparel styles, four footwear colorways, and eleven accessories.

== Controversy ==
In early May 2016, a front-page story of British newspaper The Sun featured allegations that Ivy Park factories in Sri Lanka were exploiting their workers by paying them $6.17 a day, below what they claimed was the minimum daily wage. A representative of Ivy Park responded to the claims by saying, "Ivy Park has a rigorous ethical trading program. We are proud of our sustained efforts in terms of factory inspections and audits, and our teams worldwide work very closely with our suppliers and their factories to ensure compliance". As analyzed by CBS News, the minimum daily wage in Sri Lanka was $2.68, which meant that workers were making double the standard, disproving the allegations.

In early April 2019, after the launch of Ivy Park's collaborative line with Adidas, news broke that Beyoncé had reportedly "ended a potential partnership with Reebok because the pitch team lacked diversity." Nick DePaula of ESPN said that “She had a meeting at Reebok and they had a whole presentation of everything [...] and she kind of took a step back and said: ‘Is this the team that’ll be working on my product?’ [...] ‘Nobody in this room reflects my background, my skin colour, and where I’m from and what I want to do.” Reebok has since "vehemently denied" the claims, stating through a spokesperson that "The report that Beyoncé walked out of a meeting with Reebok due to lack of diversity is categorically false. Our discussions with Beyoncé and her team continued for several months after our initial meeting. We are disappointed that false information is being reported as fact."
