= Adair Park (Decatur) =

Historic and contemporary community in Atlanta, Georgia, USA

Coordinates: 33.771955°N 84.305457°W

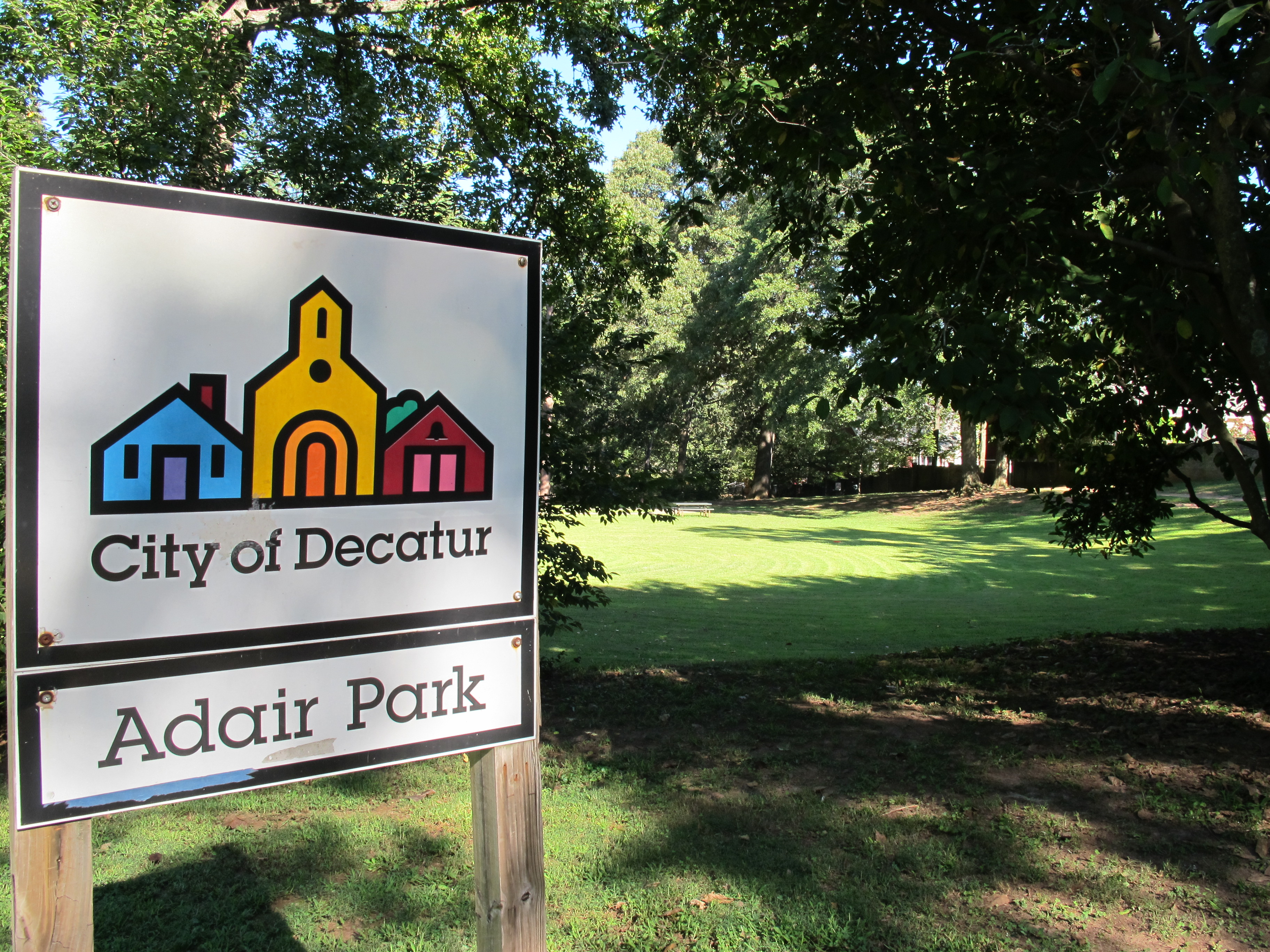
Adair Park, the park

Adair Park is a historic and contemporary community in the west section of the Atlanta, Georgia suburb of Decatur. It is one of Decatur's most diverse communities in terms of building types, and includes several individual neighborhoods. Adair Park has single family residences, townhomes, cluster homes, institutional buildings and commercial buildings – built from the early 1900s to 2008. Its rough boundaries are: downtown Decatur to the east; Ponce de Leon Avenue to the north; Howard Avenue and the railroad tracks to the south; and the Parkwood neighborhood to the west. There is also an Adair Park in southwest Atlanta, but it is not part of the Decatur community.

The commercial areas of Adair Park are on its northern and southern boundaries. Decatur's U.S. Post Office, St. Thomas More Catholic Church, restaurants and retail centers are aligned along Ponce de Leon Avenue in the north. There are also multiple small commercial buildings, as well as the East Lake MARTA station, on Howard Avenue in the south.

== Architecture ==
The Adair Park community's residences include several architectural styles. The most common historic homes are Craftsman Bungalows from the early 1900s. Single-family neighborhoods include Lenox Place, an older neighborhood centered on Drexel Ave. and Melrose Ave., and Rosewalk, a new community on Ridley Ln. The community also contains late 20th Century townhomes that are popular due to their affordability and proximity to downtown Decatur. These include Richmond Green, Decatur Town Homes and Swanton Hill Townhomes.

== Churches ==
Churches within the neighborhood include:

- Atlanta Friends Meeting (Quaker), 701 W. Howard Ave.
- Christ Covenant Church (MCC), 109 Hibernia Ave.
- St. Thomas More Catholic Church, 636 W. Ponce de Leon Ave.

== Festivals ==
- Heritage Festival, Adair Park. This city festival centers on the historic homes adjacent to Adair Park.

== Parks ==
- Adair Park, Adair Street.. Adair Park is informally known as the “Post Office Park” and located diagonally across from Decatur's main U.S. Post Office. This 4-acre (16,000 m^{2}) neighborhood park is centrally located in the neighborhood and includes picnic tables, a playground and a dog park. It is adjacent to three historic homes at 716 & 720 West Trinity: the Mary Gay House; the Swanton House; and a log cabin.

== Transportation ==
- Howard Avenue, is the southern boundary of Adair Park community, and is located on the Eastern Continental Divide.
- East Lake MARTA rail station, is located at Howard Avenue and East Lake Drive..
- Ponce de Leon Avenue, is located north of the neighborhood, and is the primary entry point from Atlanta.
