= Druid Hills Historic District (Atlanta, Georgia) =

Historic district in Georgia, United States

- U.S. National Register of Historic Places
- U.S. Historic district
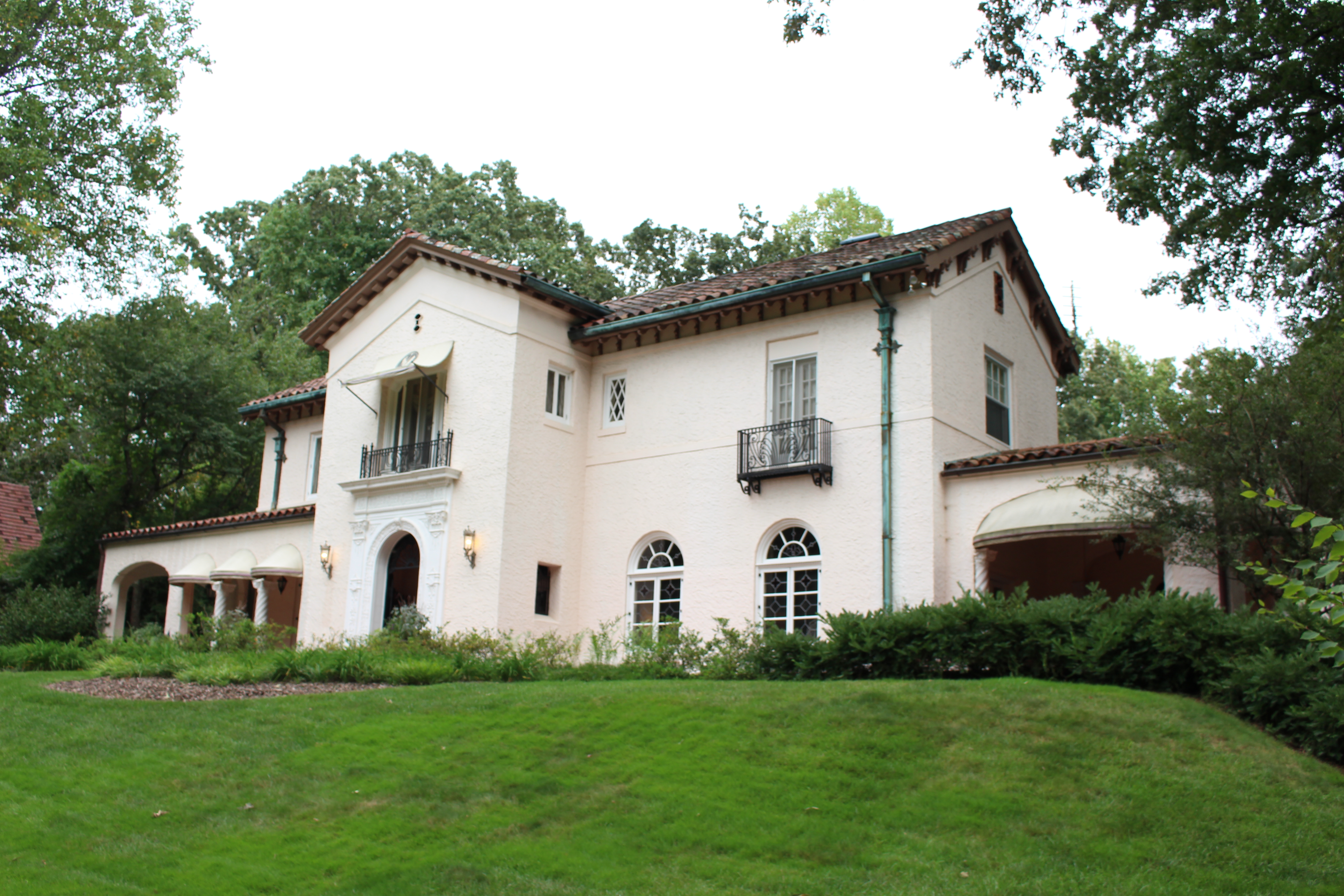
- House in Druid Hills Historic District, September 2016

- Location within Atlanta
- Location: Both sides of Ponce de Leon Ave. between Briarcliff Rd. and the Seaboard Coast Line RR tracks (original)
- Nearest city: Atlanta, Georgia
- Coordinates: 33°46′44″N 84°19′47″W
- Area: 250 acres (100 ha) (original)
- Built: 1893
- Architect: Frederick Law Olmsted, et al.
- Architectural style: Colonial Revival, Tudor Revival, Italian Renaissance Revival (original); Late 19th and 20th Century Revivals, Classical Revival, Bungalow/Craftsman (increase)
- NRHP reference No.: 75002070 (original); 79000715 (increase)

Significant dates
- Added to NRHP: April 11, 1975 (original)
- Boundary increase: October 25, 1979 (increase, renamed)

Druid Hills Historic District is a historic district in Druid Hills and Atlanta in DeKalb County, Georgia, United States, that is listed on the National Register of Historic Places (NRHP).

== Description ==
The district was designed by Frederick Law Olmsted and later by his sons, the Olmsted Brothers. Druid Hills was Atlanta's second major suburb, after Inman Park, and as one of Olmsted's major works, had a significant influence on future suburban development.

Olmsted's 1893 plan for developer Joel Hurt's Kirkwood Land Company was organized around Ponce de Leon Avenue, a broad parkway on either side of a series of parks. Work did not begin until 1905, and in 1908 the development company was sold to Asa Candler, president of the Coca Cola Company and future mayor of Atlanta, who built a mansion at 1428 Ponce de Leon Avenue. Completed in 1936, the development features large mansions on either side of the central parkway overlooking the parks, designed by such architects as Henry Hornbostel, Neel Reid, Walter T. Downing and Arthur Neal Robinson.

The Druid Hills Historic District was listed on the NRHP April 11, 1979. It incorporates the earlier Druid Hills Parks and Parkways Historic District that was listed on the National Register October 25, 1975.

The Druid Hills Parks and Parkways district included Colonial Revival, Tudor Revival, Italian Renaissance Revival architecture in buildings along both sides of Ponce de Leon Avenue between Briarcliff Road and the Seaboard Coast Line RR tracks. This was a 250-acre (100 ha) area that included a total of eight contributing buildings and one other contributing structure. The 1979 expanded listing included an area of 1,300 acres (530 ha) including Late 19th and 20th Century Revivals, Classical Revival, and Bungalow/Craftsman architecture.

== See also ==
- National Register of Historic Places listings in Fulton County, Georgia
- National Register of Historic Places listings in DeKalb County, Georgia
