= Meadow Nook =

Historic house in Georgia, United States

- Meadow Nook aka Robert A. Alston House
- U.S. National Register of Historic Places
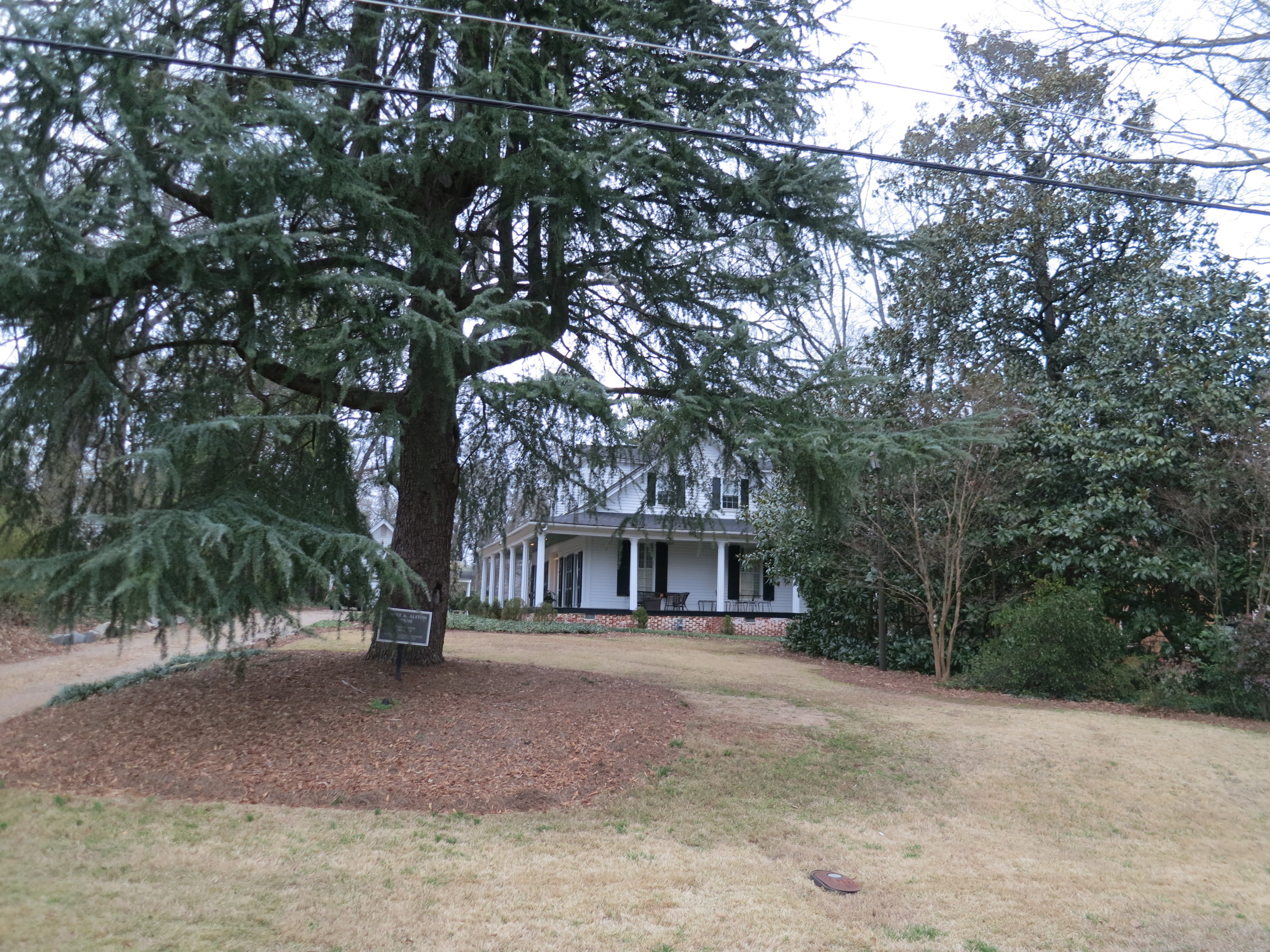
- As seen from Alston Drive

- Location within Atlanta Location within Georgia Location within the United States
- Location: 2420 Alston Dr., SE, Atlanta, Georgia
- Coordinates: 33°44′44″N 84°18′27″W
- Area: 0.5 acres (0.20 ha)
- Built: 1856
- NRHP reference No.: 04000683
- Added to NRHP: July 14, 2004

Meadow Nook is an antebellum house in Atlanta, Georgia. It is located at 2420 Alston Drive in the East Lake neighborhood, in DeKalb County. It is one of only three antebellum homes still standing in their original locations within the city limits.

Meadow Nook was the country home of Lt. Col. Robert Augustus Alston (1832–1879) and Mrs. Alston, the former Mary Charlotte Magill (d. 1884) of Georgetown County, South Carolina. Robert Alston was a journalist and legislator who was murdered at the Georgia State Capitol in 1879, as a result of his ongoing exposés of the abusive convict labor leasing system.

== See also ==
- National Register of Historic Places listings in DeKalb County, Georgia
