= Ammi Williams =

Ammi Williams (November 19, 1780 – March 30, 1864) was an early settler and prominent businessman of DeKalb County, Georgia. Williams married Laura Loomis in 1810. The couple had two daughters, Laura (b. 1820), wife of Lemuel Grant, and Martha Buckingham (b. 1826). Around 1825, he built and lived in the Swanton House, now listed on the National Register of Historic Places and the oldest home in DeKalb County. He purchased land lot 78, which now comprises much of downtown Atlanta. Williams Street in Atlanta is named for him.
