= Missouri H. Stokes =

American temperance worker, writer (1838–1910)

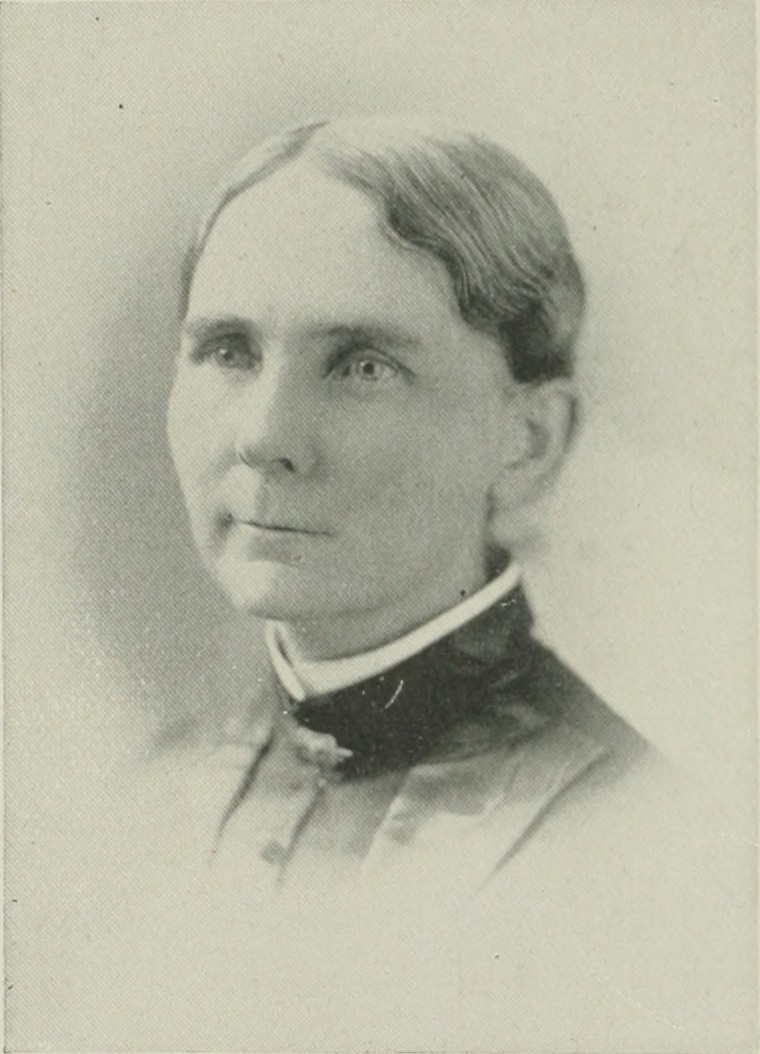
- Portrait from "A Woman of the Century"
- Born: Missouria Horton Stokes; July 24, 1838; Gordon County, Georgia, U.S.
- Died: November 27, 1910 (aged 72); Decatur, Georgia, U.S.
- Education: Hannah More Female Seminary
- Occupations: social reformer; writer
- Relatives: Mary Ann Harris Gay (half-sister)
- Writing career
- Genres: non-fiction; diary
- Subjects: temperance; religion

Missouri H. Stokes (July 24, 1838 – November 27, 1910) was an American social reformer and writer of the long nineteenth century associated with the temperance movement. While working in the missionary field and having charge of the Mission Day School in Atlanta, she found herself drawn into the crusade for temperance after it expanded into the South. In 1880, Stokes became a member of the Atlanta Woman's Christian Temperance Union (WCTU), the first local Union organized in Georgia. In 1881, she became its secretary, and when the State WCTU was organized in 1883, she was appointed State Corresponding Secretary, holding both offices until her resignation in 1893. For years, she was the Georgia Special Correspondent of The Union Signal, and for various papers in her own State, she furnished temperance articles. Stokes was one of the Georgia women to whose efforts the State was largely indebted for the passage of its General Local Option Law and also for its Scientific Instruction in the Public Schools, thousands of petitions for both these measures being sent by Stokes through the post office.

== Early life and education ==
Missouria (often written, "Missouri") Horton Stokes was born in Gordon County, Georgia, July 24, 1838, in the home of her maternal grandfather, Stevens, which had been occupied by the missionaries to the Cherokee. Her parents were Joseph Hale Stokes and Mary Watson (Stevens) Stokes. On her mother's side she was of English, Welsh and Scotch descent; on her father's of Welsh and Irish ancestry. Her paternal grandfather, Stokes, was a native of Ireland, who fought on the side of the Thirteen Colonies in the Revolutionary War, and at its close, settled in South Carolina. His family was a large one. The Stevenses were planters, and the Stokeses were professional men. Rev. William H. Stokes, a Baptist clergyman and an uncle of Miss Stokes, edited in 1834–1843 the first temperance paper ever published in the South. Her father was a lawyer and in those pioneer days was necessarily much away from home. He was killed in a railroad accident, while she was yet a child. Her maternal grandfather, Thomas Stevens, a planter and slave owner. Missouri had a brother, Thomas (Thomie) J. Stokes (b. 1837).

She was tutored at home until she was thirteen years old, with the exception of several years spent in Marietta, Georgia. Her mother and her half-sister, Mary Ann Harris Gay, were her teachers. The family moved to Decatur, Georgia, where she attended the academy. She then became a pupil of Rev. John S. Wilson, principal of the Hannah More Female Seminary, from which institution she was graduated after a three-year course in the regular college studies.

At this period of her life, her then widowed mother and the little family moved to Decatur, Georgia, hear Atlanta. Here, after a few years at the academy, Stokes became a pupil of Rev. John S. Wilson, D. D., pastor of the Presbyterian Church and principal of the Hannah More Female Institute, from which school she graduated in 1858, after a three year's course in the usual collegiate studies. Next to her mother, this man had more to do with the forming of her character than any other person, for he was her pastor as well as her teacher, she having united with the Decatur Presbyterian Church in 1853. Her religious impressions, however, she dated back to her earliest years and her mother's teachings and to a three year's residence in Marietta where, at the age of seven, she began to read the Bible for herself and to take a deep interest in the Sabbath School and the preached word.

== Career ==
=== Educator ===
She became interested in foreign missions, from reading the life of Ann Hasseltine Judson. Stokes showed an early liking for teaching, and after graduating, in 1858, she taught for several years, including those of the Civil War. During the war, Stokes kept a journal. Her only brother, Thomas J. Stokes, was killed in the battle of Franklin, Tennessee. Her mother died soon after the close of the war. Her widowed sister-in-law and young nephew were then added to the household, and she gladly devoted herself to home duties, abandoning all teaching for several years, excepting a music class and a few private pupils.

From 1874 to 1877, she had charge of the Departments of English Literature and of Mental and Moral Science in the Dalton Female College. From 1879 to 1881 she taught a private school in Atlanta, Georgia, and for the next four years, she was in charge of the mission day school of the Marietta Street Methodist Episcopal Church, visiting the parents of the pupils and sometimes holding Bible readings among them.

=== Temperance worker ===
She was at the same time doing service in the WCTU, which she joined in Atlanta in 1880, a member of the first union organized in Georgia. She was made secretary in 1881, and in 1883, she was made corresponding secretary of the State WCTU organized that year. She held both those offices thereafter. She worked enthusiastically in the temperance cause, writing much for temperance papers, and she was for years the special Georgia correspondent of The Union Signal.

She took an active part in the struggle for the passage of a local option law in Georgia, and in the attempts to secure from the state legislature scientific temperance instruction in the public schools, a State refuge for fallen women, and a law to close the bar-rooms throughout the State. She and her co-workers were everywhere met with the assertion that all these measures were unconstitutional. Stokes was conspicuous in the temperance revolution in Atlanta. She made several successful lecture tours in Georgia, and she never allowed a collection to be taken in one of her meetings.

At the 1884 Atlanta Convention, Stokes presented the subject of "Physiological Temperance Instruction in the Schools".

In 1885, she visited the moonshiner sections of Georgia. In October of that year, it was reported in The New York Times, that upon her return to Atlanta, Stokes stated that temperance people were being persecuted for conscience sake; that temperance people had been excommunicated from Baptist churches because of their principles; that some churches were forced out of the associations because they had advocated temperance; and that Baptist preachers denounced the agents of the WCTU as reformed drunkards. Since 1885, Stokes lived in Decatur with her half-sister, Mary A. H. Gay. The subsequent years were trying ones to her, as her health, always delicate, was impaired.

In 1892, Stokes became depressed after the death of her nephew, Thomas Hale Stokes, the last male member of her family. After a few months, she resigned the office she had held for eleven years, and for five years, her connection with the State WCTU ceased. In 1897, she accepted the State Superintendency of the WCTU press work, but resigned that office in 1902.

== Death and legacy ==
Stokes was severely injured some time before her death, her leg being broken, and on account of her advanced aged, recovery had been very slow. She developed a case of pellagra, and this disease gradually sapped her remaining strength, finally resulting in death at her home in Decatur, November 27, 1910. This occurred very soon after the 1910 Madison Convention at which there was a special reunion of the pioneers of the Georgia WCTU; she was too ill at the time to attend the convention.

The Missouria H. Stokes Papers, including correspondence related to personal affairs, temperance, and religion, are held in the Special Collections at the Perkins Library of Duke University.
