= The Seminary (Lithonia, Georgia) =

Historic house in Georgia, United States

- U.S. National Register of Historic Places
- U.S. Historic district – Contributing property
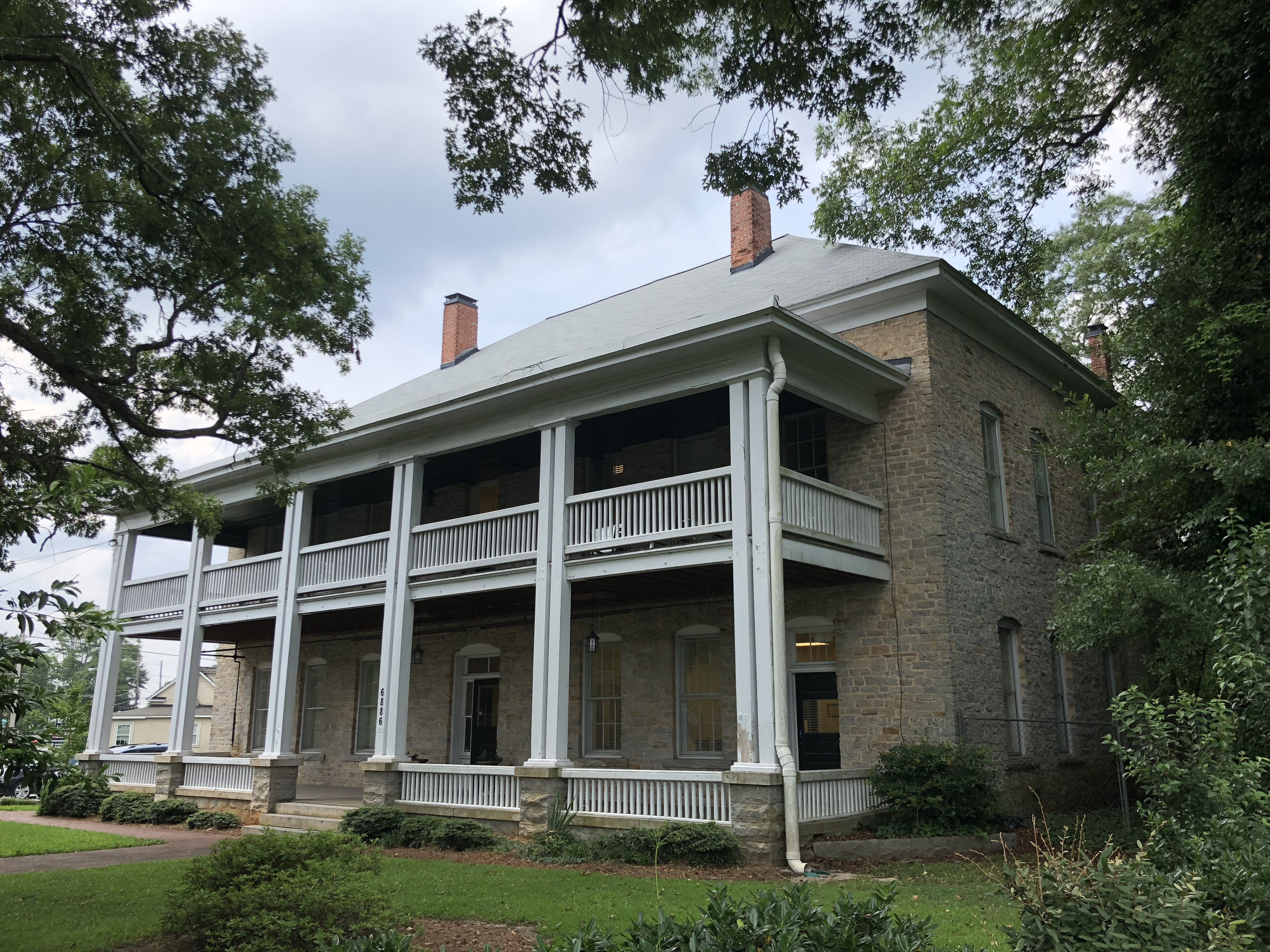
- The Seminary in 2018

- Location within Georgia Location within the United States
- Location: 6886 Main Street, Lithonia, Georgia
- Coordinates: 33.7101°N 84.1094°W
- Built: 1895
- Part of: Lithonia Historic District (ID16000639)
- NRHP reference No.: 78003097
- Added to NRHP: November 15, 1978

The Seminary is a historic building at 6886 Main Street in Lithonia, Georgia. Originally constructed as a school in 1895, over the years it has also served as a hotel and a private home. It is currently used as a multi-tenant office building. It was entered into the National Register of Historic Places (NRHP) on November 15, 1978.

== History ==
The Seminary was constructed in 1895. Benjamin Franklin George had donated land for the creation of a school for Lithonia, in part to educate his own children. Lithonia had no public school system at the time; The Seminary was one of three schools which were privately owned and supported by tuition.

The building was constructed of granite, using stone quarried locally. The town derived its name and much of its economy from granite at this time. The building is two stories with walls made of 19 to 24 inch granite and has a hip roof. The first floor has 12 foot ceilings and the second floor has 16 foot ceilings.

By 1906 a public school system had been established in Lithonia, so the school was closed and the building sold to John Keay Davidson Sr. He was a Scottish immigrant who founded a quarrying company in Lithonia in 1901. Davidson brought in skilled stonemasons from Scotland as workers, and converted the building into the Auto Rest Hotel to house them. It was at this time that the double veranda at the front of the structure was added. The hotel continued in operation until 1917.

In 1917 the building was sold to J.H. Malone, who added interior plumbing and electricity to use the building as a private home. It was around this time a two-story bathroom addition was made at the rear center of the house. A second bathroom addition was made in 1962 at the rear north corner of the house. The house remained in the Malone family for many years.

In 2007 the house was sold to Ellen King Stewart, daughter in law of one of the original students of the Seminary, Dr. Thomas Weir Stewart. The building was restored and redeveloped by Mrs. Stewart as a multi-tenant office building called the Academy Professional Building.

In 2022 the property was sold to Loving Arms Hospice, Inc. according to county property records.

== See also ==
- National Register of Historic Places listings in DeKalb County, Georgia
