= Parkwood (Decatur) =

Neighborhood of Decatur, Georgia

Coordinates: 33°46′10″N 84°18′50″W

Parkwood is a neighborhood on the western side of Decatur, Georgia, a suburb of Atlanta. Although a small portion of the neighborhood was always within the city limits of Decatur, the remainder of the Parkwood neighborhood was voluntarily annexed into the City of Decatur effective July 1, 2014. The neighborhood is bounded by Ponce de Leon Avenue to the north; East Lake Road to the south; the CSX railroad tracks to the west; and Melrose Avenue and the Adair Park community to the east.

Although part of the much larger and historic Druid Hills community, Parkwood is primarily a neighborhood of mid-20th century ranch homes. The neighborhood is notable for its curvilinear street design and large lot sizes. Streets in the community include East Parkwood Road, West Parkwood Road, Parkwood Lane, Upland Road, and Wimberly Court.

North Parkwood Road, located north of Ponce de Leon Avenue, is considered part of the Chelsea Heights neighborhood.

== Parks ==
- Parkwood Park, Ponce de Leon Avenue and West Parkwood Road. A privately owned, heavily wooded greenspace open to the public. The Park is owned and maintained by the Parkwood Garden Club.
- Deepdene Park, Ponce de Leon Avenue west of the Parkwood neighborhood. One of the Olmsted Linear Parks of Druid Hills designed by Frederick Law Olmsted in the late-19th / early-20th century.

== Transportation ==
- East Lake MARTA rail station, is located one block south of the Parkwood neighborhood at Howard Avenue and East Lake Drive.
