= Atlanta, Stone Mountain and Lithonia Railway =

Former railroad in Georgia, United States

The Atlanta, Stone Mountain and Lithonia Railway (ASM&L; reporting mark ASML) was a rock quarry railroad that began operations in 1909. A "common carrier" railroad it had lines connecting to the Georgia Railroad and primarily served granite and gneiss quarries at Lithonia and at Stone Mountain in DeKalb County. It operated 4 miles of track from Lithonia, Georgia, to a quarry near Rock Chapel, Georgia.

Notes on the line say it ran from "Lithonia to Georgia Railroad. Davidson Granite Company, Northeast of Lithonia".

== Lines ==
The ASM&L had two lines on the north side of the Georgia Railroad in Lithonia. One connected to the "Big Ledge" quarry on the north side of Lithonia, one-half mile (0.80 km) from the Georgia Railroad and the other on a route of about one and a half miles (2.4 km) to the quarries at Pine Mountain on the east side of Lithonia (on tracks that were formerly Pine Mountain Granite Company railroad).

On the south side of the Georgia Railroad, the ASM&L had a 4-mile (6.4 km) line from Lithonia to the quarries at Arabia Mountain, a former Lithonia & Arabia Mountain Railroad opened ca. 1889. At Stone Mountain, the ASM&L had a line from the Georgia Railroad around the north side of the mountain to the granite quarries on the eastern slope. It was constructed soon after the Civil War by a predecessor company.

== Ownership and closing of lines ==
Ownership of the quarries included the Venable brothers and then Davidson Mineral Properties, Inc. of Lithonia, who became the owner of the railroad. The line was dropped due to competition from other quarries, trucks, alternatives to dimension stone, and the Great Depression. The Arabia Mountain line was abandoned in 1935 and the Stone Mountain quarry was acquired by the Works Progress Administration and run for another five years. The quarry tracks were taken up in 1942. Rail use continued at the Lithonia quarries on the north side of the Georgia Railroad for several more decades before being closed.

ASM&L gave up its charter as a railroad and merged into Davidson Mineral Properties on November 19, 1997, and the Pine Mountain line was pulled up leaving only the line into the Big Ledge quarry. The ASM&L's locomotive was moved to another Hanson quarry before being replaced for in-plant use by a Trackmobile. It is still operated by CSX.

== Conversion to parkland and rail-trail ==
DeKalb County acquired 400 acres (160 ha) of Arabia Mountain from Davidson Mineral Properties to create a nature park in 1972. Recently, DeKalb County also converted part of the old Arabia Mountain rail right-of-way to a rail-trail. The first 4.5-mile (7.2 km) section of this bike path opened on June 14, 2004.
