= List of preserved EMD NW2 locomotives =

This is a summary, listing every EMD NW2 locomotive in preservation.

== EMD-built (NW2) ==
| Photograph | Works no. | Locomotive | Build date | Former operators | Retire date | Disposition and location | Notes | References |
|---|---|---|---|---|---|---|---|---|
| | 889 | Union Pacific 1000 | November 1947 | Union Pacific Railroad (UP); Stockton Terminal and Eastern Railroad (STER); Western Pacific Railroad (WP); Sacramento Northern Railway (SN) | - | Operational at the Nevada State Railroad Museum Boulder City in Boulder City, Nevada | Built as demonstrator no. 889 | |
| | 4115 | Canadian National 7944 | December 1946 | Canadian National Railway (CN) | 1976 | Operational at the Alberta Railway Museum in Edmonton, Alberta | | |
| | 4161 | Maryland and Pennsylvania 81 | December 1946 | Maryland and Pennsylvania Railroad (MPA); PH Glatfelter Paper Company | 1997 | Display at the Railroad Museum of Pennsylvania in Strasburg, Pennsylvania | | |
| | 4586 | Missouri-Kansas-Texas 1029 | January 1947 | Missouri-Kansas-Texas Railroad (MKT) | - | Displayed at the Wichita Falls Railroad Museum in Wichita Falls, Texas | | |
| | 5240 | Milwaukee Road 1649 | November 1947 | Milwaukee Road (MILW) | - | Display at the Monticello Railway Museum in Monticello, Illinois | Also wore the number 667 in its service with the Milwaukee Road. | |
| | 10598 | Domtar 1001 | October 1949 | Arkansas, Louisiana and Mississippi Railroad (ALM); Domtar | - | Under restoration at the Mid-Continent Railway Museum in North Freedom, Wisconsin | | |

== EMD-built (rebuilt NW2) ==
| Photograph | Works no. | Locomotive | Build date | Model | Rebuilder | Rebuild date | Former operators | Retire date | Disposition and location | Notes | References |
|---|---|---|---|---|---|---|---|---|---|---|---|
| | 1000 | Western Pacific 608 | May 1940 | NW2 | - | February 1969 | Union Pacific Railroad (UP); Stockton Terminal and Eastern Railroad (STER); Western Pacific Railroad (WP) | July 1966 (UP); September 1983 (WP-to-UP) | Operational at the Western Pacific Railroad Museum (WPRM) in Portola, California | | |
| | 3281 | BUGX 1301 | July 1945 | SW1300 | IC's Paducah Shops | December 1971 | Illinois Central Railroad (IC); Chicago Central and Pacific Railroad (CC&P); Peoria and Western Railway (PWRY); Pioneer Rail Equipment (PREX); Dieselmotive Company, Inc. (BUGX) | - | Operational at the Big South Fork Scenic Railway (BSFS) at Stearns, Kentucky | | |
| | 7314 | Southern Pacific 1423 | June 1949 | NW2E | SP's Houston Shops | September 14, 1972 | Southern Pacific Railroad (SP); Parr Terminal Railroad (PTRR) | 1986 | Operational at the Niles Canyon Railway in Sunol, California | | |

== Formerly preserved, scrapped ==
=== EMD-built (rebuilt) ===
| Photograph | Works no. | Locomotive | Build date | Model | Rebuild date | Rebuilder | Former operators | Retire date | Last seen | Scrap date | Cause of scrapping | Notes | References |
|---|---|---|---|---|---|---|---|---|---|---|---|---|---|
| | 7328 | Southern Pacific 1303 | June 1949 | NW2E | April 8, 1971 | - | Texas and New Orleans Railroad (TNO); Southern Pacific Railroad (SP) | - | Galveston Railroad Museum in Galveston, Texas | 2012 | Severely water damaged by Hurricane Ike on September 13, 2008 | | |
