= Adair Park (Independence, Missouri) =

Park in Missouri, United States

Coordinates: 39°2′24.5″N 94°23′21.7″W

Adair Park is an urban park in Independence, Missouri. The 40-acre park is equipped with a softball field and walking trail. The park has the name of Joseph Adair, the first white child born within the county's borders.
