= Swanton House =

Historic house in Georgia, United States

- U.S. National Register of Historic Places
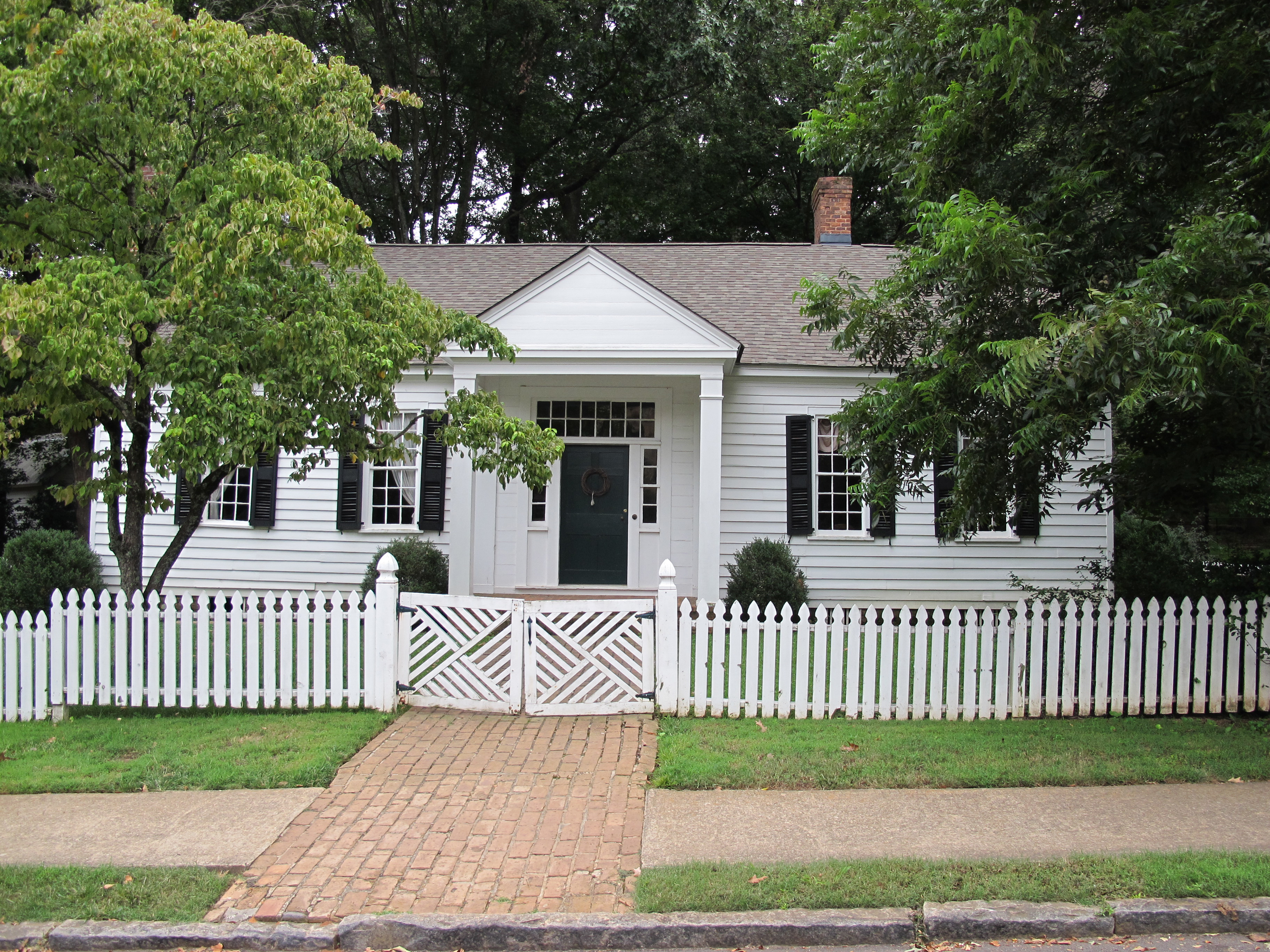

- Location within Atlanta Location within Georgia Location within the United States
- Location: 720 West Trinity Place, Decatur, Georgia
- Coordinates: 33.772516°N 84.304736°W.
- Built: c. 1824, 1850
- Architectural style: Plantation Plain
- NRHP reference No.: 78000977
- Added to NRHP: August 30, 1978

The Swanton House is a historic building in downtown Decatur, Georgia and is one of a very few pre-Civil War buildings in the area which are still standing. It was entered into the National Register of Historic Places on August 30, 1978.

== History ==
The original two-room log cabin portion of the house was constructed at 240 Atlanta Avenue by Burwell Johnson around 1825, and later sold to Ammi Williams. (Exact details were lost when many records burned in the DeKalb courthouse fire of 1842.) The house was updated several times, adding several rooms and a porch.

The house is named for Benjamin Franklin Swanton, who came from New Hampshire to Georgia in the 1830s during the Georgia Gold Rush to sell mining equipment. Swanton purchased the house in 1852 when he moved to Decatur to sell cotton gins. Swanton became a successful businessman in Decatur with a sawmill, gristmill, brickyard, tannery and machine shop.

Swanton, his wife and daughter fled to Maine during the Civil War, leaving the house in the care of a widow Mrs. Johnson. On July 19, 1864, the house became the headquarters of the Army of the Tennessee, on their way to participate in the Battle of Atlanta. The presence of General Thomas W. Sweeny at the Swanton House is recorded in records of the time. Later, when General Sherman ordered the occupation of Atlanta in September 1864, the Army of the Ohio used the Swanton House as its headquarters. The house was thus spared destruction in the war.

The property remained in the Swanton family until the 1960s. Beginning in 1957, concern was shown for preserving the house due to the commercialization of downtown Decatur. By the mid-1960s the house was threatened by urban renewal efforts in the area.

The family sold the property in January 1965 to the Decatur Housing Authority, with an option to retain and restore the house. Atlanta banker Mills Lane was interested in preserving the house, and bought the structure from the family. He ultimately decided in 1970 to move the house to preserve it. Lane provided funds for restoration by the DeKalb History Center, providing the city could provide a location for the house. In April 1970 the city commission supplied a portion of Ebster Park facing West Trinity Place for this purpose.

The house was moved and restored, along with the original historical marker dating from 1957. It was reopened and dedicated in 1972. It also now sits adjacent to the Mary Gay House on West Trinity Place in the Adair Park neighborhood of Decatur. Although it is not in its original historic location, it does still sit on land owned by Swanton which was used for his tannery. Other historic structures have been moved nearby by the DeKalb History Center including the Biffle cabin and the Thomas-Barber cabin.

The current location has posed some challenges, for example the close proximity of the four structures to each other does not represent how these buildings would have appeared originally. The current location of Swanton House is also wetter than its original location, causing a problem with mold. Nearly $40,000 in repairs have been made since 2008 to mitigate this.

== See also ==
- National Register of Historic Places listings in DeKalb County, Georgia
