= Donaldson-Bannister House and Cemetery =

Historic site in DeKalb County, Georgia, US

- U.S. National Register of Historic Places
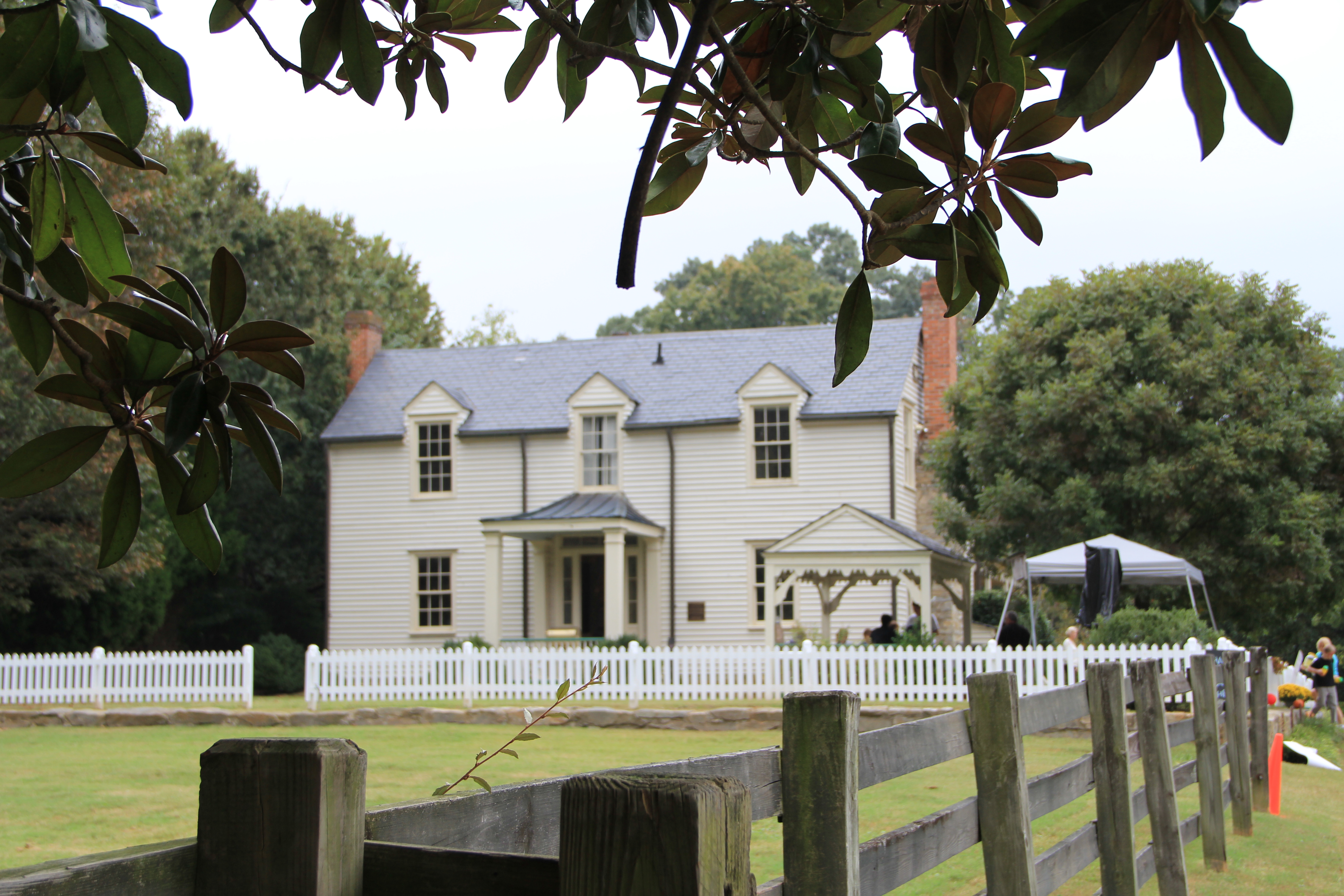

- Location within Metro Atlanta Location within Georgia Location within the United States
- Location: 4831 Chamblee-Dunwoody Rd., near Dunwoody, Georgia
- Coordinates: 33°55′58″N 84°19′02″W
- Area: 2.8 acres (1.1 ha)
- Built: c.1870
- Architect: Francis Palmer Smith
- Architectural style: Colonial Revival
- NRHP reference No.: 09000585
- Added to NRHP: August 9, 2009

The Donaldson-Bannister House and Cemetery, near Dunwoody, Georgia, is a historic property that was listed on the National Register of Historic Places in 2009. The house has also been known as Chesnut House.

The listing included six contributing buildings, a contributing structure, and a contributing site, on 2.8 acres (1.1 ha).

The house was built c. 1870 for William J. Donaldson as a Plantation Plain-type building, and a rear ell was added in the 1880s. In 1935, the ell was changed considerably by owner Lois Patillo Bannister, who hired architect Francis Palmer Smith to implement changes consistent with then-popular 20th-century Colonial Revival style.

The house itself is considered significant as an "excellent example of the thorough application of Colonial Revival-style elements". The cemetery is also considered an "excellent example of a family cemetery" in rural agricultural landscape architecture.
