= Mary Ann Harris Gay =

American poet

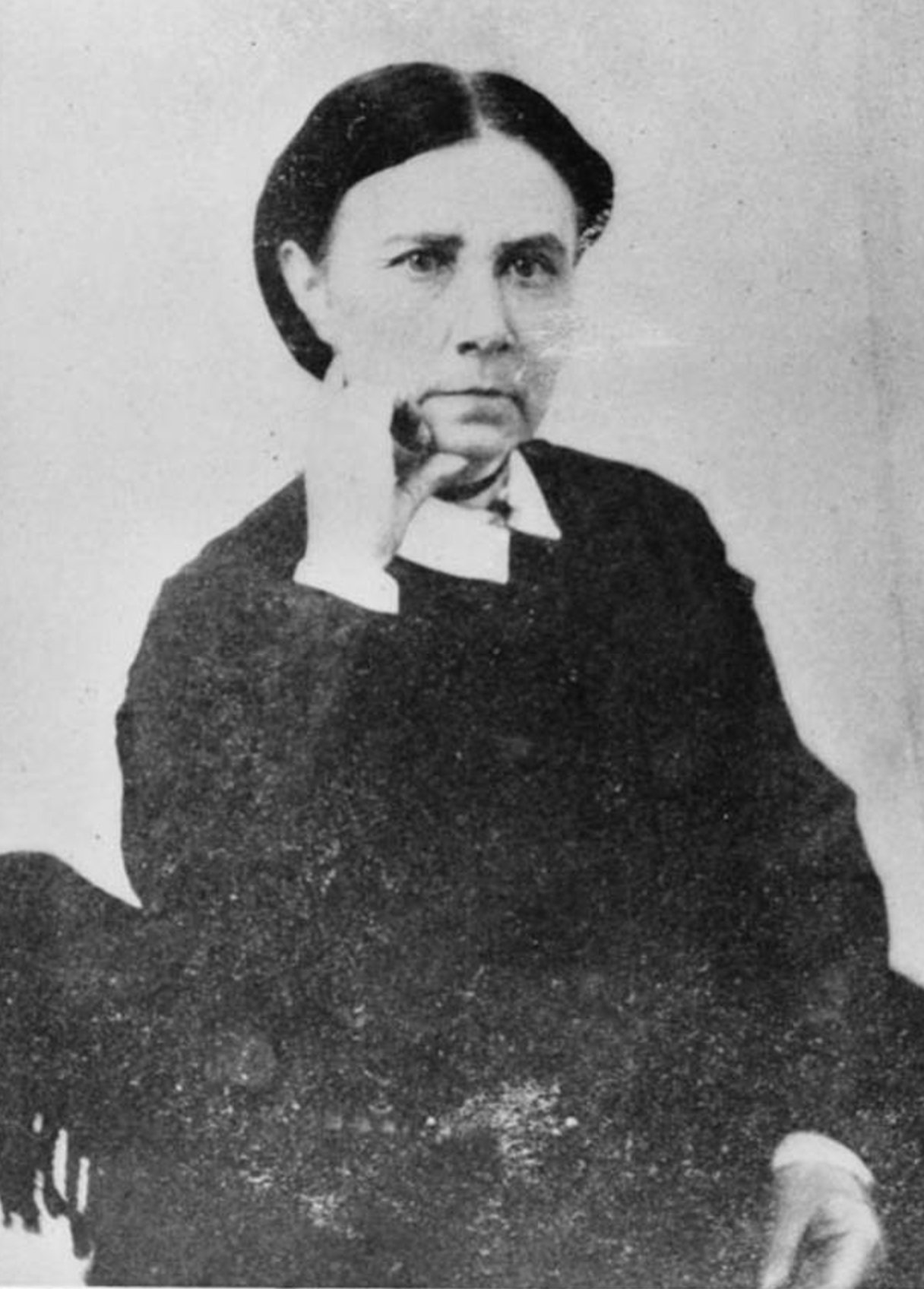
- Born: March 18, 1829; Jones County, Georgia, US
- Died: November 21, 1918 (aged 89); Milledgeville, Georgia, US
- Burial place: Decatur Cemetery; 33.777917°N 84.291405°W
- Occupations: Writer, poet
- Known for: Life in Dixie During the War
- Relatives: Missouri H. Stokes (half-sister)

Mary Ann Harris Gay (March 18, 1829 – November 21, 1918) was an American writer and poet from Decatur, Georgia, known for her memoir Life in Dixie During the War (1897) about her life in Atlanta during the American Civil War. Author Margaret Mitchell said Gay's memoir inspired some passages in her novel Gone with the Wind (1936). Gay also published a book of poetry in 1858, which she republished after the war to raise money to help support her mother and sister.

Gay was a supporter of the Confederacy, and after the end of the war, was active in efforts to preserve Confederate battlefields and construct Confederate monuments and cemeteries. Gay raised thousands of dollars to pay for a fence and gate at the newly established McGavock Confederate Cemetery in 1866 in Franklin, Tennessee. Her brother was among the nearly 2,000 Confederate soldiers reinterred there from temporary battlefield graves.

In 1997, Gay was named a Georgia Woman of Achievement. The Mary Gay House, her home during and after the Civil War, has been preserved in downtown Decatur. It is listed on the National Register of Historic Places.

== Biography ==
Mary Ann Gay was born to William and Mary (Stevens) Gay on March 18, 1829, in Jones County, Georgia. Shortly after Mary Ann was born, her father died. Her newly widowed mother moved with her children back to her family near Milledgeville, Georgia. They lived in the house of Mary Gay's grandfather, Thomas Stevens, a planter and slave owner. He was criticized in the slave narrative A Slave Life in Georgia (1854) by John Brown, a man who had been enslaved by Stevens before escaping and settling in England.

Stevens also owned property around the state, including in DeKalb County, where he became active in politics by 1829. In the 1830s, Gay and her mother moved to Decatur. There, Gay's mother married lawyer Joseph Stokes, whose clients included Gay's father and brothers. The family moved out to Cassville, Georgia, and Mary Stokes had two more children with Joseph: Thomas (Thomie) J. Stokes (b. 1837) and Missouria Horton Stokes (b. 1838). Mary Stokes' father Thomas Stevens lived with them. By his bequest, Mary Gay was educated at a girls' school in Nashville.

When Stokes died in 1850, Gay's newly widowed mother moved with her three children to a house on Marshall Street in Decatur, Georgia. Gay lived in this house throughout Civil War. She published her first poetry collection anonymously in 1858, at age 29.

During the Civil War, Mary Gay was a supporter of the Confederacy and refused to leave her house when Union Army soldiers took over the area. Gen. Kenner Garrard occupied her house at one point, and his troops camped in her yard. Her only brother, Thomas Stokes, served under Gen. John Bell Hood in the Confederate Army and died in the Battle of Franklin in late 1864.

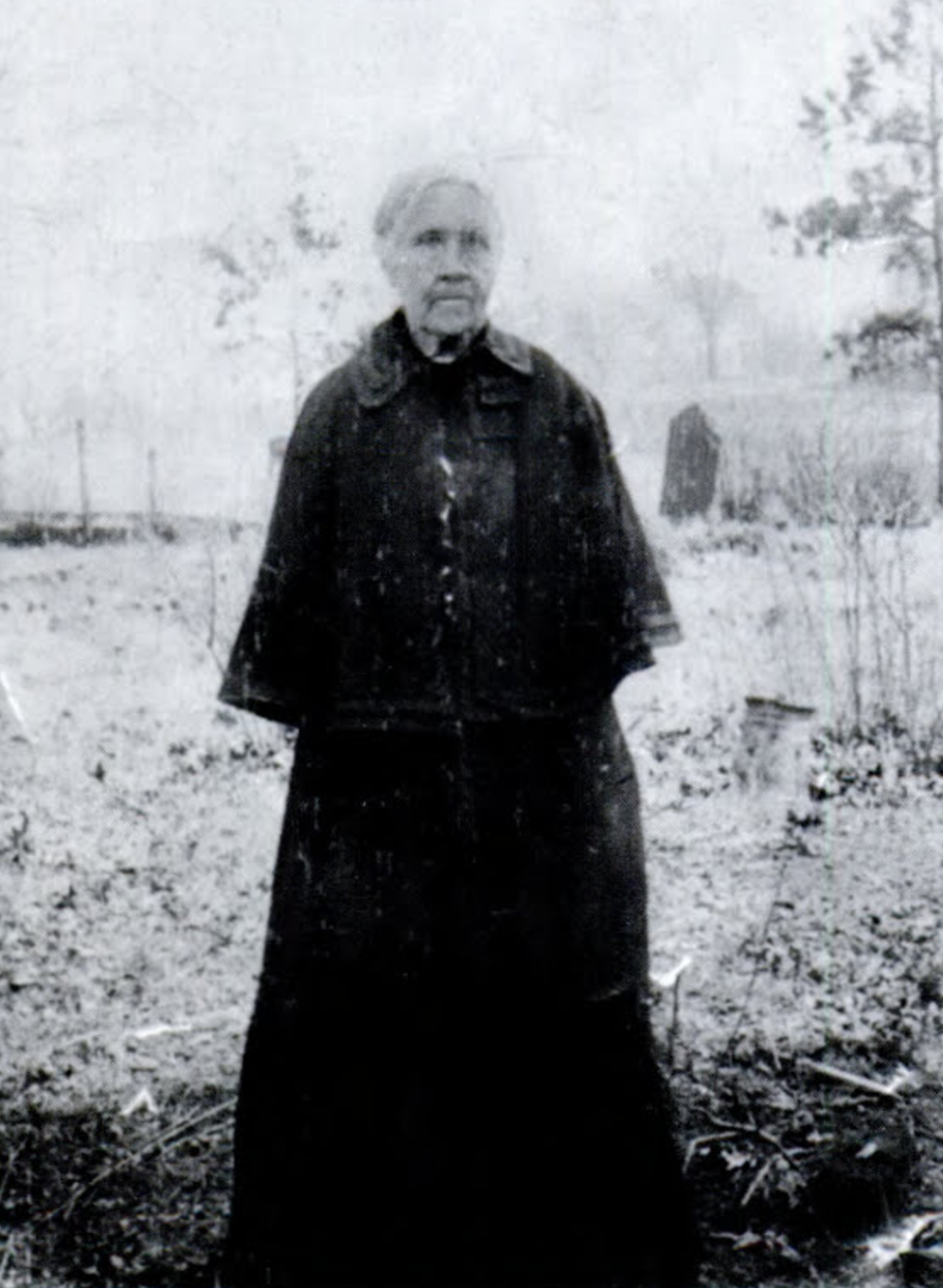
Mary Gay later in life

After the war, Gay worked to preserve Confederate battlefields and erect Confederate monuments. She also helped raise funds for the construction of a new building for the local Baptist church in Decatur.

Gay also helped raise funds for the establishment of McGavock Confederate Cemetery to accommodate the reburial of the 1,750 Confederate soldiers who died at the Battle of Franklin, including her brother. The funds were enough to enclose the cemetery with an iron fence and gate, which was marked with a plaque with her name. She also successfully campaigned for a memorial to Alexander H. Stephens at his grave at Liberty Hall.

Gay reprinted her book Prose and Poetry (1858) after the war and marketed it "aggressively" in order to support her family. The book came to the attention of Mark Twain, who quoted it "with disdain" in Chapter 21 of The Adventures of Tom Sawyer (1876). He wrote that Gay's work was "after the school-girl pattern."

In 1892, Gay published Life in Dixie During the War based on her memories, her half-sister Missouria's journal, and letters from her half-brother Thomas. Covering the years from 1861 through 1865, it became her best-known work. It influenced Margaret Mitchell's novel Gone With the Wind (1936), with some scenes being drawn "directly from Gay's memoir".

Gay also wrote a novel, The Transplanted: A Story of Dixie Before the War (1907), with an introduction by Walter Neale, the New York publisher. It opens in the 1840s on a Mississippi plantation owned by a man of Scots descent.

Historians have explored the important role of planter and middle-class women in creating the memory and history of the American Civil War. For instance, the United Daughters of the Confederacy had organized, initially to raise funds to get the Confederate dead decently buried in cemeteries. They also raised money to erect monuments to the war and their dead. In addition, by the late 19th century, its leaders encouraged Southern women such as Gay to publish their memoirs and other writings about the war, in order to perpetuate the myth of the Lost Cause of the Confederacy, which denies that slavery was a central cause of the Civil War.

Gay never married. After the death of her sister Missouria in 1910, Gay began to suffer from dementia in her old age. She was committed to the Georgia State Sanitarium in 1915, where she died on November 21, 1918. She is buried in Decatur Cemetery.

== Honors ==
In 1997 Gay was inducted into the Georgia Women of Achievement Hall of Fame. Her home in Decatur has been preserved as the Mary Gay House and is listed on the National Register of Historic Places.

== Works ==
- Gay, Mary A. H. (1907). The Transplanted: A Story of Dixie Before the War. New York: The Neale Pub. Co. OCLC 1722413 – via Library of Congress.
- Gay, Mary A. H. (1892). Life in Dixie During the War: 1861-1862-1863-1864-1865. Atlanta, Ga: C.P. Byrd. OCLC 11404789 – via Internet Archive.
- Gay, Mary A. H. (1859). Prose and Poetry. Nashville: South-Western Pub. House. OCLC 1979024 – via Google Books.
