= Brookhaven Historic District =

Historic district in Georgia, United States

- U.S. National Register of Historic Places
- Location within Georgia
- Location: E of Peachtree-Dunwoody Rd. and N and E of Peachtree Rd., Atlanta, Georgia
- Coordinates: 33°51′49″N 84°21′02″W
- Area: 300 acres (120 ha)
- Built: 1910
- Architect: Multiple
- Architectural style: Late 19th And 20th Century Revivals
- NRHP reference No.: 86000134
- Added to NRHP: January 24, 1986

The Brookhaven Historic District in Atlanta, Georgia is a 300 acres (120 ha) historic district which was listed on the National Register of Historic Places in 1986. The listing included 202 contributing buildings and two contributing structures.

It is located east of Peachtree-Dunwoody Road and north and east of Peachtree Road. It spans across the border of DeKalb County and Fulton County.

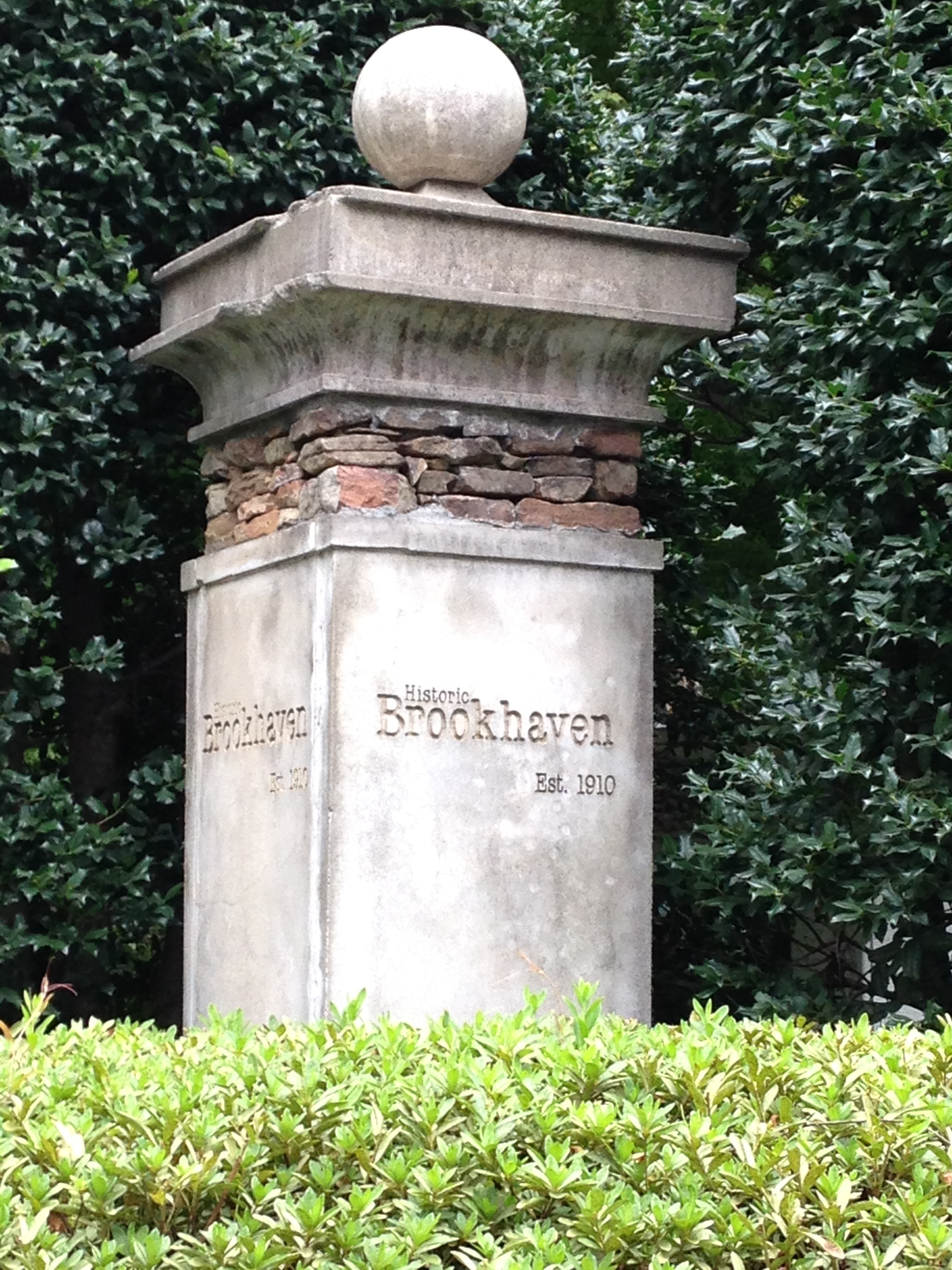
Marker

It is a residential area laid out and developed beginning in 1910.
