= Mary Gay House =

Historic house in Georgia, United States

- U.S. National Register of Historic Places
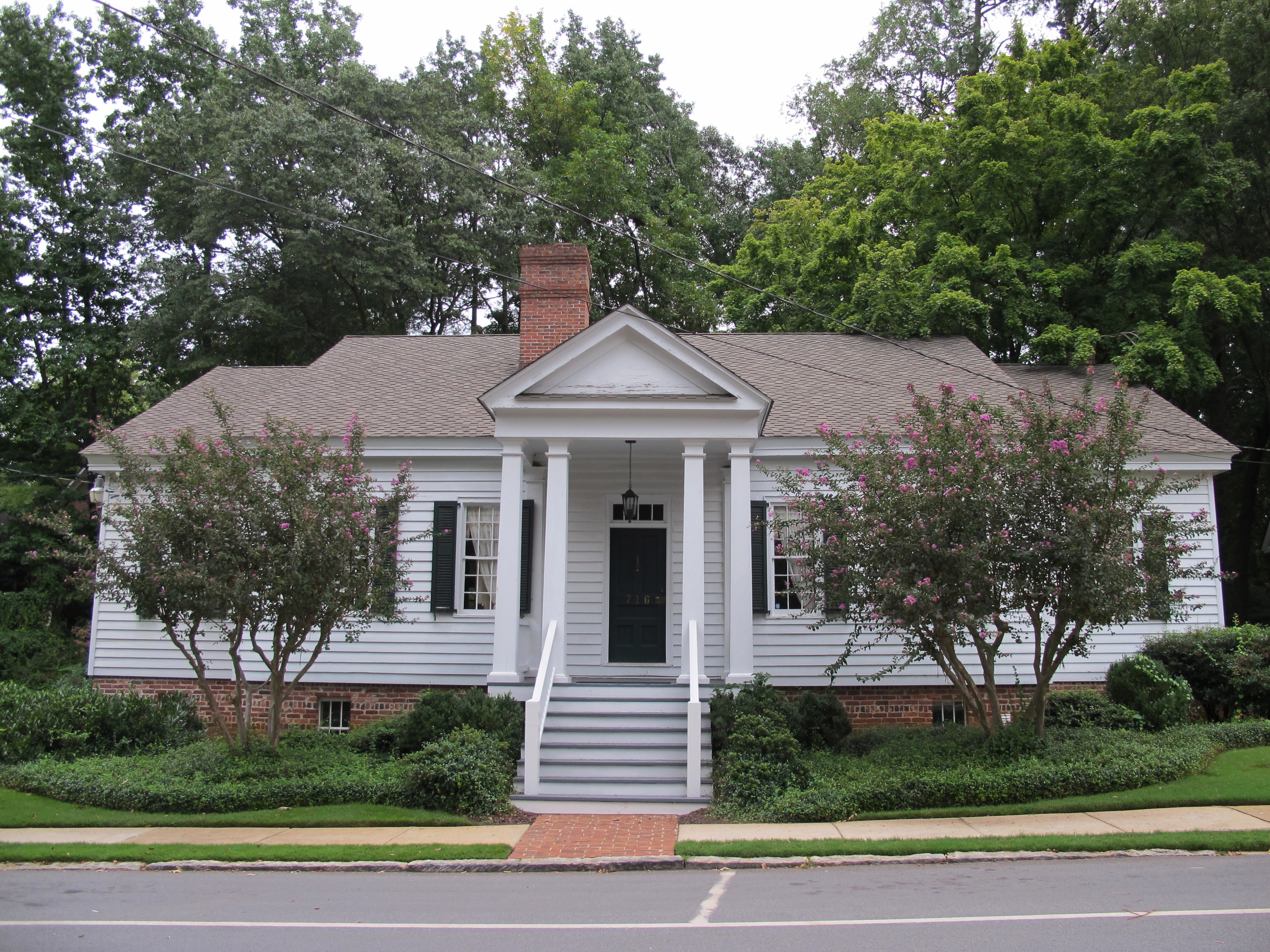

- Location within Atlanta Location within Georgia Location within the United States
- Location: 716 West Trinity Place, Decatur, Georgia
- Coordinates: 33.772662°N 84.304532°W
- Built: c. 1850
- Architectural style: Classical
- NRHP reference No.: 75002072
- Added to NRHP: May 6, 1975

The Mary Gay House is a historic house at 716 West Trinity Place in downtown Decatur, Georgia. It was the home of Mary Ann Harris Gay, who moved there with her mother and sister about 1850. She and her sister lived there during the American Civil War and afterwards. The house was built approximately 1850 (though the Junior League of Decatur claims it was built about 1820) and is one of the few extant pre-Civil War buildings in the area. The house was entered into the National Register of Historic Places (NRHP) on May 6, 1975. It is now named "716 West" and is used as a wedding/event venue.

== History ==
The house has been moved at least twice. In the early twentieth century, it was moved eastward and oriented to face Marshall Street. While still at this location (524 Marshall St.), it was listed on the NRHP.

In the late 1970s development in Decatur threatened the structure. While it originally was located on "several acres" of land, by 1979 the house was on a 100 foot by 200 foot (1,800 square meters) lot, bordered mostly by businesses and accessible only by a narrow street with no nearby parking.

The Junior League of DeKalb County preserved the structure by arranging to have it moved to its current location at 716 West Trinity Place. This location was less than a mile away in Adair Park and immediately adjacent to the historic Swanton House (which had also been moved). The group also successfully petitioned the NRHP for the Gay house to retain its historic status after the move.

Since restoration, the basement of the house has been used as the headquarters for the Junior League. The house is operated as an event facility for receptions, parties, weddings, and similar events. In 2022, because Mary Gay is considered a "Confederate heroine" the Junior League voted to rename their headquarters and wedding venue "716 West".

== See also ==
- National Register of Historic Places listings in DeKalb County, Georgia
