= Lithonia, Georgia =

- City
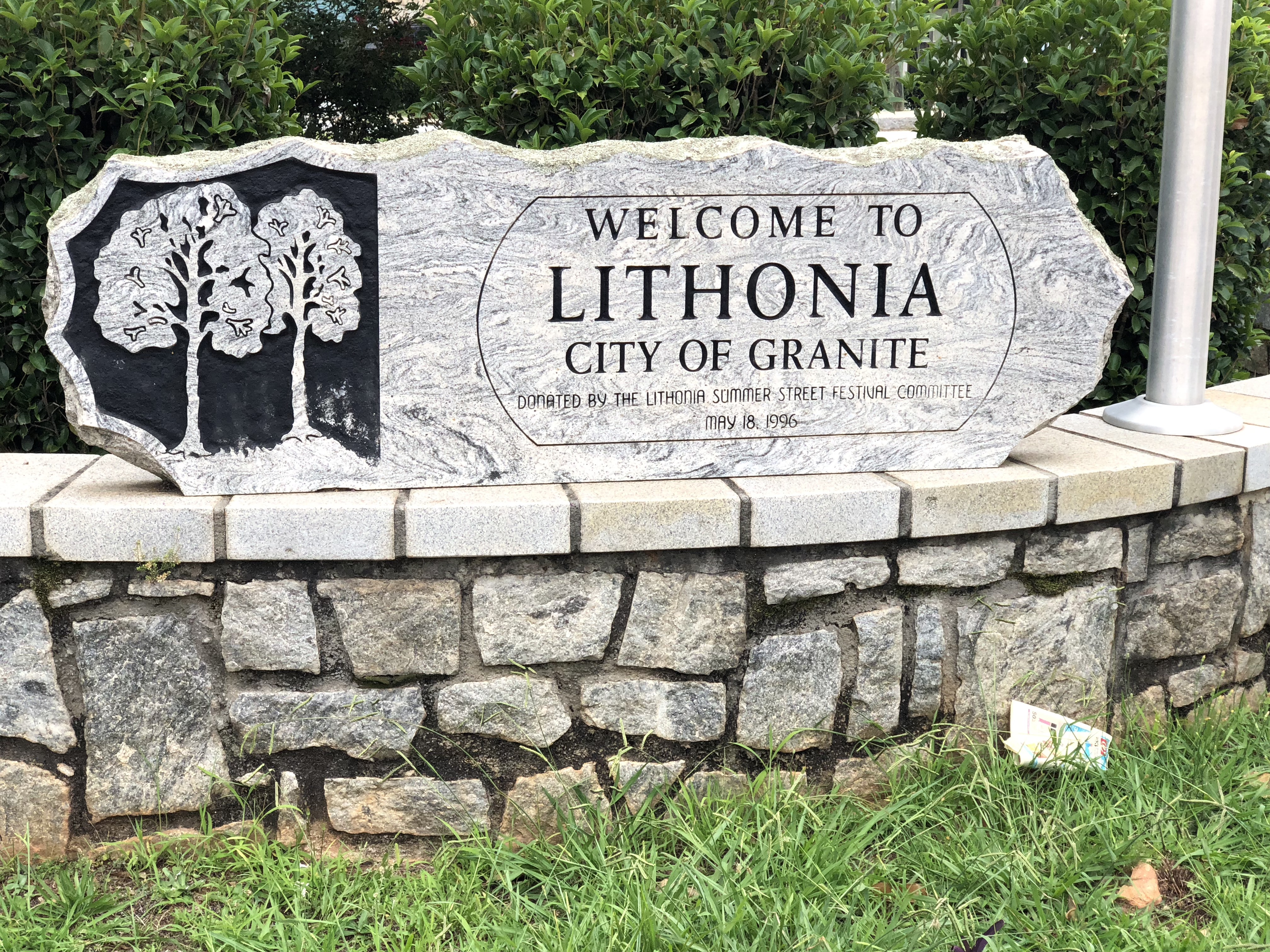
- Welcome sign on Main Street in Lithonia

- Seal
- Motto: City of Granite
- Location in DeKalb County and the state of Georgia

- Location in the Atlanta metropolitan area
- Coordinates: 33°42′46″N 84°6′21″W
- Country: United States
- State: Georgia
- County: DeKalb

Government
  - Mayor: Shameka Reynolds
  - DeKalb County CEO: Lorraine Cochran-Johnson

Area
  - Total: 0.93 sq mi (2.41 km^{2})
  - Land: 0.93 sq mi (2.40 km^{2})
  - Water: 0 sq mi (0.00 km^{2})
- Elevation: 925 ft (282 m)

Population (2020)
  - Total: 2,662
  - Density: 2,869.1/sq mi (1,107.78/km^{2})
- Time zone: UTC-5 (Eastern (EST))
  - Summer (DST): UTC-4 (EDT)
- ZIP codes: 30038, 30058
- Area codes: 770, 678
- FIPS code: 13-46860
- GNIS feature ID: 0325978
- Website: www.lithoniacity.org

Lithonia (/lɪˈθoʊniə/ lih-THOH-nee-ə, AAVE: /laɪ-/ ly-) is a city in eastern DeKalb County, Georgia, United States. The city's population was 2,662 at the 2020 census. Lithonia is in the Atlanta metropolitan area.

"Lithonia" means "city/town of stone". Lithonia is in the heart of the Georgian granite-quarrying and viewing region, hence the name of the town, from the Greek lithos, for “stone”. The huge nearby Stone Mountain is composed of granite, while the Lithonia gneiss is a form of metamorphic rock. The Stone Mountain granite is younger than, and has intruded the Lithonia gneiss. The area has a history of rock quarries. The mines were served by the Georgia Railroad and Atlanta, Stone Mountain & Lithonia Railway. Some of the rock quarries have been converted to parkland, and the rail lines to rail-trail.

Lithonia is one of the gateways to the Arabia Mountain National Heritage Area, which is largely contained inside Stonecrest, Georgia.

== Geography ==
Lithonia is located in southeastern DeKalb County at 33°42′46″N 84°6′21″W (33.712658, -84.105897). Interstate 20 passes just south of the community, with access from Exits 74 and 75. Lithonia is 18 miles (29 km) east of the center of Atlanta. Some areas in extreme southern Gwinnett County use a Lithonia postal address near the county line.

According to the United States Census Bureau, the city has a total area of 0.89 square miles (2.3 km^{2}), all land.

== History ==
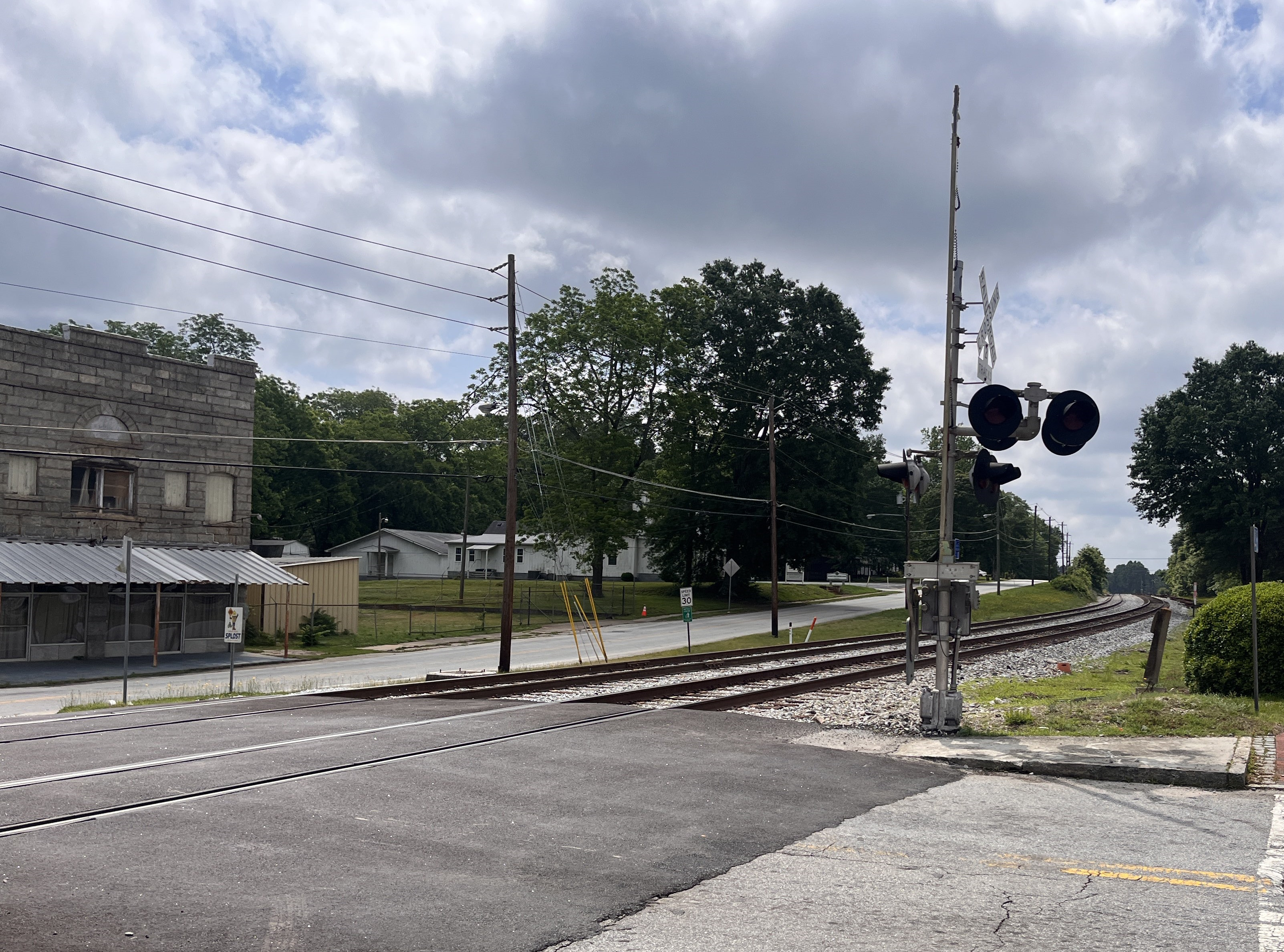
Railroad tracks in Lithonia, near the Collinsville area

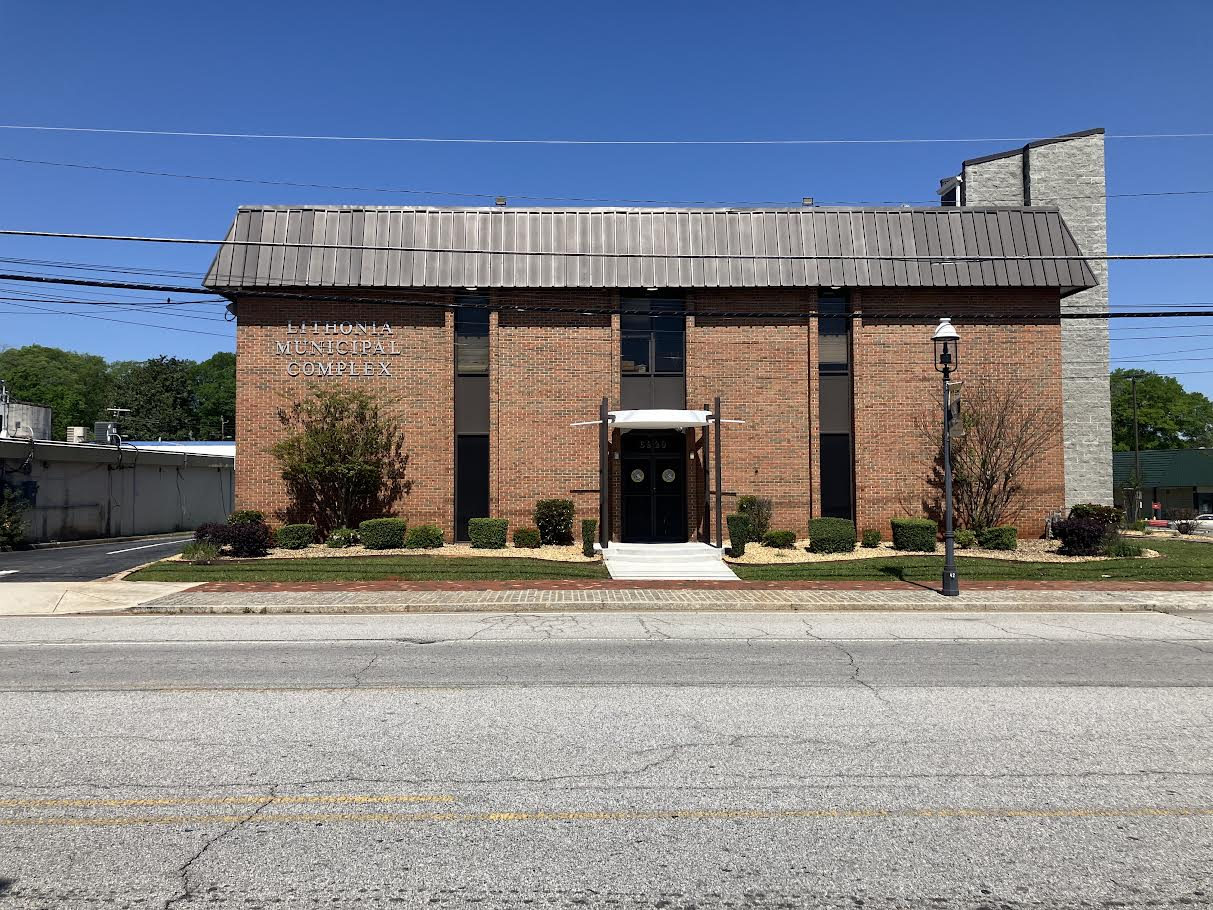
Lithonia Municipal Complex (April 2025)

In 1805, Lithonia began as a small crossroads settlement of farmers. The town grew with the coming of the Atlanta Augusta Railroad in 1845, which allowed the granite quarrying industry in the area to flourish.

Lithonia is the birthplace of the Lithonia Lighting company, one of North America's largest manufacturers of commercial, institutional, industrial and residential light fixtures, which was founded in the city in 1946 but moved to nearby Conyers in the 1950s.

== Lithonia Historic District ==
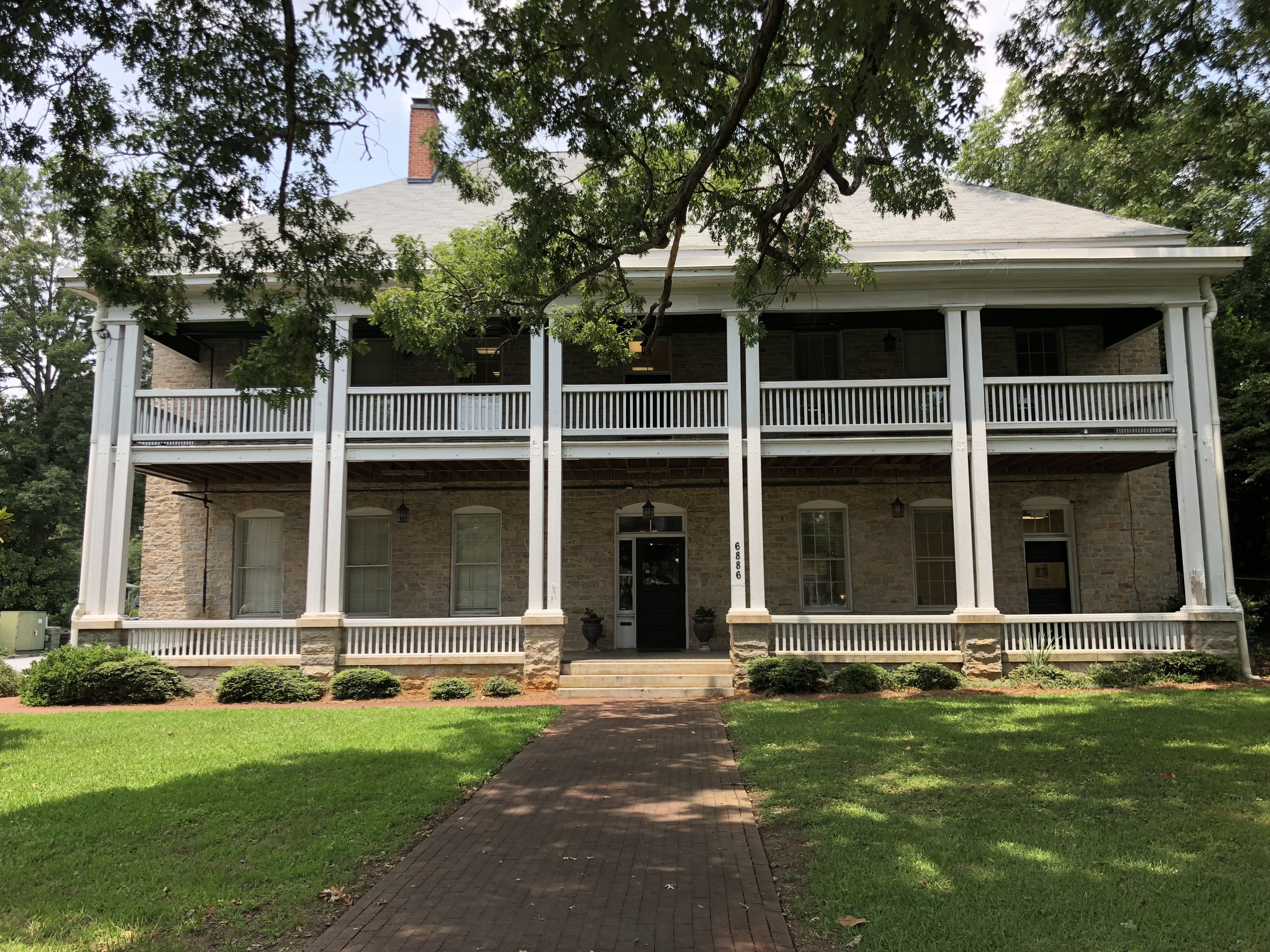
The Seminary (1895)

- Lithonia Historic District
- U.S. National Register of Historic Places
- U.S. Historic district
- Area: 441 acres (178 ha)
- NRHP reference No.: 16000639
- Added to NRHP: September 19, 2016

The Lithonia Historic District consists of a commercial core surrounded by residential areas, with a period of significance spanning from 1845 to 1964. Stylistic influences in the district include Second Empire, Queen Anne, Folk Victorian, Neoclassical Revival, English Vernacular Revival, Craftsman, and Colonial Revival. The district is bisected by the Georgia/CSX Railroad, which runs perpendicular to the historic commercial core's primary thoroughfare, Main Street. The commercial area extends south from the intersection of Main Street and the railroad, covering a two-block area. The commercial buildings are primarily brick and local granite masonry, with little decorative detailing. Commercial styles include single retail, multiple retail, and retail and office types. Within the historic district, there is some non-historic infill construction such as the 1968 Lithonia Plaza shopping center.

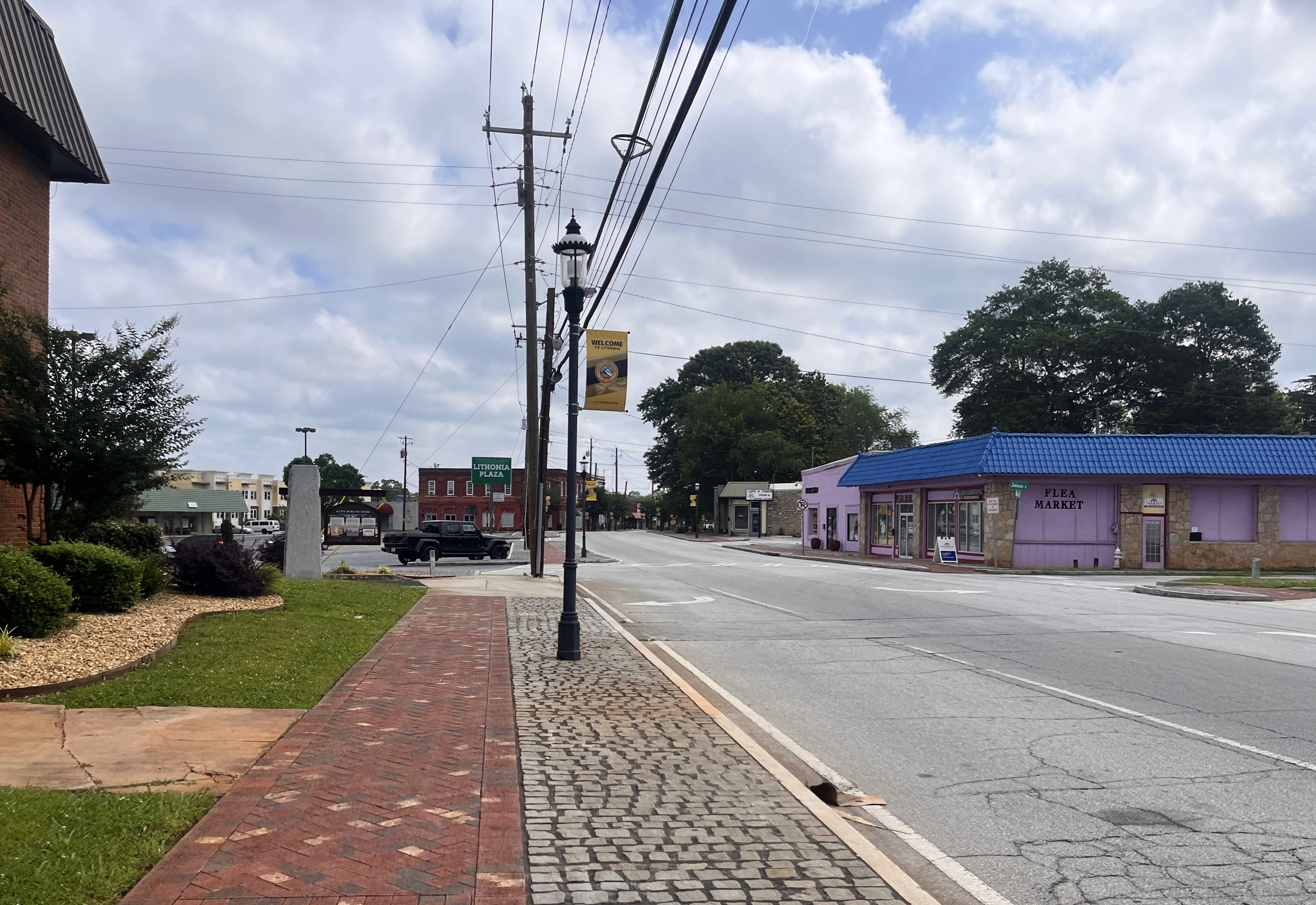
Main Street in Lithonia, with shops visible along the side of the road

The residential areas contain architecture typical of late 19th- to mid 20th-century types and styles. Residential neighborhoods also feature locally quarried granite and gneiss. House types and styles include the central hall Georgian cottage, gabled-wing cottage, Queen Anne cottage, New South cottage, pyramidal cottage, bungalow, Ranch house, I-House and Queen Anne house.

Landmark properties include the Masonic Lodge (1916), The Lithonia Women's Club (1928), the Lithonia First United Methodist Church (1910), Antioch Baptist Church (1911), Lithonia Presbyterian Church, The Union Missionary Church (1911), the Bruce Street equalization school (c.1953), and The Seminary (1895). Contributing sites in the district include two cemeteries, two parks, the former Georgia Railroad Quarry, and the ruins of the Bruce Street School for African-Americans (1938).

The district is significant under National Register criterion A (association with historic events) and C (architecture), with areas of significance in Architecture, Black and European Ethnic Heritage, Community Planning and Development, Industry, and Transportation.

== Demographics ==
Historical population
Census	Pop.	Note	%±
1880	266		—
1890	1,182		344.4%
1900	1,208		2.2%
1910	1,428		18.2%
1920	1,269		−11.1%
1930	1,457		14.8%
1940	1,554		6.7%
1950	1,538		−1.0%
1960	1,667		8.4%
1970	2,270		36.2%
1980	2,637		16.2%
1990	2,448		−7.2%
2000	2,187		−10.7%
2010	1,924		−12.0%
2020	2,662		38.4%
2025 (est.)	2,608	▼	−2.0%
U.S. Decennial Census; 1850-1870 1870-1880; 1890-1910 1920-1930; 1940 1950 1960; 1970 1980 1990; 2000 2010; 2025

=== 2020 census ===
As of the 2020 census, Lithonia had a population of 2,662. The median age was 31.2 years. 29.9% of residents were under the age of 18, and 11.3% were age 65 or older. For every 100 females, there were 76.6 males, and for every 100 females age 18 and over, there were 70.3 males.

100.0% of residents lived in urban areas, while 0.0% lived in rural areas.

There were 1,007 households in the city, of which 43.7% had children under the age of 18 living in them. Of all households, 17.0% were married-couple households, 20.0% were households with a male householder and no spouse or partner present, and 52.4% were households with a female householder and no spouse or partner present. About 30.7% of all households were made up of individuals, and 8.9% had someone living alone who was 65 years of age or older.

There were 1,100 housing units, of which 8.5% were vacant. The homeowner vacancy rate was 4.2%, and the rental vacancy rate was 7.0%.

Lithonia racial composition as of 2020
Race	Num.	Perc.
White (non-Hispanic)	128	4.81%
Black or African American (non-Hispanic)	2,212	83.1%
Native American	3	0.11%
Asian	18	0.68%
Other/Mixed	98	3.68%
Hispanic or Latino	203	7.63%

== Hospitals ==
The three main health facilities in Lithonia are:

- Emory Hillandale Hospital is the newest hospital in DeKalb.
- Kaiser Permanente runs two community health clinics in Lithonia: Panola Road Clinic, and the Stonecrest Clinic.
- East DeKalb Health Center

== Education ==
DeKalb County Public Schools operates public schools. Lithonia Middle School is the only school located in the city limits of Lithonia.

The schools that serve the city limits of Lithonia are: Stoneview Elementary School in Stonecrest, Lithonia Middle School, and Lithonia High School in Stonecrest (formerly Redan CDP).

=== Universities ===
- Strayer University

=== Public libraries ===
DeKalb County Public Library operates the Lithonia-Davidson Library the main library source in Lithonia, which was once privately owned until being incorporated into the DeKalb County Public Library system in 1947.

== Transportation ==
MARTA (Metropolitan Atlanta Rapid Transit Authority) provides connecting bus service to and from Lithonia, and GRTA Xpress (Georgia Rapid Transit Authority) provides commuter bus service to downtown Atlanta from a community park and ride lot.

== Notable people ==
- Kevin Byard III, professional football defensive back in the National Football League (NFL).
- Hank Johnson, U.S. representative for Georgia's 4th congressional district, former DeKalb County commissioner and associate magistrate judge
- Broderick Jones, professional football offensive tackle in the National Football League.
- Jakobi Meyers, professional football wide receiver in the National Football League.

== In popular culture ==
The city was the title subject of the 2024 Childish Gambino song of the same name, "Lithonia".

Lithonia was also utilized in the 1977 film Smokey and the Bandit, starring Burt Reynolds, Jerry Reed, Jackie Gleason, and Sally Field.
