= Northwoods Historic District =

Historic district in Georgia, United States

- U.S. National Register of Historic Places
- U.S. Historic district
- Location within Metro Atlanta Location within Georgia Location within the United States
- Location: DeKalb County, Georgia
- Coordinates: 33°53′30″N 84°16′35″W
- NRHP reference No.: 14000322
- Added to NRHP: June 2, 2014

The Northwoods Historic District in DeKalb County, Georgia, consists of five adjoining residential neighborhoods, including Northwoods, Fleetwood Hills, Gordon Hills, Gordon Heights and Sequoyah Woods. The Northwoods, Gordon Hills and Gordon Heights neighborhoods are all located within the city limits of Doraville, Georgia, and Sequoyah Woods and Fleetwood Hills are located in unincorporated DeKalb County. The district was developed in the 1950s and 60's and consists of approximately 530 acres with a total of 922 historic/contributing resources.

On June 2, 2014, the Northwoods Historic District was added to the National Register of Historic Places. The district is significant because it is an intact example of midcentury and contemporary architecture in Georgia. The district was developed to provide affordable homes that met VA and FHA requirements and other amenities for middle-class workers in nearby industries, including the General Motors automobile factory Doraville Assembly, Delta, Lockheed and others.

As a planned use development, the district serves as an early example of a mixed-use development, with schools, churches, offices and homes all located within the district. The Northwoods Area Neighborhood Association sponsored the nomination for recognition, and the Heritage Preservation Program at Georgia State University prepared the nomination materials and conducted the supporting research, interviews and community meetings as well as gathered and preserved a number of historic documents and pictures. The Northwoods Area Neighborhood Association has served the district for over 50 years of its history and continues to do so today by providing a sense of community for Northwoods and the surrounding areas.

On October 10, 2019, the US Board of Geographic names approved names for two creeks based on an application from the Northwoods Area Neighborhood Association and with the support of the City of Doraville. The first is Northwoods Creek, which is named for the Northwoods Historic District. The second is Stewart Creek, which is named for Stewart Lake, which was formed in an old rock quarry dug during the Great Depression by workers with the Works Progress Administration. While the lake is no longer there, it seems appropriate that the creek bear its name.

== Architecture ==
After initially developing some plain style ranches in the south-western portion of the district, the primary developer of Northwoods, Walter Talley, hired Georgia Tech architects Ernest Mastin and John Summer to design a variety of contemporary homes and floor plans. When switching from the plain style ranch house to the more contemporary designs, Tally was initially met with skepticism from lenders. The Providence Institute for Savings made one of the initial loans to Tally, but required that Tally build five conventional houses along with five of the more original contemporary houses designed by Mastin and Summer to limit the lender's perceived risk. With strong demand for the contemporary designs, lenders soon gave Tally the flexibility he needed to develop Northwoods using a variety of contemporary designs. This focus on both design and cost are clearly reflected in an early advertisement promoting "Houses of Smart Design and Superior Constructions" in Northwoods for prices between $13,350 and $15,300 (a median price of $172,000 in 2025 dollars).

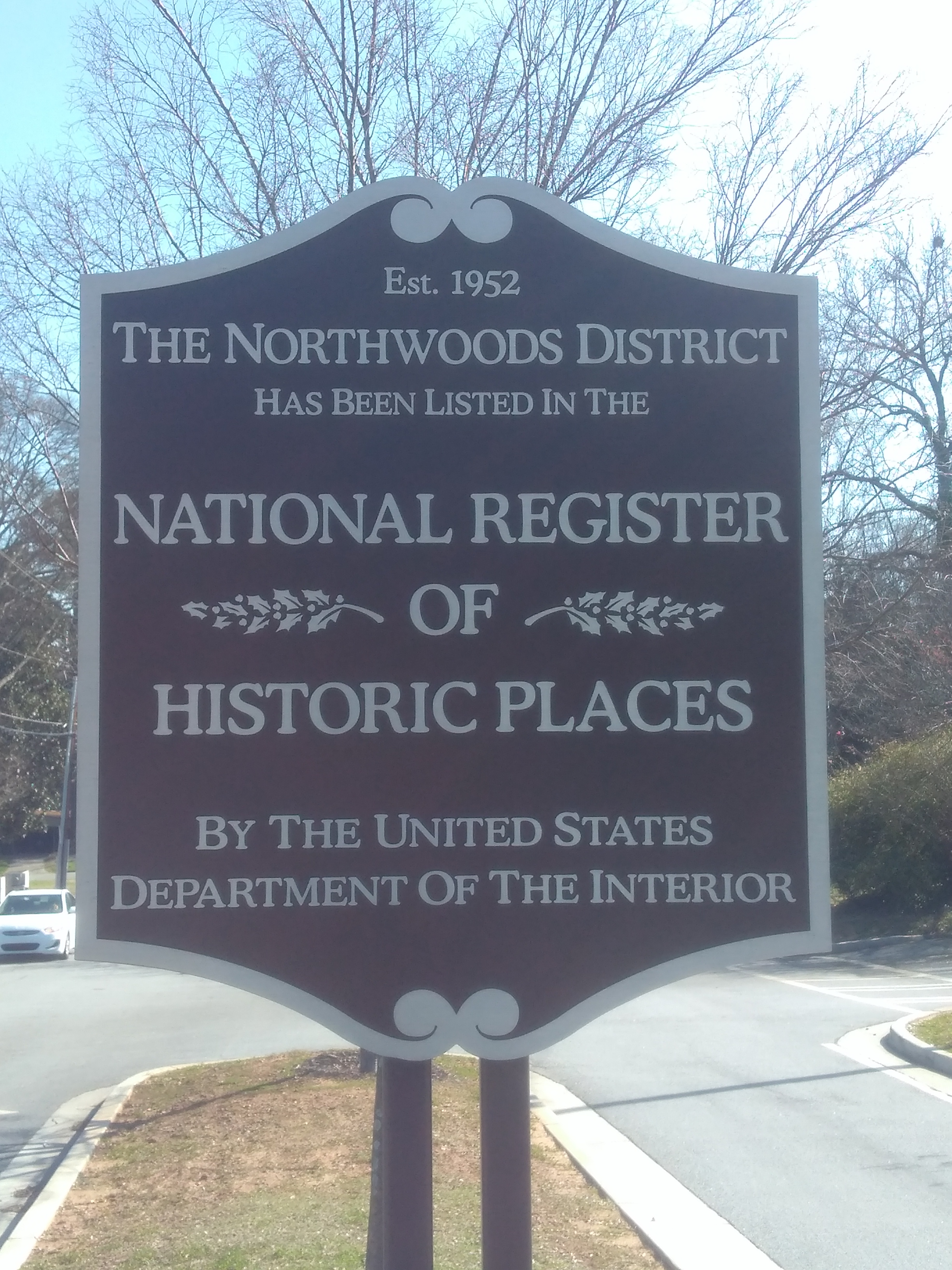
McClave Dr. Historic Sign

Tally, Mastin and Summer used contemporary and mid-century modern design features to ensure both the affordable pricing and the high quality that appealed to DeKalb County's burgeoning middle class. Mastin and Summer drew significant inspiration from contemporary designs in California, and they found ways to incorporate many contemporary design features into the district's modest homes. One notable and unique architectural feature in the district is the use of brick from the foundation up to the window sills of many homes with other materials from the window sills to the roofline. This feature was designed to balance buyers' desire for brick with the goal of affordability.

With designs inspired by the successful Northwoods neighborhood, the other neighborhoods in the district (Gordon Hills, Gordon Heights, Sequoyah Woods and Fleetwood Hills) are generally consistent in design and share many of the same architectural features as the Northwoods neighborhood.

== Notable buildings ==
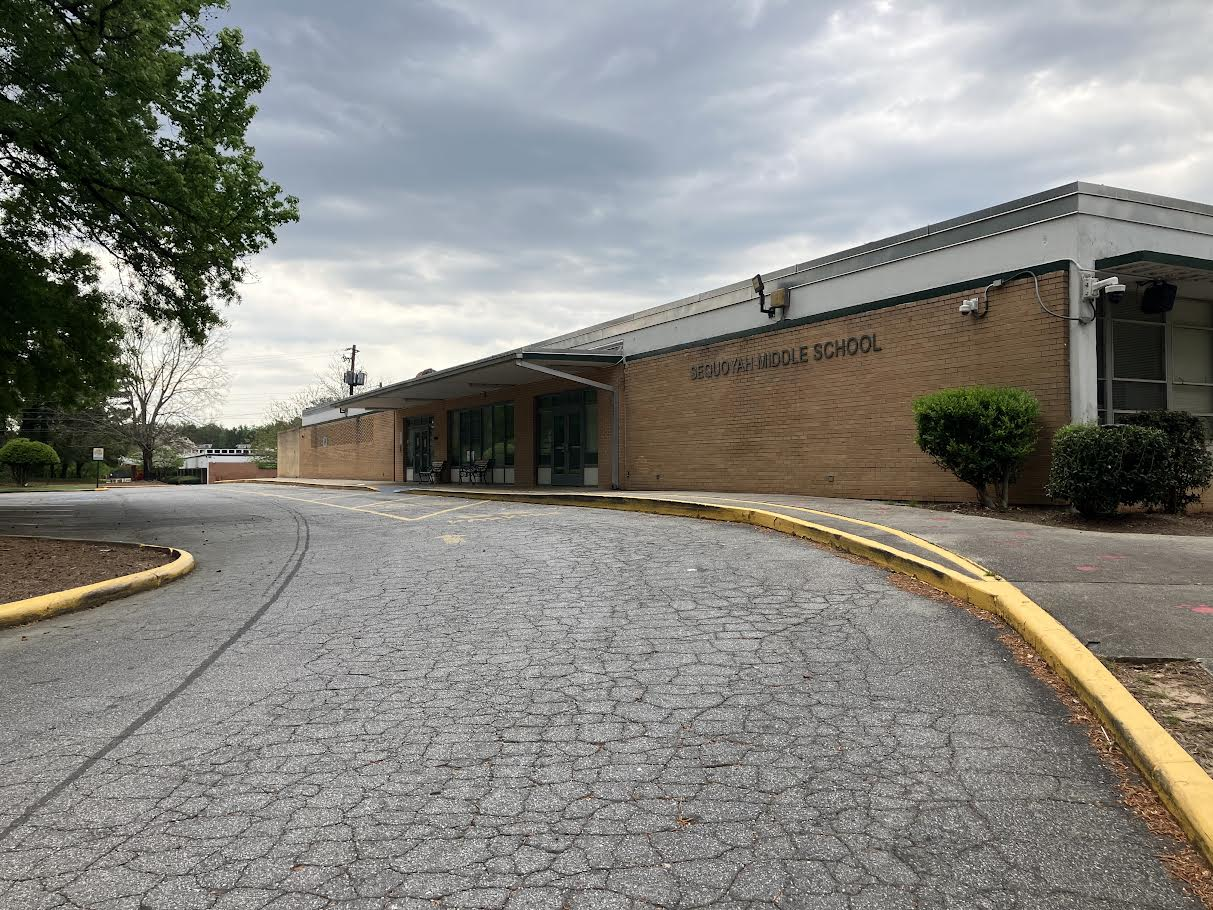
Sequoyah Middle School (April 2025)

The Herb Butler Union Hall located at 5407 Buford Highway served as the home to the United Autoworkers, Local 10 until the closure of General Motors' Doraville Assembly in 2008. Designed by Phillip Windsor, the Herb Butler Union Hall is significant both architecturally and as a tangible reminder of the district's middle-class roots. The hall is named after James Herbert "Herb" Butler (November 4, 1927 – February 21, 2008), one of Local 10's most influential members who served the union for over 50 years.

Renowned architect John C. Portman Jr. together with his associates designed both Sequoyah Middle School (formerly Sequoyah High School) and Cary Reynolds Elementary (formerly Sequoyah Elementary and Northwoods Area Elementary before that). These two schools are located in the Sequoyah Woods neighborhood in the district. The modern design of these two schools showcases some of Portman's early work. Portman later achieved notoriety for his design of Peachtree Center in Atlanta, the Renaissance Building in Detroit, Bonaventure Hotel in Los Angeles and Western Warsaw Hotel in Poland. There is a plaque outside each school recognizing Portman and Associates for their modern designs.

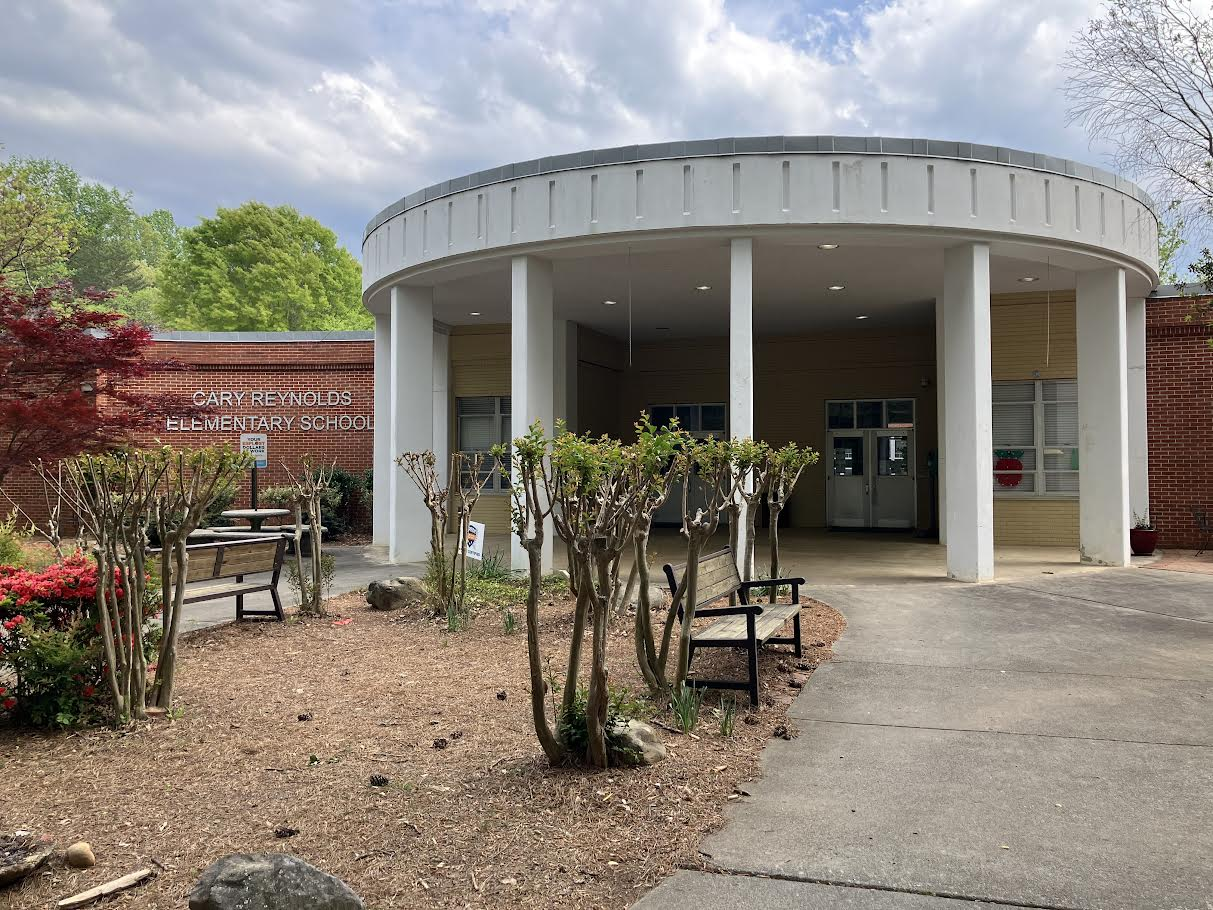
Cary Reynolds Elementary School (April 2025)

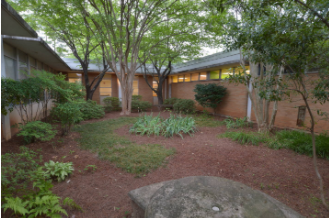
Interior Courtyard at Cary Reynolds Elementary

Cary Reynolds Elementary was recently recognized by the Georgia Trust for Historic Preservation as one of its 2019 Places in Peril. Opened in 1961, the school features several of Portman’s signature stylistic motifs, including the central green space and light wells above the windows. As recognized by the Georgia Trust for Historic Preservation, this building is awaiting long-promised investment and renovations by the DeKalb County School District. Neighborhood advocates are concerned that a failure to invest in needed maintenance will negatively impact students and faculty and jeopardize the long-term impact on the preservation of this architectural treasure.

== Neighborhoods ==
Map of Northwoods Historic District

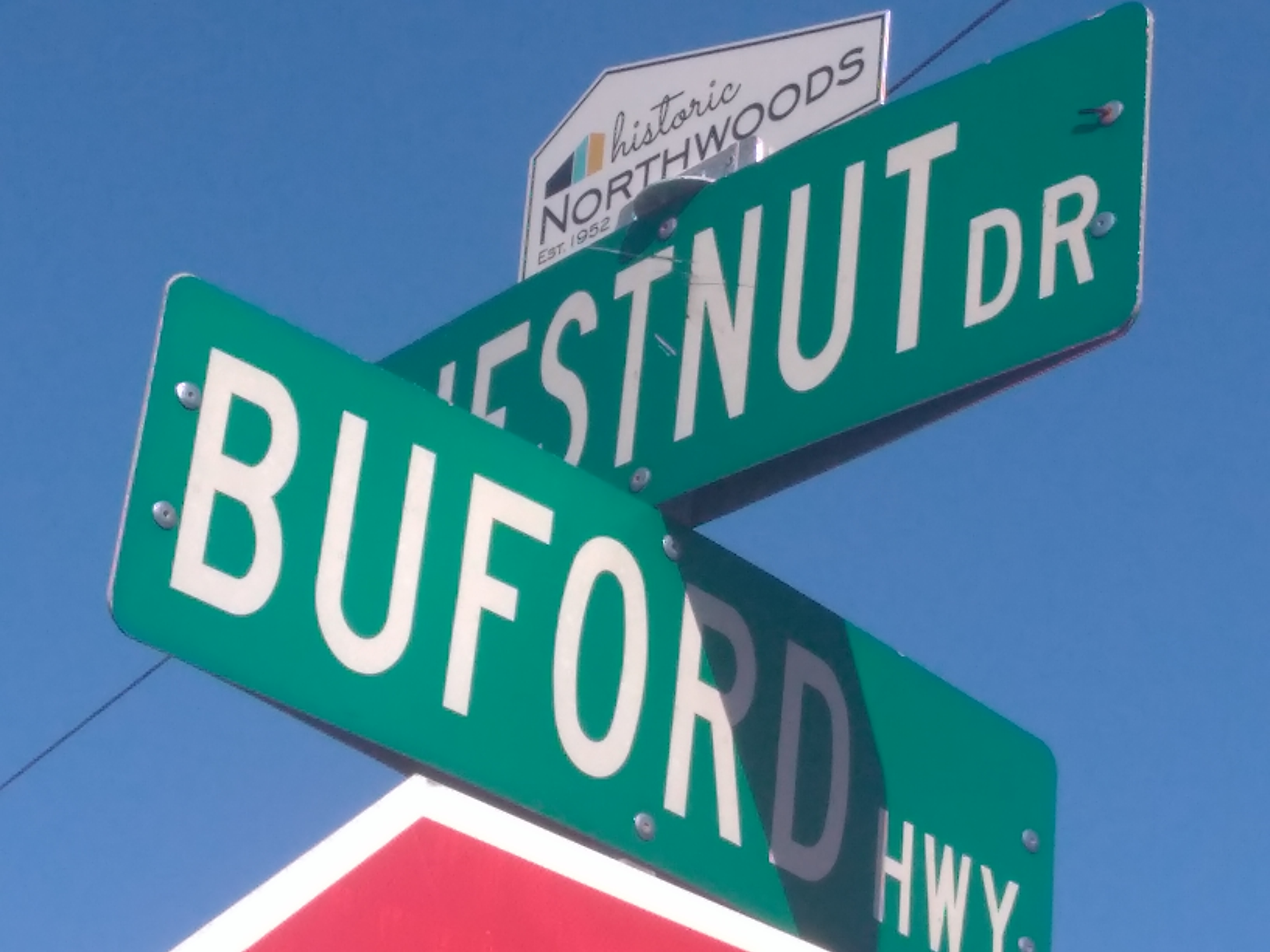
An entrance from Buford Highway

Northwoods is the largest of the five neighborhoods included in the district, and it contains the district's two parks, Brook Park and Autumn Park. Walter Tally's vision for Northwoods was that it would be a "city within a city" that included within it a variety of uses. Unlike many planned neighborhoods today, Northwoods includes seven access points from city streets and county roads. Northwoods was developed in nine different units from 1950 to 1958, with Mastin and Summer responsible for the design of most but not all of the houses. Tally and Summer designed houses for themselves on McClave Dr. Most streets in Northwoods are named after the family members of the developers.

Gordon Hills, Gordon Heights and Sequoyah Woods have their origins in land owned by a farmer named Thomas Turner Stewart. With the passing of Thomas Stewart, John Gordon Stewart and Julia Stewart Strong inherited 160 acres and Marty Teru Creel inherited the remaining 60 acres.

John Gordon Stewart, who served as Mayor of Doraville from the 1920s to the 1950s, began developing Gordon Hills in 1948 with the majority of development occurring in the 1950s. The plans for developing the neighboring Gordon Heights were approved in 1955.

Sequoyah Woods is the newest of the five neighborhoods in the district, with development by James Embry occurring primarily between 1962 and 1964. The streets in Sequoyah Woods often have Native American–style names.

Fleetwood Hills, with its main entrance along Chamblee Tucker Road, was developed in four phases from 1955 to 1957. This neighborhood was developed by James Embry with Poe & King Engineers handling the layout of the roads and lots. Fleetwood Hills is the only neighborhood in the district other than Northwoods that has welcome signs identifying the name of the community.

== Current character ==
The district remains as one of the more affordable communities in Northern DeKalb County, and it is now home to a diverse mix of cultures, including Hispanics, Koreans, Vietnamese, Chinese and many others. Buford Highway, which borders the northwestern side of the district, reflects this diversity in that it has become well known in Atlanta for its wide variety of authentic ethnic cuisines. The district was recognized by the website Curbed Atlanta in an article titled "Doraville’s Northwoods remains a midcentury modern treasure trove."
