= Chelsea Heights =

Chelsea Heights may mean:

== Australia ==
- Chelsea Heights, Victoria, Australia, a suburb of Melbourne

== United States ==
- Chelsea Heights (Druid Hills) near Atlanta, Georgia
- Chelsea Heights & Westchester Hills (Decatur) near Atlanta, Georgia
- Chelsea Heights, Atlantic City which is a neighborhood in Atlantic City
