= Winnona Park Historic District =

Historic district in Georgia, United States

- U.S. National Register of Historic Places
- U.S. Historic district
- Location within Metro Atlanta Location within Georgia Location within the United States
- Location: Bounded by College (N), Columbia (E), Mimosa/City Limits (S), Candler (W); Decatur, Georgia
- Coordinates: 33.766626°N 84.28786°W
- Built: 1923
- Architect: Leila Ross Wilburn
- Architectural style: Late 19th and 20th Century Revivals, Late 19th and Early 20th Century American Movements
- NRHP reference No.: 02000565
- Added to NRHP: May 30, 2002

Winnona Park is a historic area in the southeast corner of the Atlanta, Georgia suburb of Decatur. It is listed as a historic district on the National Register of Historic Places, but it is not one of the City of Decatur's locally designated historic districts.

Winnona Park is located south of downtown Decatur; west of the Village of Avondale Estates, Georgia and the Forest Hills subdivision; and east of Decatur's Oakhurst community. It primarily consists of residences, but is also known as the home of Columbia Theological Seminary. Its rough boundaries are Mimosa Drive and the Decatur city limits on the south; East College Avenue and the railroad tracks on the north; South Candler Street on the west; and South Columbia Avenue on the east. In addition, the commercial buildings on the east side of South Columbia Ave. at East College Ave. have historically been part of this community. This commercial cluster historically housed the neighborhood pharmacy, gas station and barbershop.

The early families of Winnona Park also have historic links to Agnes Scott College, which adjoins Winnona Park on the northeast. However, the South Candler Street—Agnes Scott College Historic District is listed separately on the National Register of Historic Places. The City of Decatur has also designated South Candler Street - Agnes Scott College as a local historic district. Bounded by East College Ave., South McDonough St, South Candler St., East Hill St. and East Davis St., it is no longer considered part of Winnona Park.

In addition, the Forrest Hills community east of South Columbia Avenue is located in unincorporated DeKalb County, and is not considered part of Winnona Park. However, the City of Decatur announced in 2008 that they were considering the annexation of Forrest Hills.

== History ==
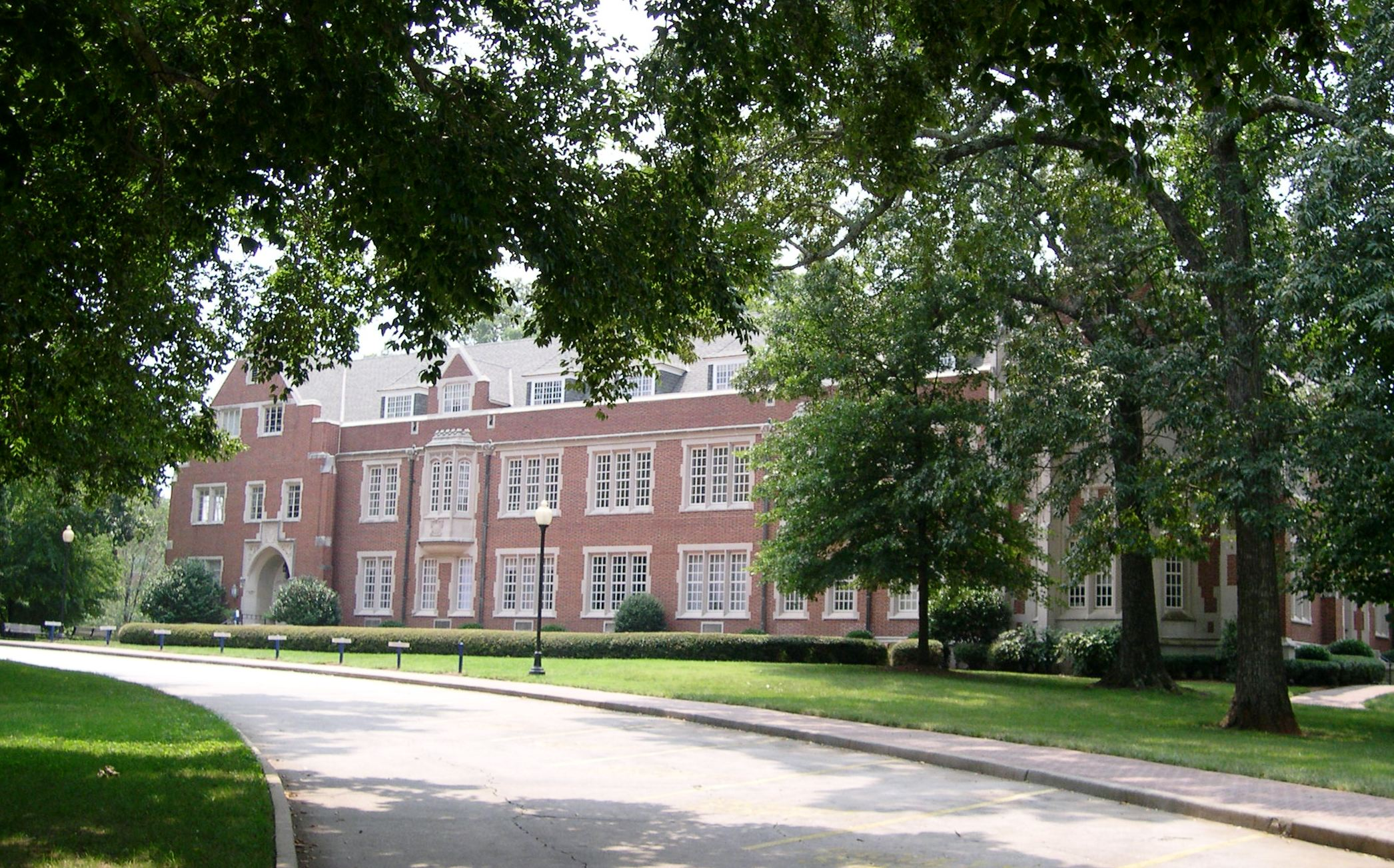
Main entrance to Columbia Theological Seminary, Winnona Park neighborhood, Decatur, GA

Winnona Park contained farms and estates in the 19th century. "Winnona" is named for the Winn family, who came to DeKalb County, Georgia in the first half of the 19th Century. James J. Winn was a clergyman and a surgeon in the C.S.A. His son-in-law, George Bucher Scott, began the development of Winnona Park. The 1868 farmhouse of another early settler, James C. Avary, still remains on South Columbia Drive. The "Avary-Fulton House", named after the Avary and Fulton families (that constructed and later purchased the home, respectively), was part of a farm that listed 19 slaves in the 1860 census.

During the U.S. Civil War, Union troops first occupied Decatur in July 1864. An 1864 map of Decatur shows Union trenches along East College Avenue, from South Columbia to Adams Street, just south of the railroad tracks. This gave the Union troops strategic control of the rail line. The Union troops, under General Schofield, were driven north through Decatur to the cemetery by Confederate troops under General Wheeler. However, the city fell to the Union again shortly before the Battle of Atlanta.

The North Georgia Conference of the Methodist Episcopal Church, South, purchased a small farm on the east side of South Columbia Drive in 1873 and relocated from Norcross, Georgia. By the start of the 20th century, 125 boys and girls lived at the "Decatur Orphans' Home" (as it was then known). The campus is presently known as the "United Methodist Children's Home".

The development of Winnona Park as a residential area began in the early 20th century. George B. Scott, a member of the Scott family that founded Agnes Scott College and Scottdale Mills, purchased the property from Dr. James Avary and began developing it.

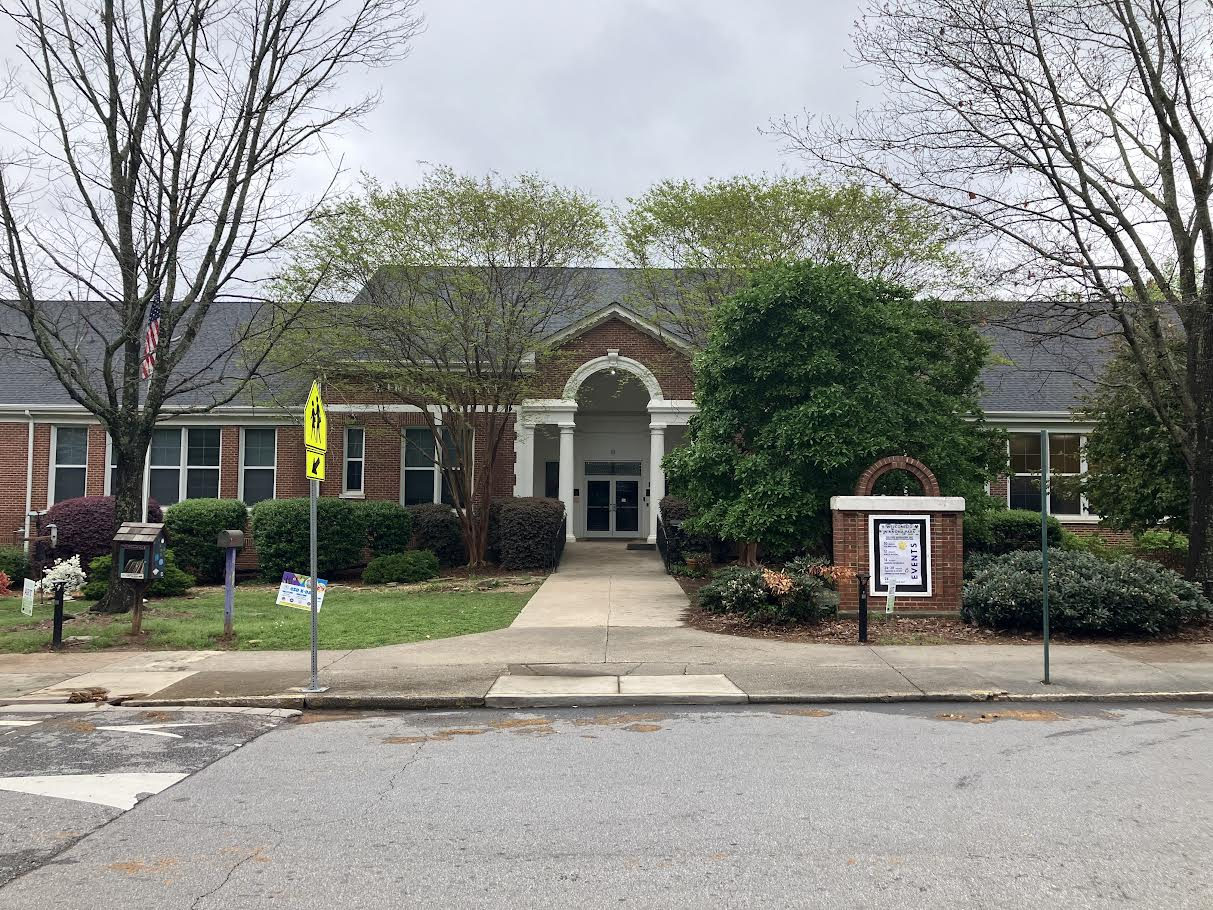
Winnona Park Elementary (April 2025)

The earliest business district began at East College and South Candler.", In 1913, Joseph Hughey operated a drug store, which was across the railroad tracks from Decatur's train depot. (This location now houses Farmstead 303.) In 1923, the Winnona Park Elementary School was constructed; the original school building is still used by the City of Decatur Schools and is the centerpiece of the community.

== Architecture ==
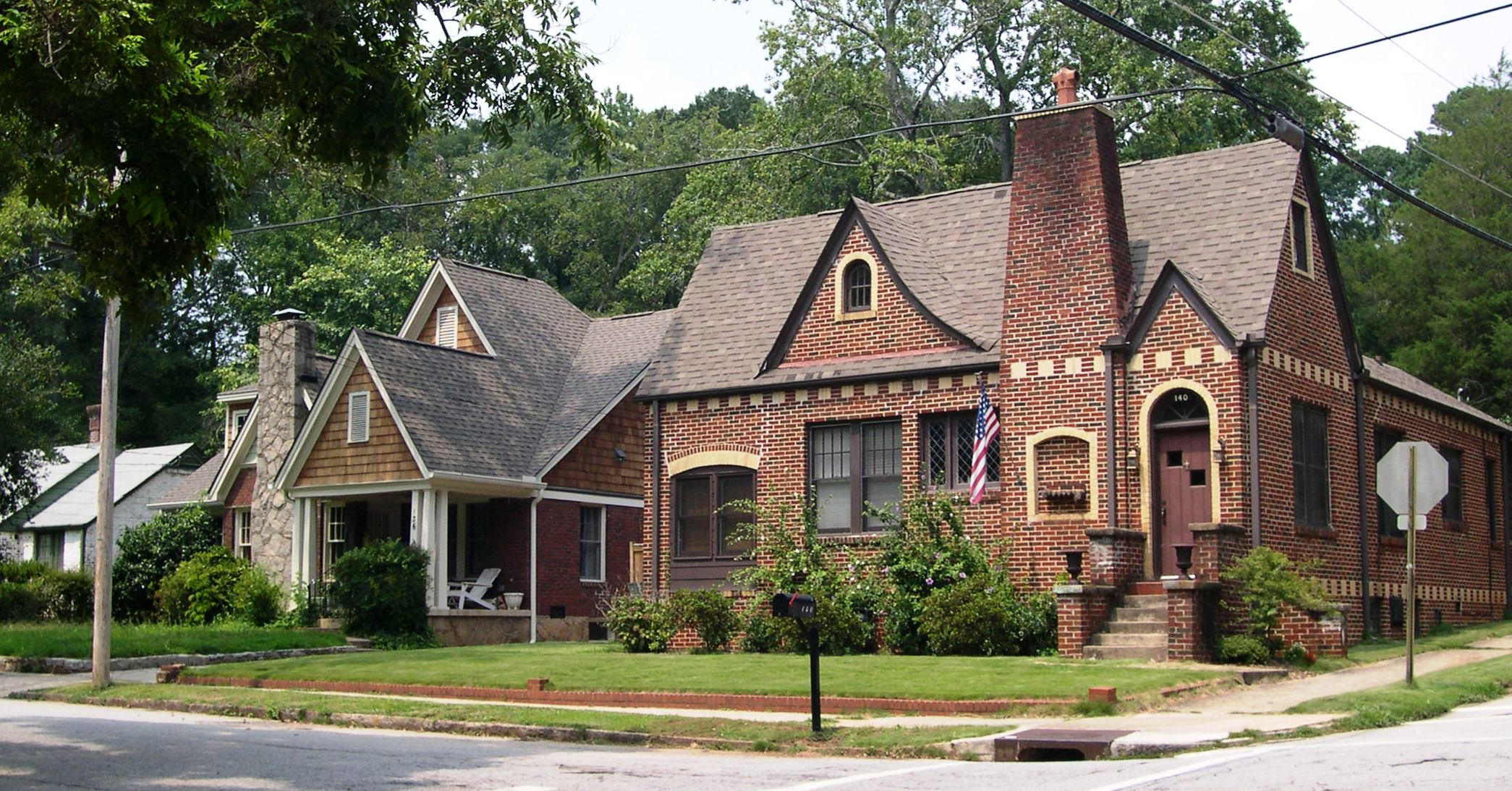
Winnona Park streetscape, Decatur, GA

Winnona Park is listed on the National Register of Historic Places for its late 19th- and early 20th-century American Movement buildings. It contains numerous architectural styles, including craftsman bungalows, Georgian Revival and English Country. Prominent architect Leila Ross Wilburn designed homes on Avery Street. Notable residences include:

- Agnes Lee Chapter House, United Daughters of the Confederacy, 120 Avery St. Built as a residence by Wilson Gosnell in the Colonial Revival style, this house is on the National Register of Historic Places.
- Avary-Fulton House, South Columbia Drive. Constructed in 1868, this is reportedly the oldest house in Decatur, Georgia.

== Churches ==
Winnona Park religious congregations include:

- All Souls Fellowship, 647 East College Ave. PCA-affiliated church located in East Decatur Station.
- Columbia Presbyterian Church, 711 South Columbia Dr. PCUSA-affiliated church located on the campus of Columbia Theological Seminary; membership is open to the public.
- Julie Thompson Smith Chapel, Agnes Scott College. This chapel conducts on-campus services for students, faculty and campus visitors of Agnes Scott College.

== Parks ==
- Dearborn Park, 1302 Deerwood Drive. The 7-acre (28,000 m^{2}) DeKalb County park has a basketball court, multi-use court, playground, picnic area and trail. It is located partially within the city of Decatur.
- Winnona Park Elementary School playground, 510 Avery St., includes a creekside playground and green space. However, this is school property and not a municipal park.

== Transportation ==
Winnona Park is near major transportation arteries, but has a limited number of roads connecting it to downtown Decatur due to the east–west rail line.

- DeKalb Avenue/East College Avenue, is the northern boundary of Winnona Park. East College Avenue serves at a primary entry point to the neighborhood from Avondale Estates and Interstate 285. East College is the highest point in the neighborhood and is located on the Eastern Continental Divide.
- Avondale MARTA rail station, is located northeast of Winnona Park at Sam's Crossing and East College Avenue.
- Memorial Drive, is located south of Winnona Park.
