= Sycamore Street (Decatur) =

Atlanta, Georgia

Coordinates: 33°46′28.5″N 84°17′27″W

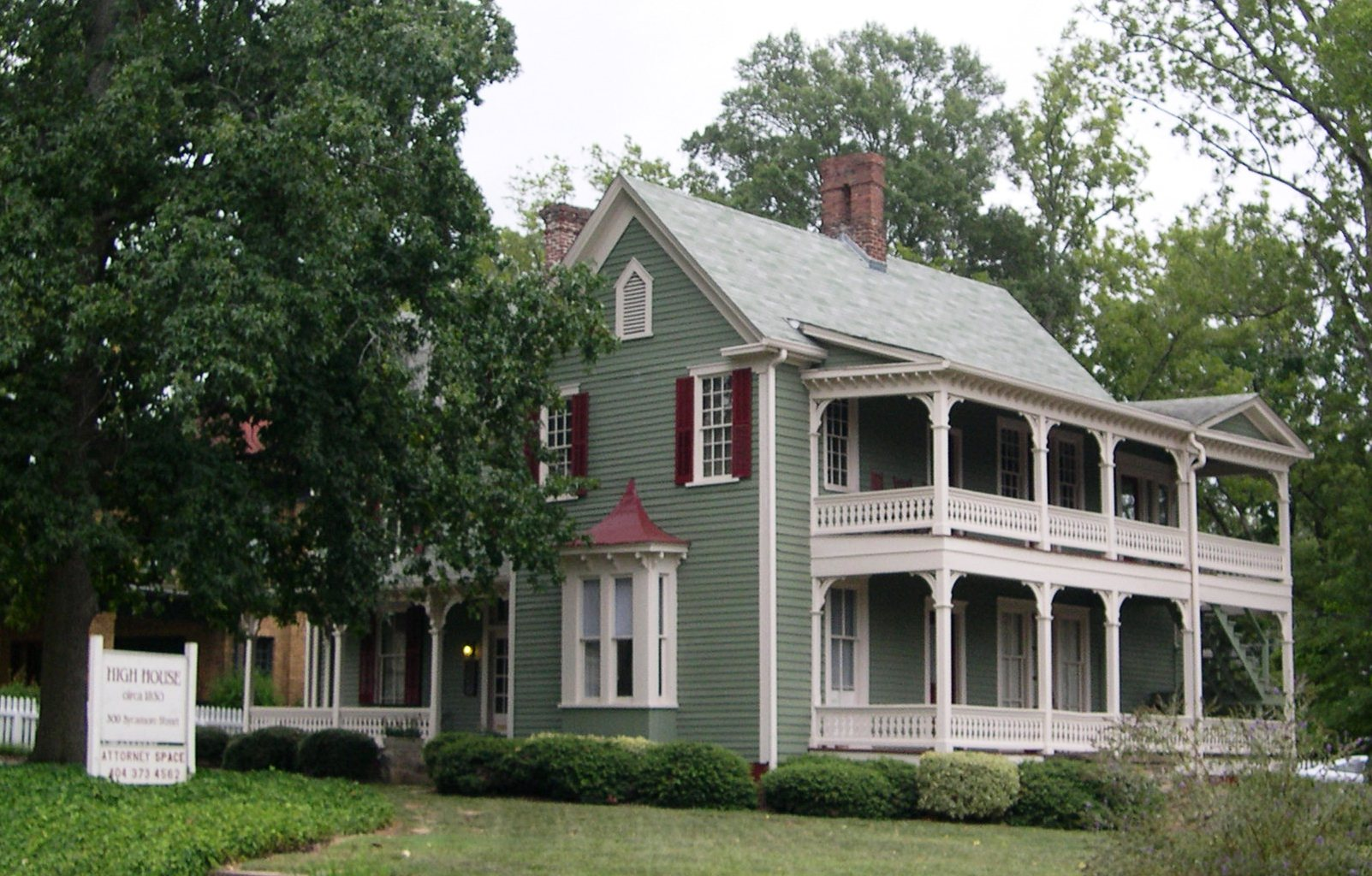
High House, built ca. 1830, Sycamore St., Decatur, Georgia

Sycamore Street is both a street and a historic neighborhood located in the Atlanta, Georgia suburb of Decatur. The street is known for its homes, which are some of the largest historic homes in Decatur. It is also "book-ended” by MARTA stations, and the MARTA track runs underneath the western end of Sycamore Street. The neighborhood includes historic homes, historic churches, townhouses and adaptive reuse condominiums.

Sycamore Street is accessed from Church St. to the west and East Ponce De Leon Ave. to the northeast. The street previously continued further west past Church St. However, this segment of the street became part of Decatur Square and is no longer accessible for vehicular traffic.

The Sycamore Street neighborhood is bounded by East Ponce de Leon Ave. to the north; the railroad tracks to the south; the Avondale MARTA station to the east; and downtown Decatur to the west. Other roads in the community include Glenn St., a segment of Mountainview St., Hillyer Pl., Sycamore Pl., Sycamore Square, Pate St., and a segment of East Howard Ave. Village Walk Dr and Village Ct. fall with the overall boundaries of the community, but are not part of historic Sycamore Street. In addition, Sycamore Street becomes Sycamore Dr. north of Ponce de Leon Ave., but this segment is considered part of the Decatur Heights community.

== History ==
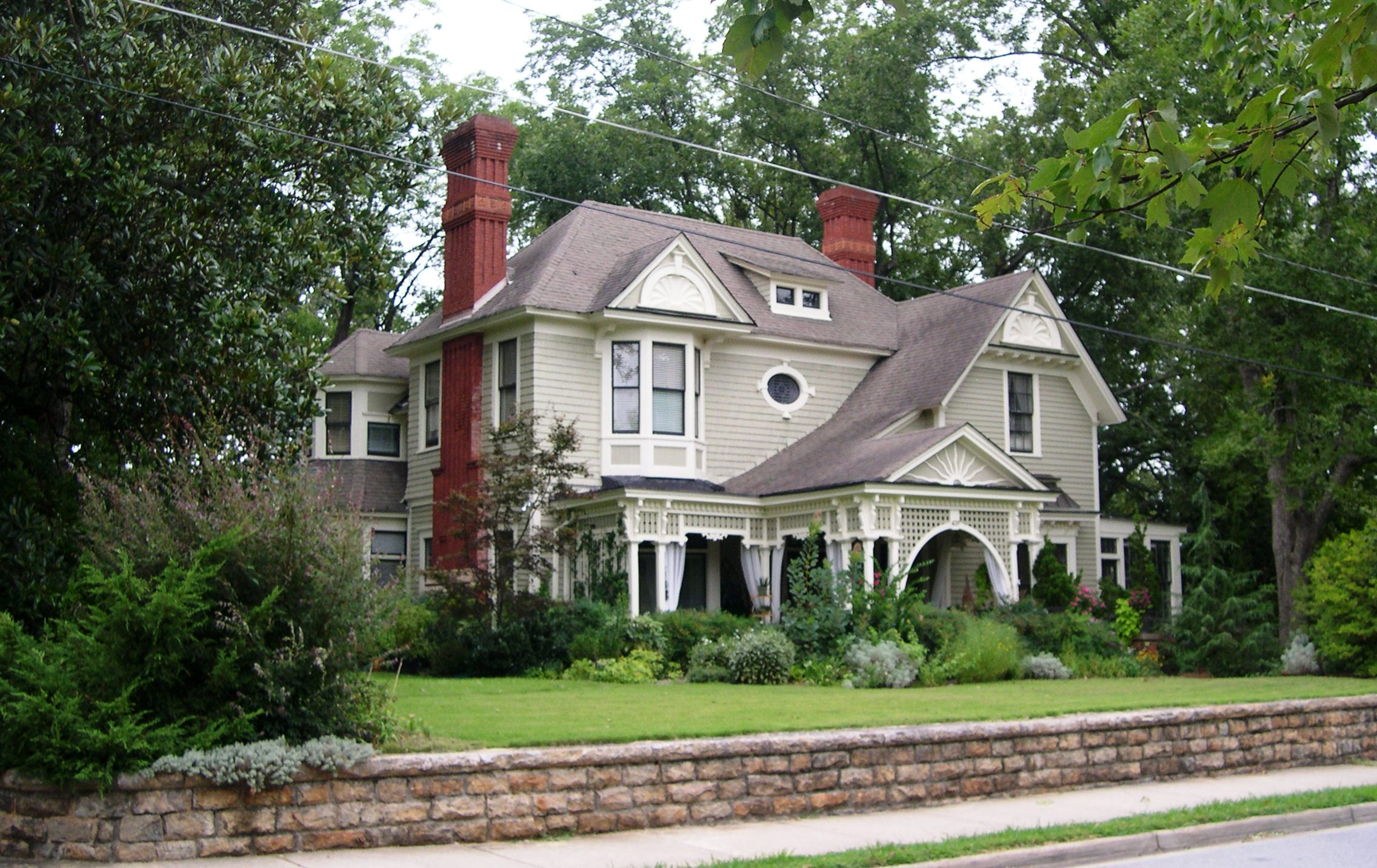
Historic home, Sycamore St., Decatur, Georgia

Sycamore Street was originally called Covington Road. It was a stagecoach route to Augusta through Covington, Madison and Eatonton.

It contains some of the largest homes in Decatur, including the historic High House – the first two-story house built in the city. The Death House (named for a family of that name) was moved from 719 to 813 Sycamore Street for the construction of MARTA; it is west of Sycamore Park (where the Death House once stood). The Sycamore Street neighborhood is also home to three historic churches, which include Decatur Presbyterian Church, the first church founded in the city; the historic granite chapel of First Methodist Church; and Holy Trinity Episcopal Church.

On the south end of the neighborhood is Decatur's former ice house, as well as several restaurants. It sits near the intersection of Commerce Drive and Sycamore Place, the latter of which is connected to Sycamore Street. An adaptive reuse of this 1926 commercial structure has resulted in a condominium development called the "Ice House Lofts" that overlooks the historic railroad tracks.

== Churches ==
- Decatur Presbyterian Church, 205 Sycamore St.
- First United Methodist Church Chapel, 312 Sycamore St.
- Holy Trinity Parish, 515 East Ponce de Leon Avenue (at Sycamore Place)

== Parks ==
- Scott Park, 213 Sycamore St. This 4-acre (1.6 ha) park is located behind the Decatur Recreation Center and adjacent to the Decatur Library. It includes tennis courts and is surrounded by gardens.
- Sycamore Park, Sycamore St. This large open greenspace is located between Sycamore St. and the MARTA railroad tracks, across from the historic homes.

== Transportation ==
- Avondale MARTA rail station, is located east of the neighborhood.
- Church Street, is located west of the neighborhood, and is the new western boundary.
- Decatur MARTA rail station, is located west of the neighborhood.
- Ponce de Leon Avenue, is located north of the neighborhood, and is the primary entry point from Atlanta.
