= Clairemont – Great Lakes (Decatur) =

Historic neighborhood in the Atlanta, Georgia, US, suburb of Decatur

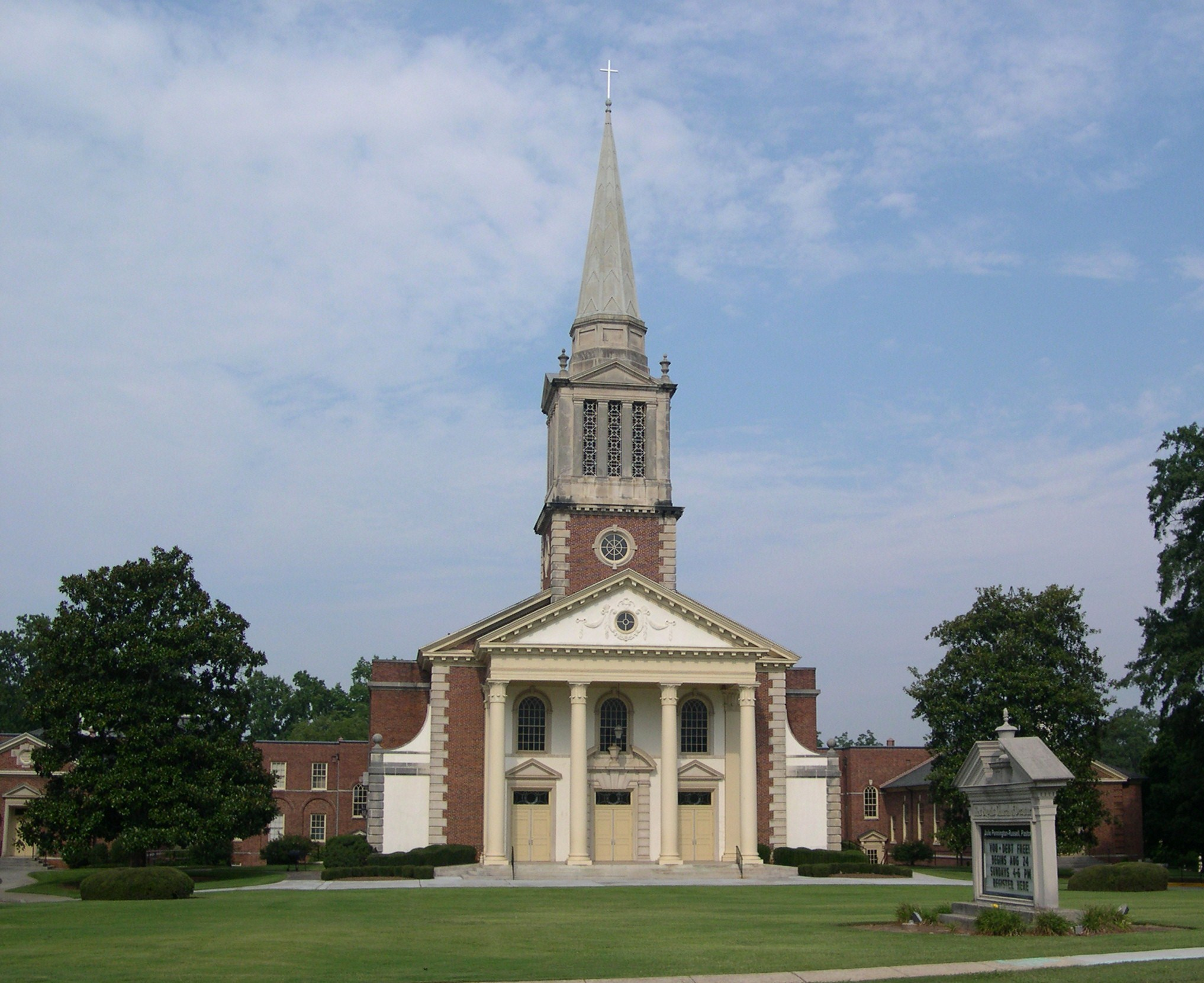
First Baptist Church, Clairemont Avenue, Decatur, GA

Clairemont - Great Lakes is a historic neighborhood in the north central section of the Atlanta, Georgia, suburb of Decatur. It primarily consists of residences and churches. However, there are businesses on West Ponce de Leon Avenue, in the southernmost section of the neighborhood. Its rough boundaries are Coventry Road, Ponce de Leon Avenue and Commerce Drive on the south; Church Street on the east; Scott Boulevard on the north; and Willow on the northeast. The section of Superior Avenue north of Scott Boulevard is also considered part of this neighborhood. Ridgeland Park, located northeast of the Clairemont - Great Lakes neighborhood, is not presently considered part of the neighborhood. It was developed later (1946–1950), in unincorporated DeKalb County. However, in 2008 the city of Decatur began evaluating annexation of this neighborhood, which is contiguous to the rest of the development.

The Clairemont Historic District primarily falls within the Clairemont - Great Lakes neighborhood. Enacted in 2001, the local historic district runs the length of Clairemont Avenue from Maediris Drive in the north to Commerce Drive in the south. The small portion from Scott Blvd. to Maediris lies in Decatur's Clairemont - Gateway neighborhood association, and not the Clairemont - Great Lakes neighborhood.

== History ==
Clairement Avenue originally followed part of a Native American trail leading to a shallow crossing at the Chattahoochee. It was previously known as Shallowford Trail and Webster Street. However, the Clairemont - Great Lakes neighborhood was not laid out until the early 20th Century. Beginning in 1913 and continuing through to the 1930s, it was developed in sections. As can be perceived from the name, the Clairemont - Great Lakes neighborhood actually consists of four smaller neighborhoods. These include the Great Lakes neighborhood, which has streets named after famous lakes; Clairemont Avenue, which bisects the center of the neighborhood in a north–south direction; Clairemont Estates; Emory Acres; and Ponce de Leon Terrace. Robert H. Paris developed Superior St., Michigan St., Seneca St., Huron St., Champlain St., Erie Ave., Geneva St., Lucerne St. and Parkside Circle from 1913 through the 1920s.

== Architecture ==
Clairemont - Great Lakes contains numerous architectural styles. The most common are Craftsman Bungalows, English Vernacular Revival and Georgia Vernacular Bungalows. Other styles include American Foursquare, Dutch Colonial and Moderne. There are also late 20th century townhomes and 21st century Brownstone townhomes on Scott Blvd.

== Churches ==
Churches within the neighborhood include:

- First Baptist Church, Decatur, 308 Clairemont Avenue.
- First Church of Christ, Scientist, Decatur, 446 Clairemont Avenue.
- Lutheran Church of the Messiah, 465 Clairemont Avenue.

== Parks ==
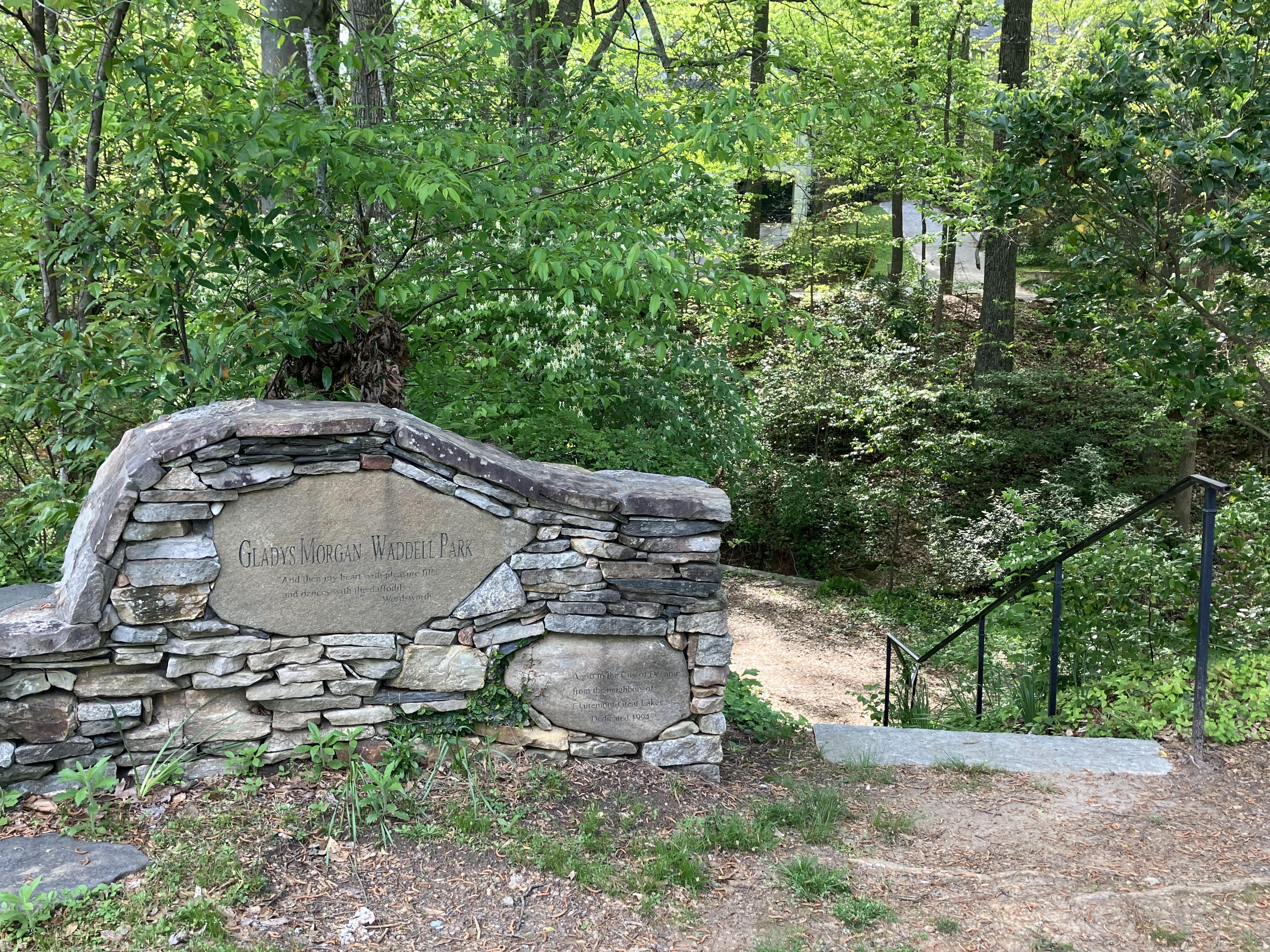
- Gladys Morgan Waddell Park Entrance (April 2025)
  (Gladys) Waddell Park, Huron St. & Champlain Rd. Originally called "Closeburn Park", this neighborhood park features a nature trail. It was donated to the city of Decatur by the neighborhood in 1994, and renamed after a benefactor.
- Peavine Creek Watershed, Wilton Drive. Although not a park, Wilton Drive lies in a unique ecological area that drains into Peavine Creek. It is monitored by the Peavine Watershed Alliance, and is on the City of Decatur's Walking Tour #4.
- Woodlands, 930 Scott Blvd. A 7.1-acre (29,000 m^{2}) nature sanctuary was donated to the Decatur Preservation Alliance (DPA) in 2002 by the Morse family.

== Transportation ==
- Clairemont Avenue, bisects the neighborhood and is the primary entry point to the neighborhood from Interstate 85. This is known as "Clairmont Road" north of the city limits.
- Decatur MARTA rail station, is located south of the Clairemont - Great Lakes neighborhood at Decatur Square.
- Ponce de Leon Avenue, is located south of the neighborhood, and is the primary entry point from Atlanta.
- Scott Boulevard, is located north of the neighborhood, and is the primary entry point from Interstate 285.
