= Chelsea Heights & Westchester Hills (Decatur) =

Neighborhoods in Georgia, United States

Coordinates: 33°46′53.1″N 84°18′38.8″W

Chelsea Heights and Westchester Hills are adjacent neighborhoods, separated by a municipal park, in the northwest corner of the Atlanta, Georgia suburb of Decatur. Chelsea Heights straddles the east and west sides of the CSX railroad tracks, falling within the City of Decatur and the unincorporated DeKalb County, respectively. The latter part, though located east of what historically was Druid Hills, is part of the Druid Hills CDP and participates in the Druid Hills Civic Association: see Chelsea Heights (Druid Hills).

Westchester Hills is fully within the city limits of Decatur, and is the more northerly of the two neighborhoods.

Chelsea Heights is the older and more historic of the two neighborhoods. It primarily contains single-family homes, but also contains a modest, low-rise condominium complex called Emory Chase, and duplex homes on North Parkwood Rd. Westchester Hills consists of single-family homes, the Decatur YMCA and a nursing home.

Both neighborhoods are north of Scott Blvd.; east of the heart of Druid Hills; and south of North Decatur. Although the neighborhoods front on Scott Blvd. and Clairemont Ave., there are no significant commercial structures other than the Decatur YMCA and the Venetian Pools Community Association, a private pool. Peavine Creek, part of the South Fork Peachtree Creek watershed, passes through these neighborhoods.

== History ==
The Chelsea Land Company began platting Chelsea Heights as early as 1912, but the area west of the railroad tracks (in unincorporated DeKalb County) was not platted until 1914. Construction of the first streets began in the 1920s, but most of the residences were constructed in the 1940s and 1950s – after the Great Depression. The variety of residential architectural styles in Chelsea Heights are partially due to the pre/post World War II construction periods. The oldest house in the neighborhood is a much-renovated American Small house that was built in 1935 and is located at 259 Chelsea Drive. The neighborhood has retained its historic character. Only five houses were constructed in the neighborhood between the 1960s and the present, and most of the renovations to historic houses have been compatible with the predominant historic styles of the neighborhood. Westchester Hills, on the other hand, primarily consists of single-family homes primarily built in the first half of the 1950s. Both neighborhoods have seen "tear downs" in the last 10–15 years, with the modest homes being replaced by upscale homes.

== Architecture ==
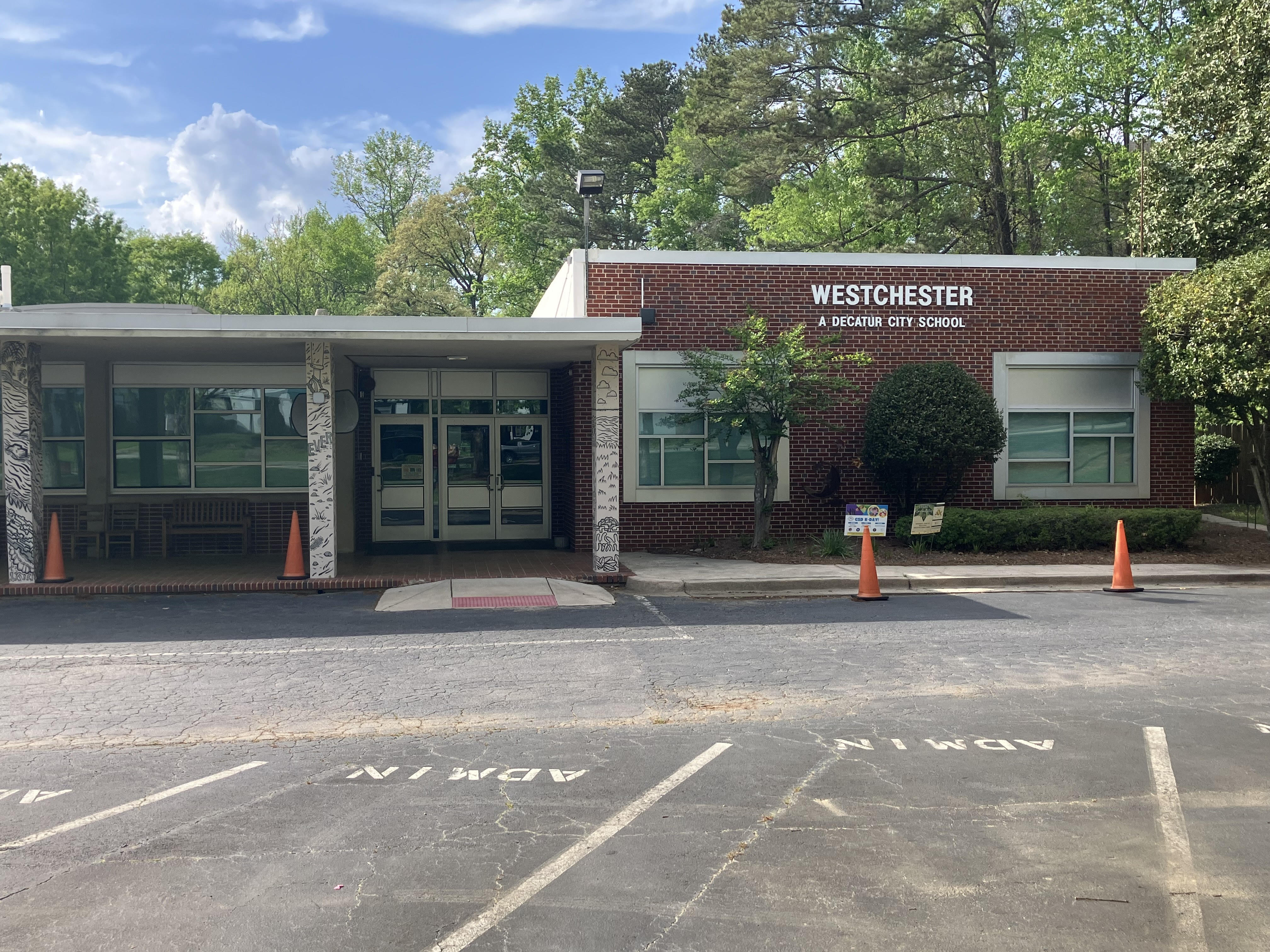
Westchester Elementary (April 2025)

The name "Chelsea Heights" is derived from the name of the development company, Chelsea Land Company, and the hilly terrain of west Decatur. Despite the construction of some homes in the 1920s, the majority of Chelsea Heights homes were constructed in the post-war era. The two primary architectural styles found in the community were Minimal Traditional and Ranch style homes, but Bungalow, Cape Cod and Contemporary homes are also present in the neighborhood. Most residences have a horizontal appearance to them, and are modest in comparison to the mansions located in the heart of Druid Hills to the west. For this reason, Chelsea Heights has more in common architecturally with Decatur than with Druid Hills. The neighborhood is also notable for its curvilinear, steep roads, and for homes that sit 1-2 stories above those roads.

City of Decatur streets in the Chelsea Heights neighborhood include Chelsea Dr., Pope Cir., Mockingbird Ln., Ridley Cir., Kathryn Ave., Merrill Ave. and North Parkwood Rd. North Parkwood backs up to the CSX railroad tracks. Coventry Road is the main road that bisects the neighborhood. The middle segment of Coventry Rd. is located within Chelsea Heights' City of Decatur section; the west leg is in Druid Hills; and the east leg is in Ponce De Leon Heights. Additional streets are located in the western section of Chelsea Heights.

"Westchester Hills" derives its name from Westchester Dr., the primary east–west street in the neighborhood, and its location in the hilly terrain of west Decatur. Other streets in Westchester Hills include Maediris Way, Dogwood Way and Harold Byrd Way. The west end of Westchester Dr. backs up to the CSX railroad tracks.

== Parks and recreation ==
- Fernbank School Park, 157 Heaton Park Dr. This DeKalb County 12-acre (49,000 m^{2}) park is located west of the CSX railroad tracks. It includes a multi-use field and court, playground, picnic area and walking trails.
- Hidden Cove Park, 758 Scott Blvd. This City of Decatur park is east of the CSX railroad tracks, behind the former Westchester Elementary School. The park is located between Chelsea Heights and Westchester Hills. The City of Decatur also purchased a vacant parcel containing a stream and trail that adjoins this park, and falls between N. Parkwood Rd. & Westchester Hills Dr. in 2007. The "Wildcat Trail" runs through this park.
- Westchester Elementary School has a playground with playground equipment suitable for young children as well as a small, edible garden used by the school for teaching purposes. There is a large, open field, great for pickup soccer games. Additionally, there are picnic tables and a basketball court.
- Venetian Pool Community Association, 150 Scott Blvd. A private community association with a pool.
- YMCA - Decatur, Clairemont Ave. & Maediris Way.

== Transportation ==
- Clairemont Ave., is located east of Westchester Hills, and serves as a primary entry point from Interstate 85.
- Ponce de Leon Blvd., is located south of the unincorporated DeKalb County portion of Chelsea Heights, serves as a primary entry point from Atlanta.
- Scott Blvd., is located southeast of both neighborhoods, and serves as a primary entry point from Atlanta and Interstate 285.
