= South Decatur Trolley Trail =

Hiking and biking trail in Atlanta, Georgia

Coordinates: 33°45′15.1″N 84°20′4.1″W

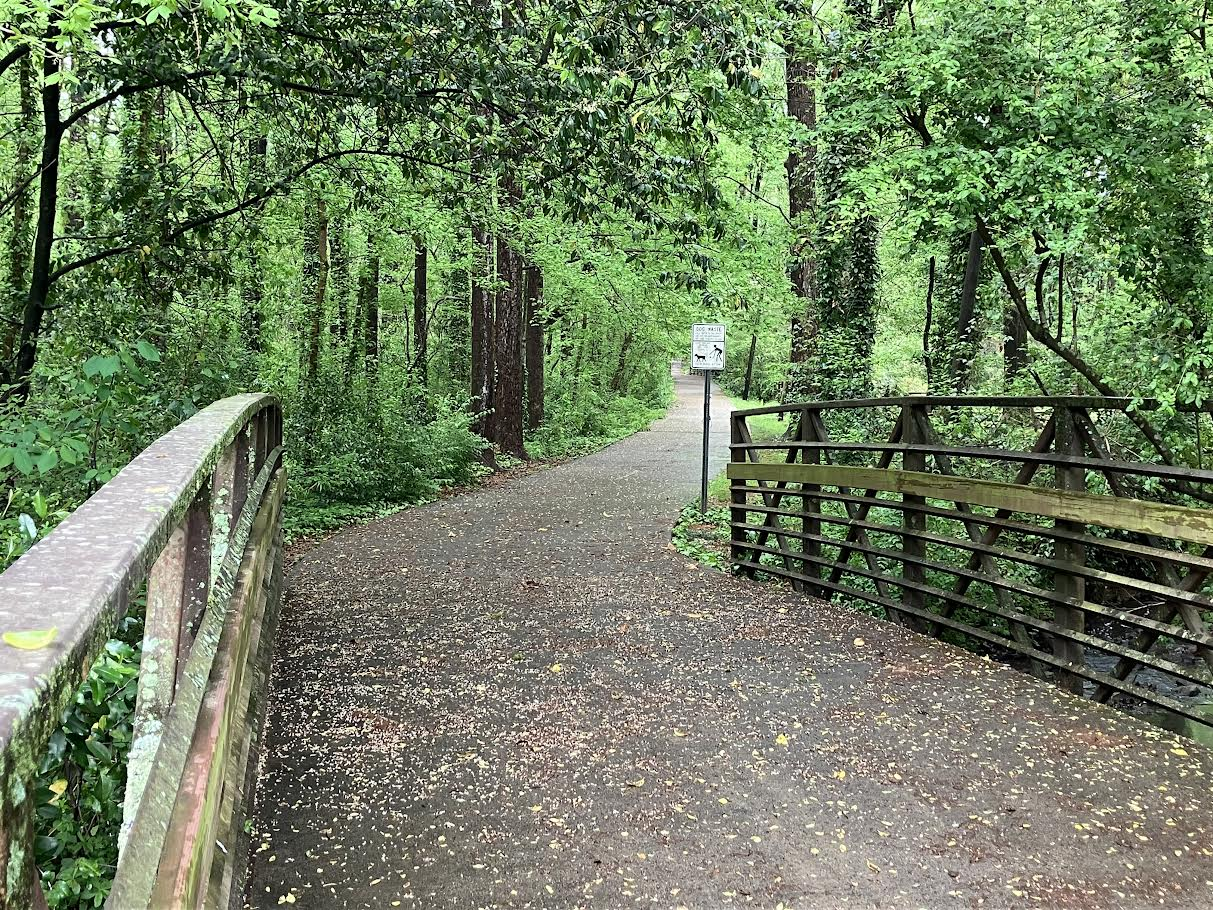
South Decatur Trolley Trail View from West Bridge. Decatur Georgia.

South Decatur Trolley Trail is a hiking and biking trail built by PATH in Atlanta, Georgia in the United States.

== History ==
The right-of-way was originally a part of the South Atlanta's Metropolitan Street Railroad Company and the section of the trail was separated from public roadways. The route which ran through Edgewood, Kirkwood and Oakhurst eventually became Route 18 of the Georgia Power Streetcar system but since it runs out-of-band is ideal for cyclists and runners today.

The trail opened on June 5, 1996.
