= MAK Historic District (Decatur) =

Coordinates: 33°45′55″N 84°17′53″W

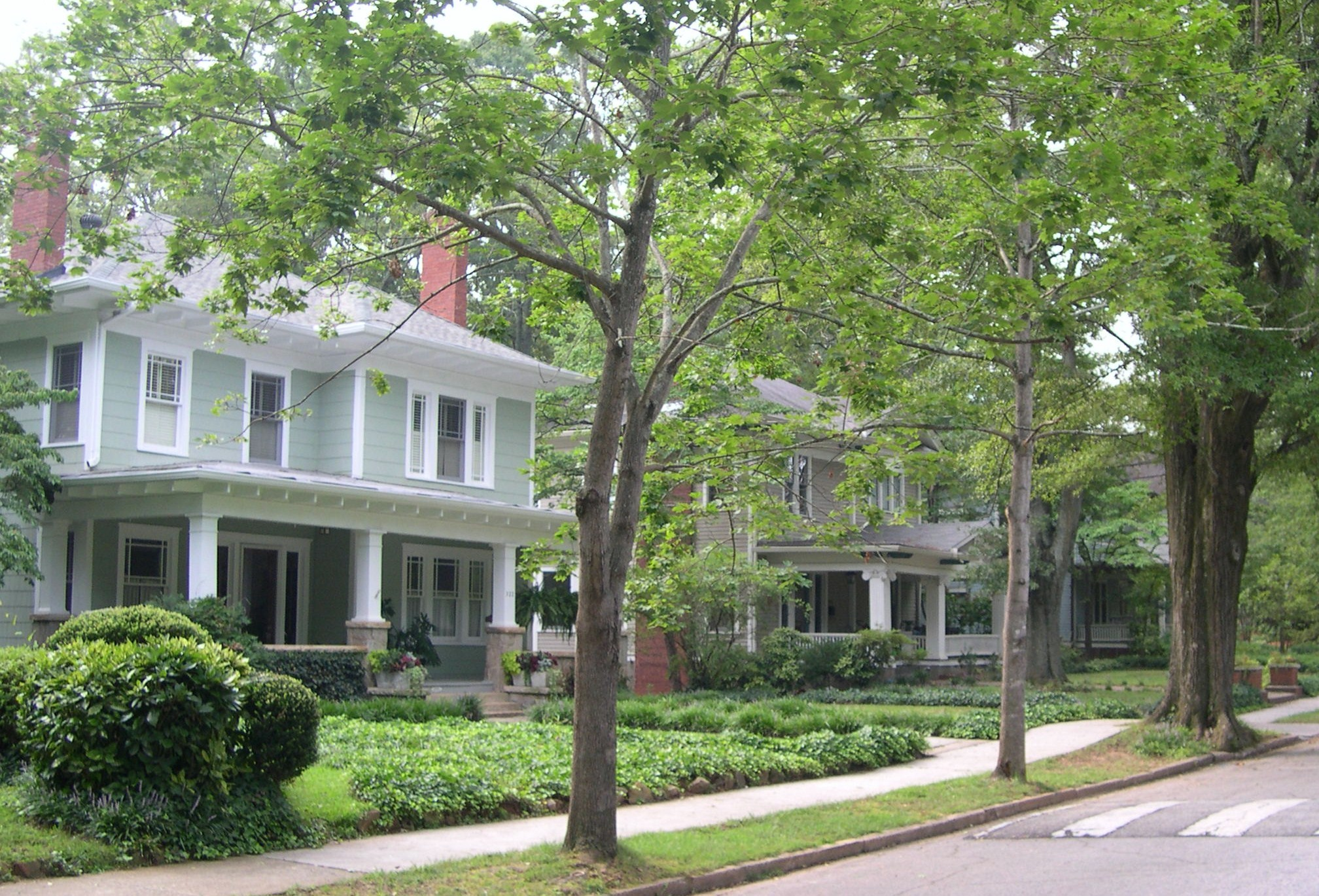
Historic Homes on Adams Street in Decatur, Georgia's MAK Historic District

The MAK Historic District is the first locally designated historic district in Decatur, Georgia. It is named for the three main streets it encompasses (McDonough, Adams and Kings Highway) and covers ten city blocks of varying sizes. The district is located immediately west of Agnes Scott College, and south of College Avenue. Decatur's historic Oakhurst neighborhood developed to the south and west of the MAK historic district, resulting in the district being surrounded by structures of a similar context.

== Overview ==
Decatur was founded in 1823, before neighboring Atlanta. The MAK neighborhood was Decatur's first residential subdivision, developed by John Mason and Poleman Weekes who purchased the property in 1907. Local architect Leila Ross Wilburn designed many of the homes for Mason and Weekes.

The MAK neighborhood offers examples of the American Craftsman style homes that were popular during the first three decades of the 20th century. The neighborhood sought listing as Decatur's first local historic district in order to establish design guidelines and a design review to protect its unique character.

It is the site of many movie and television filming locations, most recently the television series "October Road" starring Tom Beringer, Geoff Stults and Laura Prepon and the 2007 movie "Stomp the Yard" starring Columbus Short.
