= Woodlands Garden =

Public garden in Decatur, Georgia, USA

- Interactive map of Woodlands Garden
- Type: Public garden
- Location: Decatur, Georgia, United States
- Coordinates: 33.78594°N 84.30312°W
- Area: 7 acres (2.8 ha)
- Created: 2002
- Status: Open all year
- Website: WoodlandsGarden.org

Woodlands Garden is an eight acre mostly-wooded public garden located in Decatur, Georgia. The Garden's mission is to preserve a woodland garden as an urban sanctuary to educate and engage the community in the natural world. This public greenspace serves as a native plant habitat for the Georgia Piedmont region, with over 30 species of trees. Ferns, wildflowers, vines, and shrubs are common features of the diverse plant collection. The Garden became a protected greenspace in 2002, when it was donated by the Morse family to become publicly accessible. The property has been influenced by landscape architect Edward L. Daugherty, among others.

In 2015, Woodlands Garden completed a capital campaign to support an expansion to the Garden property and improvements to the current site as part of a master planning process. The multi-year project included

- updating visitor center
- improved parking and creation of safe school bus drop-off zone
- enhancements to the site of former Morse home, including ADA accessible paths

Woodlands Garden is open every day of the year from dawn to dusk for free. In addition to being a tranquil place for reflection, there are several workshops, events, and programs hosted on site. On Sundays, during warm weather months, local musicians perform during Music in the Garden sessions. Family-friendly annual programs such as Fairies in the Garden, Stories in the Woods, and Music, Art, & Youth showcase (M.A.Y. Fair) are organized to engage the community and bring together people of all ages.

The small staff maintains and runs the garden with the help of skilled volunteers and interns.
