= Chelsea Heights (Druid Hills) =

Neighborhood in Georgia, United States

Coordinates: 33°46′53.1″N 84°18′38.8″W

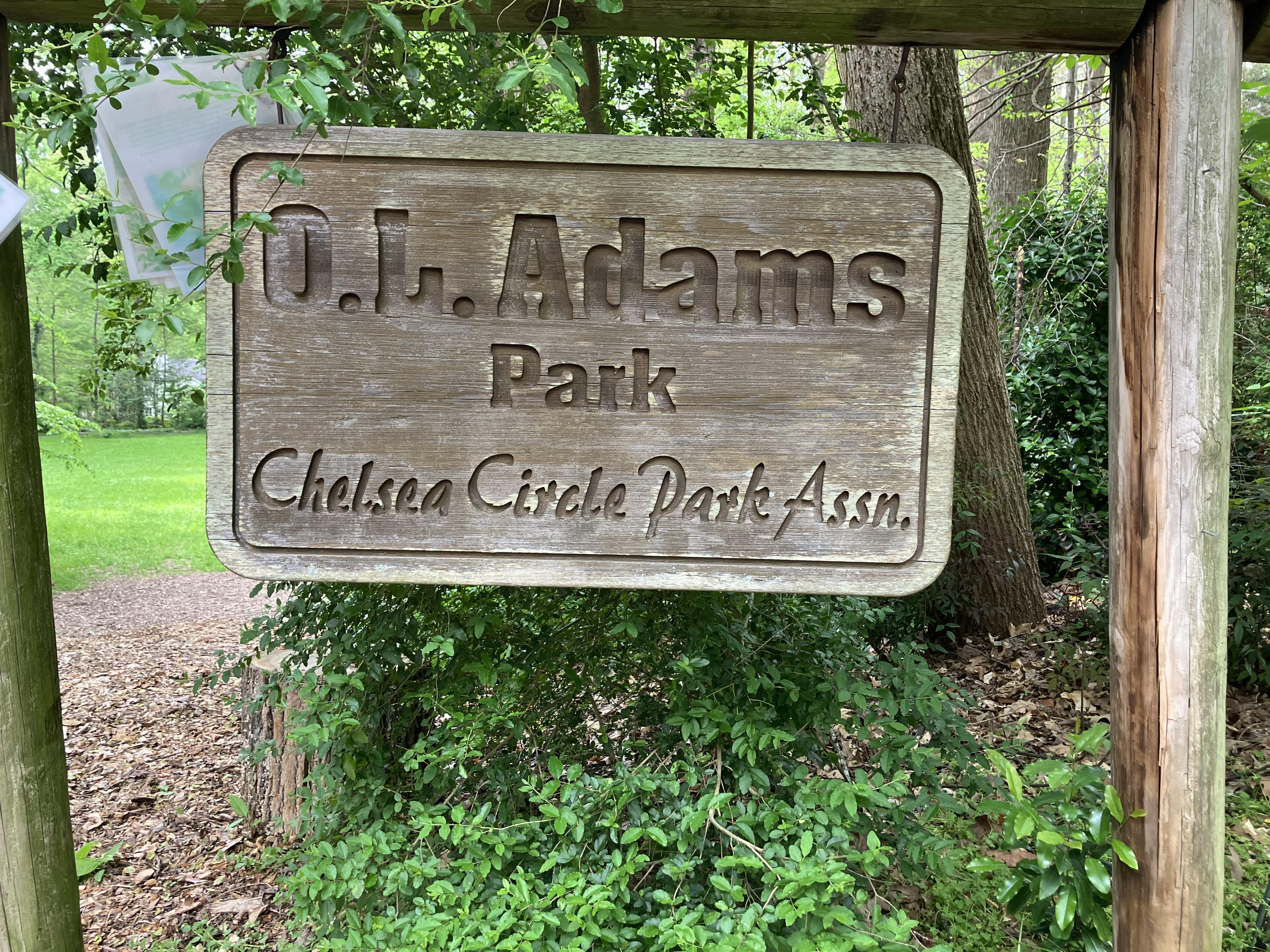
O.L. Adams Park Sign (April 2025)

Chelsea Heights is a neighborhood at the eastern end of the Druid Hills CDP in DeKalb County, Georgia. Although not part of the area historically considered Druid Hills, it participates in the Druid Hills Civic Association. It is a designated "character area" for which architectural guidelines and recommendations have been established.

Streets in the neighborhood are Chelsea Circle, Vickers Road and Circle, Coventry Road, Dyson Drive, Heaton Park Drive, Hummingbird Lane, and Woodview Drive.

An adjacent area east of the CSX railroad tracks in the city of Decatur is also called Chelsea Heights; see Chelsea Heights & Westchester Hills (Decatur).

== History ==
The Chelsea Land Company began platting property to the east of the Clifton Road area as early as 1912-1913. Chelsea Heights subdivision, located west of the railroad, was platted in 1914 by the Realty Engineering Company. Street and home construction did not commence until the mid-1920s and 1930s with the overwhelming majority of homes being constructed during the late 1940s through the mid-1950s.

== Architectural styles ==
Chelsea Heights consists mostly of older, modest historic Minimal Traditional houses, and later Ranch-style homes. The Ranch homes reflect the growing wealth of the 1950s and 1960s and the general fascination with the “West Coast” lifestyle, and for those homes, the original 50 foot lots were usually combined to form lots with widths at the street from 75 to 150 feet. The landscape design emphasized “outdoor living” with integrated terraces and patios. Other styles in Chelsea Heights include bungalows, Cape Cod and Contemporary.
