= Midway Woods (Decatur) =

Coordinates: 33°45′20″N 84°16′40″W

Midway Woods is a neighborhood adjacent to Decatur, Georgia. The neighborhood is comprised over 700 homes, the majority of which are located in the 30030 zip-code, but are not within the current borders of the City of Decatur.

== Location and composition ==
Midway Woods is located in unincorporated Dekalb County, residents enjoy the benefits of living beside the City of Decatur while paying lower taxes than City residents. Midway Woods is located between Memorial Drive, Columbia Drive, and Candler Road. Midway Road runs through the neighborhood.

Midway Woods is made up of mostly brick Cape Cod style homes built 1950–1953 on wide tree-lined streets. Many of these homes have experienced extensive renovation and expansion since their original construction. Newly constructed homes can be found dotting the neighborhood and in clusters on Midway Road, McEvoy Lane, Conway Road, and Oldfield Acres Way.

== Neighborhood association ==
Midway Woods has a strong neighborhood association www.MidwayWoodsNeighborhood.com, whose purpose is to keep neighbors connected, informed, and to generally improve the quality of the neighborhood for all residents. The neighborhood association is not a homeowners' association with covenants or dues but does operate under approved by-laws and annual election of officers. Meetings are generally held on the first Wednesday of the month.

== Schools and transportation ==
As a result of the Dekalb County School Superintendent's 2020 Master Plan, beginning June 2011 students residing in Midway Woods will attend Dekalb County's Avondale Elementary, Druid Hills Middle and Druid Hills High School. Residents of Midway Woods are in the top attendance zone for the highly regarded Museum School of Avondale Estates (http://www.themuseumschool.org), a Dekalb County charter elementary school. Agnes Scott College and Columbia Theological Seminary are close by as are several private schools including The Friends School of Atlanta and the Waldorf School of Atlanta.

Mass transit is easily accessed by way of bus stops throughout the neighborhood. MARTA buses take residents to nearby train stations including Decatur Station.

== Parks and amenities ==
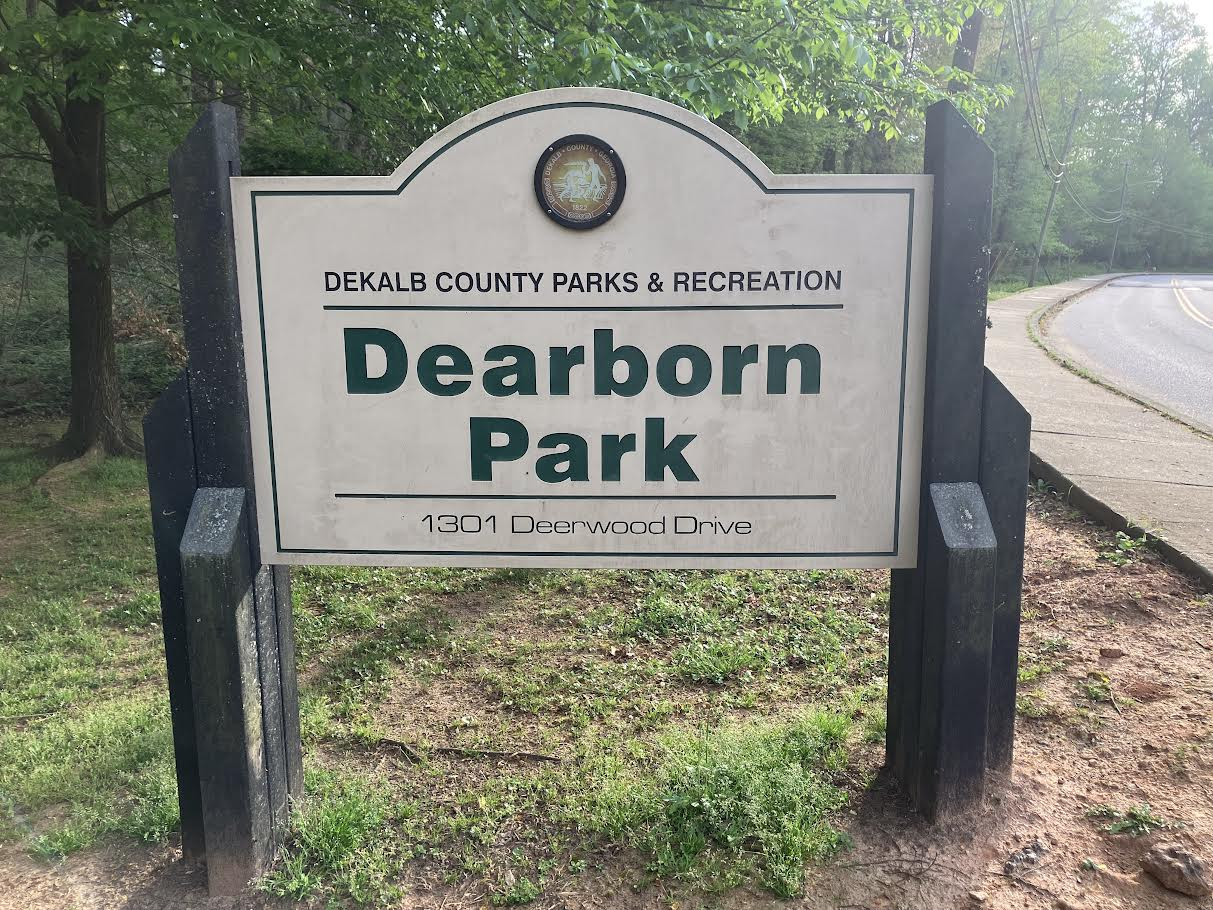
Dearborn Park North Entrance Sign

Dearborn Park, located on the western side of Midway Woods, has 7 acres of green-space with a new boardwalk and gravel trail, basketball court, picnic pavilions, running streams, and a newly installed playground. Dearborn Park is undergoing a dramatic revitalization with the help of www.FriendsofDearbornPark.org

Midway Woods benefits from its proximity to several grocery stores including Publix, Kroger, and Walmart. Residents enjoy the vibrant nightlife offered by the City of Decatur and have the pleasure of dining in several of Atlanta's top restaurants located within walking distance.
