= Ponce de Leon Heights (Decatur) =

Historic neighborhood in Atlanta, Georgia, USA

Coordinates: 33°46′30″N 84°18′30″W

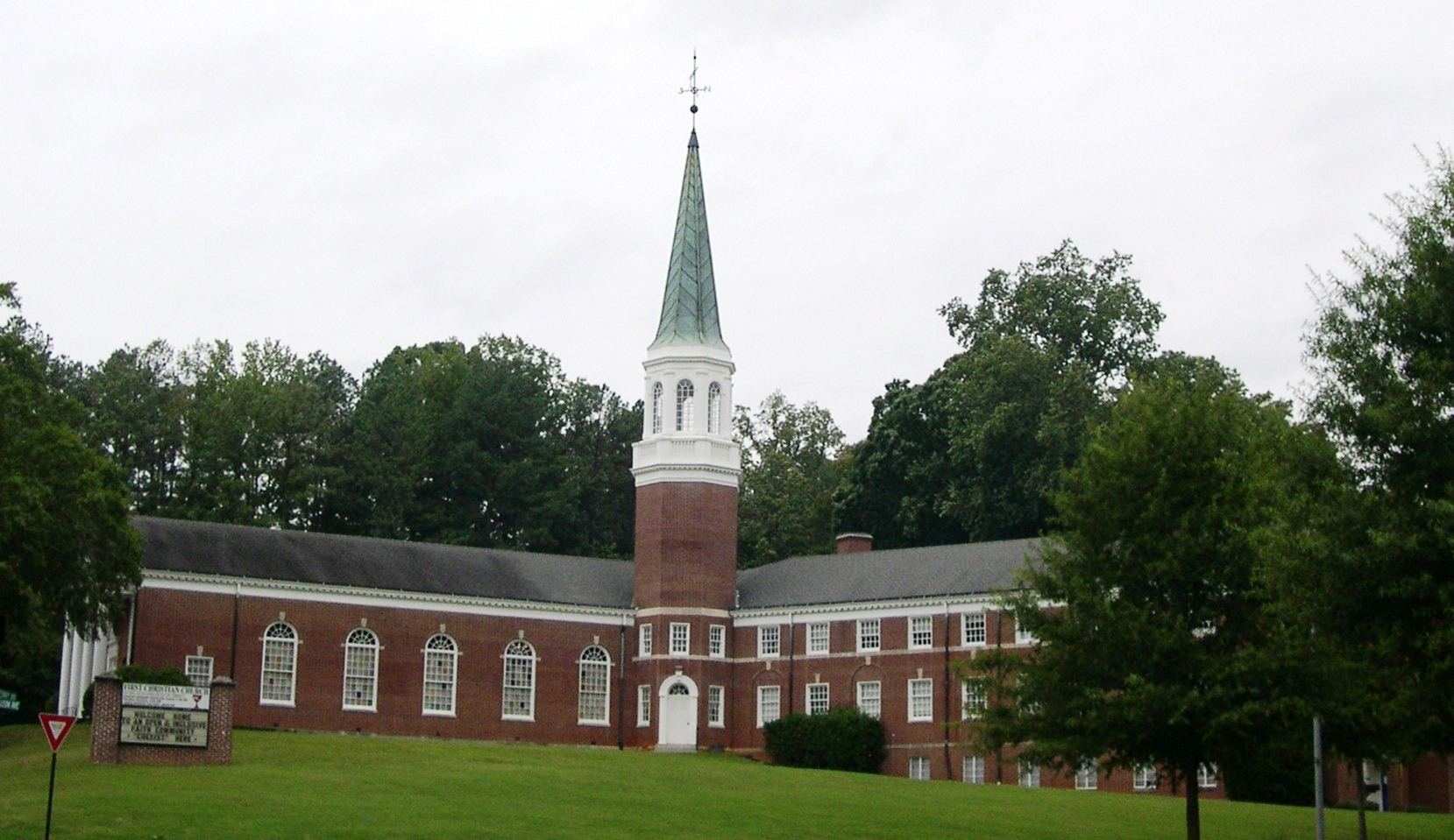
First Christian Church, SE corner of Ponce de Leon Heights

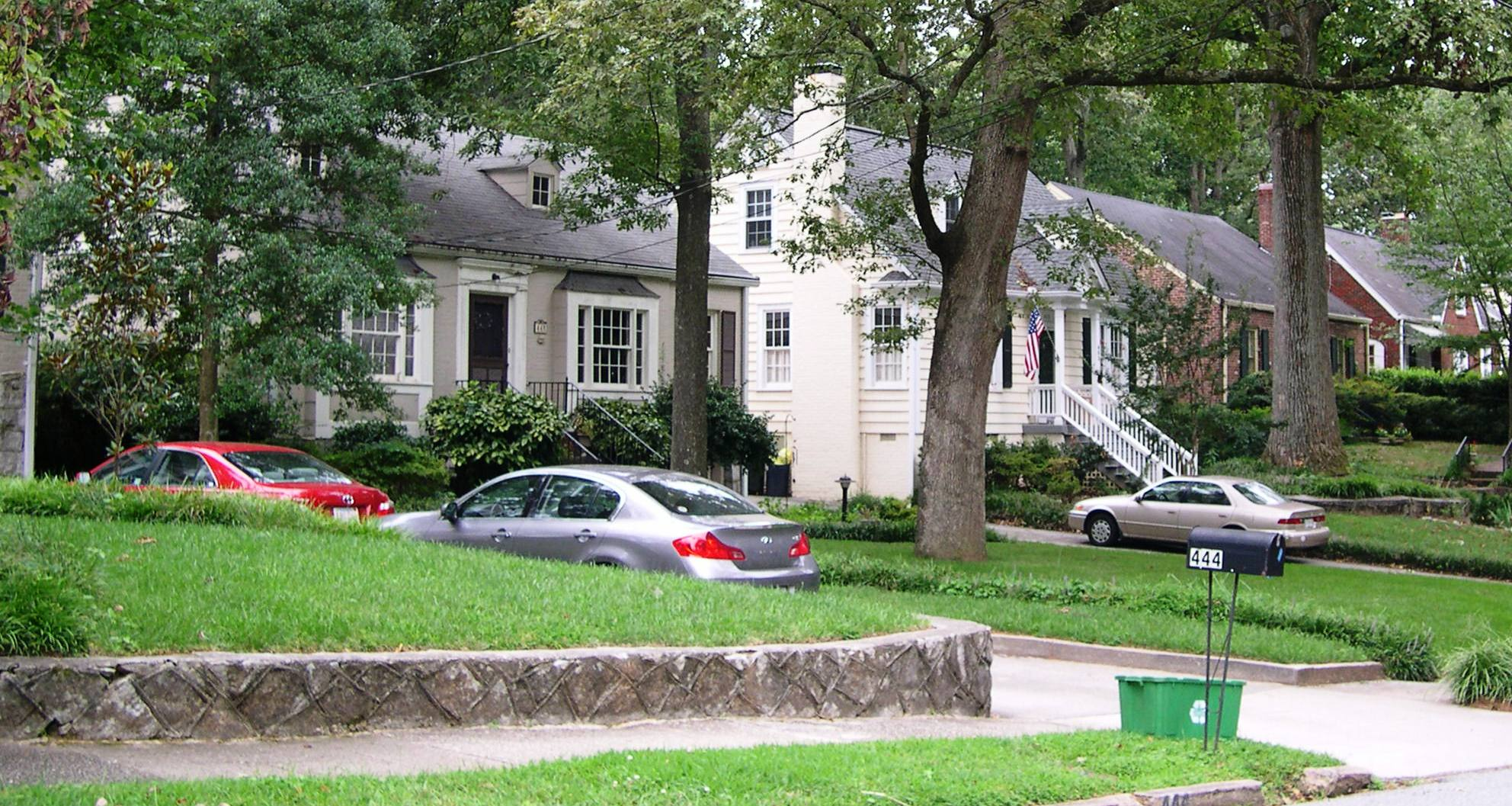
Streetscape in Ponce de Leon Heights

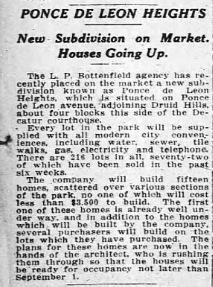
1914 article announcing groundbreaking

Ponce de Leon Heights is a historic neighborhood in the west section Decatur, a suburb of the Atlanta, Georgia, USA. It includes single family residences and a church, primarily built in the early 1900s. The neighborhood is located between Scott Blvd. to the northwest, Ponce de Leon Avenue to the south and Coventry Road to the east. Although the neighborhood partially fronts on Ponce de Leon Avenue, there are no commercial businesses.

== Architecture ==
The name of the community is apparently derived from fronting on the north side of Ponce de Leon Avenue, and from the hilly terrain of west Decatur. Ponce de Leon Heights homes were primarily constructed starting in 1914, sit on small lots and include many examples of Craftsman bungalows architectural style. Streets in the community include Clarion Ave., Nelson Ferry Rd., Woodlawn Ave., Fairfield St. and the southeast leg of Coventry Rd.

Although not directly connected to the other neighborhood roads, Pinetree Dr. falls within the greater community boundaries. However, homes and lots on Pinetree Dr. are substantially larger than neighboring roads. This street is architecturally distinct from the other streets, and a parcel adjoining Ponce de Leon Ave. was developed as cluster housing.

== Churches ==
- First Christian Church (Disciples), 601 W. Ponce de Leon Ave.

== Transportation ==
- Scott Blvd. is located north of the neighborhood, and is the primary entry point from Interstate 285.
- Ponce de Leon Avenue is located south of the neighborhood, and is the primary entry point from Atlanta.

== Parks ==
Ponce de Leon Heights does not have a City of Decatur or DeKalb County park. However, the church playground at Nelson Ferry Rd. & Northern Ave. is open to residents.
