= South Candler Street–Agnes Scott College Historic District =

Historic district in Georgia, United States

- U.S. National Register of Historic Places
- U.S. Historic district
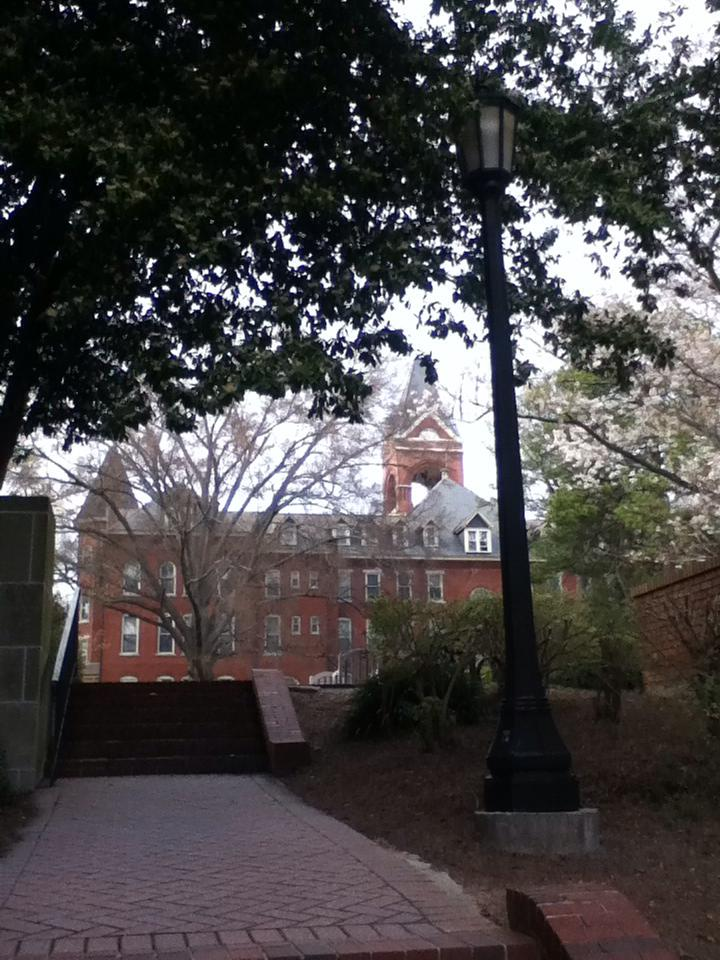
- Agnes Scott College campus

- Location within Atlanta Location within Georgia Location within the United States
- Location: Roughly bounded by E. College, S. McDonough, S. Candler, E. Hill and E. Davis Sts., Decatur, Georgia
- Coordinates: 33°45′54″N 84°17′37″W
- Area: 95 acres (38 ha)
- Architect: William Ansley
- Architectural style: Late Victorian, Late 19th And 20th Century Revivals, Late 19th And Early 20th Century American Movements
- NRHP reference No.: 94000787
- Added to NRHP: July 29, 1994

South Candler Street–Agnes Scott College Historic District is a historic district in Decatur, Georgia that was listed on the National Register of Historic Places in 1994.

== District scope ==
It includes Agnes Scott College, also known as Decatur Female Seminary (1889) and as Agnes Scott Institute (1890-1906), and Little Decatur.

In 1994 it included 88 contributing buildings, two contributing structures, and a contributing object, as well as 19 non-contributing buildings and two non-contributing structures.

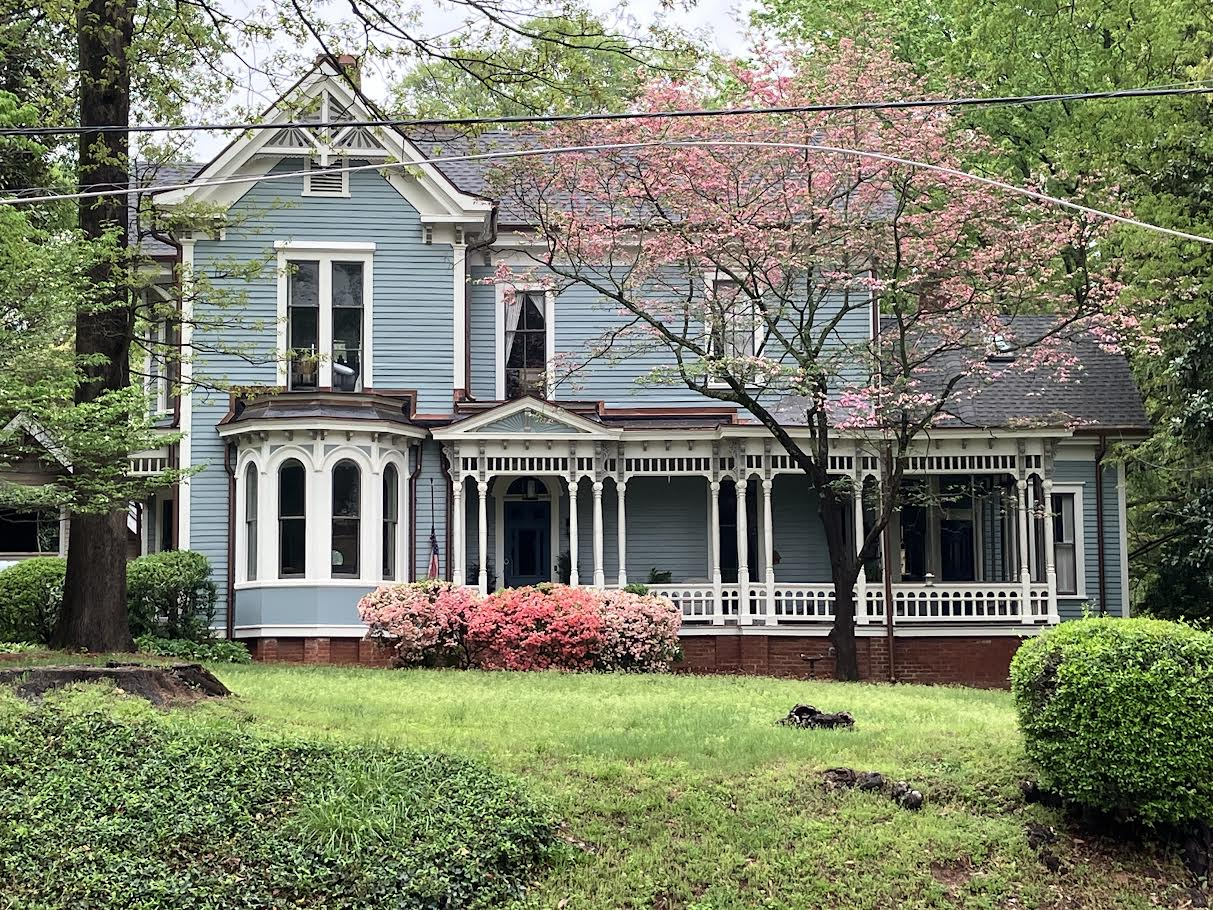
C.M. Candler House at 158 South Candler, Decatur, Georgia

== Notable buildings ==
The oldest house in the district is the Italianate C. M. Candler House (1870s) at 158 South Candler. Another old one is the George Washington Scott House (1883) at 312 South Candler Street which has a double gambrel roof and Queen Anne detailing.

The oldest building on the campus is Agnes Scott Hall (1891), known also simply as "Main," a three-story, brick building designed by local architects Bruce and Morgan.
