= Oakhurst, Decatur, Georgia =

Neighborhood in Georgia, United States

Coordinates: 33°45′48″N 84°18′39″W

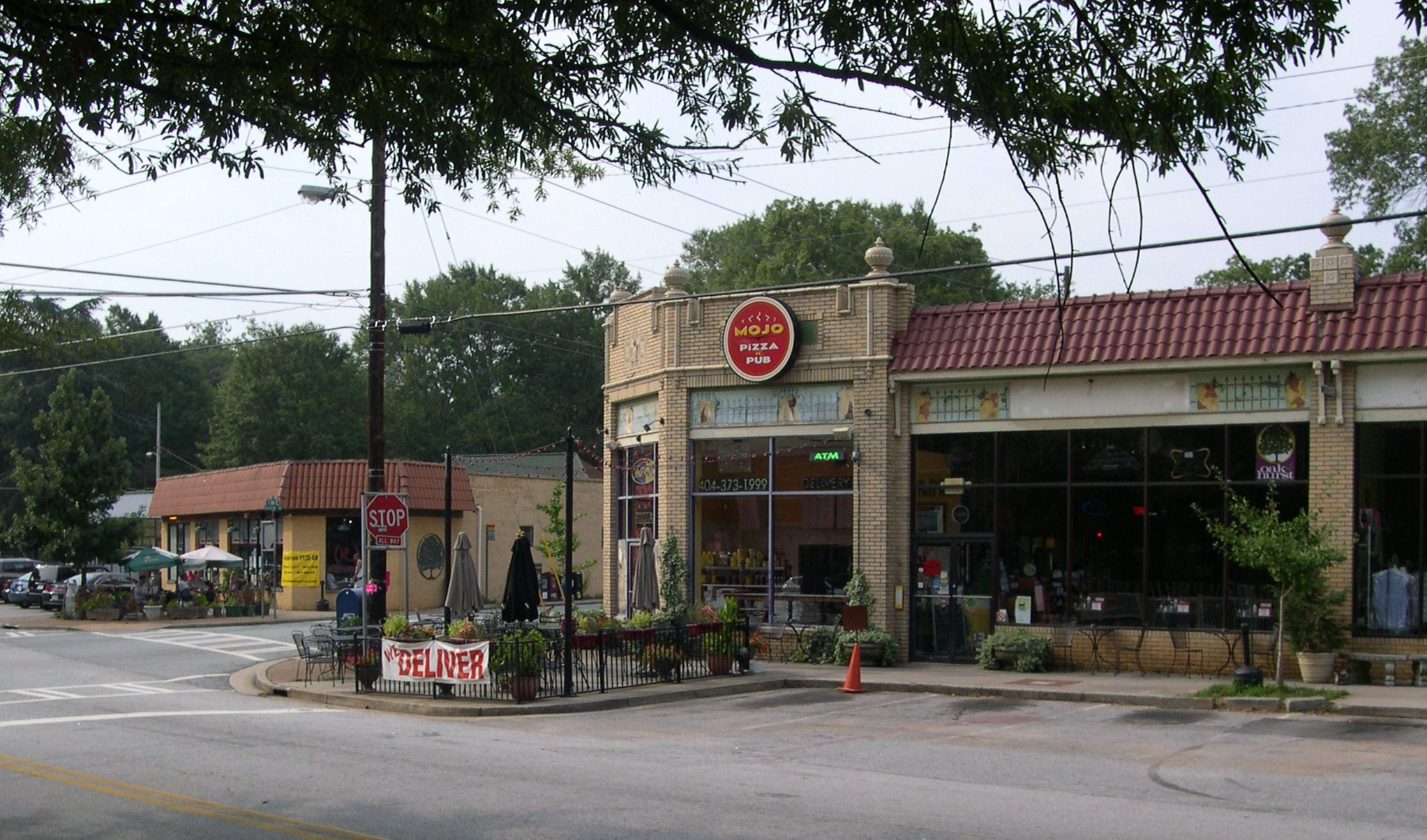
Restaurants in converted commercial buildings in the Oakhurst Business District, Decatur, GA

Oakhurst is a historic neighborhood in the southwest corner of Decatur, Georgia, adjacent to the eastern edge of Atlanta, Georgia. It is located south of downtown Decatur and approximately six miles east of downtown Atlanta.

== Description ==
Oakhurst primarily consists of residences built in the early 20th century and neighborhood businesses. It is roughly bounded by the City of Atlanta's Kirkwood neighborhood (west of Winter Ave.) on the west; the City of Atlanta's East Lake neighborhood (Northern St. & Pharr Rd.) on the south; Decatur's West College Ave. (and the railroad tracks paralleling West College Avenue) on the north; and Decatur's South McDonough St. on the east. There is also a neighborhood near the College Heights Early Learning Center (roughly centered on South McDonough St. & Lenore St.) referred to as "College Heights", but it is part of Historic Oakhurst.

At the center of the neighborhood is a business district popularly known as "Oakhurst Village" with several eateries, art galleries, and shops. Oakhurst Village is also home to the former Old Scottish Rite Hospital, designed by local architect Neel Reid in 1917. The hospital relocated to the Perimeter District of Atlanta in 1976, and the historic building currently houses an art gallery, a wine bar, and the Solarium, a community center and event facility, where local neighborhood groups meet. There are additional commercial properties and a MARTA rail station (East Lake station) at the northern boundary of Oakhurst, on West College Avenue. Decatur's only middle school, Beacon Hill Middle School (formerly Carl G. Renfroe Middle School) is located within the neighborhood. Beacon Hill is located on Kings Highway, near Ansley Street.

Oakhurst is an eclectic, liberal, typical of intown Atlanta. It has a diverse mix of African Americans, white residents, senior citizens, single people, young couples, young families, empty nesters, and a large gay community. According to the 2000 Census, slightly fewer than 5,000 people lived in Oakhurst.

== History ==
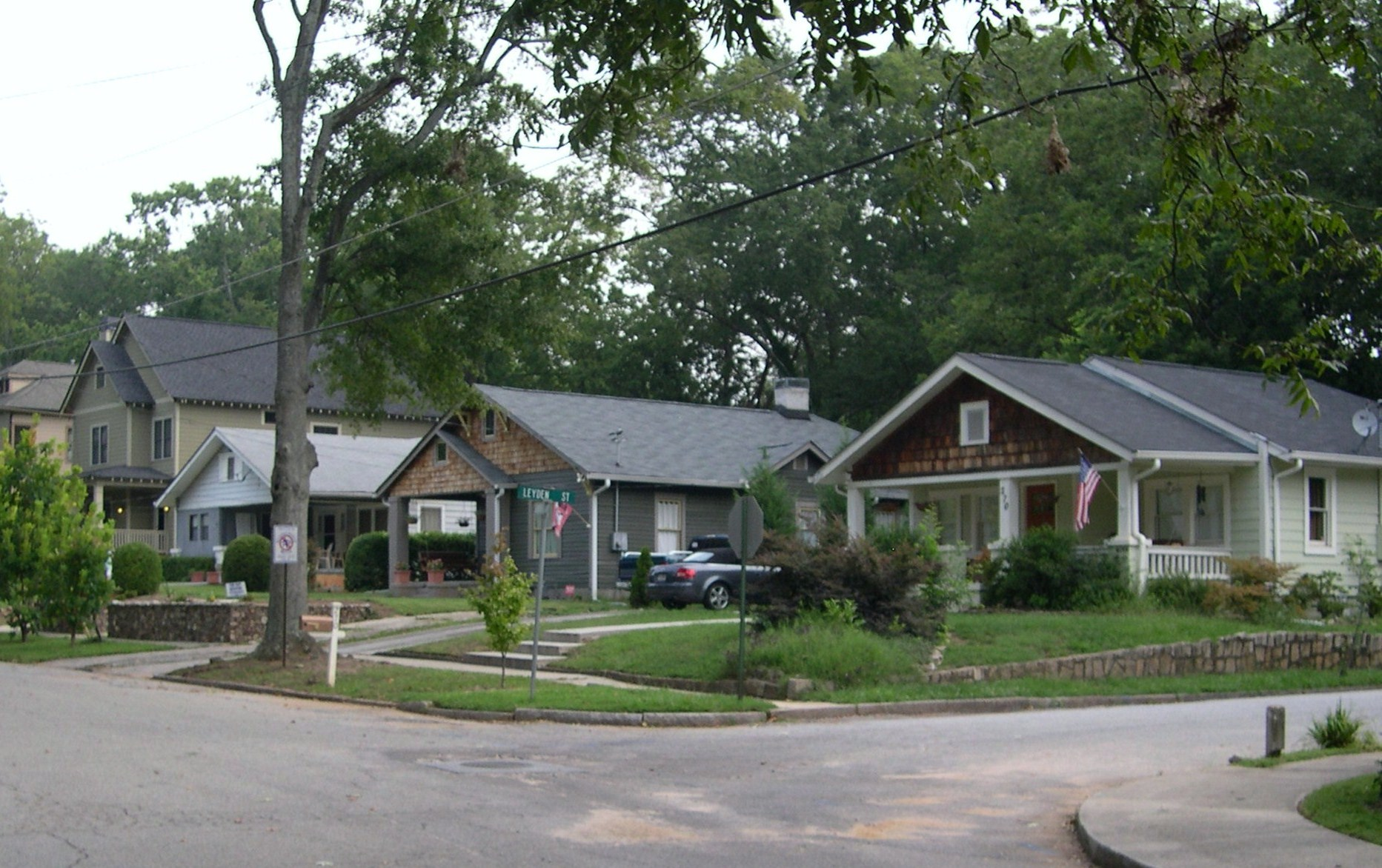
Bungalows in the Oakhurst community, Decatur, GA

Oakhurst originally developed as a streetcar suburb of Atlanta. The Atlanta Consolidated Street Railway built the North Decatur trolley line in 1892. This line crossed the South Decatur trolley line at the center of the Oakhurst business district - the intersection of East Lake Drive, Oakview Road and Mead Road. This portion of Oakhurst was owned by Eugenius N. Meade in the late 19th century. His land was purchased by John Ridley in 1907. Mr Ridley had a small farm at this location, but he made his money in the mercantile business and in real estate. He sold much of his land in 1910, and it became part of the newly incorporated Town of Oakhurst.

In 1910 the Georgia Legislature approved the incorporation of Oakhurst. Oakhurst's population was approximately 100 people at the time of incorporation, mostly located around the railroad tracks near College Avenue and the present MARTA station. The original residential directory gave addresses on Park Place, Madison (formerly Viola), College Avenue, Mead Road (formerly Meades Road), and Winter Avenue. Although residences had been constructed in the MAK Historic District as early as 1905–1907, Oakhurst primarily developed in the 1910s and 1920s. The development occurred in clusters. In addition to the 1910 John Ridley development, the Feld Realty development occurred in 1910, the East Lake Land Development Company constructed structures in 1910 and 1924, and the A.R. and L.M. Morris development occurred in 1915.

The northern section of Mead Road was annexed by the City of Decatur in 1907, but the Town of Oakhurst was not annexed into the City of Decatur until 1914–1916. Shortly after annexation, however, Oakhurst's City Hall/Schoolhouse burned and destroyed all of the town records, so little is known about the old Town of Oakhurst. Oakhurst remains a distinct community within the City of Decatur.

== Architecture ==
Oakhurst is predominantly a residential community. The primary architectural style of the period homes is that of craftsman bungalows although some homes were also built in the more modest post-war style of the 1940s. The structures are primarily down-scale, pre-World War II, brick homes with front porches. Recently, as property values have risen due to gentrification, newer homes have been built in varying styles.

Notable historic structures, other than churches, include:

- Old Scottish Rite Hospital, 321 W. Hill St. A National Historic Landmark designed by local architect Neel Reid in 1917.

== Churches ==
Oakhurst has several churches.

- Oakhurst Baptist Church is the oldest church building in Oakhurst, it began as a Sunday School in 1908 and was formally organized in 1913.
- Eastside United Methodist Church began holding public worship services in 2011.
- Oakhurst Presbyterian Church was founded in 1921.
- Thankful Baptist Church, Decatur's first African-American congregation, was founded in 1882. They purchased the imposing brick and stone building in 1970 from Patillo Memorial Methodist Church (formerly Oakhurst Methodist Church). Patillo began as a Sunday School in 1908 and was chartered in 1912.

== Schools ==
Oakhurst's public schools include

- Oakhurst Elementary, a lower elementary school, originally built in 1921. In 2020 it switched from serving grades Kindergarten-3 to serving grades Kindergarten-2.
- Fifth Avenue Upper Elementary School (FAVE), originally an elementary school, was vacant for many years after Decatur restructured its school system. It was demolished, and a new building on the site opened as Decatur's 4-5 Academy in Summer 2011. In 2020 it switched from serving 4-5th grade, to serving 3-5th grade.
- Beacon Hill Middle School (Formerly Carl G. Renfroe Middle School), serving grades 6–8, was built in 1972.

== Festivals ==
Oakhurst festivals include:

- BBQ, Blues & Bluegrass Festival, Harmony Park in Oakhurst. Live music and barbecue.
- Earth Day in Oakhurst, Harmony Park in Oakhurst.
- Jazz Nights at Scottish Rite', Old Scottish Rite Hospital. Free jazz concerts under the stars.
- Oakhurst Arts & Music Festival, Harmony Park in Oakhurst. Artists market.
- Oakhurst Porchfest, "a grassroots community music festival where front porches become stages" through the neighborhood.

== Parks ==
Oakhurst includes Decatur City Parks.

- Mead Road Park, 3/4 acre park located next to Oakhurst Elementary School
- McKoy Park/Pool, 9-acre (36,000 m^{2}) recreation park and pool
- Oakhurst Park, 8-acre (32,000 m^{2}) recreation park
- Harmony Park, a small neighborhood park in Oakhurst square

== Transportation ==
Oakhurst is near major transportation arteries but has a limited number of roads connecting it to downtown Decatur due to the east-west MARTA line.

- DeKalb Avenue/East College Avenue is the northern boundary of Oakhurst. East College Avenue serves as a primary entry point to the neighborhood from Avondale Estates and Interstate 285. DeKalb and East College lie on either side of the MARTA rail line, are the highest points in the neighborhood, and are located on the Eastern Continental Divide.
- East Lake MARTA rail station, is located at Dekalb Avenue and East Lake Avenue.
- Memorial Drive, is located south of Oakhurst.
- Ponce de Leon Avenue, is located north of Oakhurst, and serves as the major entry point to the neighborhood from Atlanta via East Lake Drive.
