= Decatur Heights =

Historic community in Atlanta, Georgia, USA

Coordinates: 33°47′8.5″N 84°16′54.6″W

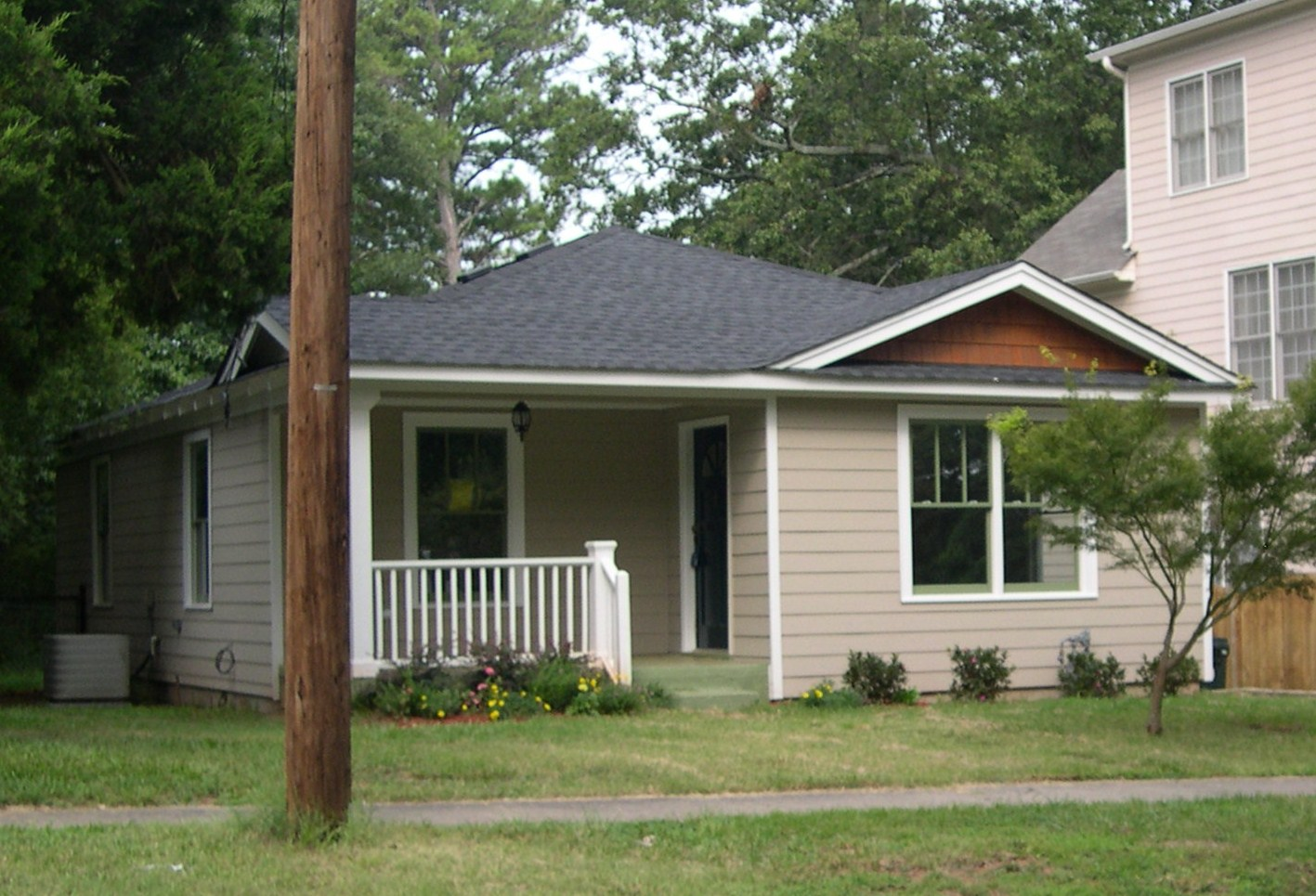
Typical Decatur Heights bungalow on Sycamore Drive with infill housing to the right

Decatur Heights is a historic community located in the northeast corner of the Atlanta, Georgia suburb of Decatur. It includes residences, churches and a nature preserve. During much of the 20th Century, this community primarily consisted modest homes. However, in the 1990s it became a neighborhood where “tear downs” were increasingly common. This has resulted in the demolition of the modest cottages the community was historically known for.

Decatur Heights is accessed off of East Ponce de Leon Avenue to the south, Church Street to the north and Winn Way to the east. The approximate boundaries of the community are Glennwood Estates to the west; Winn Way to the east; the Dekalb Medical Center to the north; Church Street to the northeast; and Ponce de Leon Avenue to the south. The Avondale MARTA station is located immediately south of the community.

The community includes several distinct neighborhoods, each constructed in different decades. (Decatur Heights is commonly referred to as the community's name, but it is also the name of the oldest neighborhood within the community.) The neighborhoods located with the City of Decatur include Decatur Heights, Sycamore Ridge and Sycamore Station. The Springdale Heights neighborhood is also part of the Decatur Heights community, but is located in unincorporated DeKalb County. However, the City of Decatur began investigating annexation of Springdale Heights in 2008. The heart of the community and primary north–south road is Sycamore Drive. The geographic heart of the historic neighborhood is generally considered to be Sycamore Drive and Fairview Street. A country store, which was originally constructed as a residence, was located at the southwest corner of this intersection. The store was also torn down and replaced with a single family home.

== History ==
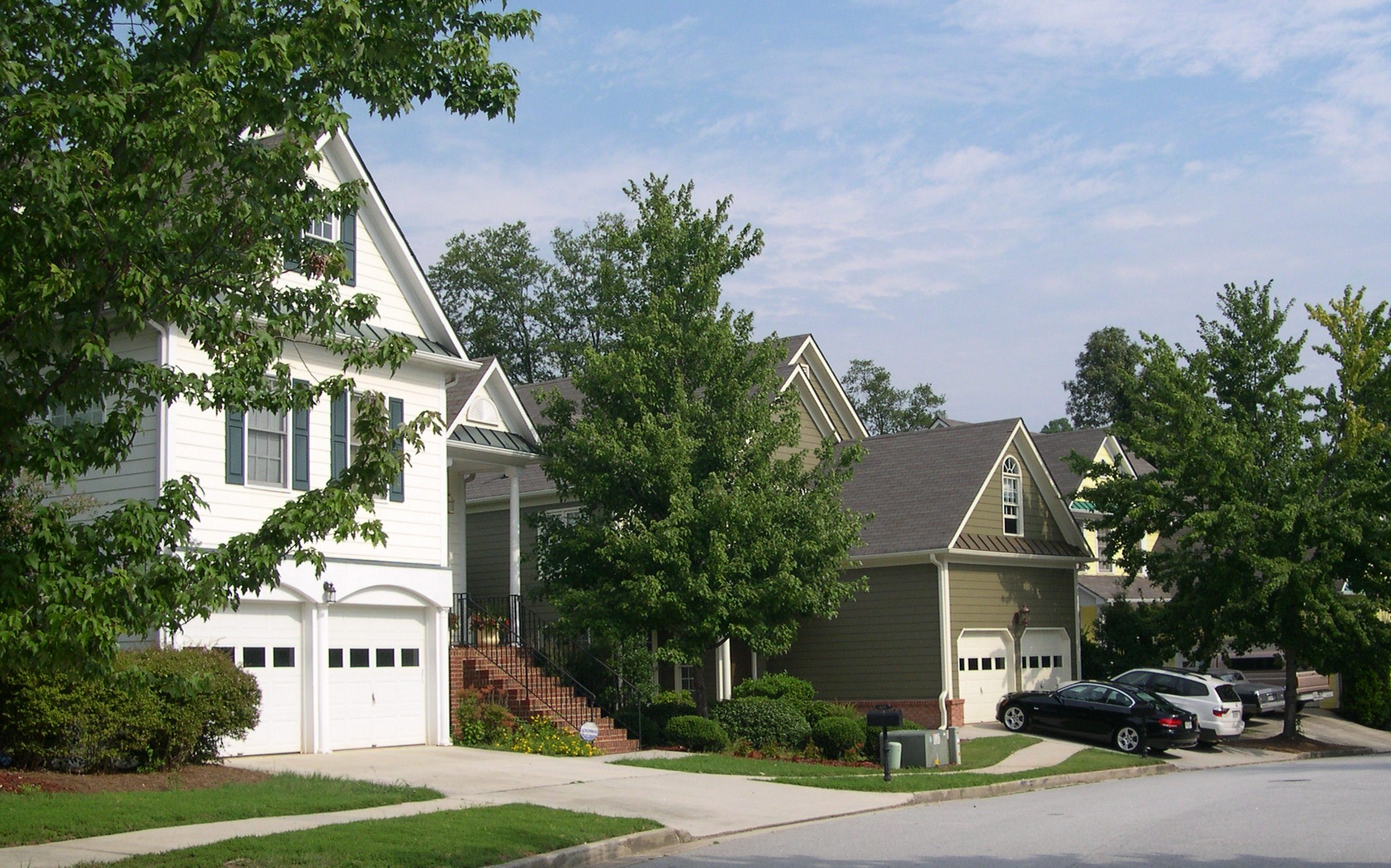
Streetscape of Sycamore Ridge, a new upscale urban subdivision in historic Decatur Heights

The Decatur Heights subdivision is the oldest part of the community. It was developed by Homer C. Lord of the Georgia Land & Investment Company between 1910 and 1928. It primarily includes the streets on the east and west side of Sycamore Drive in the south and west-central (Ridgeland Ave.) part of the community. In addition to Sycamore Drive, the original streets included Ridgeland Avenue, Fairview Street, Pinehurst Street, Hillcrest, Poplar, Oakdale, Grove Street, Woodland and Covington Roads Sycamore Court townhomes are located within Decatur Heights.

The Springdale Heights subdivision, also located on the east and west sides of Sycamore Street, anchors the north end of the community. It was developed in two stages. The residences close to Sycamore Drive were developed in the late 1940s, and include sidewalks which link to Decatur Heights. The residences in the back portion of the east side of Sycamore Street were developed in 1953, but the sidewalks were omitted and the homes are larger 1950s vintage, ranch-style houses. There is a neighborhood tradition that Bridlewood Drive was part of a horse bridle path used by Agnes Scott College students. In addition to Bridlewood Circle, the streets include Poplar Lane Way, Pineview Drive, Woodhaven Drive and North Pineview Court DeKalb Medical Center - North borders this subdivision on the north and east sides. Church Street Manor, a cluster subdivision, borders Springdale Heights on the west side.

The Sycamore Station townhome development was constructed in phases in the 1980s and 1990s. It was built on a small farm located between Springdale Heights and Sycamore Ridge. The farmhouse is now the clubhouse for the development.

Sycamore Ridge is a totally new development in Decatur Heights, and this subdivision has the greatest concentration of affluent homes in the community. It was constructed in the late 1990s and early 2000, and consists of large homes on small, urban lots. At the time of the development, certain lots fell outside Decatur and were annexed into the city. The name “ridge”, however, is inaccurate. Sycamore Street is the “ridge” in the community, and the Sycamore Ridge development falls off to the east. In addition to the main street of Sycamore Ridge, streets include Winburn Court, Fitzgerald Court, Renfroe Court, Pinehurst Sttreet, the northern leg of Lockwood Terrace and the eastern leg of Fairview Street.

== Churches ==
- North Decatur United Methodist Church (UMC), 1523 Church Street.
- The Church at Decatur Heights (SBC), 735 Sycamore Drive.

== Parks ==
- Glenn Creek Nature Preserve, Fairview Street. A 2-acre (8,100 m^{2}) nature preserve purchased in 2004, and located between Glennwood Estates and Decatur Heights. The primary entrance to the preserve is at the end of Fairview Street in Decatur Heights. Glenn Creek bisects the site - running from the SE to the NW. There are walking paths within the preserve, and a clearing in the center of the preserve. The preserve is open to the public by appointment, but has a calendar of events on their website. "Glenn Creek" was known as "Hunter's Branch" in the 19th century, named after a C.S.A. Colonel Hunter who owned property in the vicinity.

== Transportation ==
- Ponce de Leon Avenue, is located south of the neighborhood, and is the primary entry point from Atlanta.
- Avondale MARTA rail station, is immediately south of the neighborhood.
- Church Street, is located north of the neighborhood, and is the primary entry point from Interstate 285. This street used to be known as "Old Lawrenceville Highway".
- Winn Way, is located east of the neighborhood, but is a secondary entrance through the Sycamore Ridge subdivision.
