= Decatur, Georgia =

- City
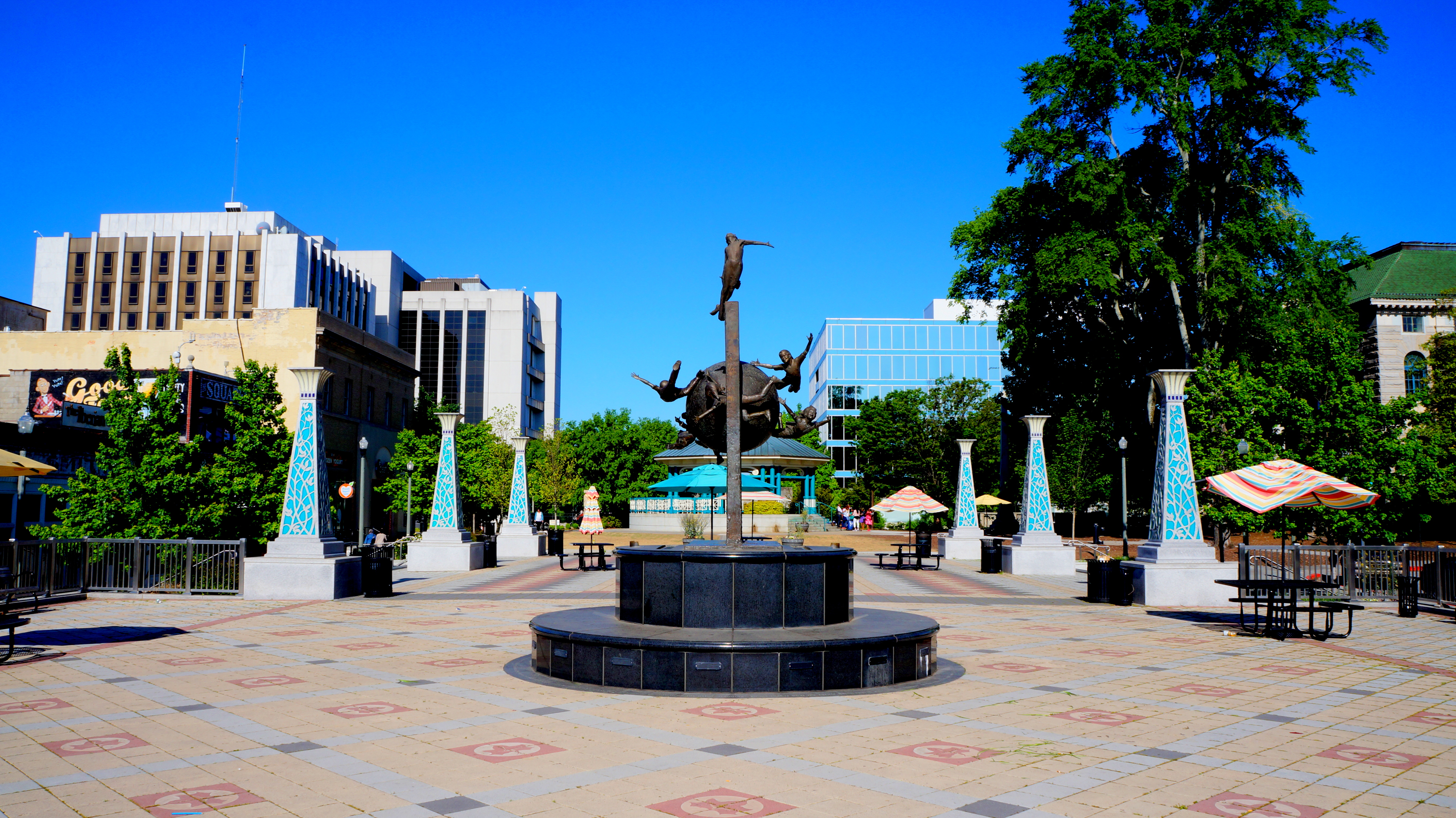
- Decatur Square

- Logo
- Motto(s): "A City of Homes, Schools and Places of Worship"
- Coordinates: 33°46′17″N 84°17′52″W
- Country: United States
- State: Georgia
- County: DeKalb
- Incorporated: December 10, 1823; 202 years ago
- Named for: Commodore Stephen Decatur

Government
  - Type: Commission–Manager
  - Commission: Decatur City Commission
  - Mayor: Tony Powers

Area
  - Total: 4.60 sq mi (11.92 km^{2})
  - Land: 4.60 sq mi (11.91 km^{2})
  - Water: 0.0039 sq mi (0.01 km^{2})
- Elevation: 1,043 ft (318 m)

Population (2020)
  - Total: 24,928
  - Density: 5,422.8/sq mi (2,093.77/km^{2})
- Time zone: UTC-5 (Eastern (EST))
  - Summer (DST): UTC-4 (EDT)
- ZIP code(s): 30030, 30032, 30033
- Area codes: 404, 678 and 470
- FIPS code: 13-22052
- GNIS feature ID: 0331532
- Major airport: ATL
- Website: decaturga.com

Decatur (/dəˈkeɪtər/) is a city in and the county seat of DeKalb County, Georgia, United States, part of the Atlanta metropolitan area. With a population of 24,928 in the 2020 census, the municipality is sometimes assumed to be larger since multiple ZIP Codes in unincorporated DeKalb County bear Decatur as the address.

The city is served by three MARTA rail stations (Decatur, East Lake, and Avondale). The city is located approximately five miles (eight kilometers) northeast of Downtown Atlanta and shares its western border with both the city of Atlanta (the Kirkwood and Lake Claire neighborhoods) and unincorporated DeKalb County. The Druid Hills neighborhood is to the northwest of Decatur.

== History ==
=== Early history ===
Prior to European settlement, the Decatur area was largely forested (a remnant of old-growth forest near Decatur is preserved as Fernbank Forest). Decatur was established at the intersection of two Native American trails: the Sandtown, which led east from the Chattahoochee River at Utoy Creek, and the Shallowford, which follows today's Clairmont Road, and eventually crossed near Roswell. A site for the DeKalb County courthouse was designated in 1822 in what would become downtown Decatur; the city of Decatur was incorporated on December 10, 1823. It was named for United States Navy Commodore Stephen Decatur.

The first settler in the area were farmers or skilled tradesmen of English, Scottish and Irish descent.

=== American Civil War ===
During the American Civil War, Decatur became a strategic site in Sherman's Atlanta campaign. In July 1864, Major-General James McPherson occupied the town to cut off the Confederates' supply line from Augusta. On July 22, during the Battle of Atlanta, Confederate cavalry under Major-General Joseph Wheeler attacked McPherson's supply wagons and the Union troops left to defend the wagons. A historical marker at the old courthouse marks the site of this skirmish.

We attacked Decatur on the 22d and took the town driving out a Brigade of Infantry and a good deal of Dismounted Cavalry. Our Brigade really took the town, tho' it was supported on both flanks by a Brigade of Cavalry dismounted. The fight lasted about two hours and was very hot for a while. The Yankees had the hills and houses on us and fought very well for a time. Our dash was made to distract attention while Hardee made the real attack on the enemy's flank. We captured over a hundred prisoners and killed and wounded about one hundred and fifty. Our loss about seventy killed and wounded.

— Captain W. L. Nugent, in a letter to his wife

=== 20th century ===
In the second half of the twentieth century the metropolitan area of Atlanta expanded into unincorporated DeKalb County, eventually surrounding two sides of the town of Decatur. Concurrently, the area experienced white flight, as many residents fled to more distant suburbs. The 1960s and 1970s witnessed dramatic drops in property values. However, more recently the city has regained economic vigor, partially thanks to several long-term downtown development plans that have come to fruition, making Decatur a trendy small mixed-use district with easy transit to downtown Atlanta. Over the past twenty years, it has gained a local and national reputation as a progressive city with a high level of citizen involvement. In the early 2000’s, Decatur and East Atlanta had a reputation for LGBTQ-centricity. Because of gentrification, the city has now been attracting more straight young urban professionals instead.

== Geography ==
According to the United States Census Bureau, the city has a total area of 4.2 square miles (11 square kilometers), all land. Decatur is bordered by Avondale Estates to the southeast and Atlanta to the southwest, and unincorporated DeKalb County elsewhere.

The Eastern Continental Divide bisects the city along the CSX (formerly Georgia Railroad) trackage right of way.

=== Neighborhoods and historic districts ===
- Adair Park
- Chelsea Heights
- Clairemont - Great Lakes and Clairemont Historic District
- Clairemont Gateway Association
- Decatur Heights
- College Heights
- Dearborn Heights
- Downtown Decatur
- Emory Parc Manor
- EverGreen Forest
- Glennwood Estates
- Lenox Place
- MAK Historic District
- Midway Woods
- Oakhurst
- Parkwood
- Ponce de Leon Heights
- Ponce de Leon Court Historic District
- Ridgeland Park
- South Candler Street-Agnes Scott College Historic District
- Sycamore Street
- Westchester Hills
- Winnona Park Historic District

== Demographics ==
Decatur, Georgia – Racial and ethnic composition Note: the US Census treats Hispanic/Latino as an ethnic category. This table excludes Latinos from the racial categories and assigns them to a separate category. Hispanics/Latinos may be of any race.
Race / Ethnicity (NH = Non-Hispanic)	Pop 2000	Pop 2010	Pop 2020	% 2000	% 2010	% 2020
White alone (NH)	11,733	13,806	16,796	64.66%	71.40%	67.38%
Black or African American alone (NH)	5,505	3,858	3,839	30.34%	19.95%	15.40%
Native American or Alaska Native alone (NH)	29	36	36	0.16%	0.19%	0.14%
Asian alone (NH)	296	554	1,317	1.63%	2.87%	5.28%
Native Hawaiian or Pacific Islander alone (NH)	6	9	12	0.03%	0.05%	0.05%
Other race alone (NH)	56	44	153	0.31%	0.23%	0.61%
Mixed race or Multiracial (NH)	218	416	1,481	1.20%	2.15%	5.94%
Hispanic or Latino (any race)	304	612	1,294	1.68%	3.17%	5.19%
Total	18,147	19,335	24,928	100.00%	100.00%	100.00%

Historical population
Census	Pop.	Note	%±
1840	530		—
1850	744		40.4%
1870	401		—
1880	639		59.4%
1890	1,013		58.5%
1900	1,418		40.0%
1910	2,466		73.9%
1920	6,150		149.4%
1930	13,276		115.9%
1940	16,561		24.7%
1950	21,635		30.6%
1960	22,026		1.8%
1970	21,943		−0.4%
1980	18,404		−16.1%
1990	17,304		−6.0%
2000	18,147		4.9%
2010	19,335		6.5%
2020	24,928		28.9%
2025 (est.)	25,276	▲	1.4%
U.S. Decennial Census; 2010–2020; 2025

=== 2020 census ===
As of the 2020 census, Decatur had a population of 24,928. The median age was 39.5 years. 28.4% of residents were under the age of 18 and 13.6% of residents were 65 years of age or older. For every 100 females there were 82.4 males, and for every 100 females age 18 and over there were 74.6 males age 18 and over.

100.0% of residents lived in urban areas, while 0.0% lived in rural areas.

There were 9,946 households in Decatur, of which 40.4% had children under the age of 18 living in them. Of all households, 48.6% were married-couple households, 14.7% were households with a male householder and no spouse or partner present, and 32.7% were households with a female householder and no spouse or partner present. About 32.7% of all households were made up of individuals and 14.6% had someone living alone who was 65 years of age or older.

There were 11,205 housing units, of which 11.2% were vacant. The homeowner vacancy rate was 1.5% and the rental vacancy rate was 18.2%.

Racial composition as of the 2020 census
Race	Number	Percent
White	17,100	68.6%
Black or African American	3,896	15.6%
American Indian and Alaska Native	54	0.2%
Asian	1,323	5.3%
Native Hawaiian and Other Pacific Islander	12	0.0%
Some other race	362	1.5%
Two or more races	2,181	8.7%
Hispanic or Latino (of any race)	1,294	5.2%

=== Diversity trends ===
In recent decades, the city of Decatur has become markedly less diverse in racial terms. In 1990, the city's population was nearly 40 percent African American. By 2010, it had dropped to 20 percent African American, and by 2020 it dropped further to 15.6 percent African American. Between 1990 and 2020, the proportion of the town's population that was white rose from 60 to 67 percent. One exception to this trend is the fact that Decatur's Latino and Asian populations were minuscule in 1990, and though they each only represented just 5 percent of the town's population in 2020, their increases in proportional terms over the thirty-year period were significant.

== Education ==
=== Primary and secondary schools ===
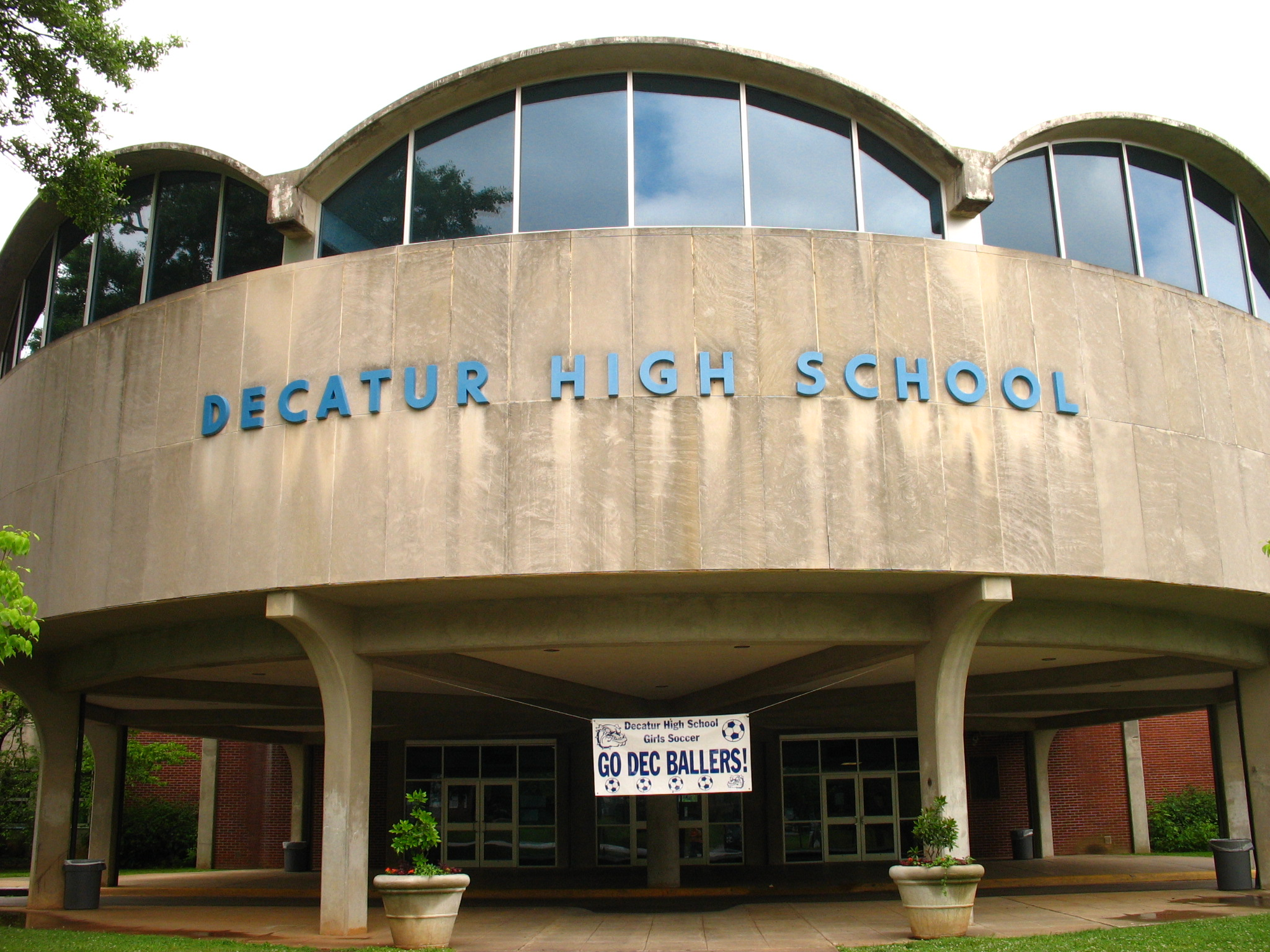
Decatur High School

City Schools of Decatur, which serves only students within the city limits, holds pre-school to grade twelve, and consists of a pre-K early childhood learning center, five lower elementary schools, two upper elementary schools, a middle school, and a high school. Decatur High School is the district's sole high school. The Decatur City district has 224 full-time teachers and over 5,700 students from pre-K through grade 12.

The DeKalb County School District serves unincorporated DeKalb County.

The Roman Catholic Archdiocese of Atlanta operates Saint Thomas More Catholic School in Decatur; it opened on September 1, 1950. At first it only had elementary grades and its initial enrollment was 150. A dedicated elementary building opened in 1955, and an addition for kindergarten classes with two rooms was placed in 1994. St. Peter Claver Regional School has a Decatur mailing address but is in nearby Candler-McAfee CDP.

=== Colleges and universities ===
- Agnes Scott College
- Columbia Theological Seminary
- Georgia State University's Perimeter College
- DeVry University
- Emory University, northwest of Decatur, was located in unincorporated DeKalb County before being annexed by the City of Atlanta in 2017.

=== Public libraries ===
The DeKalb County Public Library system operates the Decatur Branch and is also the Dekalb County Library Headquarters.

== Government ==
Presidential election results

Presidential election results in Decatur
Year	Democratic	Republican	Others
2020	88.6% 14,095	10.3% 1,633	1.2% 184
2016	85.0% 11,036	11.4% 1,476	3.7% 474

Decatur has operated under a Commission-Manager form of government since 1920. The Charter of the City of Decatur establishes the City Commission as the governing and legislative authority of the City government. A five-member City Commission is elected for four-year terms on two-year cycles. Two members are elected from the south side of the city, two from the north side and one is elected at-large. At their organizational meeting each January, the Commissioners elect a mayor and mayor-pro-tem from among their own membership for a one-year term. The mayor is not a separate elected office. The current mayor is Tony Powers. Previous mayors have included Leslie Jasper Steele (1915).

The Commission appoints a professional City Manager to carry out the policies, directives and day-to-day business of the city. The current city manager is Andrea Arnold. There are also several citizen volunteer boards and commissions appointed by the City Commission, including the Planning Commission, the Zoning Board of Appeals, and the Historic Preservation Commission.

Multiple DeKalb County facilities are outside the city limits and have Decatur post office addresses. They include the DeKalb County Sheriff's Office (including the county jail), DeKalb County Solid Waste Management, and the DeKalb County Animal Services Animal Enforcement Division.

=== State representation ===
The Georgia Department of Juvenile Justice has its headquarters in Avondale Estates, near Decatur. The Georgia Bureau of Investigation has its headquarters near Decatur, in an unincorporated area.

=== Federal representation ===
The United States Postal Service operates the Decatur Post Office.

== Culture ==
=== Festivals, special events and arts ===
Decatur has a significant art and festival scene. The Decatur Arts Alliance hosts the Decatur Arts Festival each May, in addition to installing public art around the city, providing gallery space for local artists, producing YEA!, which is an event for emerging young artists, and supporting arts and arts education throughout the city.

Decatur holds the annual AJC Decatur Book Festival, which claims to be one of the largest independent book festivals in the United States. It has featured thousands of famous authors, book signings, speeches, and attracted upwards of 85,000 people in 2019.

Decatur is home to Eddie's Attic, which is a live music venue hosting shows almost every night.

Decatur is known for its frequent festivals, which include the annual Decatur Arts Festival, Summer In The city, Decatur BBQ, Blues & Bluegrass Festival, the Decatur Book Festival, the Decatur Maker's Faire, The Decatur Craft Beer Festival and the Decatur Wine Festival. Other events throughout the year include parades, Concerts on the Square, wine crawls, art walks, runs, and races.

Public art in Decatur includes Celebration (artist Gary Price), Valentine (artist George Lundeen), Commodore Stephen Decatur (artist unknown), Roy A. Blount Plaza, and Living Walls Murals (various artists).

=== Dining, breweries and distilleries ===
Decatur is known for its food scene and was named one of the South's "Tastiest Towns" in 2012. In 2016, the New York Times called it "Atlanta's gastronomic equivalent of Berkeley or Brooklyn".

=== Points of interest ===
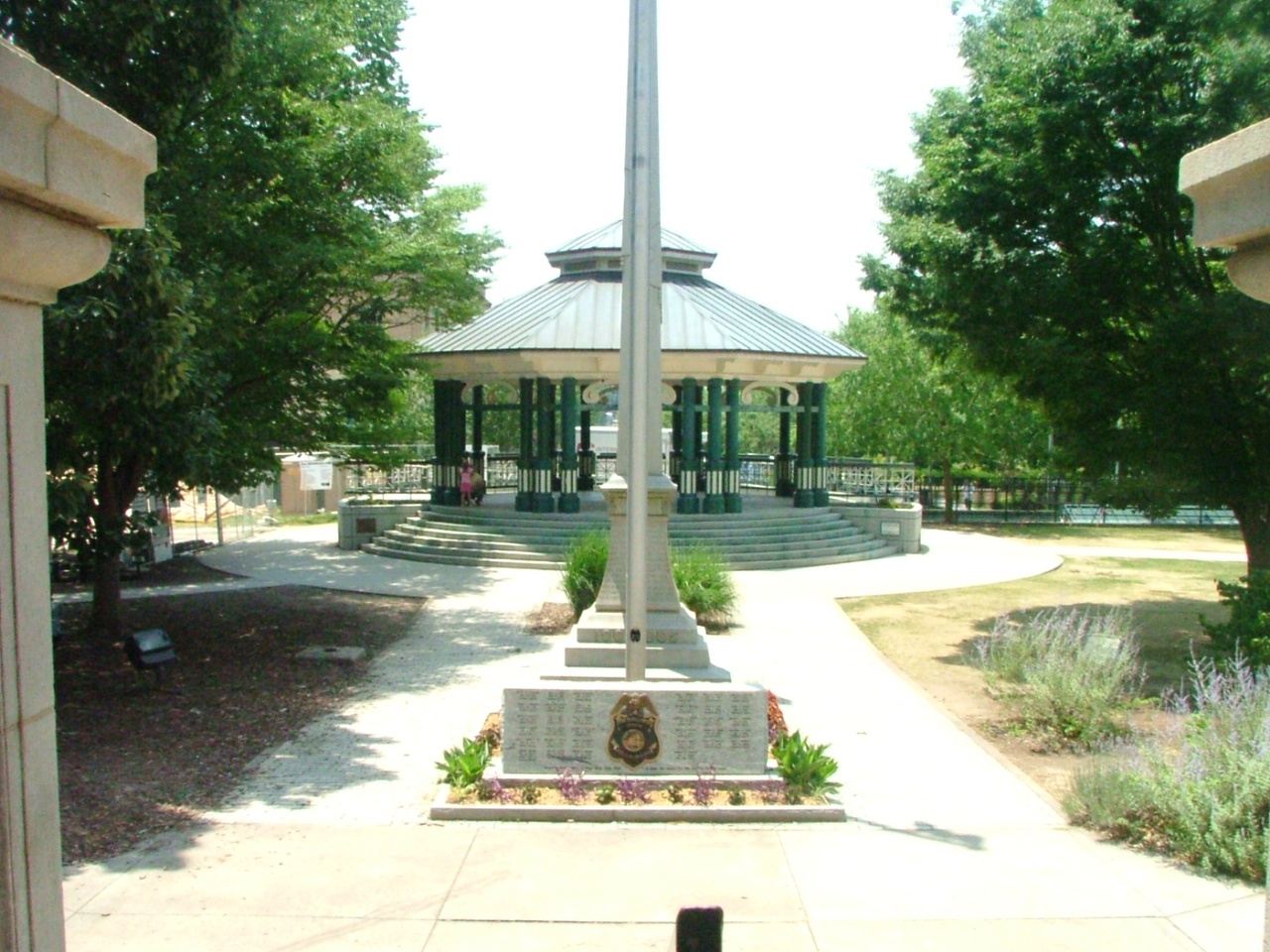
The Decatur Square gazebo from the old courthouse steps, prior to the removal of the Confederate monument

Decatur's downtown area and residential neighborhoods are filled with historic structures and sites of interest. This list primarily consists of structures on the National Register of Historic Places, but many remain privately owned and may only be viewed from the exterior.

- South Candler Street-Agnes Scott College Historic District, 141 East College Avenue. This district is on the National Register of Historic Places. It includes both the college campus and surrounding historic homes, and is book-ended by the Winnona Park Historic District to the east and the MAK Historic District to the west.
- Clairemont Historic District, north of Decatur Square
- Columbia Theological Seminary, 701 Columbia Drive. This tree-lined, brick and limestone campus lies within Decatur's Winnona Park neighborhood.
- Decatur Cemetery, 229 Bell Street. This historic cemetery was founded in the early 19th century and is located northeast of Decatur Square.
- Glenwood Elementary, the oldest school in the city
- Historic DeKalb County Courthouse, located in the original Decatur Square.
- Historic Oakhurst, in southwest Decatur. An early 20th century town annexed by Decatur, Oakhurst still has its own business district surrounded by bungalows.
- MAK Historic District, McDonough, Adams and Kings Highway. Decatur's first local historic district is full of early 20th century American Craftsman-style homes and has been used by Hollywood for films.
- Methodist Chapel, Commerce Avenue and Sycamore Street. A granite chapel on historic Sycamore Street owned by Decatur First United Methodist Church.
- Old Scottish Rite Hospital, 321 West Hill Street (Oakhurst neighborhood). The historic Shriners' hospital has had an adaptive reuse and now houses restaurants and an art gallery.
- Ponce de Leon Court Historic District. A single street of bungalows and palm trees east of Decatur Square (off Ponce de Leon Avenue).
- Winnona Park Historic District, in southeast Decatur. This district is on the National Register of Historic Places for its residences and is also the home of Columbia Theological Seminary.
- Woodlands Garden, 932 Scott Boulevard. Seven acres, mostly wooded with a focus on native plants, and open to the public.

== Transportation ==
=== Major roads and expressways ===
- US 78
- SR 155
- US 278

Decatur is 'inside the perimeter' (I-285) and north of I-20.

=== Mass transit ===
- Avondale MARTA Station
- Decatur MARTA Station
- East Lake MARTA Station

=== Pedestrians and cycling ===
PATH Foundation trails

- Stone Mountain Trail
- Decatur PATH
- East Decatur Greenway

== Notable people ==
- Lloyd – singer
- B.o.B. – rapper, singer, songwriter
- James Banks III (born 1998) – basketball player
- Jarren Benton – rapper
- Frank Broyles – Coach and athletic director at University of Arkansas
- Harrison Butker – NFL placekicker for the Kansas City Chiefs
- Jason Carter – politician
- Mark David Chapman – killed John Lennon
- Paul Delaney (born 1986) – basketball player in the Israeli National League
- Sania Feagin – WNBA player
- Rebecca Latimer Felton – first woman Senator
- Ian Garrison – professional cyclist
- Ghetto Mafia – hip hop group
- Omari Hardwick – actor
- Keri Hilson – singer, actress
- Kiera Hogan – professional wrestler
- Jan Hooks (1957–2014) – actor and comedian
- Chris Horton (born 1994) – basketball player for Hapoel Tel Aviv of the Israeli Basketball Premier League
- Joshilyn Jackson – author
- Emily Jacobson (born 1985) – saber fencer
- Jacquees – singer, songwriter
- DeForest Kelley – actor, screenwriter, poet, and singer
- Alec Kann – professional soccer player
- LightSkinKeisha – rapper
- McClain – girl group
- China Anne McClain – actress, singer
- Sierra McClain – actress, singer
- S.P. Miskowski – author
- Jason Moore – soccer player
- Efrain Morales – soccer player for Atlanta United
- Matthew O'Brien – author and activist
- Amy Ray (born 1964) – singer, songwriter, Indigo Girls
- Will Reilly (born 2002) – soccer player
- Joey Rosskopf – professional cyclist
- A. E. Stallings – poet and critic, first American Professor of Poetry at the University of Oxford
- Michael Stipe – lead vocalist, R.E.M.
- Baby Tate – rapper, singer
- Seth Tepfer – dance caller and writer
- Gwen Torrence – sprinter and three-time Olympic gold medalist
- Andrew Toles – outfielder for the Los Angeles Dodgers
- Rock Ya-Sin – NFL cornerback for the Baltimore Ravens
- Jordan Walker – MLB outfielder for the St. Louis Cardinals
- Devonte Wyatt – NFL defensive tackle for the Green Bay Packers
- Barry Bailey – Lead guitarist for the Atlanta Rhythm Section
- Michael Harris II - MLB center fielder for the Atlanta Braves, Rookie of the Year recipient

== Sister cities ==
Decatur has three sister cities, as designated by Sister Cities International, Inc. (SCI):

- Boussé, Burkina Faso
- Ouahigouya, Burkina Faso
- Trujillo, Peru

== See also ==
- List of municipalities in Georgia (U.S. state)
- National Register of Historic Places listings in DeKalb County, Georgia
