= Ridgeland Park =

Residential subdivision in Decatur, Georgia, US

Coordinates: 33.7890°N 84.2932°W

Ridgeland Park is a residential subdivision in Decatur, Georgia, USA

== Description ==
The neighborhood contains a mix of older and newer homes. The neighborhood lies partly within the city limits of Decatur and partly outside the city in unincorporated DeKalb County, Georgia. The streets include Willow Lane, Pensdale Road, Eastland Drive, Greylock Place, part of Scott Blvd and part of Medlock Rd. Ridgeland Park is bordered by Church Street to the south and Scott Boulevard to the north.

The Ridgeland Park Subdivision was constructed between 1946 and 1950. Many of the original homes still stand.

Ridgeland Park is close proximity to Emory University, Agnes Scott College, the Centers for Disease Control and Prevention and downtown Decatur.
