= Shriners Hospital for Crippled Children (Portland, Oregon) =

Former hospital in Portland, Oregon, U.S.

- Formerly listed on the U.S. National Register of Historic Places
- Main building at the hospital

- Location within Portland, Oregon
- Location: 8200 NE Sandy Blvd., Portland, Oregon
- Coordinates: 45°33′8″N 122°34′33″W
- Area: 9.9 acres (4.0 ha)
- Built: 1923
- Architect: Sutton & Whitney; Fritsch, Frederick A.
- Architectural style: Colonial Revival, Georgian Revival
- NRHP reference No.: 89001869

Significant dates
- Added to NRHP: October 30, 1989
- Removed from NRHP: June 8, 2011

The Shriners Hospital for Crippled Children, also known as Old Shriners Children's Hospital, was a historic building in Portland, Oregon, United States, built in 1923. It was designed in Colonial Revival style with aspects of the Georgian Revival style subtype. It was listed on the National Register of Historic Places in 1989, and removed in 2011, after being deconstructed in 2004. The hospital now known as Shriners Children's Portland moved to Marquam Hill in 1983, and the old site remained vacant until 2005, when it was demolished and an affordable living apartment complex, Columbia Knoll, was built on the site.

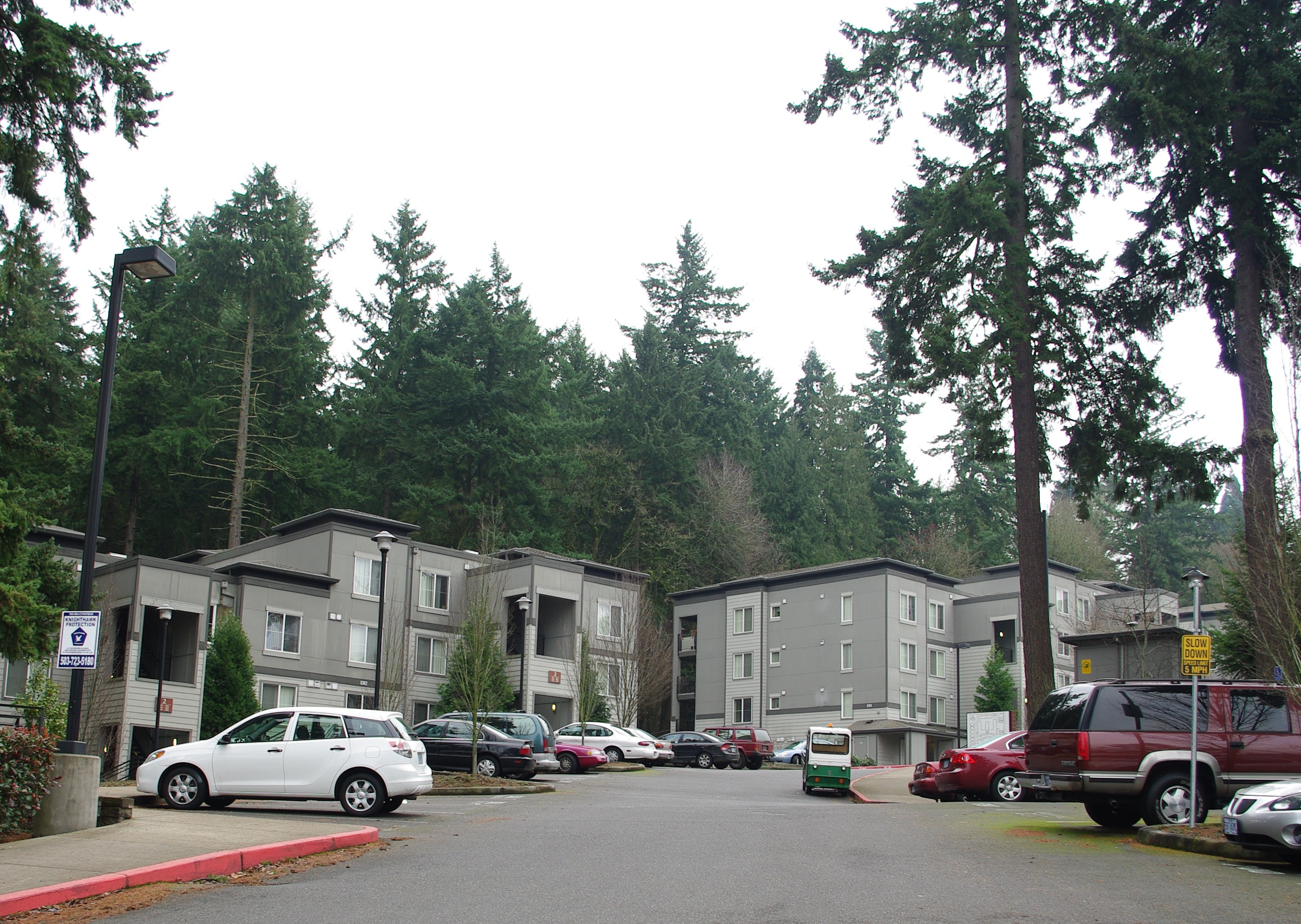
Apartment complex at the site of the former Shriners Hospital for Crippled Children.

== See also ==
- Shriners Hospitals for Children
- Old Scottish Rite Hospital building
