= Shriners, Lexington =

Shriners
- Neighborhood of Lexington, Kentucky
- Interactive map of Shriners
- Coordinates: 38.020°N 84.476°W
- Country: United States
- State: Kentucky
- County: Fayette
- City: Lexington

Area
  - Total: 0.452 sq mi (1.17 km^{2})
  - Water: 0 sq mi (0.0 km^{2})

Population (2000)
  - Total: 1,835
  - Density: 4,062/sq mi (1,568/km^{2})
- Time zone: UTC-5 (Eastern (EST))
  - Summer (DST): UTC-4 (EDT)
- ZIP code: 40502
- Area code: 859

Shriners is a neighborhood in southeastern Lexington, Kentucky, United States. It takes its name from the former Shriners Hospital for Children located within it. Its boundaries are Richmond Road to the east, Chinoe Road to the north, Cooper Drive to the west, and Lakeview Drive to the south.

== Neighborhood statistics ==
- Area: 0.452 square miles (1.17 km^{2})
- Population: 1,835
- Population density: 4,062 people per square mile
- Median household income: $71,584
