= Portland Aerial Tram =

Aerial tramway in Oregon, US

Coordinates: 45.499306°N 122.672578°W

- OHSU Tram
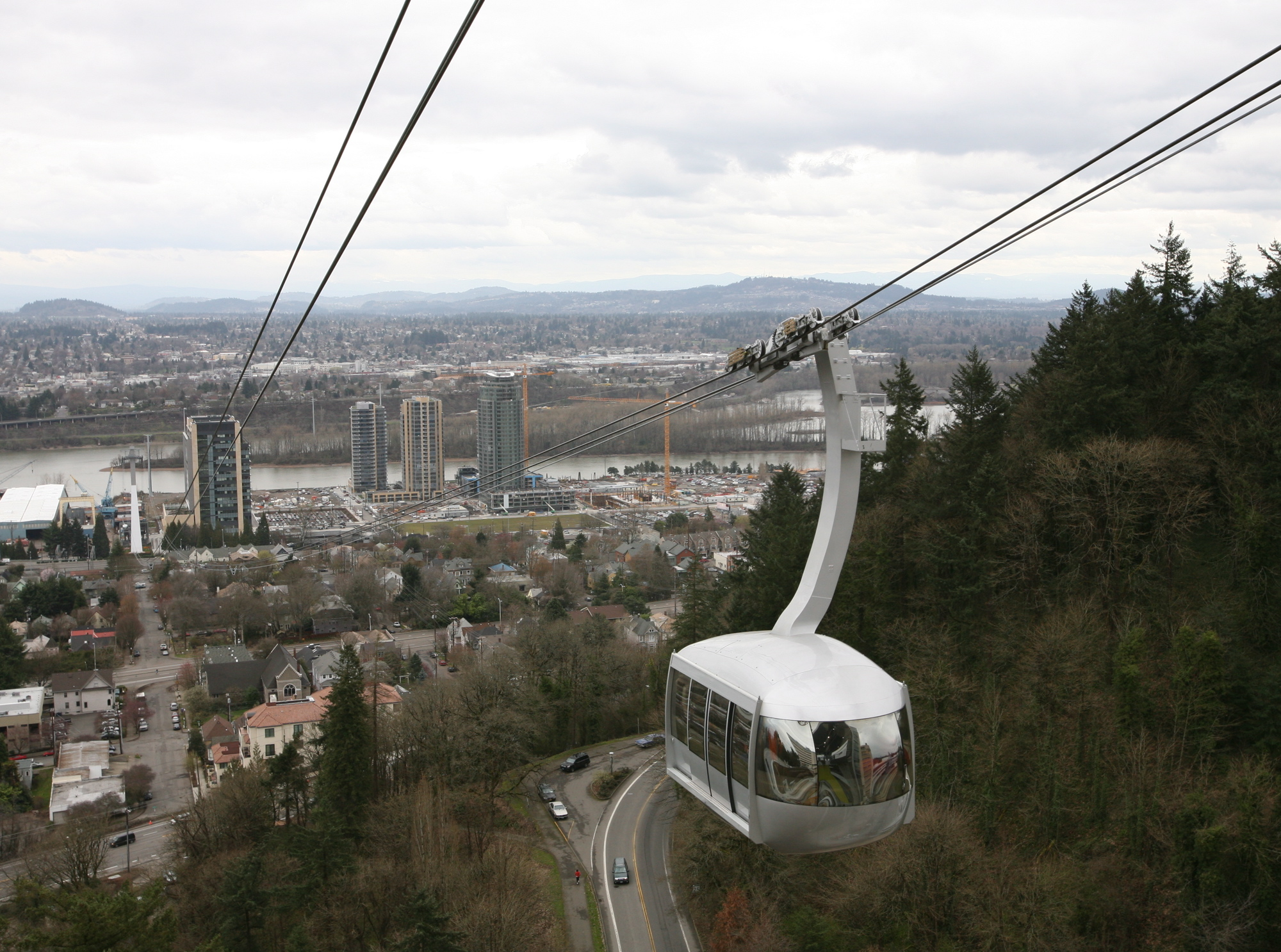
- The Portland Aerial Tram car nearing the upper station
- Interactive map of Portland Aerial Tram

Overview
- Status: Operational
- Character: Commuter
- Location: Portland, Oregon
- Country: United States
- Termini: South Waterfront neighborhood OHSU Hospital
- No. of stations: 2
- Open: December 15, 2006
- Website: gobytram.com

Operation
- Owner: City of Portland Government
- Operator: OHSU
- No. of carriers: 2
- Ridership: 1,240,428 in 2024.

Technical features
- Aerial lift type: Aerial tramway
- Manufactured by: Doppelmayr
- Operating speed: 22 mph (35 km/h)

The Portland Aerial Tram or OHSU Tram is an aerial tramway in Portland, Oregon, that connects the city's South Waterfront district and the main Oregon Health & Science University (OHSU) campus, located in the Marquam Hill neighborhood. It is one of only two commuter aerial tramways in the United States, the other being New York City's Roosevelt Island Tramway. The tram travels a horizontal distance of 3,300 feet (1,000 m) and a vertical distance of 500 feet (152 m) in a ride that lasts three minutes.

The tram was jointly funded by OHSU, the City of Portland, and by South Waterfront property owners, with most of the funding coming from OHSU. It is owned by the city and operated by OHSU. While most passengers are affiliated with OHSU, it is open to the public and operated as part of Portland's public transportation network that includes the Portland Streetcar, MAX Light Rail, and TriMet buses. After opening in December 2006, the tram carried its one millionth passenger on October 17, 2007 and its ten millionth rider on January 8, 2014. A round-trip ticket costs $9 but is free for OHSU patients and certain visitors; OHSU employees and students ride free by showing their ID badges.

The tram cost $57 million to build—a nearly fourfold increase over initial cost estimates, which was one of several sources of controversy concerning the project.

== Description ==
=== Route ===
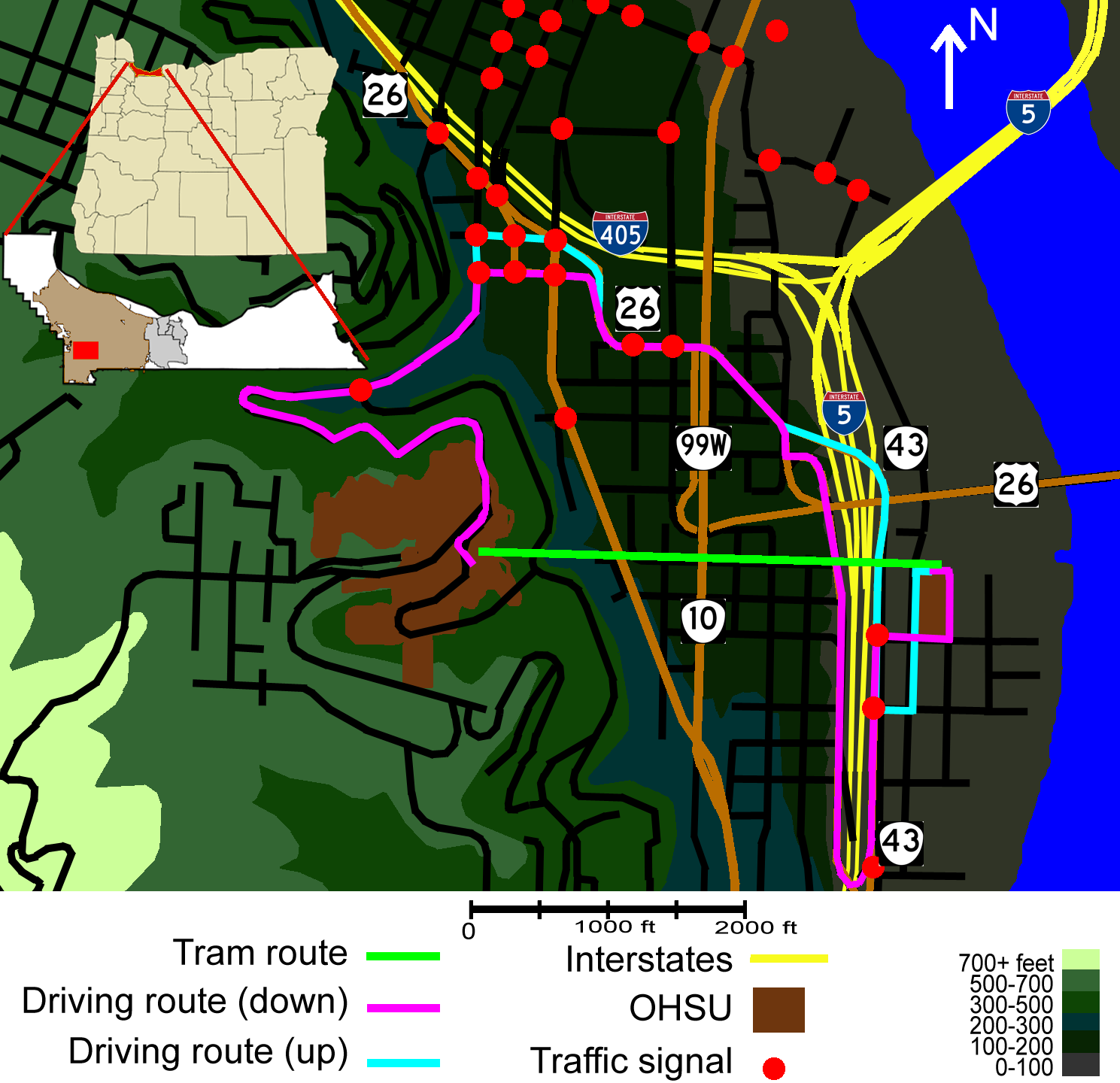
Route Tram route Driving route (down) Driving route (up) Interstate freeway OHSU campus Traffic signal / Elevation 700 feet (210 m) 500 feet (150 m) to 700 ft 300 feet (90 m) to 500 ft 200 feet (60 m) to 300 ft 100 feet (30 m) to 200 ft 0 to 100 ft; Tram's route goes over three major highways, an interstate, and several neighborhoods. Westbound driving route is cyan where it differs from the eastbound route.

The tram consists of two stations and a single intermediate tower. Two tram cars operate in a pendular mode on parallel track ropes and are pulled in unison by a haul rope which is driven by an engine at the lower terminal; when one car is at the upper terminal, the other is at the lower terminal, and vice versa. The lower station is located beside an OHSU facility in the South Waterfront neighborhood, adjacent to a stop on the Portland Streetcar line, which connects the South Waterfront neighborhood with downtown Portland. The upper station is located adjacent to OHSU Hospital, on the university's Marquam Hill campus. The two stations are exactly east and west of each other separated by a horizontal distance of 3,300 feet (5/8 mi; 1.0 km) and a vertical distance of 500 feet (152.4 m). The maximum vertical clearance between the tram and the ground is 175 feet (53.3 m).

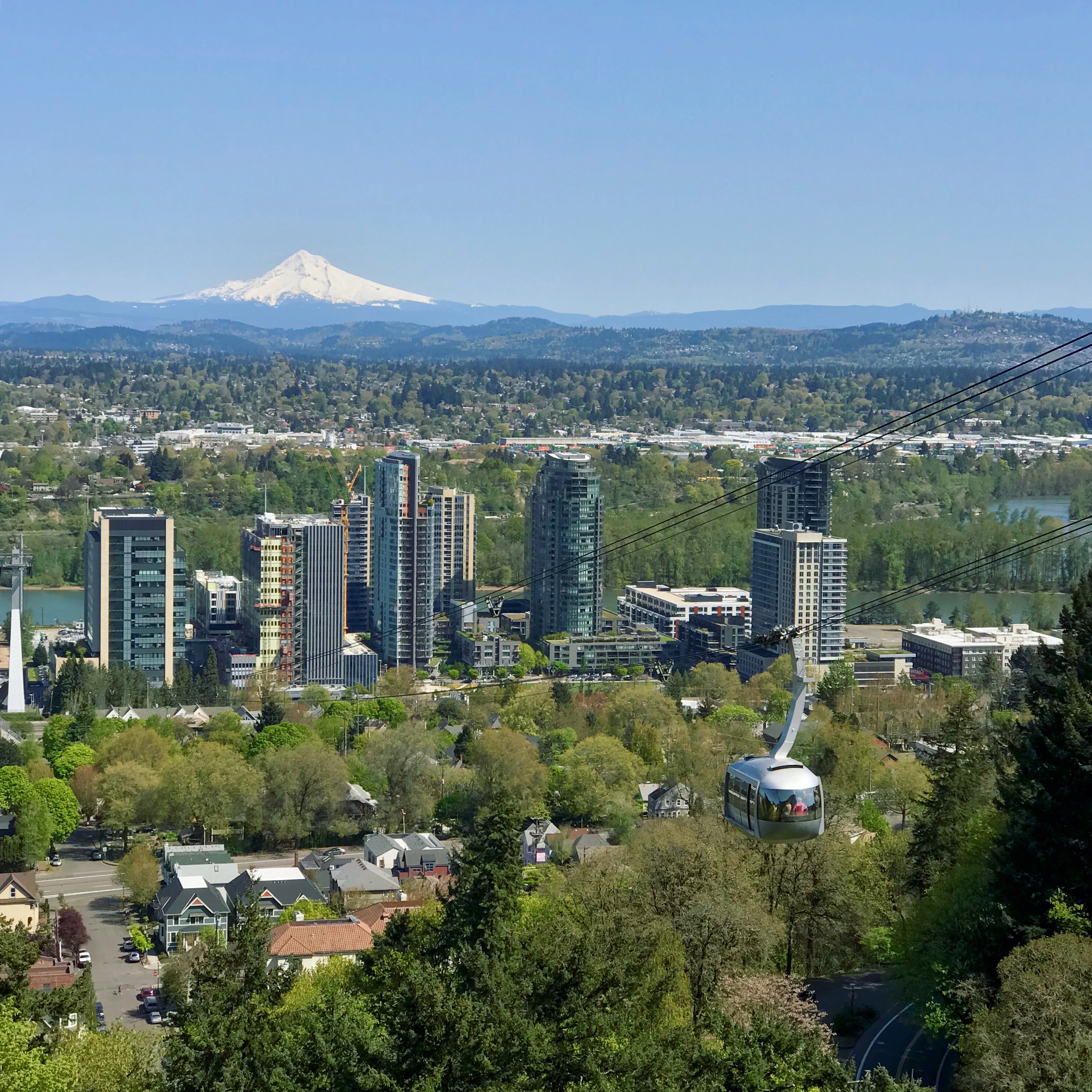
The Portland Aerial Tram as seen from Marquam Hill

The tram route crosses over Interstate 5 as well as major thoroughfares such as Barbur Boulevard, Oregon Route 10 (Naito Parkway), and Oregon Route 43 (Macadam Avenue). The intermediate tower is located east of Interstate 5 close to the South Waterfront station. As a result of this configuration, much of the journey is significantly elevated above the ground, making the tram easily visible for some distance, and providing tram riders with good views of the eastern metropolitan area and the Cascade Mountains of Oregon and Washington. The alternative to riding the tram is via public roadways which require a 1.9-mile (3.1 km) route with numerous stoplights and intersections. This route includes a short stretch of busy U.S. Route 26, as well as twisty Sam Jackson Park Road which ascends the side of the Tualatin Mountains to the hospital campus.

=== Structures and cabling ===
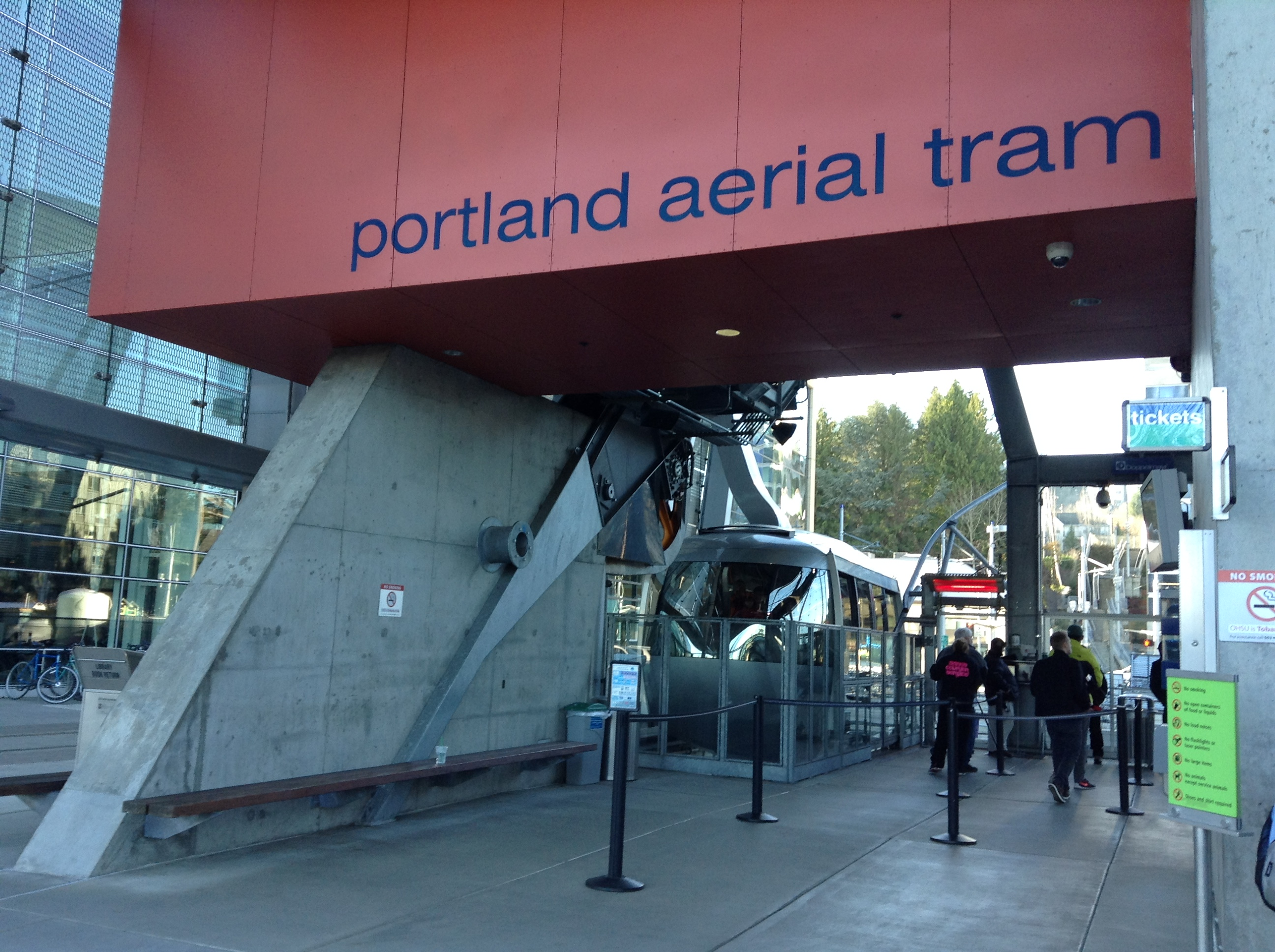
The terminal at South Waterfront

The lower (South Waterfront) station houses the tram's engines in a reinforced concrete basement and also has ticketing facilities and the control room.

The upper station is a freestanding steel and concrete tower 140 feet (42.7 m) above grade and houses the tram's counterweight. It is structurally separate from nearby OHSU Hospital and connects to the hospital's ninth floor via a skybridge over SW Campus Drive, which winds through the middle of the University. Structural separation between the tram and the hospital is necessary to avoid vibrations from tram machinery interfering with delicate microsurgery performed in the hospital.

The 197-foot (60 m) intermediate tower allows the tram to gain elevation quickly once leaving the lower station to provide adequate clearance over Interstate 5. The tower is 22 feet (6.7 m) wide and 20 feet (6.1 m) long at its base, 8 by 8 feet (2.4 by 2.4 m) at its narrowest point—nearly two-thirds up the tower—and 32 by 8 feet (9.8 by 2.4 m) at the top. It rests on a pier cap 5 feet (1.52 m) thick supported by 35 piers. The tower was fabricated in nearby Vancouver, Washington, and barged in three pieces up the Willamette River.

Nearly 1,250 short tons (1,120 long tons; 1,130 metric tons) of steel and 450 short tons (400 long tons; 410 t) of concrete are in the two platforms and the intermediate tower; the lateral loads on the upper platform range from 500,000 to 800,000 pounds-force (2,200,000 to 3,600,000 newtons) or 250 to 400 short tons-force (2,200,000 to 3,600,000 newtons).

Each tram car travels on a pair of 2-inch (51 mm) steel track ropes, totaling four cables. The track ropes combined are tensioned at over one million pounds-force (4,400,000 N). A fifth cable—the haul rope—is a continuous loop which winds around the drive bullwheel at the lower station, connects to one car, winds through a counterweighted bullwheel at the upper station, then to the other car, before joining itself. The haul rope length is over 7,000 feet (2,134 m).

=== Cars ===
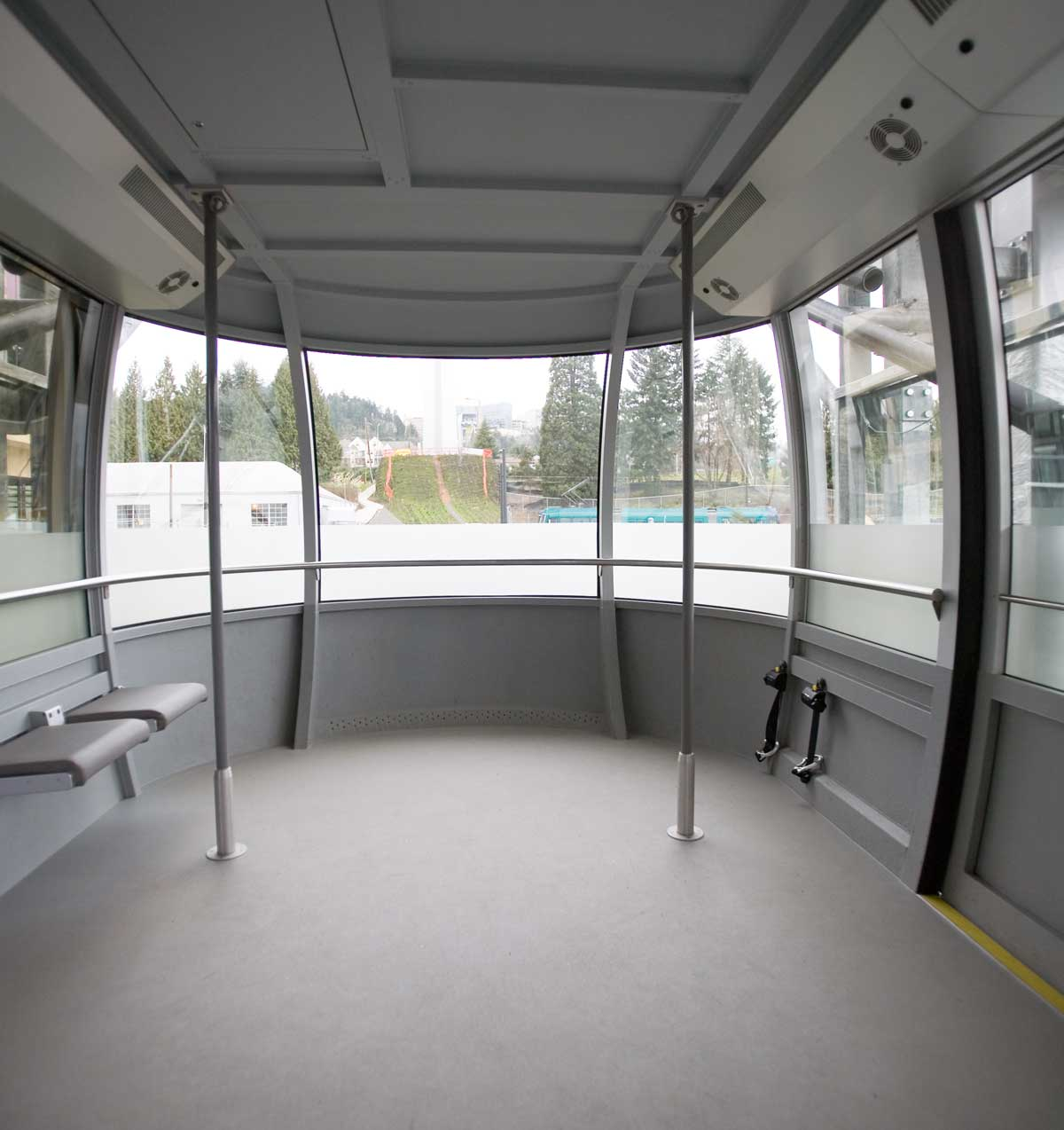
The Portland Aerial Tram's interior

The tram cars each weigh approximately 12 short tons (10.7 long tons; 10.9 metric tons), with cabin dimensions of 25 by 11 feet (7.62 by 3.35 m). Each car has a capacity of over 13 short tons (11.6 long tons; 11.8 t) and there is sufficient room in the cabin for 78 passengers and one operator. The tram cars were built by Gangloff AG, of Bern in Switzerland, and were shaped and painted to look like the architectural firm's vision of "bubbles floating through the sky". The surface of the cabins reflects and refracts light, minimizing their visual impact to the neighborhood underneath. The north and south cars are named Jean and Walt, respectively, after Jean Richardson, the first female engineering graduate from Oregon State University, and Walt Reynolds, the first African-American to graduate from OHSU, then known as the University of Oregon Medical School.

=== Drive and safety systems ===
The tram is propelled by three independent drive systems. The primary drive is a 450 kilowatts (600 hp) variable-frequency electric motor. Two hydrostatic diesel engines are also part of the design: one is a standby drive, permitting operation during a power outage; the other is an emergency evacuation drive. A 40-short-ton (35.7-long-ton; 36.3-metric-ton) counterweight offsets the weight of the cars. The tram is capable of operating at speeds up to 22 miles per hour (35 kilometers per hour) In addition to the redundant drive system, the tram has numerous other design features intended to ensure the safety of passengers and persons on the ground under its route. Communications systems permit the tram car operators to communicate with the control room. Automatic supervisory and control systems monitor the condition of the ropes and the drive systems. The tram was designed to safely operate in the earthquake-prone Pacific Northwest, with a structural design exceeding U.S earthquake standards, and operate in sustained winds of up to 50 miles per hour (80 km/h).

=== Operational information ===
The tram operates from Monday through Friday from 5:30 a.m. to 9:30 p.m. and on Saturdays from 9:00 a.m. to 5:00 p.m., Pacific Time. The tram is closed on Sundays and major holidays, except afternoon summer Sunday service is available. The tram is free for OHSU employees, students, and patients. TriMet, C-Tran, and Portland Streetcar monthly and annual passes are no longer honored. A ride on the tram normally lasts three minutes.

Transportation officials originally estimated the tram would carry over 1,500 people a day, a figure that was expected to rise to 5,500 by 2030. Those initial estimates proved to be conservative: the tram attracted one million riders in its first 10 1/2 months of operation, and averaged 10,000 riders per weekday as of 2016.

In March 2020, because of the COVID-19 pandemic, access to the tram was limited to employees of OHSU and affiliated institutions served by the tram and to patients. In May 2022, the tram reopened to the general public.

== History ==
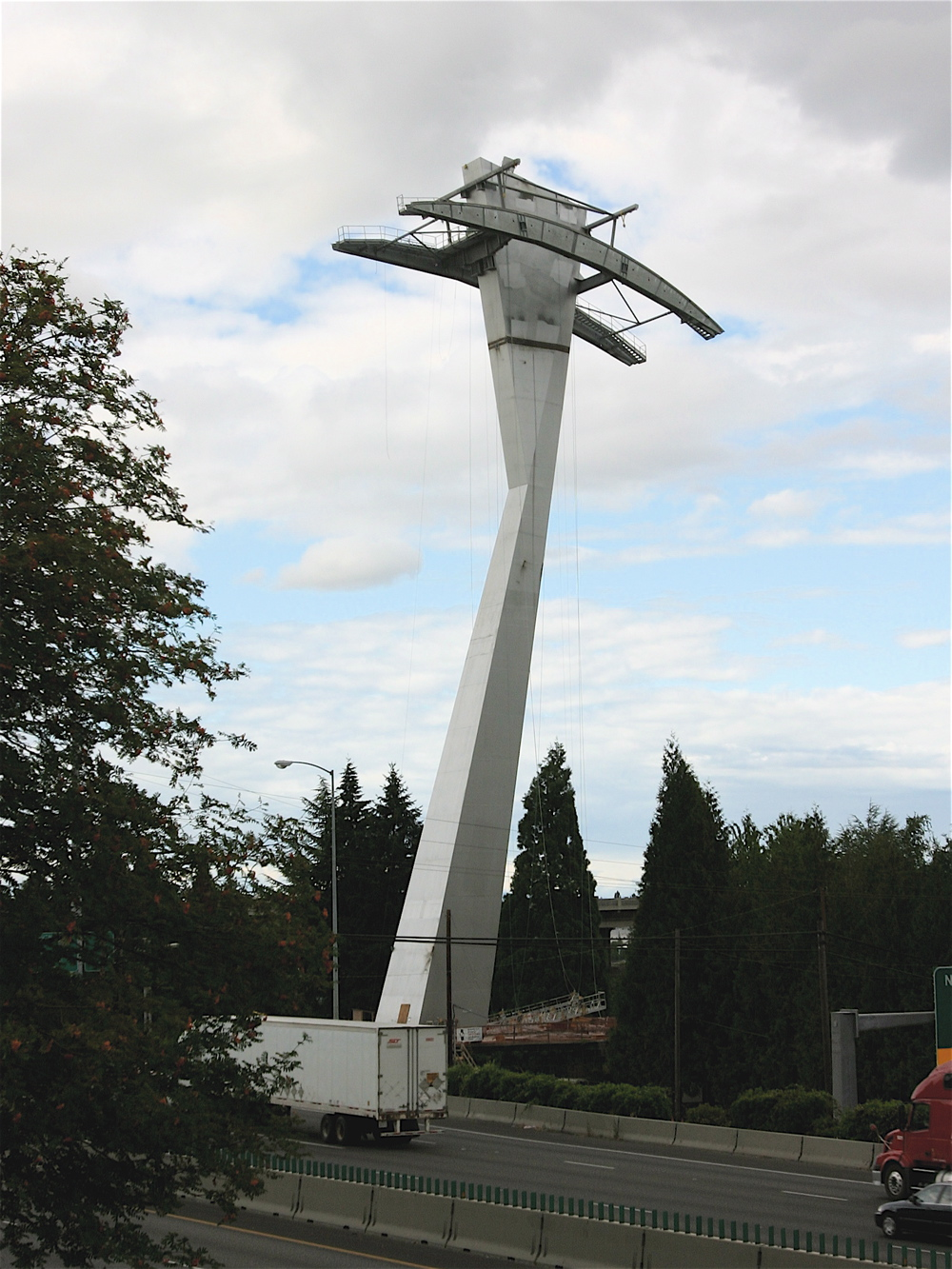
The intermediate tram support tower under construction. The tower is adjacent to the northbound lanes of Interstate 5.

In late 2001, OHSU purchased property in the South Waterfront (then known as North Macadam) area, with plans to expand there. After studying several ways, including shuttle buses, gondola lifts, tunnels, and even funiculars, to connect OHSU's primary campus on Marquam Hill with this area of planned expansion, the university sought city support of an aerial tram.

=== Planning and design ===
In early 2002, Portland Aerial Transportation, Inc. (PATI) was formed as a non-profit board. One of its first public actions was to request the Portland Bureau of Transportation (at the time known as the Portland Office of Transportation, and abbreviated as PDOT^{sic}) to undertake an independent analysis of the connectivity options considered earlier by the university and its development supporters. In May 2002, the city council accepted PDOT's process proposal and also accepted PATI as the project sponsor. PDOT's assessment led to the same conclusion OHSU had reached earlier: an aerial tram was the preferred approach. PDOT also recommended a second tram linking the Marquam Hill area with a nearby transit center on SW Barbur Boulevard. In July 2002, the city council accepted PDOT's recommendations and asked PDOT and PATI to proceed to the design phase, including a design competition. Both were also asked to work with residents of the affected neighborhoods to identify ways to mitigate the tram's impact and identify other desired neighborhood improvements which should accompany the project. One of the results of that process was the Gibbs Street Pedestrian Bridge, which was completed mid-2012.

The design competition started out by identifying four firms which would participate in the contest. The competition officially began in January 2003, with firms from New York City, Amsterdam, and Los Angeles/Zürich as finalists. The winner, Angélil / Graham / Pfenninger / Scholl of Los Angeles/Zürich, was announced on March 26, 2003. In November, PATI chose Doppelmayr CTEC to design, fabricate and install the tram. The first public review of the project's status was November 2003.

=== Construction and opening ===
Construction began in August 2005, with work on both platforms and the intermediate tower occurring through the summer of that year. The bulk of the construction occurred in 2006. Installation of the engines and other equipment occurred during the spring and early summer of 2006, which was followed by installation of the cables during the late summer and early fall.

On October 29, 2006, the tram's two cars arrived from Switzerland after a week-long delay. An inaugural run of the tram was conducted on November 9, 2006. Four tram construction workers were the first to test ride the tram while harnessed to the roof and suspending arm. Testing on the tram continued through November. The tram opened to OHSU employees on December 15, 2006. The tram opened to the public on January 27, 2007.

=== Incidents ===
On December 4, 2018, a metal roof panel from one of the aerial tramway cabins came free and fell to the ground. The 35-square-foot panel fell an estimated 130 feet, struck a pedestrian below and caused minor injuries. After the incident, the Portland Bureau of Transportation commissioned a review of the incident. The review, and subsequent report, concluded that high winds dislodged the panel and that the existing latch and tether system failed to stop the panel from falling. In an effort to prevent future incidents, the engineering company designed a new permanent anchorage and safety tether system for the roof panels. Installation of this system was due to be complete by end of summer 2019.

== Funding and cost overruns ==
The project suffered significant cost overruns during its construction. Final cost was nearly four times the initial estimate, a development that nearly led to the tram's cancellation mid-construction. Operating costs are nearly twice original projections. When the city approved the tram project, it was understood that OHSU would pay for most of it. While the taxpayer share has grown, OHSU paid for 85% of the total cost of the tram though it is operated as public transit facility.

=== Initial estimates and funding ===
The initial budget for the tram, published in November 2002, was $15.5 million, excluding "soft costs" such as project management and architect's fees. Funding sources for the $15.5 million include a direct $4 million cash contribution from OHSU, $9.5 from local improvement districts set up to fund tram construction, of which OHSU's share is $4.8 million, and $2 million from the city of Portland, via the Portland Development Commission. Other property owners in the South Waterfront Local Improvement District pay the remaining $3.7 million.

In April 2004, the second public review was held to present project recommendations prior to a May review by the city council. The costs by then were estimated to be $28.5 million, including soft costs. The city's share at that time was $3.5 million. In April 2005, the price was readjusted again to $40 million with a construction delay of six months. Higher steel costs, weakening US dollars, and engineering modifications were blamed. By October, The Oregonian reported that steel costs had led to bids pushing the project's price (with contingency funds) to $45 million. The increased cost was expected to be met through South Waterfront urban renewal contributions which would have otherwise been spent on streets and parks.

=== Review of the project ===
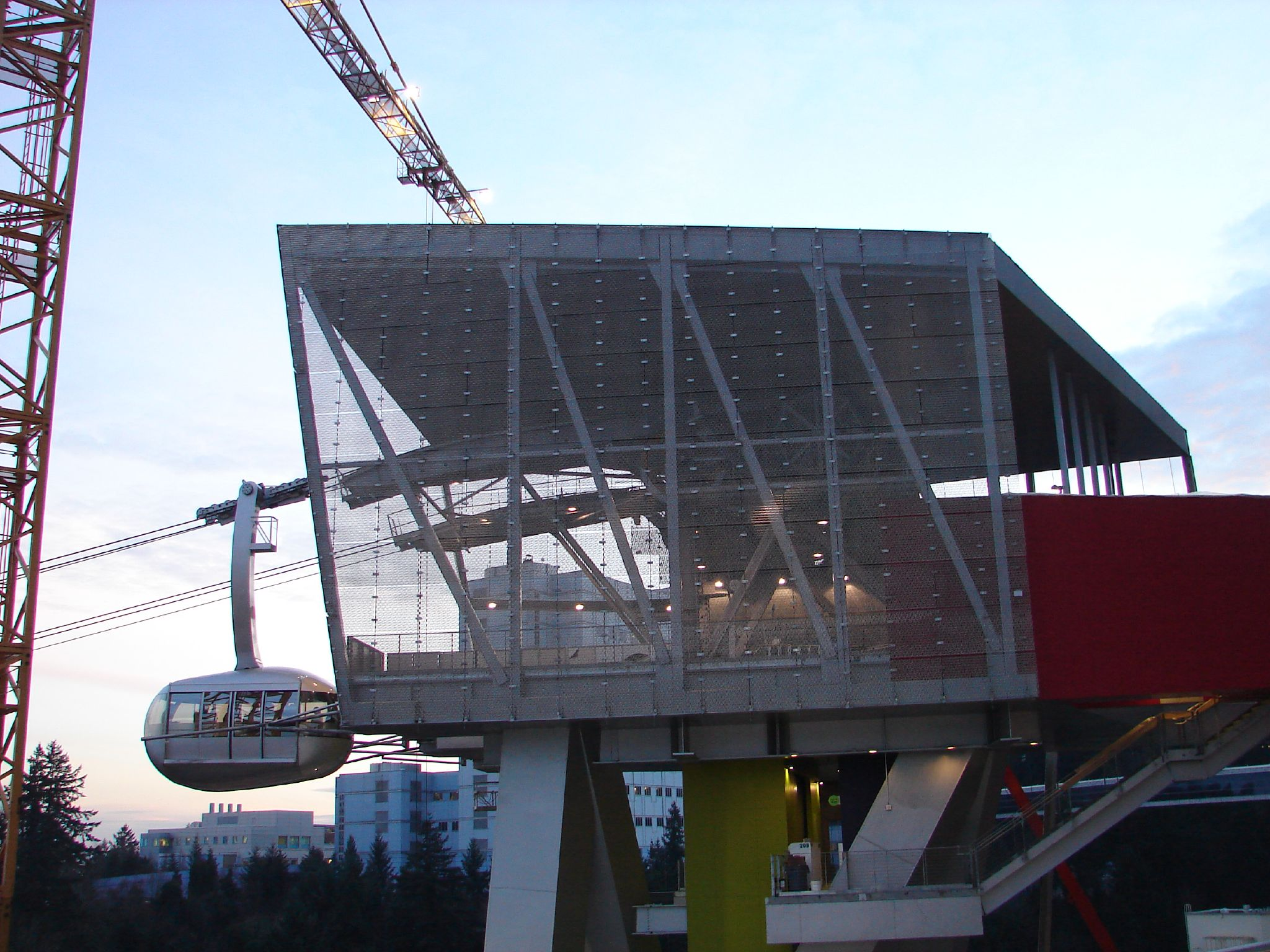
A tram car docking with the upper terminal

In January 2006, Portland city commissioner Sam Adams, who inherited the city's oversight of the project, undertook several actions in response to spiraling costs. The executive director of PATI was ousted, and a month-long independent audit and risk assessment was undertaken; its results were published February 1, 2006. By this point, construction was over one third completed.

The audit revealed that OHSU managers knew as early as 2003 that the tram would cost well in excess of the original $15.5 million figure, partially due to a change in location of the upper terminal to accommodate planned hospital construction, but had withheld that information from city leaders. This resulted in harsh public criticism of OHSU management, with city commissioner Randy Leonard accusing the university leadership of an "outrageous shell game...all at the expense of taxpayers". As a result, the city of Portland threatened to withdraw funding from the tram mid-construction, which would probably have scuttled the project. OHSU protested vigorously, threatening a lawsuit should the tram be canceled, and claimed the city was responsible for making up any budget shortfall. Negotiations between the city, OHSU, and the contractors ensued, with a revised funding plan and budget being agreed upon in April 2006, by a 3–2 vote of the city council. This revised funding plan required concessions from all parties involved, and called for a final budget of $57 million, with contributions from the city at $8.5 million, or nearly 15% of the overall budget. This final budget was met.

=== Operating costs ===
The tram's operating costs are also higher than expected. Originally, it was expected to cost $915,000 annually, but is now expected to be $1.7 million. As a result, the fare—originally estimated at $1.70—is set at $8.50 (as of 2025), similar to the price of an all-day ticket on Tri-Met ($5.00). The fare is waived for OHSU employees, students, patients, and visitors. Operating costs are divided between the city and OHSU in proportion to the ridership. (If 85% of passengers are OHSU-related, OHSU pays 85% of the operating cost.)

== Community response ==
Even prior to the cost increases which plagued the design and construction of the tram, the project has been subject to criticism from the public. Many residents in the neighborhoods under the tram's route object to the tram's presence. The cost increases themselves, and the perceived machinations of public officials, have been controversial.

=== Objections from underlying neighborhoods ===
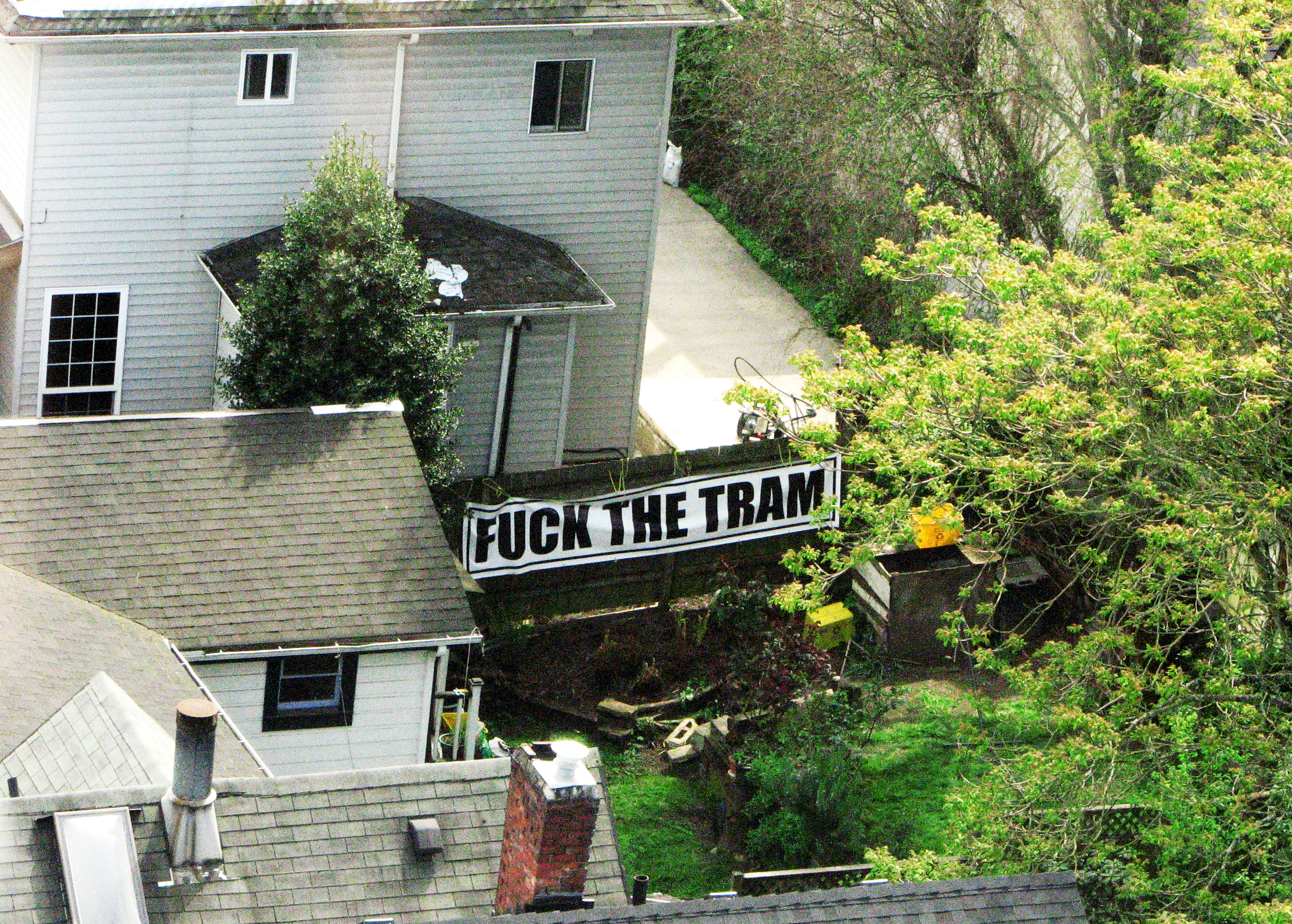
Auld's controversial protest banner, viewed from the tram itself.

Many residents of the Corbett-Terwilliger and Lair Hill neighborhoods, over which the tram passes, were concerned the cars would be an invasion of privacy and lead to lower property values. Initially, residents were promised that overhead power lines would be buried as part of the project, but as cost overruns mounted, this plan was scrapped. Neighborhood opponents of the tram have cited other reasons for opposing the tram's construction, including the fact that the North Corbett neighborhood is a historic district listed on the National Register of Historic Places. Some residents filed a lawsuit against the city and OHSU, claiming that they own the "airspace" above their properties. The city later offered to purchase homes directly under the tram route at fair market value.

In the initial years after its completion, the tram was unpopular with some living underneath its route. In April 2007, homeowner Justin Auld, living under the tram route, placed a sign on his backyard fence stating "FUCK THE TRAM" in large block letters. The sign is not visible from the street, only from the air. The publicity surrounding the sign prompted city officials to quietly negotiate with the homeowner, and the sign has since been moved and the expletive covered.

=== Concerns over the cost ===
Both OHSU and the city of Portland have taken much public criticism for ballooning development costs. Local television station KATU questioned the relative price of the Portland tram compared to a new tram at Jackson Hole Mountain Resort, which was built by the same company, and (as of 2007) was projected to carry 28 percent more passengers, but costing only $25 million.

The tram's supporters, however, claimed that many of the increases are justified, or due to circumstances beyond the developers' control. The auditor's report, commissioned in 2006, complimented the tram as "a dramatic, one-of-a-kind facility that will become a Portland landmark," and noted that the design was difficult to construct, requiring the tall, thin, complex tower and the tall, heavily loaded upper terminal to be built within very tight tolerances.

In addition, it has been claimed that the re-planning delayed the tram's completion. One of the designers of the tram noted that "if we added up all the times we went back to try to save money, we probably lost a year. Maybe we saved $2 million, but what did we lose? If we had an extra year, that would have meant a lot."

=== Concerns over corporate welfare ===
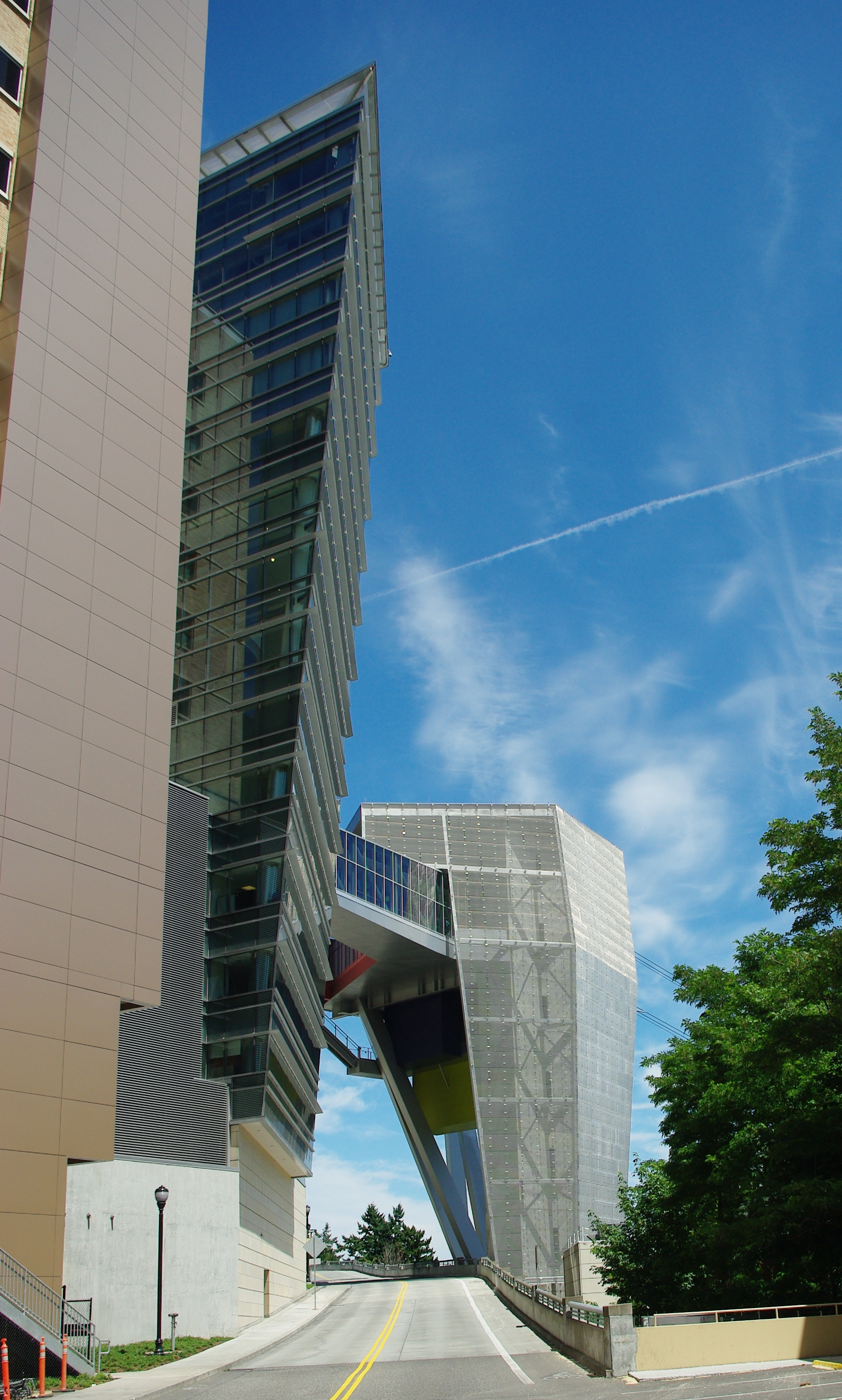
The upper station with OHSU Hospital on the left

Some critics, at the time of construction, cited the tram as an example of corporate welfare for OHSU with limited public benefit. A 2001 study done by OHSU prior to the tram's being designed projected that the tram would have 4,700 riders per day by 2030, with less than one fifth (850) of those being non-OHSU users. While the lower station has easy public access, access to the upper station requires navigating through the OHSU hospital. The Cascade Policy Institute, a local libertarian research group, criticized the project for being "railroaded through the political process by small groups of private interests", and expressed doubt that tram construction would lead to new jobs.

Others argue that while the issues of increasing public costs are real, the importance of continued growth of OHSU for the city's economy must be factored in as well. Not only is it the largest employer in the city, but OHSU is an important and effective vehicle to attract both federal funding, totaling more than $168 million for 2005, and a highly skilled workforce to the area. The growth in the current campus on the Marquam Hill is limited by access roads and parking, an expansion of which would likely cause more dramatic harm to the surrounding communities.

=== Architectural and visual impacts ===
The tram has been praised for its visual impact. Critic Jeff Jahn of PortlandArt.net called the tram "the most significant new piece of architecture to be added to Portland since Michael Graves' Portland Building in 1980". The tram has also won several architectural awards, including the American Institute of Architects' Los Angeles chapter's 2006 NEXT Honor Award, and the 2007 Presidential Award of Excellence from the American Institute of Steel Construction.

According to city commissioner Adams, a cheaper alternative which would have changed the tower's designs to a lattice style used in electrical transmission towers, was not considered because the result would look like an "ugly ski lift at a bad ski resort" and leave the city with what Adams called an "ugly postcard" that could last 100 years. Critics of the tram have also expressed concern over the tram's spoiling views for the homeowners from the city's West Hills, particularly from Gibbs Street, under the tram.

== See also ==
- Sandia Peak Tramway
