= South Waterfront, Portland, Oregon =

District in Portland, Oregon, U.S.

South Waterfront
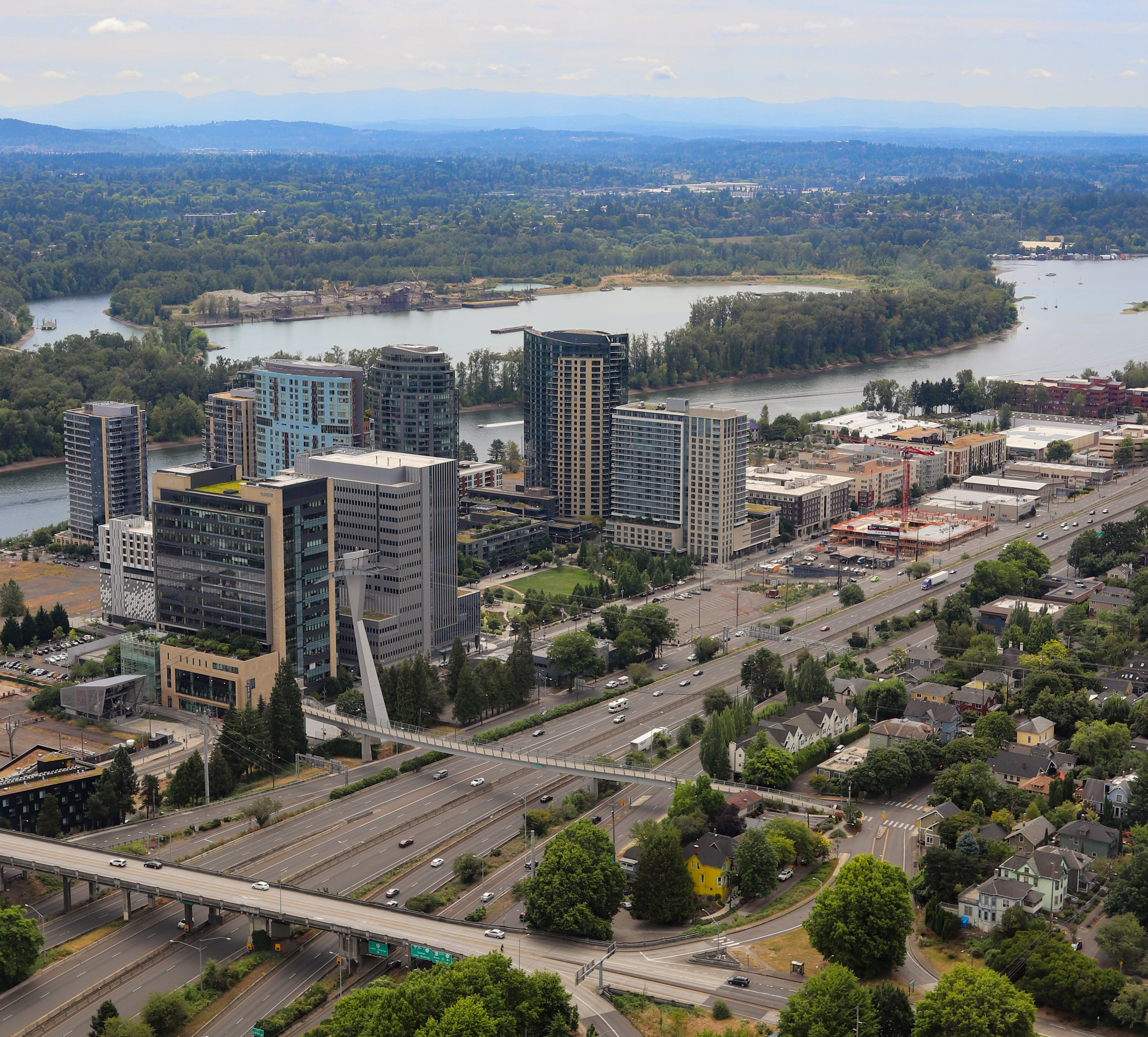
- The South Waterfront in August 2020
- Interactive map of South Waterfront

General information
- Location: Portland, Oregon
- Coordinates: 45.497°N 122.67°W

Construction
- Constructed: 2004

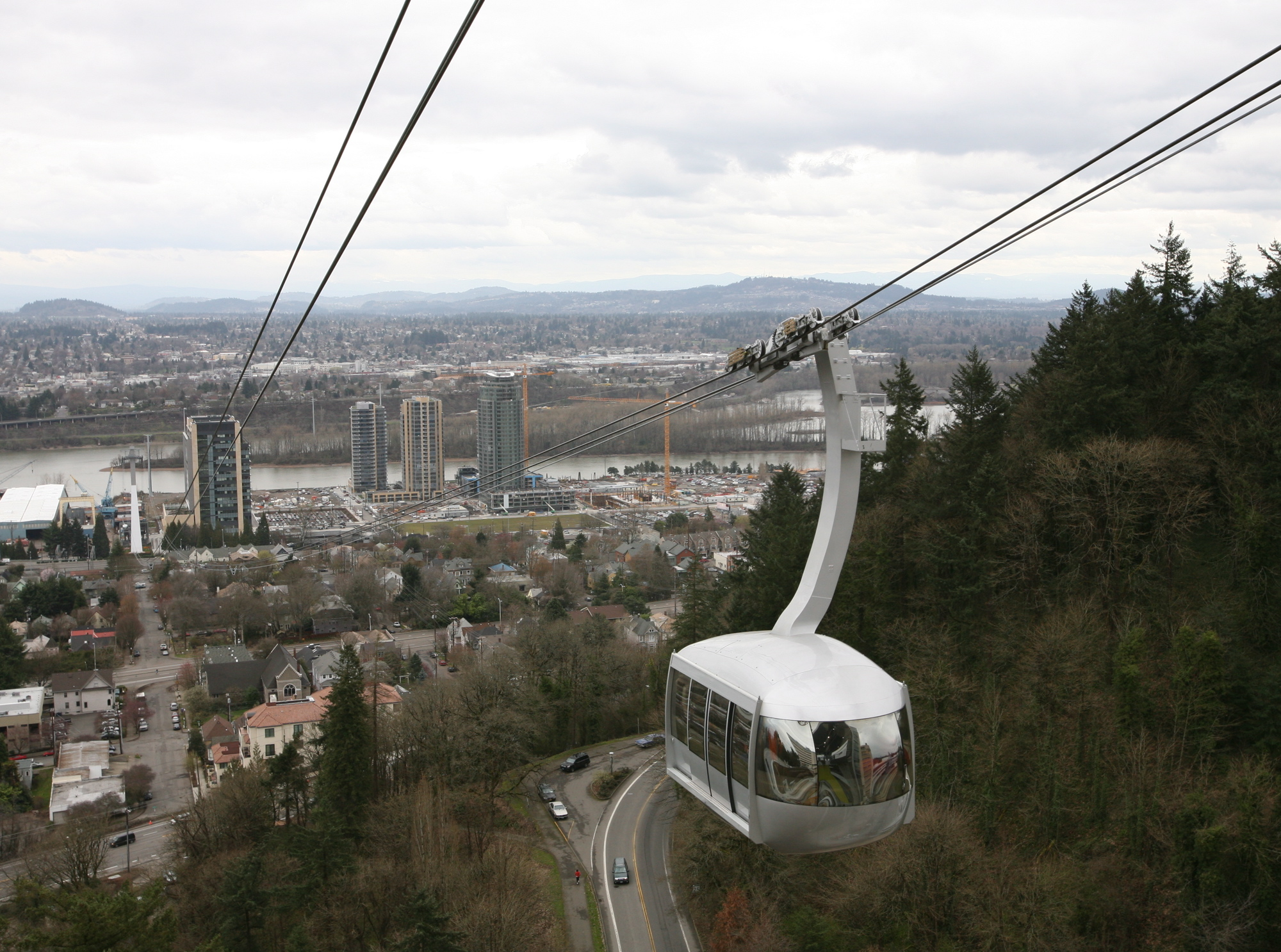
Portland Aerial Tram car descends towards the rising South Waterfront district in Portland, Oregon

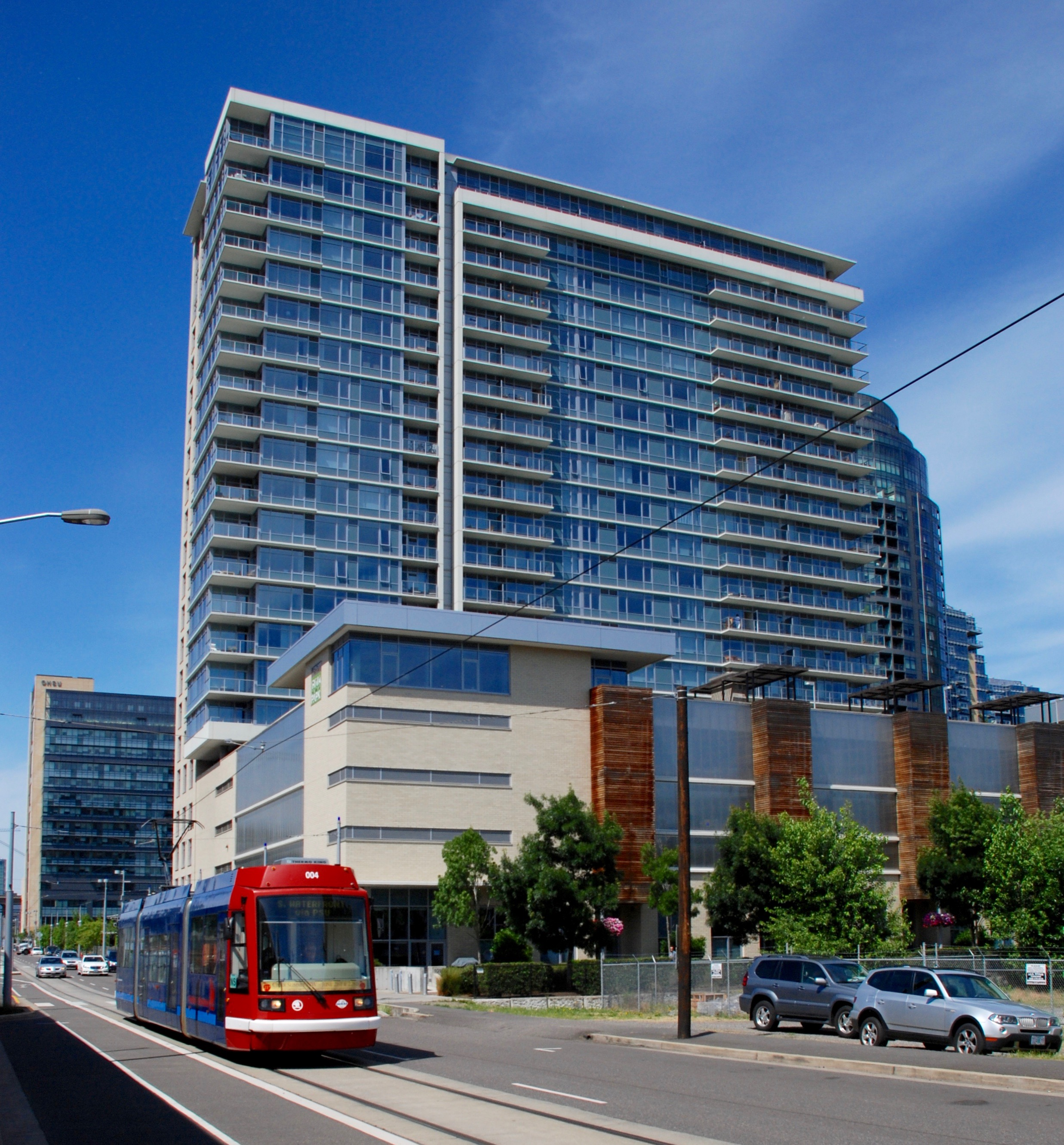
Public transit in the district includes the Portland Streetcar, seen here passing Riva on the Park.

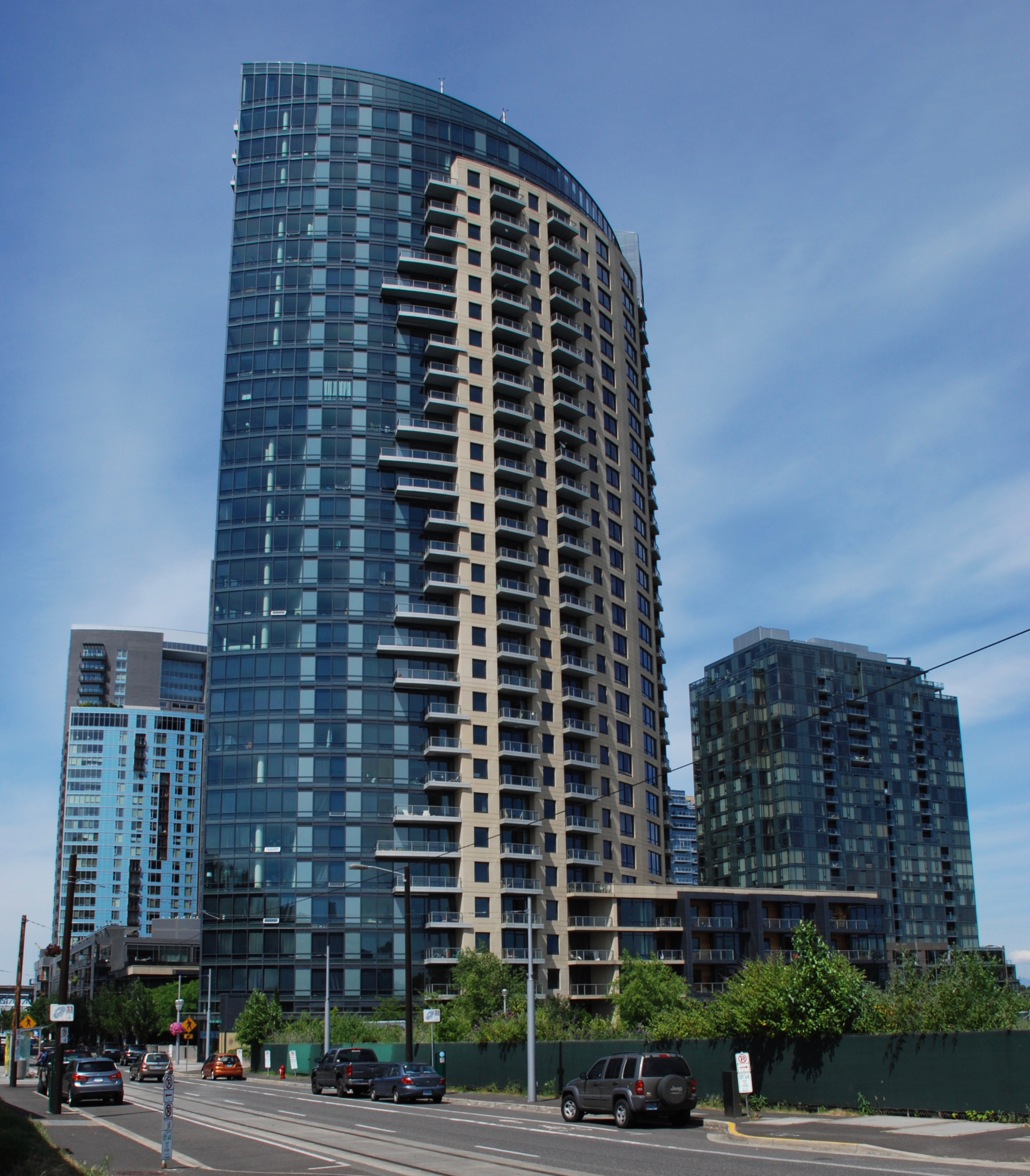
The Ardea and (at right) Atwater Place in 2016. In the background at left is the Mirabella Portland tower.

The South Waterfront is a high-rise district under construction on former brownfield industrial land in the South Portland neighborhood south of downtown Portland, Oregon, U.S. It is one of the largest urban redevelopment projects in the United States. It is connected to downtown Portland by the Portland Streetcar and MAX Orange Line (at South Waterfront/SW Moody Station), and to the Oregon Health & Science University (OHSU) main campus atop Marquam Hill by the Portland Aerial Tram, as well as roads to Interstate 5 and Oregon Route 43.

== Description and history ==
The South Waterfront is part of the Portland Development Commission's North Macadam Urban Renewal District. The first phase of the South Waterfront is the $1.9 billion "River Blocks" development. Construction began in early 2004. The full build-out of the district envisions many residential (primarily condominiums) and medical research towers ranging in height from 6 stories to 35+ stories.

As of August 2010, nine towers have been completed in the district: the 16-story OHSU Center for Health & Healing, the twin condominium towers known as the Meriwether, at 21 and 24 stories, the 31-story John Ross Tower condominium, the 22-story Atwater Place condominium tower, the 31-story apartments The Ardea, the 22-story Riva on the Park, the 30-story Mirabella Portland, the Matisse, and Gray's Landing. The Mirabella is the district's first senior living community.

A linear park called South Waterfront Greenway, running along the west bank of the Willamette River, is partially completed. The district currently has its own park between the Riva on the Park and OHSU. The Gibbs Street Pedestrian Bridge, which opened in July 2012, connects the South Waterfront District with Lair Hill over I-5.

The Tilikum Crossing, Bridge of the People, a new TriMet bridge for the MAX Orange Line that carries only pedestrians, bicyclists and public transit vehicles between the South Waterfront and Hosford-Abernethy, opened on September 12, 2015.

In addition to residences, the district contains restaurants, grocery, retail, and service businesses, with more in the planning stages.

Construction of three new OHSU buildings in the district is scheduled to begin in 2016, and the university has earmarked $500 million for the work, which is expected to take about two years. Together with the existing OHSU Center for Health & Healing, the new facilities will be part of the Knight Cancer Institute, which also has facilities outside the South Waterfront. The largest of the buildings will be for patient medical care, another will be for research and administration, and the third will provide housing for patients and their families.

== See also ==
- Zidell Yards
