= Gibbs Street Pedestrian Bridge =

Pedestrian bridge in Portland, Oregon, U.S.

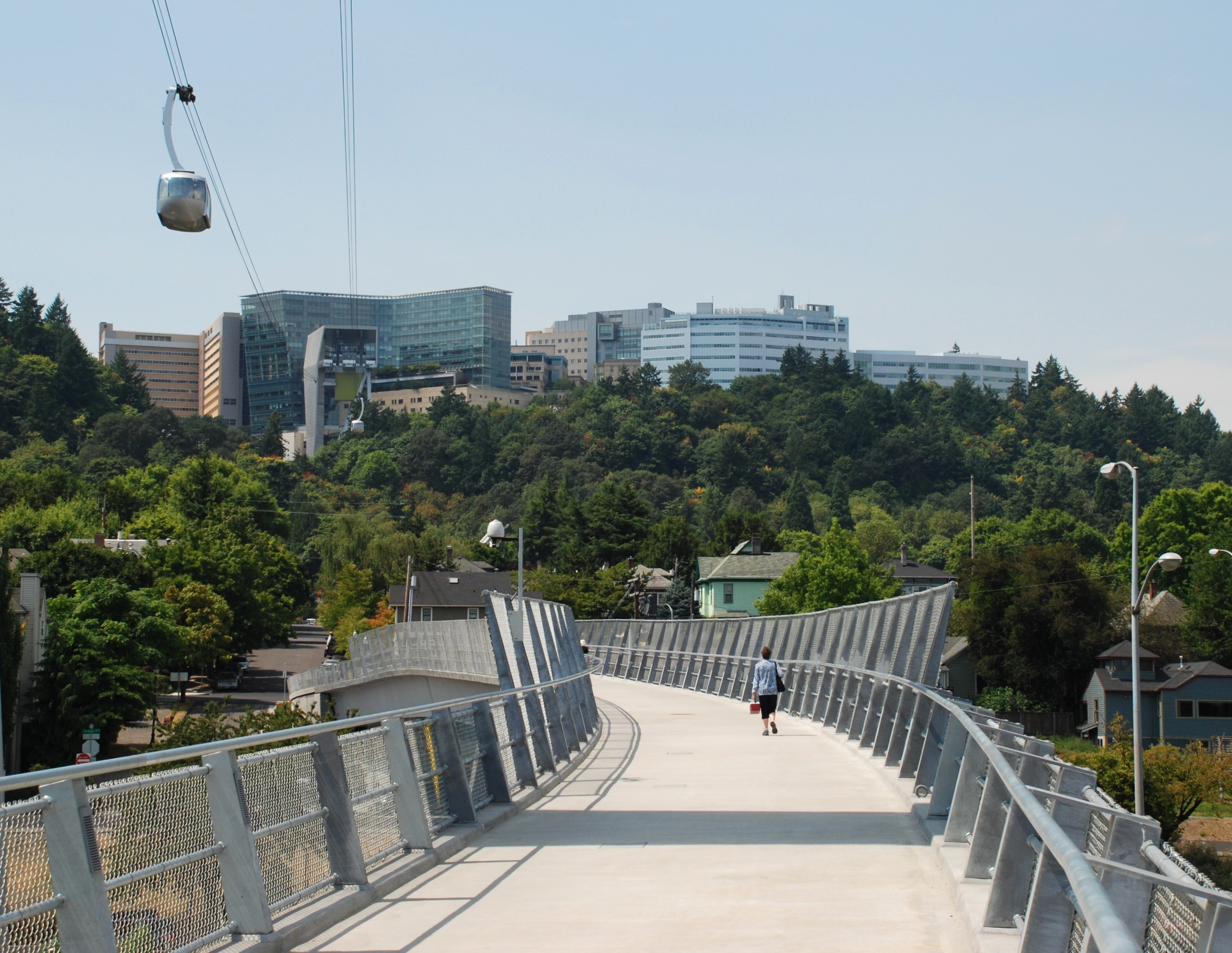
- Looking west on the bridge, toward Marquam Hill and Oregon Health & Science University, with the Portland Aerial Tram passing overhead
- Coordinates: 45.4993°N 122.673°W
- Crosses: Interstate 5 and SW Macadam Avenue
- Locale: Portland, Oregon
- Official name: US Congresswoman Darlene Hooley Pedestrian Bridge at Gibbs Street
- Named for: Darlene Hooley

Characteristics
- Design: box girder
- Material: Steel
- Total length: 700 feet (210 m)

History
- Construction start: January 2011
- Construction end: June 2012
- Opened: July 14, 2012

Location
- Interactive map of Gibbs Street Pedestrian Bridge

The Gibbs Street Pedestrian Bridge, formally known as the US Congresswoman Darlene Hooley Pedestrian Bridge at Gibbs Street, is an approximately 700-foot (210 m) pedestrian bridge in Portland, Oregon, United States. Opened on July 14, 2012, it connects the Lair Hill neighborhood with the South Waterfront area. It is a steel box girder bridge, a change from the original plans for an extradosed bridge, made to reduce the project's cost.

The bridge crosses I-5 and SW Macadam Avenue, and connects SW Kelly Avenue on the west side to SW Moody Avenue on the east side. At the Moody Avenue end there is a stop on the Portland Streetcar's NS Line, and the Portland Aerial Tram's lower terminus is located across the street. Construction began in January 2011 and was completed in June 2012.

== Background ==
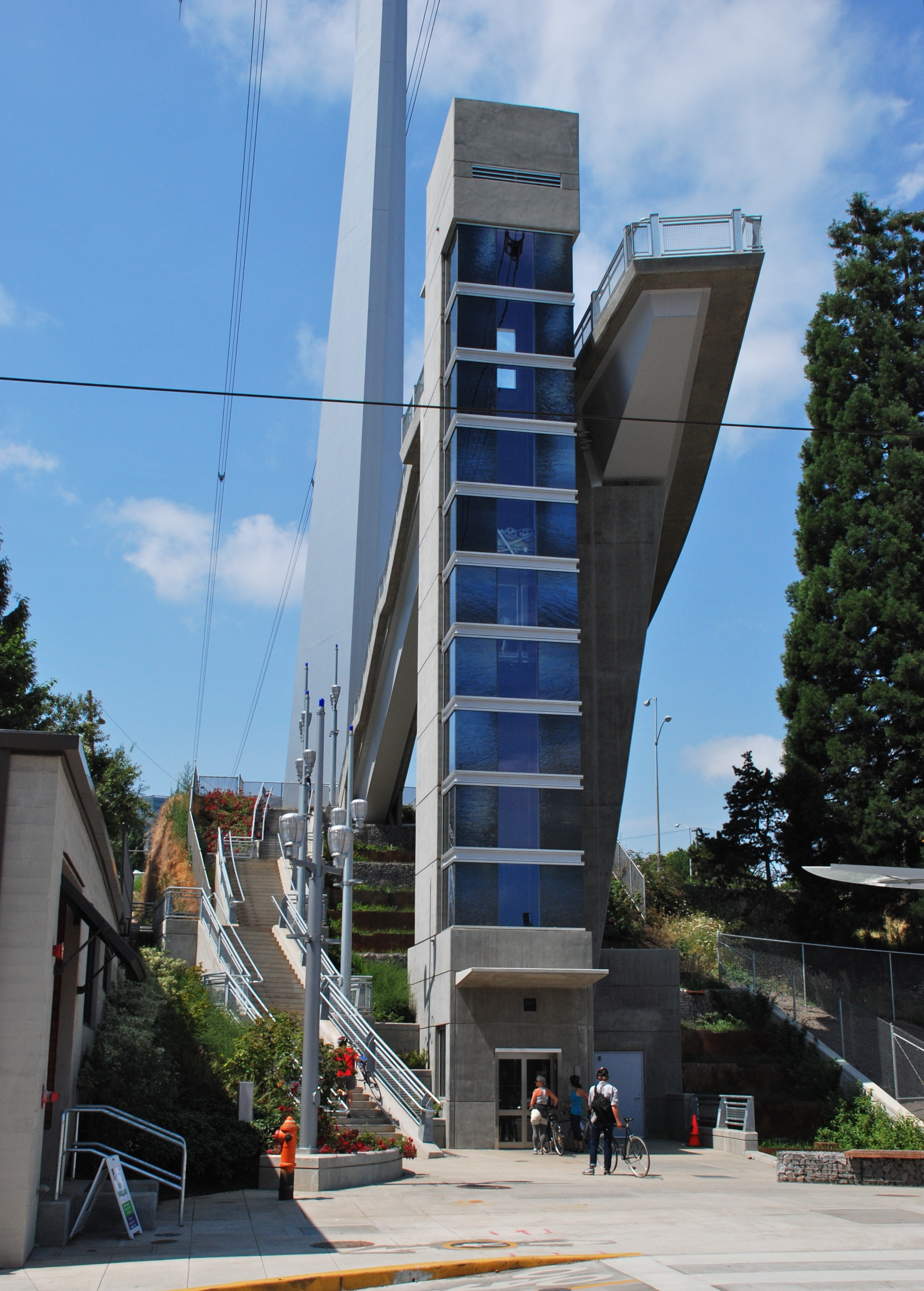
The elevator tower and stairway at the bridge's east end, at Moody Avenue

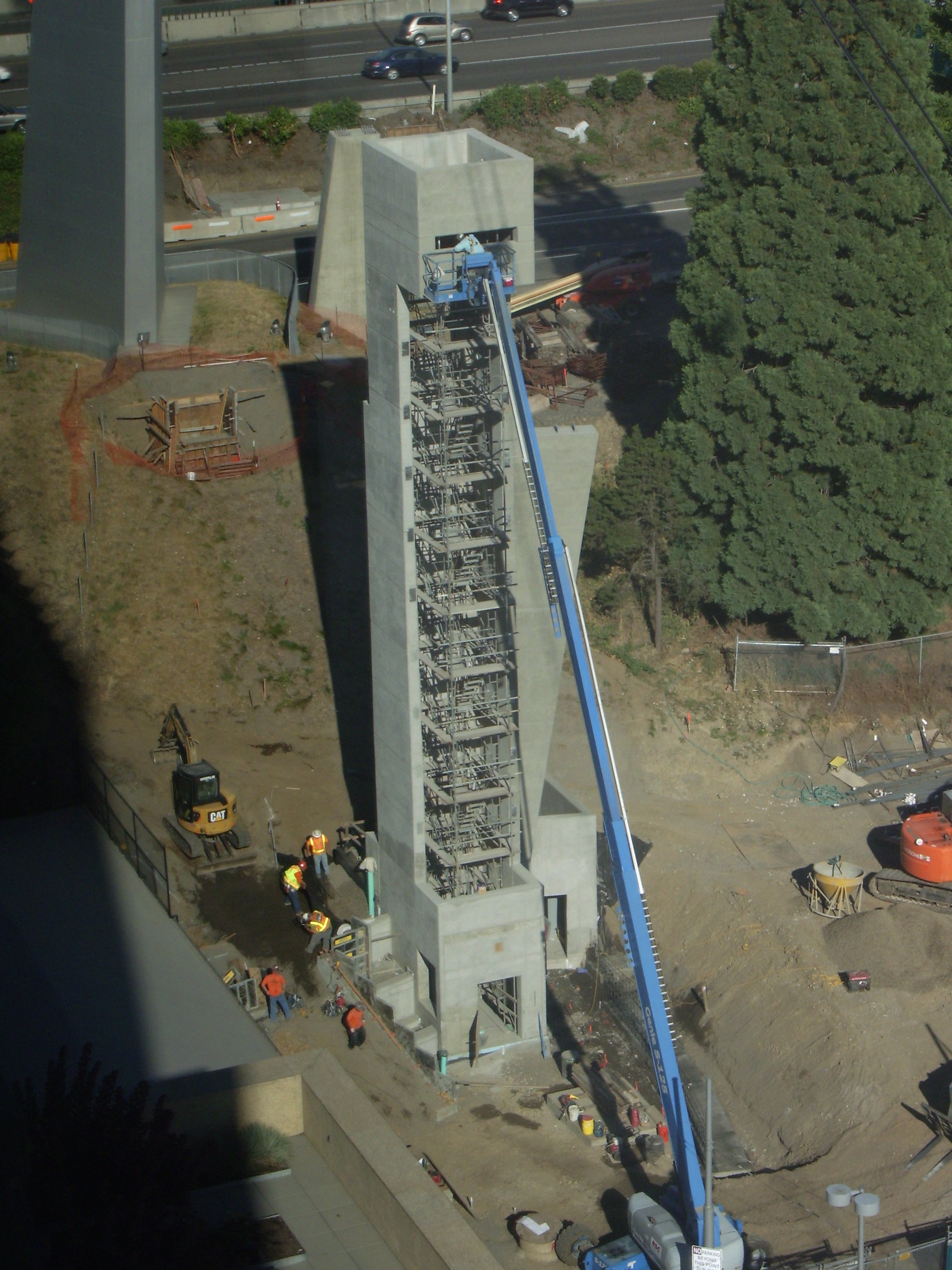
The east terminus under construction summer 2011

The project dates back to 2005 with approval of the federal Transportation Equity Act of 2005 which dedicated $5 million to the project.

The preliminary design was approved by the Portland City Council on December 3, 2008. It was originally to be an extradosed-type bridge. In the first round of bidding, the project exceeded the allotted budget, and consequently needed to be rescaled. This in turn delayed the timeline and led to a simpler design. After undergoing technical engineering design and detailed neighborhood impact assessment, the refined project was opened to bidding in autumn 2010, and the city council awarded a $6.7 million construction contract to Wildish Standard Paving Company of Eugene.

The overall budget, originally anticipated to be between $7 million and $11.3 million, is expected to be met mostly by federal funds, with ten percent local funding. Early public opinion was mixed, but turned favorable as the plan progressed, particularly by those living nearby. One of the provisions of the 2002–2006 tram construction was to bury existing powerlines in the underlying neighborhoods, but those plans were dropped when the highly controversial tram project encountered significant budget overruns. The pedestrian bridge was another mitigating concession promised.

The $11.3 million congressional allotment may have been to also pay for a study to improve access to the Ross Island Bridge. Eastbound traffic for the bridge frequently clogs the Lair Hill neighborhood while waiting to merge. Mayor Sam Adams has said that whatever funds are left over from the Gibbs Bridge project can be used for studying the Ross Island auto-access problem.

The bridge was dedicated on July 14, 2012, and given the formal name US Congresswoman Darlene Hooley Pedestrian Bridge at Gibbs Street in honor of retired representative Darlene Hooley.

== Description, usage ==
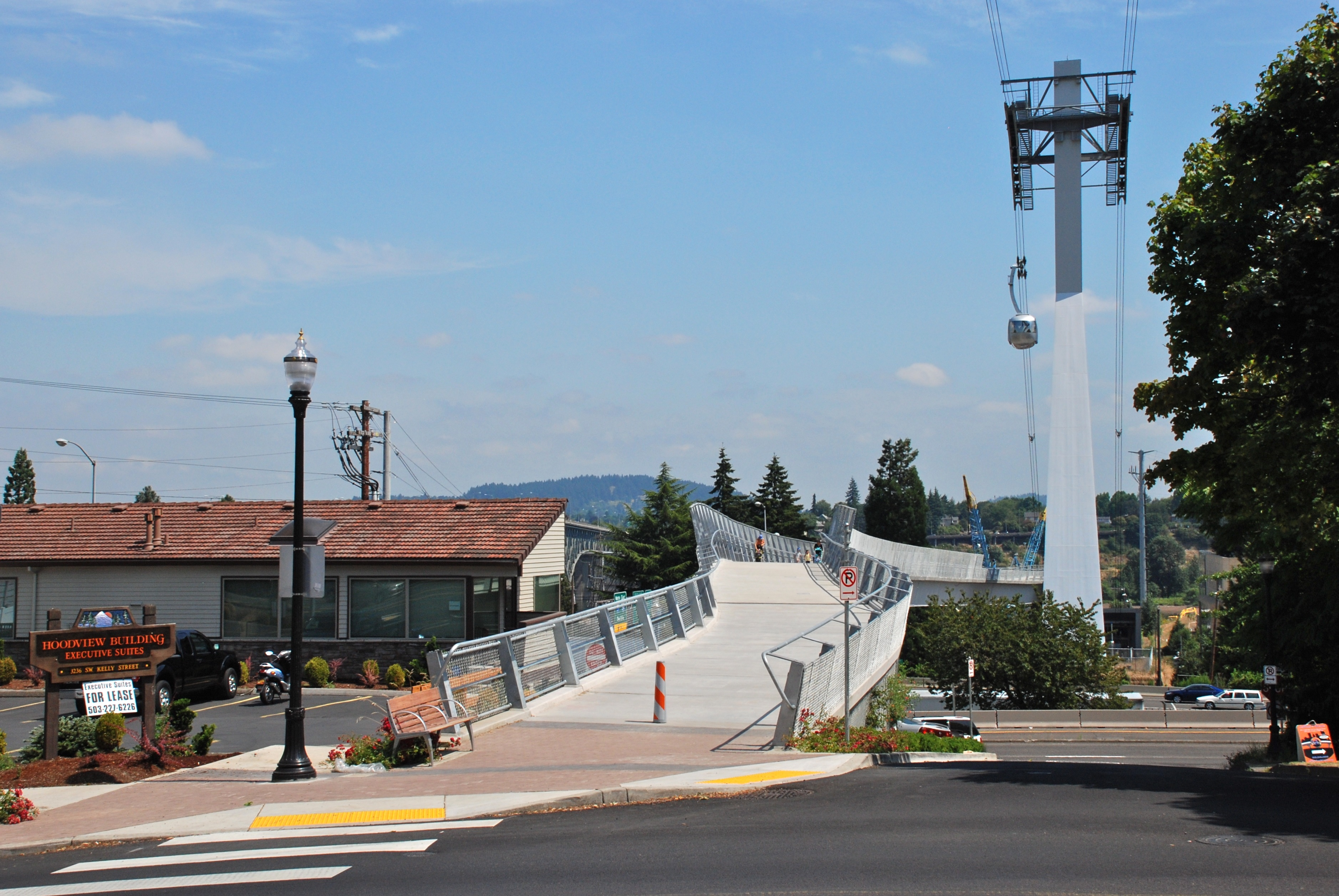
The west terminus, at Gibbs Street and Kelly Avenue, looking east

To compensate for the 70-foot (21 m) elevation difference at the ends of the bridge, an elevator and a bicycle stairway was built at the South Waterfront end to serve the five-story height. It includes a 132-step stairway with rest areas.

Estimates of existing demand indicate that if the bridge opened in 2009, summertime usage would total 466 crossings per day, composed half of bicycle use and half pedestrian use. With school in session, fall usage is expected to increase to 730 crossings per day: 310 by bicycle and 420 pedestrians. By 2035, usage is estimated at 3,000 to 4,000 crossings per day.

The Portland Bureau of Transportation took counts at the bridge in September 2014. Over a two-hour period on a weekday afternoon, 543 pedestrians and cyclists used the bridge.

== See also ==
- Tilikum Crossing: a transit and pedestrian bridge over the Willamette River and located 600 meters (0.37 mi) north of Gibbs Street
