= Shriners Hospitals for Children =

Network of hospitals for children

- Nickname: Shriners Children's
- Established: September 16, 1922
- Type: Nonprofit organization
- Legal status: 501(c)(3) organization
- Purpose: Children's hospitals
- Headquarters: Tampa, Florida
- Region served: North America
- Owner: Shriners International
- Website: www.shrinerschildrens.org

Shriners Hospitals for Children, commonly known as Shriners Children's and originally Shriners Hospitals for Crippled Children until 1996, is a network of non-profit children's hospitals and other pediatric medical facilities across North America. Children with orthopaedic conditions, burns, spinal cord injuries, and cleft lip and palate are eligible for care and receive all services in a family-centered environment, regardless of the patients' ability to pay. Care for children is usually provided until age 18, although in some cases, it may be extended to age 21.

Headquartered in Tampa, Florida, the hospitals are owned and operated by Shriners International, formally known as the Ancient Arabic Order of the Nobles of the Mystic Shrine, a Freemasonry-related organization whose members are known as Shriners. Patients are not required to have any familial affiliation with the Shriners order or Freemasonry. The hospitals' advertising campaign features the tagline "Love to the Rescue."

== History ==
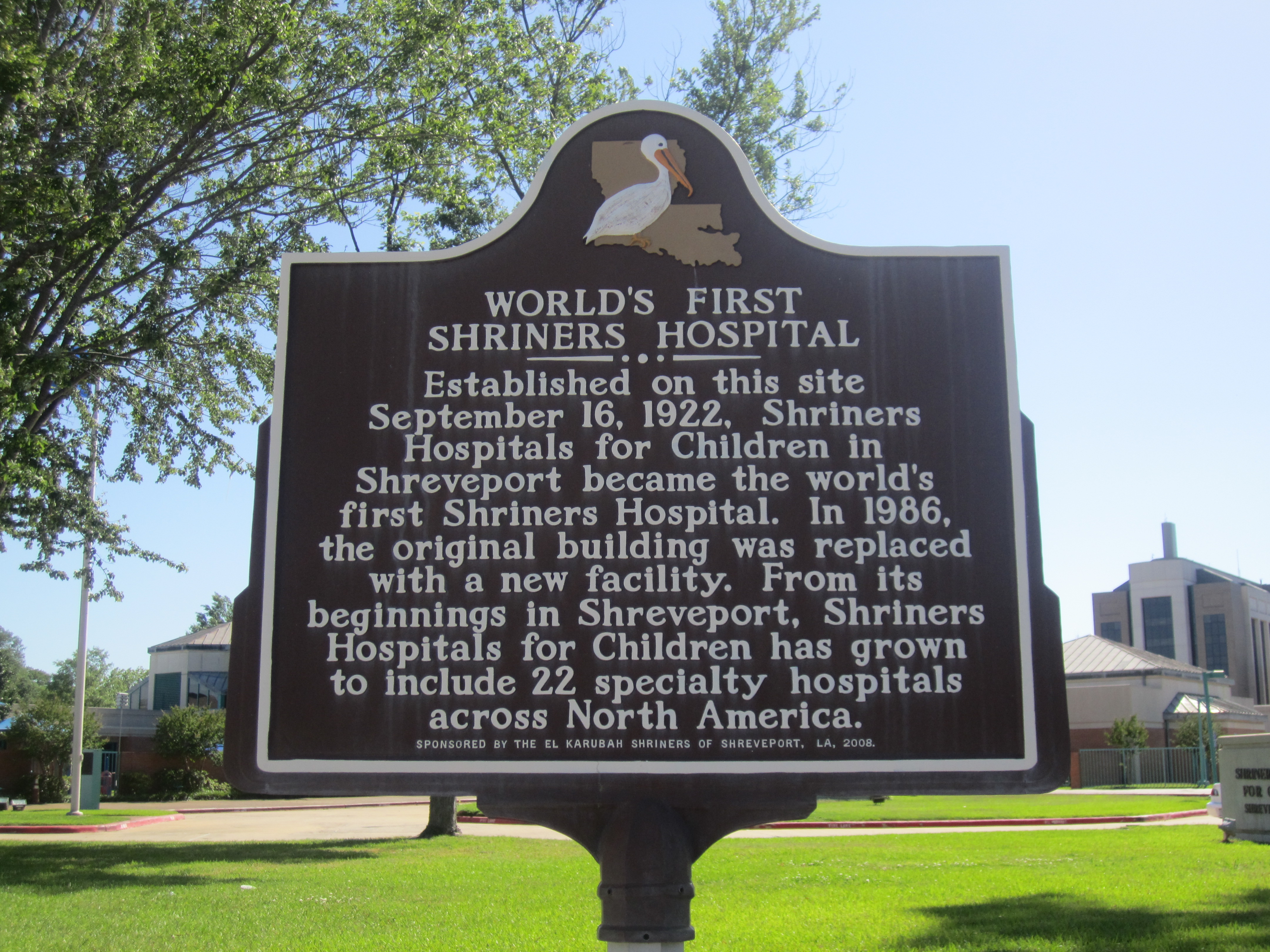
Historical marker noting location of first Shriners Hospital (1922) off King's Highway in Shreveport, Louisiana

In 1920, the Imperial Session of the Shriners was held in Portland, Oregon. During that session the membership unanimously passed a resolution put forward by W. Freeland Kendrick who, while serving as Imperial Potentate, put forth the resolution that created what was originally known as the Shriners Hospitals for Crippled Children. The first hospital in the system opened on September 16, 1922, in Shreveport, Louisiana. It provided pediatric orthopaedic care.

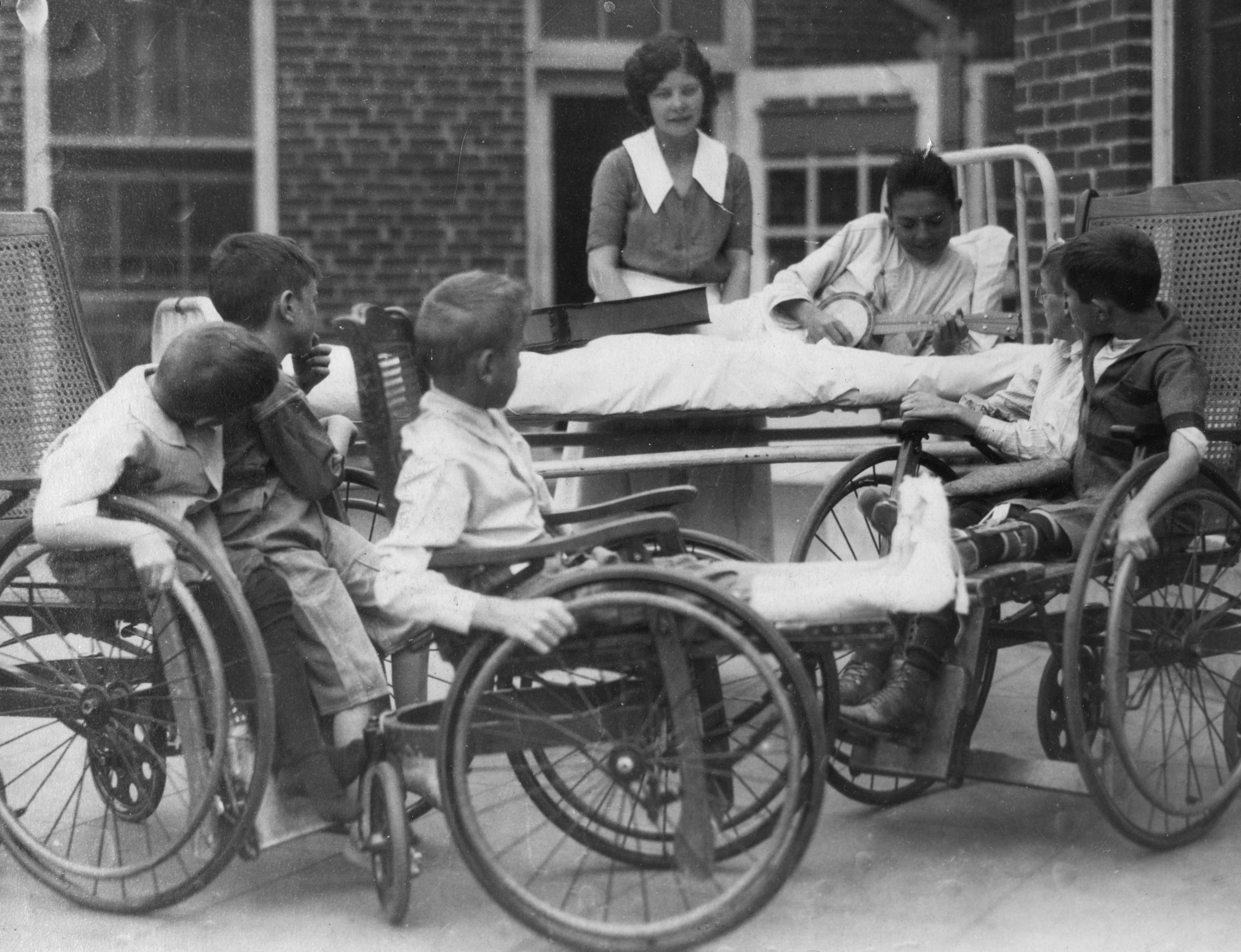
Children at the Twin Cities Shriners Hospital in 1923. Opened in March, 1923, it was the system's third location.

Shriners Hospitals for Children worked closely with the United States Southern Command and other military commands, including the Army and Air Force, the Guatemalan combined military force, and via the U.S. embassy, the U.S. Department of Health & Human Services and the U.S. State Department to arrange medical visas and transportation to the United States "with a global commitment to children around the world."

In 1962, the Shriners of North America allocated $10 million to establish three hospitals that specialized in the treatment and rehabilitation of burned children. After visiting 21 university-based medical institutions, the decision was made to build their first pediatric burn hospital on the campus of the University of Texas Medical Branch in Galveston, Texas.

In 1994, the Chronicle of Philanthropy, an industry publication, released the results of the largest study of charitable and non-profit organization popularity and credibility. The study showed that the Shriners Hospitals were ranked as the 9th "most popular charity/non-profit in America" of over 100 charities researched with 40% of Americans over the age of 12 choosing "Love" and "Like A Lot" for the Shriners Hospitals. In July 1996, during its annual convention in New Orleans, the Shriners of North America voted to rename the hospital system to Shriners Hospitals for Children, dropping “crippled” from the name to reflect the modern mission of the system and due to the word’s now-archaic and offensive connotation to individuals with physical disabilities.

In September 2008, the Shriner's Hospital in Galveston sustained significant damage from Hurricane Ike. The hospital was closed for renovation at that time, and care for children with acute burns was provided at other Shriners Hospitals for Children. The Shriners had considered closing facilities in Shreveport, Louisiana; Greenville, South Carolina; Erie, Pennsylvania; Spokane, Washington; Springfield, Massachusetts; and Galveston, Texas, eliminating a total of 225 beds. However, in July 2009, the Shriners National Convention voted overwhelmingly against closing any hospitals and to repair and reopen the Galveston facility.

In 2009, despite an endowment that declined from $8 billion to $5 billion in less than a year because of the poor economy, Douglas Maxwell, the hospitals' CEO, said he and other Shriners are confident the hospital system will be able to remain solvent in the long term. Maxwell stated in July 2009 that some of the facilities may become outpatient surgical centers and will begin accepting insurance payments (for most care) for the first time in the hospitals' 87-year history. Maxwell said children with burns, orthopaedic conditions, spinal cord injuries, and cleft palates will continue to be treated without charge to their families.

In May 2015, Shriners Hospitals for Children became a member of the Mayo Clinic Care Network, a national network of organizations committed to better serving patients and their families through physician collaboration.

In the 2020s, Shriners Hospitals for Children rebranded as Shriners Children's, adapting to current nationwide trends in health care, especially the emphasis on outpatient care, and some locations becoming clinics or outpatient centers.

In 2023, Shriners Hospitals for Children has assets of just over $10 billion.

== Treatments ==
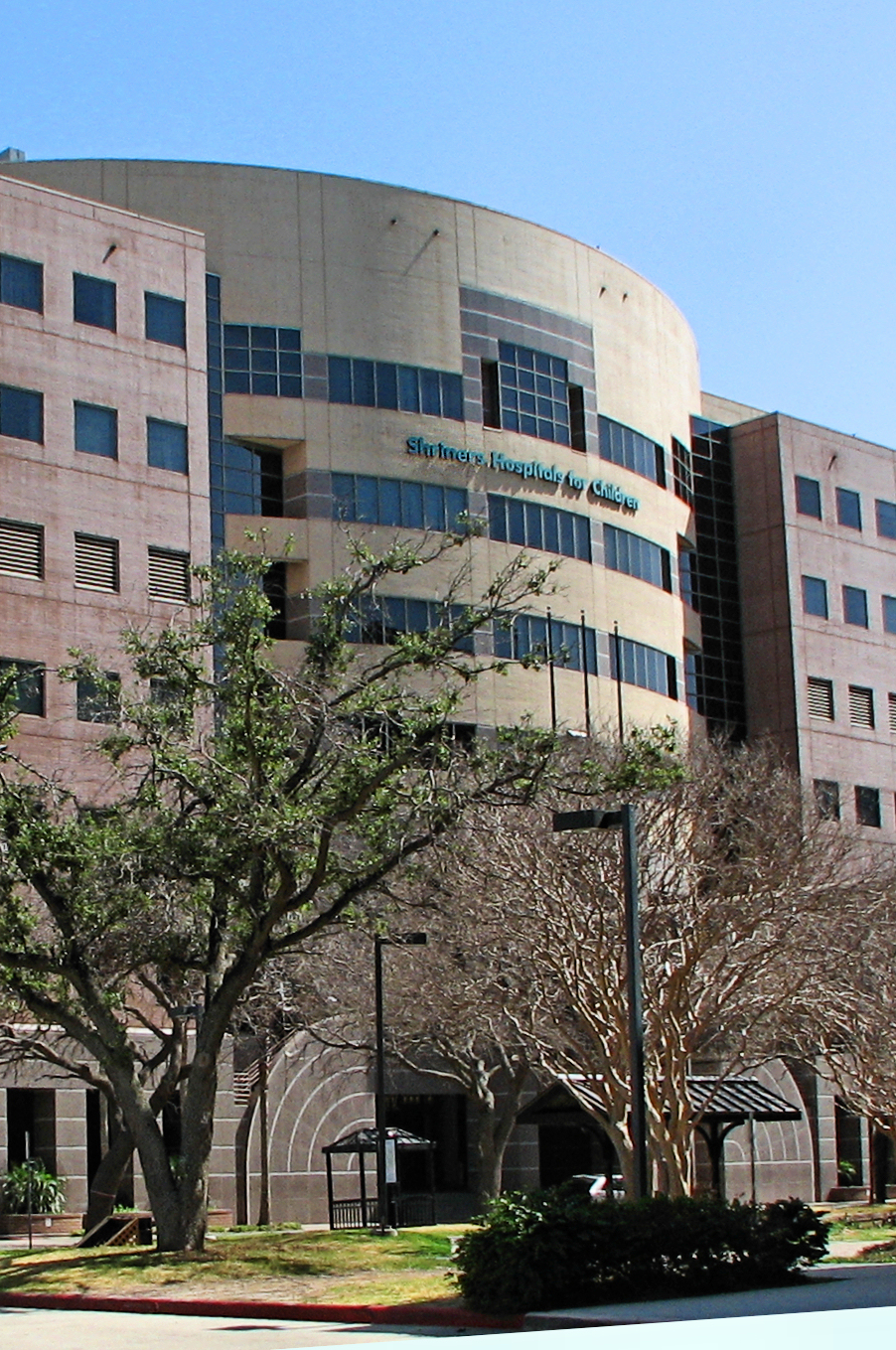
Shriners Children's Texas burn center on the campus of the University of Texas Medical Branch in Galveston, Texas

Treatment areas cover a wide range of pediatric orthopaedics, including scoliosis, limb discrepancies, clubfoot, hip dysplasia, and juvenile idiopathic arthritis, as well as cerebral palsy, spina bifida (myelomeningocele), and other neurological conditions that affect ambulation and movement. Three of the hospitals provide spinal cord injury rehabilitation that is developmentally appropriate for children and adolescents, with adventure and adapted sports programs, activity-based rehabilitation, aquatherapy, animal-assisted therapy, and other programs. Four of the hospitals (Boston, Galveston, Cincinnati, and Sacramento) provide care for children with burns, as well as treating a variety of skin conditions such as epidermolysis bullosa and toxic epidermal necrolysis. The Boston, Chicago, Shreveport, Galveston, Springfield, and Portland hospitals also provide treatment for children with craniofacial conditions, especially facial clefts.

The hospital in Sacramento is the only hospital in the Shriners' system that focuses on all three areas of treatment (burns, orthopaedics, and spinal cord injuries), as well as research. The Sacramento hospital also houses its own orthotics and prosthetics lab and development facilities. Transportation to the hospitals is often provided free of charge for patients and their family by Shriner-drivers (also known as Hospital Tripsters) across the country by van or by airplane. Children accepted for treatment become part of the Shriners Hospital system until their 18th or, sometimes, their 21st, birthday and are eligible for both inpatient and outpatient treatment for all facets of their disability.

== Research and education ==
While the main emphasis of the hospitals is to provide medical care to children regardless of the family's ability to pay, the mission of the hospitals also includes research on the conditions treated and the education of medical professionals, including medical residents and fellows; nurses; physical, recreation, and occupational therapists; speech and language pathologists; psychologists; social workers; and child life specialists.

== Facilities ==
=== United States ===
Shriners Hospitals locations by specialty:

- Shriners Children's Boston – Boston, Massachusetts – acute burns, orthopaedics, cleft lip and palate
- Shriners Children's Chicago – Chicago, Illinois – orthopaedics, spinal cord injury, cleft lip and palate
- Shriners Children's Erie – Erie, Pennsylvania – orthopaedics, spinal cord injury, sports medicine, pediatric rehabilitation and therapy
- Shriners Children's Greenville – Greenville, South Carolina – orthopaedics, pediatric rehabilitation and therapy, sports medicine, care management
- Shriners Children's Hawaii – Honolulu, Hawaii – orthopaedics, pediatric dentistry
- Shriners Children's Lexington – Lexington, Kentucky – orthopaedics
- Shriners Children's New England – Springfield, Massachusetts – orthopaedics, cleft lip and palate
- Shriners Children's Northern California – Sacramento, California – acute burns, orthopaedics, spinal cord injury – successor facility to the former San Francisco hospital
- Shriners Children's Ohio – Dayton, Ohio – acute burns, cleft lip and palate, pediatric plastic surgery – consolidated with the former Cincinnati hospital
- Shriners Children's Philadelphia – Philadelphia, Pennsylvania – orthopaedics, spinal cord injury, sports medicine, pediatric surgery
- Shriners Children's Portland – Portland, Oregon – orthopaedics, scoliosis, cleft lip and palate, burns - A predecessor building from 1923, the Old Shriners Children's Hospital also called "Shriners Hospital for Crippled Children", was listed on the U.S. National Register of Historic Places but has since been demolished.
- Shriners Children's Salt Lake City – Salt Lake City, Utah – orthopaedics
- Shriners Children's Shreveport – Shreveport, Louisiana – orthopaedics, scoliosis, cleft lip and palate – the first Shriners Hospital
- Shriners Children's Southern California – Pasadena, California – orthopaedics, cleft lip and palate
- Shriners Children's Spokane – Spokane, Washington – orthopaedics
- Shriners Children's St. Louis – St. Louis, Missouri – orthopaedics
- Shriners Children's Texas – Galveston, Texas – burn care, orthopaedics, spine and spinal cord, sports medicine – consolidated with the former Houston hospital
- Shriners Children's Twin Cities – Woodbury, Minnesota – orthopaedics, pediatric surgery, craniofacial, rheumatic diseases – successor facility to the former Minneapolis hospital

Satellite Clinics:

- Shriners Children's Bismarck Satellite Clinic – Bismarck, North Dakota – orthopaedics, club foot, sports medicine, cerebral palsy
- Shriners Children's Boys Town Satellite Clinic – Boys Town, Nebraska – orthopaedics, club foot, sports medicine, cerebral palsy
- Shriners Children's Downtown Los Angeles Satellite Clinic – Los Angeles, California
- Shriners Children's Doylestown Satellite Clinic – Doylestown, Pennsylvania – orthopaedics, spinal cord injury, sports medicine, radiology and imaging
- Shriners Children's Rapid City Satellite Clinic – Rapid City, South Dakota – orthopaedics, club foot, sports medicine, cerebral palsy

=== Canada ===
- Shriners Hospital for Children - Canada – Montreal, Quebec – (orthopaedics) - serving Canada and the northeast United States

=== Mexico ===
- Shriners Hospital for Children – Mexico City, Mexico – (orthopaedics)
- Shriners Children’s Guadalajara — Guadalajara, Mexico — (orthopaedics and burn patients)

== See also ==
- Shriners, the fraternity that founded Shriners Hospitals.
- Shriners Children's 500, a NASCAR Cup Series race held at Phoenix Raceway in Avondale, Arizona.
- Kosair Charities
- Old Scottish Rite Hospital
- Royal Masonic Hospital
- Masonic Children's Hospital
