= South Waterfront Greenway =

Public park and urban walkway in Portland, Oregon, U.S.

- Location within Portland, Oregon
- Location: Portland, Oregon, United States
- Coordinates: 45.4975°N 122.6679°W
- Created: 2015

The South Waterfront Greenway is a linear park and urban walkway along the Willamette River in the South Waterfront district of Portland, Oregon, in the United States.

== Description and history ==
The greenway will stretch from the Marquam Bridge south to the River Forum Building. Annual operations and maintenance for the park are expected to cost $489,000. The central segment, first of three to be completed, was opened on May 14, 2015. This section is 1,250 feet (380 m) long, cost $15.5 million, and includes 1,050 feet (320 m) of riverbank restoration.
