= Old Scottish Rite Hospital building =

Founded as the Scottish Rite Convalescent Home for Crippled Children, the Old Scottish Rite Hospital served indigent children, either crippled, or recovering from surgery at Piedmont Hospital or Wesley Memorial Hospital (now Emory University Hospital). Michael Hoke, M.D., was named the first medical director. The Home was originally a rented cottage in Decatur, Georgia, United States, with six beds. As the "Scottish Rite Hospital for Crippled Children", six of its buildings are listed on the National Register of Historic Places.

== History ==
In 1913, Ed Roberts, while serving as a member of a train crew out of Atlanta, Georgia, was involved in a train wreck that both crushed his leg and dislocated his hip. Roberts returned to Atlanta to convalesce. Roberts contacted Forrest Adair, a friend, and fellow Masonic Lodge member.

During that same year, Michael Hoke, M.D., cured Mrs. William C. "Bertie" Wardlaw's young nephew, a college student, of a serious bone infection. To honor Dr. Hoke, Wardlaw started raising money to open a crippled children's hospital. With the aid of longtime friend and financier Forrest Adair, she approached the Scottish Rite Freemasons for their help in underwriting the proposed hospital. To honor the Masons' contributions, Wardlaw added "Scottish Rite" to the facility's name. In 1915, the hospital opened as Scottish Rite Convalescent Hospital for Crippled Children.

=== Expansion ===
The Convalescent Home soon expanded two rented cottages after funds were raised for the care of needy children by Mrs. Wardlaw and other philanthropic Atlantans (most notable Scottish Rite Masons). The facility could house 18 patients (20 if needs pressed).

=== New buildings ===
- Scottish Rite Hospital for Crippled Children
- U.S. National Register of Historic Places
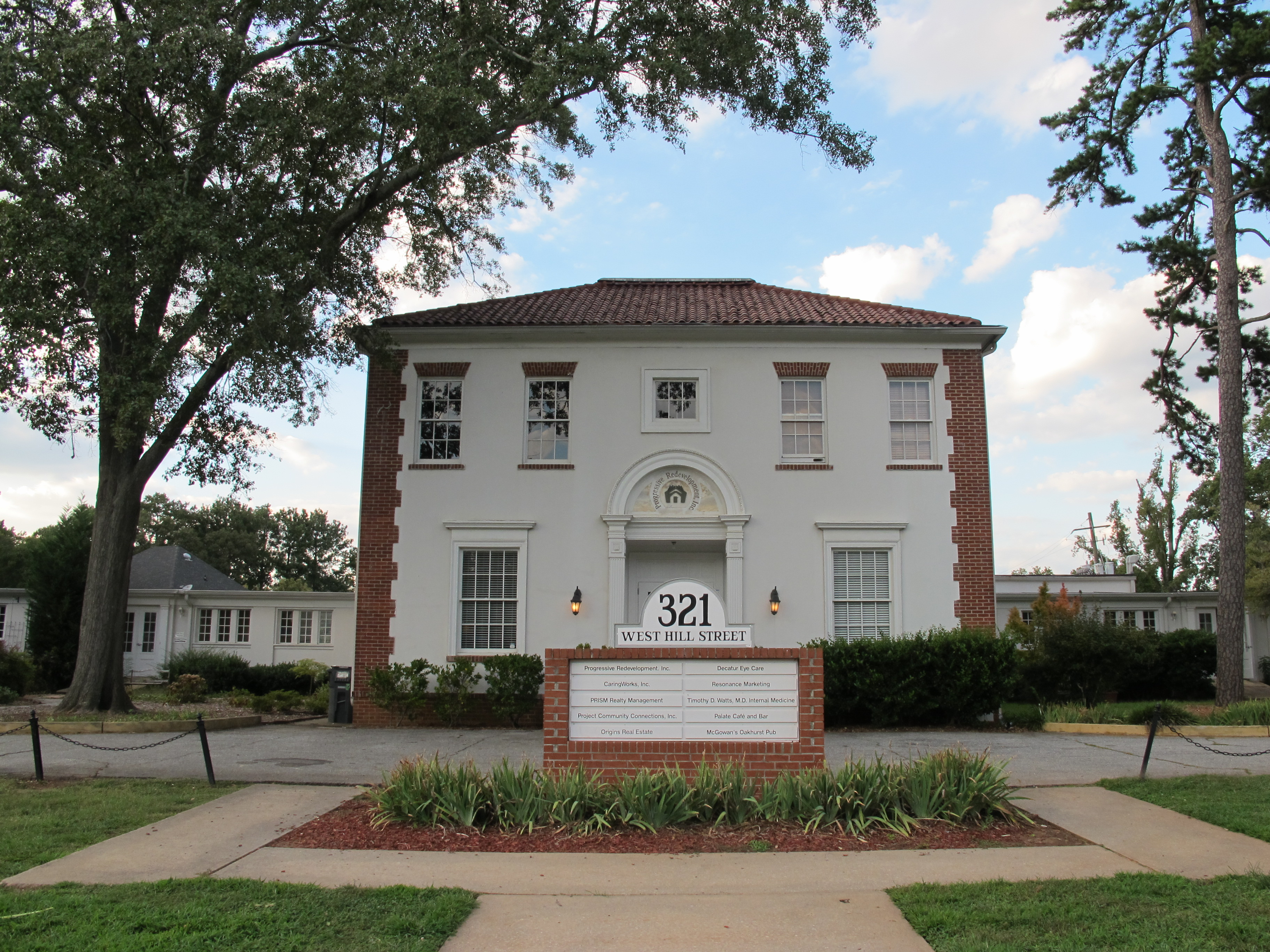
- Old Scottish Rite Hospital, September 2012

- Location within Atlanta Location within Georgia Location within the United States
- Location: 321 West Hill Street; Decatur, Georgia; United States
- Coordinates: 33°45′36″N 84°18′9″W
- Area: 4.8 acres (1.9 ha)
- Built: 1919
- Architect: Reid, Neel
- Architectural style: Colonial Revival
- NRHP reference No.: 82004665 and 04000929
- Added to NRHP: June 17, 1982 (with 5 contributing buildings); September 4, 2004 (with one contributing building)

A new building was designed by two architects, Neel Reid and Hal Hentz, of the firm Hentz, Reid and Adler in Atlanta, Georgia. The building was completed in 1919, and could originally serve 50 patients. Along with a new facility came a new name: Scottish Rite Hospital for Crippled Children. Until the 1930s, few drugs were available to treat crippling childhood diseases so the original hospital design reflected the emphasis then given to providing young patients with plenty of sunshine and fresh air. The Georgian Revival style buildings were designed with a southern exposure, allowing for plenty of sunshine. The ward buildings on each side of the central administration building included generous windows, including clerestory windows above the main roof-line to provide additional interior light. The buildings were sited to allow ventilation in warm weather.

The design also included light and air-filled areas for play and rest. Each ward had a glass-enclosed sun or play room. Sliding glass doors fronted each ward and originally led to screened porches. Bedridden children could be wheeled onto these porches or even onto paved terraces in front, to rest or play in the open air. When new medicines that became available to treat childhood diseases in the 1940s the importance of the screened porches was reduced. Steel casement windows have enclosed these porches since that time. Two other main buildings were added later. A service annex, built prior to World War II is a one-storied addition attached to the north side of the administration building. Nurses quarters were built following World War II to the east of the hospital in a separate building.

A 4.8-acre (1.9 ha) property with five contributing buildings was listed on the National Register of Historic Places in 1982 as "Scottish Rite Hospital for Crippled Children".

Another NRHP listing, also for "Scottish Rite Hospital for Crippled Children", at the same address and with the same property area but including just one contributing building, was added in 2004.

The building and property were abandoned. The Community Center of South Decatur was incorporated in 1979 to facilitate the redevelopment of the old Scottish Rite Children's Hospital. The size of the facility, and the cost of its maintenance, led to a decline in the condition of the property owing to a lack of financial resources. In 1997, the City of Decatur began looking for a developer for the Scottish Rite property who would work to rehabilitate the historic buildings, provide new single-family housing for the neighborhood, help to enhance the Oakhurst business district, return some part of the property to the tax roles. Progressive Redevelopment Incorporated and the Housing Resource Center submitted a plan for the site: the rehabilitation and adaptive re-use of the property, including the construction of 14 new accessible apartment units for people from the Shepherd Center who have a temporary or permanent disabilities, and the introduction of new single family affordable homes.

From December 1997-March 1999, the building's east wing was rented by the West Hill Concept Union, a collective of visual and performance artists, who used it as a studio, exhibition and performance space. During that time, the building hosted 10 shows and events, including seminal performances by the Theodor Adorno Jazz Quartet.

=== Modern usage ===
Now the buildings are not a hospital. A full-service bar is located in the west wing. Offices are located in the main building. The east wing is leased to the Community Center of South Decatur, as is the former laundry building. The east wing is home to the Solarium, community meeting space and a rental facility for weddings and other private gatherings. The nurses quarters were sold to help finance the main building renovations, and have been converted into office space.

== Different location ==
The hospital moved north of Atlanta, Georgia in the 1970s. The Scottish Rite Hospital merged with Egleston Children's Health Care System in 1998 to create Children's Healthcare of Atlanta (CHOA). In 2006 CHoA and Grady Health System announced that an affiliate of CHoA would assume responsibility for the management of services at Hughes Spalding Children's Hospital.

== See also ==
- National Register of Historic Places listings in DeKalb County, Georgia
- Shriners Hospital for Crippled Children (Portland, Oregon)
- Texas Scottish Rite Hospital for Children

== Bibliography ==
- "Adair Bankruptcy", from Time Magazine
- "The Solarium: History", from the Community Center of South Decatur
- "Children's Healthcare of Atlanta", from the New Georgia Encyclopedia
- "Children's Healthcare of Atlanta History", from Children's Healthcare of Atlanta
- "Historic Scottish Rite Hospital Campus", from Progressive Redevelopment, Inc.
- "Scottish Rite Hospital", from masonicinfo.com
- "Photo of Mr. Forrest Adair", from Georgia Archives
