= Marquam Hill, Portland, Oregon =

Coordinates: 45.500118°N 122.692318°W

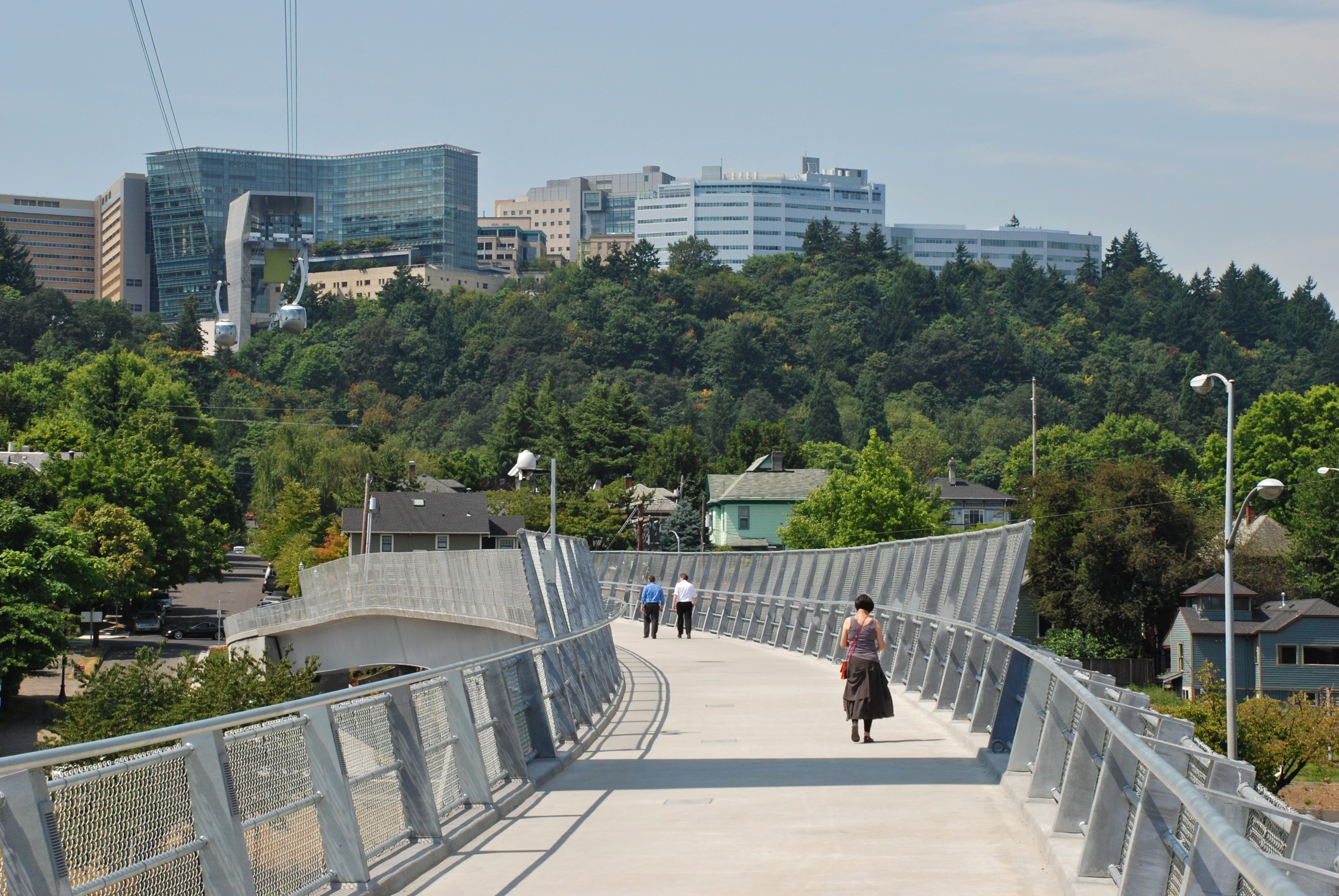
View of Marquam Hill and OHSU from the Gibbs Street Pedestrian Bridge

Marquam Hill is a populated hill located just south of Downtown Portland, Oregon, United States in the Homestead neighborhood. It is also called Pill Hill because it is home to Oregon Health & Science University, Portland VA Medical Center and Shriners Children's Portland.

Marquam Hill was named for Philip A. Marquam. It is classed by the United States Geological Survey as a populated place and not as a hill. It is part of the Tualatin Mountains, along with nearby Council Crest and Portland Heights.

Development of the huge medical complex on Marquam Hill started in 1917 with an initial 20-acre tract donated by the Oregon-Washington Railroad and Navigation Company and an 88-acre tract donated by the family of Sam Jackson, former publisher of the Oregon Journal. At present, the OHSU land comprises an area of 116 acres.
