= Emma May Laney =

American college professor

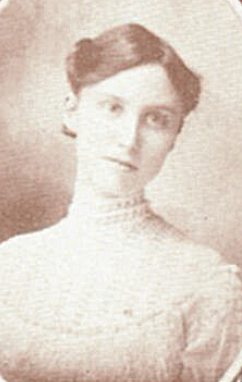
- Emma May Laney, from the 1905 yearbook of the Mississippi State College for Women
- Born: November 27, 1886; Shannon, Mississippi
- Died: March 26, 1969 (age 82); Denver, Colorado
- Occupation: College professor
- Known for: Correspondence with Robert Frost

Emma May Laney (November 27, 1886 – March 26, 1969) was an American college professor who taught English at Agnes Scott College in Georgia for 37 years, and a friend of poet Robert Frost.

== Early life and education ==
Emma May Laney was born in Shannon, Mississippi, the daughter of William Ervyn Laney and Elizabeth Harkey Laney. Her father died when she was a little girl. She graduated from the Mississippi Industrial Institute & College in 1905, where her classmates included librarian Nannie Herndon Rice, physician Mary Maxwell Hathorn, and home economist Connie J. Bonslagel, and her English professor was Pauline Van de Graaf Orr. She pursued further studies at the University of Chicago, earned a master's degree from Columbia University in 1911, and completed doctoral studies in English at Yale University (1930). Her dissertation was a study of the work of Richard Steele.

== Career ==
Laney taught at her alma mater's summer normal program in 1909, and at Queens College in Charlotte, North Carolina, early in her career. She was an English professor at Agnes Scott College in Decatur, Georgia, for 37 years. She was a summer visiting professor at Hunter College. In 1932, she was one of the speakers in a weekly lecture series at Warm Springs Institute. In 1952 she represented Agnes Scott College at the inauguration of the new president of the Mississippi State College for Women.

In 1935, as chair of the college's lecture program, she invited Robert Frost to speak on campus, which he then did annually from 1945 to 1962. Frost and Laney became friends and correspondents. Frost sent Laney autographed copies of his books, and Laney donated those copies and their letters to the library at Agnes Scott College. When Laney retired in 1956, Frost wrote to the president of Agnes Scott College to say "it was my great admiration for her that so interested me in her college, to watch its success and sing its praises."

Laney was an active member of the Southern Association of College Women, and a member of Phi Beta Kappa. In 1948 she was made an honorary member of the Agnes Scott College chapter of Mortar Board.

== Personal life ==
Laney traveled and studied in Europe during some of her summers. She retired in 1956, and moved to Denver, Colorado, to live with her sister Lula. Another sister, Corinne, was dean of women and a Latin professor at Berry College before she died in a car accident in 1936. Laney died in 1969, in Denver, at the age of 82.
