= Elizabeth Kiss =

American philosopher (born 1961)

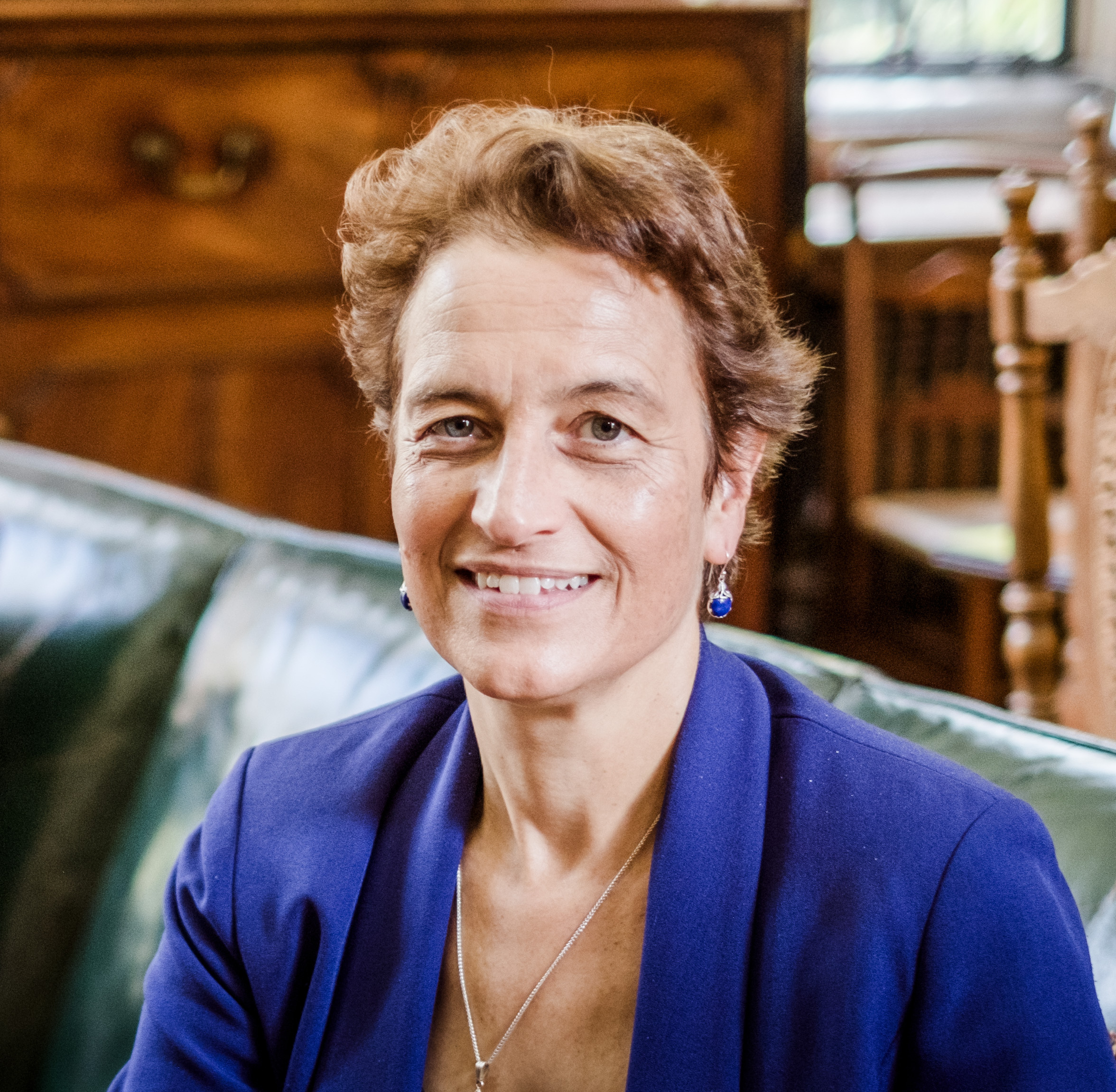
- Kiss in 2018

20th President of Union College
- Incumbent
- Assumed office July 1, 2025
- Preceded by: David R. Harris

Warden of Rhodes House and Chief Executive Officer of Rhodes Trust
- In office 2018–2024
- Preceded by: Charles R. Conn
- Succeeded by: Chrystia Freeland (Note: Richard Trainor served in the interim.)

President of Agnes Scott College
- In office 2006 – July 2018
- Preceded by: Mary Brown Bullock
- Succeeded by: Leocadia I. Zak

Personal details
- Education: Davidson College; Balliol College, Oxford

Elizabeth Kiss (/ˈkiːʃ/ KEESH; born 1961) is an American philosopher and academic administrator, specialising in moral and political philosophy. She is the 20th and current president of Union College.

Formerly in 2018, she was the Warden of Rhodes House, Oxford University, and CEO of the Rhodes Trust. She was responsible for administering the Rhodes Scholarship, providing pastoral support to existing Rhodes Scholars and coordinating the Rhodes Trust. She was the first woman to hold this role. Previously she served as president of Agnes Scott College.

== Early life and education ==
Kiss's parents along with her two older siblings emigrated from Hungary to the United States in 1956 following the Hungarian Revolution. She was born in New York City and earned her undergraduate degree in 1983 from Davidson College in North Carolina, where she graduated Omicron Delta Kappa. Kiss became involved with student activism during her time at Davidson College, setting up the college's Amnesty International chapter and becoming the first female Davidson student to win a Rhodes Scholarship. She noted that her two older siblings' taste in 1960s music and political activism sparked her interest in ethics, politics, and human rights. She received a D.Phil. from Balliol College in 1990.

== Career ==
Much of Kiss's research has focused on political philosophy and moral education which she believes is essential to personal and professional development.

From 1997 to 2006, Kiss was the founding director of the Kenan Institute for Ethics at Duke University in Durham, North Carolina.

She served as the eighth President of Agnes Scott College in Decatur, Georgia from 2006 to 2018. In 2015, she devised the SUMMIT curriculum at the college, which aims to provide students with a core curriculum where leadership development and global learning are the focuses. As college president, she changed the institution's demographic to include one-third African-American students.

In August 2018, Kiss began her tenure as Warden of Rhodes House at the University of Oxford, home of the Rhodes Scholarship, and CEO of the Rhodes Trust. She is the first woman to hold these positions.

In February 2025, it was announced that Kiss would serve as the 20th president of Union College, in Schenectady, NY.

== Select honours and awards ==
- Council for the Advancement and Support of Education (CASE) District III Chief Executive Leadership Award, 2018.
- Named one of the Eight Most Influential People in US Higher Education by the Chronicle of Higher Education, 2017.
- The American Council on Education Award for Institutional Transformation (for Agnes Scott College), 2017.
- Turknett Leadership Character Award for Higher Education, 2007.
