= 31st Mississippi Infantry Regiment =

19th century confederate infantry unit from Mississippi

- Active: 1862–1865
- Country: Confederate States
- Allegiance: Mississippi
- Branch: Confederate States Army
- Type: Infantry
- Size: Regiment
- Battles: American Civil War: Battle of Baton Rouge; Battle of Champion Hill; Jackson expedition; Meridian campaign; Atlanta campaign; Battle of Decatur; Battle of Franklin; Battle of Nashville; Carolinas Campaign

Commanders
- Notable commanders: Jehu Amaziah Orr

The 31st Mississippi Infantry Regiment was a unit of the Confederate States Army in the American Civil War. The 31st Mississippi fought in many major battles of the Western theater, and was virtually annihilated during the Atlanta Campaign and subsequent Franklin-Nashville Campaign.

== History ==
Initially organized as the 6th Mississippi Infantry Battalion, additional companies were added to bring the battalion up to regimental strength in March, 1862, and the unit was redesignated as the 31st Infantry Regiment. The 6th battalion was organized by Jehu Amaziah Orr, a delegate to both the Mississippi Secession Convention and Provisional Confederate Congress who was then elected colonel of the new regiment.

The regiment entered service as the Confederates were evacuating the North Mississippi railroad junction at Corinth, and joined the forces concentrating at Vicksburg along the Mississippi river. Under General Benjamin Hardin Helm, the 31st took part in the unsuccessful attempt to recapture Baton Rouge in August, 1862, losing 16 killed and 31 wounded.

The regiment took part in various movements through Mississippi in 1862, was assigned to General Winfield S. Featherston's brigade, and then fought at the Battle of Champion Hill in May 1863 as General Ulysses S. Grant's Union troops closed in on the vital strongpoint of Vicksburg. The 31st then fought against General William T. Sherman's troops when they moved against Jackson in July 1863.

In early 1864, Colonel Orr of the 31st Regiment left his army post after being elected to the Confederate Congress, and Lieutenant Colonel Marcus D.L. Stephens took command during actions opposing General Sherman's Meridian campaign in February of that year. The 31st was then sent to Georgia to take part in the Atlanta campaign, fighting at Resaca, Cassville, New Hope Church, Kennesaw Mountain, Atlanta, and Ezra Church. At Peachtree Creek on July 20, the regiment came under heavy fire and took severe casualties, suffering 164 men killed, wounded, or captured of the 215 engaged that day. The fire was so severe that every officer of the regiment at the rank of captain or above was killed or wounded. Denis Buckley, a Union soldier of the 136th New York who was subsequently killed at Peachtree Creek, captured the regimental colors of the 31st Mississippi during the battle and was posthumously awarded the Medal of Honor for his actions.

During the subsequent Franklin–Nashville campaign, the 31st fought at the Battle of Decatur in October, 1864, taking further casualties, and the Battle of Franklin, where the regiment lost another 45 killed and 100 wounded during bloody assaults on the Federal lines. Colonel Stephens, commanding the regiment, was severely wounded at Franklin and briefly captured by Union troops. The regiment fought at the Battle of Nashville, December 15-16, and then acted as rearguard while the Confederates began to retreat. By the end of 1864, the regiment only had 93 men left, less than the size of a regular infantry company.

In the spring of 1865, the remnants of the 31st Mississippi took part in the Carolinas Campaign, fighting at Kinston and Bentonville. The 31st was consolidated with the 3rd, 33rd, and 40th Mississippi regiments on April 9, and the Confederate forces in North Carolina surrendered on April 26, 1865.

== Commanders ==
Commanders of the 31st Mississippi Infantry:

- Col. Jehu Amaziah Orr, resigned commission after being elected to the Confederate Congress, March 1864.
- Col. Marcus D.L. Stephens, wounded at Franklin.
- Lt. Col. James W. Drane, wounded at Peachtree Creek.

== See also ==
- List of Mississippi Civil War Confederate units
