= Daney =

Daney is a surname. Notable people with the surname include:

- Art Daney (1904–1988), American baseball player
- Daniel Daney (1905–1985), French boxer
- George Daney (1946–1990), American football player
- Serge Daney (1944–1992), French film critic

== See also ==
- Laney (surname)
