= Laney (surname) =

Laney is a surname. Notable people with the surname include:

- Al Laney (Albert Gillis Laney; 1896–1988), American sportswriter
- Benjamin Lany or Laney (1591–1675), Bishop of Ely
- Benjamin Travis Laney (1896–1977), Governor of Arkansas
- Betnijah Laney-Hamilton (born 1993), American basketball player
- Bill Laney (William Ross Laney; 1913–1998), New Zealand politician
- Brendan Laney (born 1973), professional rugby union player
- Chris Laney, bassist/guitarist and former member of Whiskeytown
- Danielle Laney, 1992 Olympic bronze medalist in taekwondo
- David Laney (born 1949), Amtrak board chairman
- Deanna Laney, American murderer
- Emma May Laney (1886–1969), American college professor
- Francis Towner Laney, influential member of science fiction fandom and editor of the Hugo Award nominee The Acolyte
- James T. Laney (1927–2026), educator and ambassador
- Jason Laney (born 1973), English cricketer
- John Laney (died 1633), English politician
- Lucy Craft Laney (1854–1933), African-American educator
- Malcolm Laney (1910–1985), American basketball coach
- Pete Laney (James Earl Laney; born 1943), American Democratic politician
