= Leocadia I. Zak =

American government official

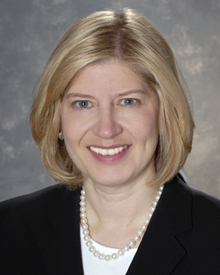

9th President of Agnes Scott College
- Incumbent
- Assumed office July 1, 2018
- Preceded by: Elizabeth Kiss

Personal details
- Born: Leocadia Irine Zak Lynn, Massachusetts, U.S.
- Spouse: Kenneth Hansen
- Education: Mount Holyoke College (BA); Northeastern University (JD)

Leocadia Irine Zak serves as the ninth president of Agnes Scott College in Decatur, Georgia. Prior to that, Zak served as director of the U.S. Trade and Development Agency (USTDA), where she led an agency dedicated to encouraging economic growth in emerging markets and the export of U.S. goods and services to those markets. After being nominated by President Barack Obama in November 2009, Zak was confirmed by the U.S. Senate on March 10, 2010.

== Background ==
Leocadia I. Zak served as acting director of the U.S. Trade and Development Agency beginning in 2009 until she was confirmed as director by the United States Senate on March 10, 2010. She served as director of USTDA until 2018. Prior to that she was the general counsel (2000–2006) and deputy director (2006–2009) of USTDA.

Prior to joining USTDA, Zak was a partner in the Washington, D.C., and Boston offices of Mintz, Levin, Cohn, Ferris, Glovsky and Popeo, P.C. practicing in the areas of corporate, municipal and international finance. She served as counsel in connection with a variety of finance transactions for energy, transportation, healthcare, telecommunications and tourism projects.

Zak was also an adjunct professor of law and has taught international project finance at the Boston University School of Law, at the Morin Center for Banking and Financial Law Studies, and at the Georgetown University Law Center.

Zak received her B.A. from Mount Holyoke College, which has named her to its Women of Influence Gallery. Her J.D. is from Northeastern University School of Law.

In 2018, Zak began serving as a member of Rotary International in Atlanta. Zak also serves as a trustee of Global Communities and as a member of the Truist Financial Atlanta Advisory Council.

She became the ninth president of Agnes Scott College in July 2018. Her tenure has focused on operational efficiency, enrollment, fundraising, and an expansion of the college's academics with new components to its SUMMIT curriculum, namely the Sophomore Class Atlanta Leadership Experience and Applied Career Experiences, as well as the creation of graduate-level programs.

== Views ==
Zak maintains specific views on a variety of development issues given her worldwide responsibilities to providing foreign assistance to emerging economies around the world.

On January 6, 2013, Zak was featured in a segment on Bloomberg's "Capitol Gains" television show entitled "Boosting American Exports Around the World." profiling USTDA.

On a visit to Jakarta in March 2010, Zak responded to concerns over U.S. – Indonesia relations that clean energy deployment will foster inclusive economic development in Indonesia.

She wrote in Airport Consulting that the economic downturn has prompted many U.S. firms to consider expansion opportunities abroad as a means to deal with the contraction of the U.S. market.

In testimony before the House Committee on Foreign Affairs, Subcommittee on Africa and Global Health and the Committee on Energy and Commerce, Subcommittee on Commerce, Trade and Consumer Protection on June 24, 2009, Zak said that the exploration of new markets are a vital element for stimulating the U.S. economy and that African development and trade must be a priority.

== Videos ==
External videos: Movie clip of Bloomberg Government's "Capitol Gains" television show interview with USTDA Director Leocadia I. Zak, Video on Bloomberg TV website

Political offices
Preceded by Larry Walther	Trade and Development Agency; 2009–2018	Succeeded by TBD
