= Denis Buckley (Medal of Honor) =

- Born: c. 1844; Lindsay, Canada West
- Died: July 20, 1864 (aged 19–20); Fulton County, Georgia, U.S.
- Burial place: Marietta National Cemetery, Marietta, Georgia, U.S.
- Military career
- Allegiance: United States of America
- Branch: United States Army; Union Army
- Service years: 1862–1864
- Rank: Private
- Unit: (New York (state)) 136th Regiment New York Volunteer Infantry - Company G
- Conflicts: American Civil War; Battle of Salem Church (POW); Battle of Peachtree Creek †
- Awards: Medal of Honor

Denis (or Dennis) Buckley (c. 1844 – July 20, 1864) was a Canadian-born soldier who fought in the American Civil War. Buckley received the country's highest award for bravery during combat, the Medal of Honor, for his action during the Battle of Peachtree Creek in Georgia on July 20, 1864. He was honored with the award on April 7, 1865.

== Biography ==
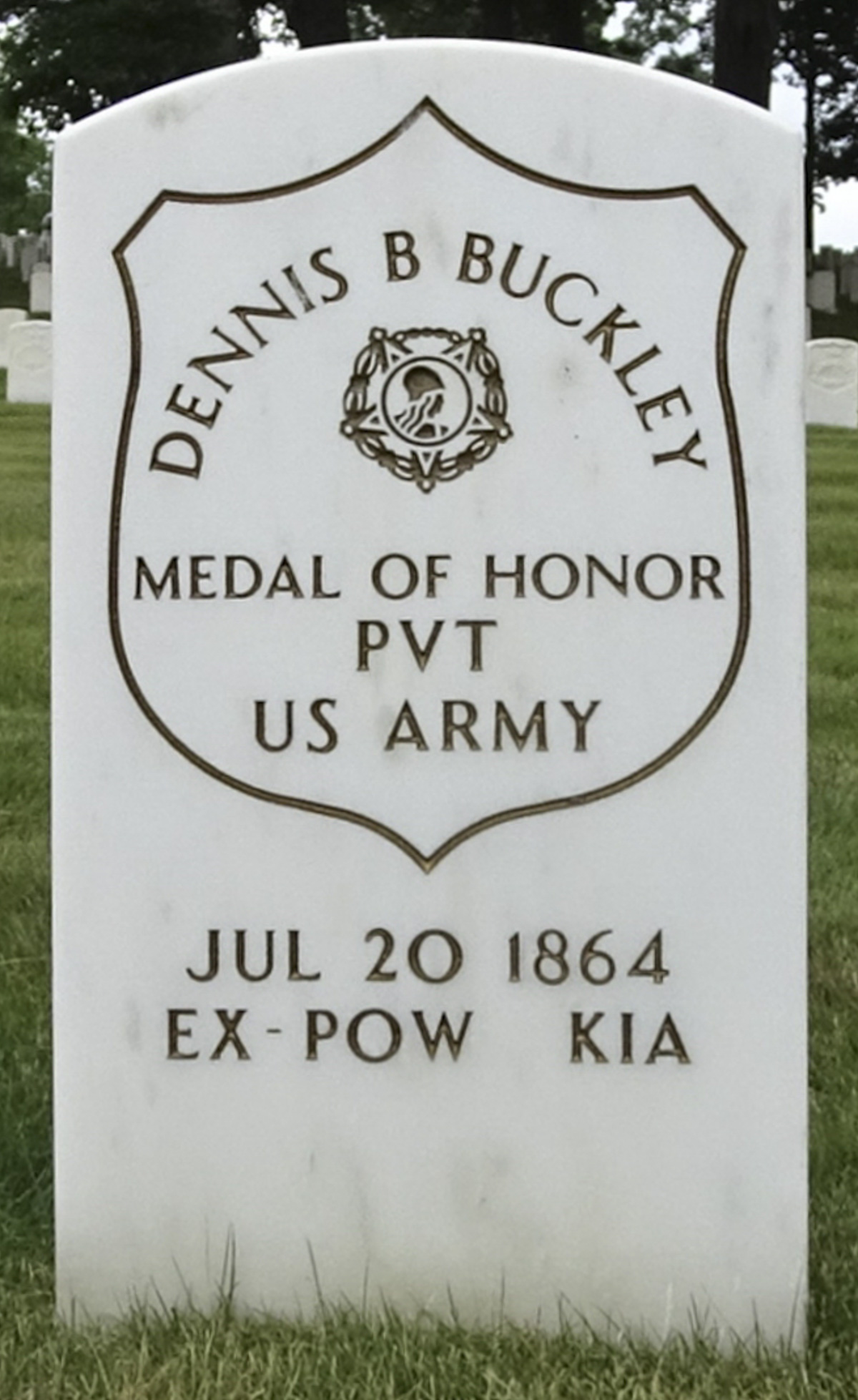
Gravestone at Marietta National Cemetery

Buckley was born in Canada in about 1844. He joined the 136th New York Volunteer Infantry from Avon, New York on August 12, 1862. Buckley was killed in action on July 20, 1864, at the Battle of Peachtree Creek, and his remains are interred at the Marietta National Cemetery in Marietta, Georgia.

== Medal of Honor citation ==
Capture of flag of 31st Mississippi (Confederate States of America).

== See also ==
- List of American Civil War Medal of Honor recipients: A–F
