= Nannie Herndon Rice =

American librarian

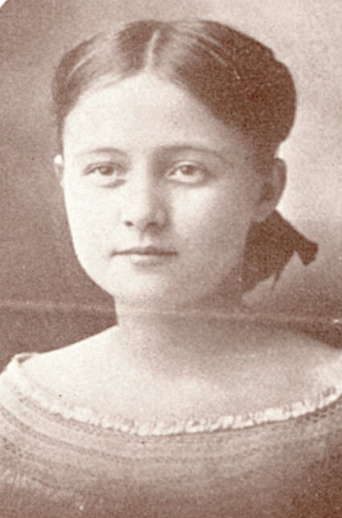
- Nannie Herndon Rice, from the 1905 yearbook of the Mississippi Industrial Institute & College
- Born: November 30, 1886; Starkville, Mississippi
- Died: March 6, 1963 (aged 76); Starkville, Mississippi
- Occupations: Suffragist, writer, librarian
- Relatives: Arthur F. Hopkins (great-grandfather)

Nannie Herndon Rice (November 30, 1886 – March 6, 1963) was an American suffragist, writer, and college librarian, based in Mississippi. She worked at the Mississippi State University library from 1916 to 1957, and was president of the Mississippi Library Association.

== Early life and education ==
Rice was born in Starkville, Mississippi, the daughter of Arthur Hopkins Rice and Frances Mary Smith Rice. Her father was a physician. Her great-grandfather Arthur F. Hopkins was a railroad president and state Supreme Court justice in Alabama. She graduated from the Mississippi Industrial Institute & College in 1905, and held further degrees from Columbia University (1911) and the University of Illinois (1932, in library science).

== Career ==
Rice was an assistant at the Industrial Institute & College after she graduated. She taught English at St. Mary's College in Dallas, Texas. She spent most of her career as a librarian at the Mississippi Agricultural and Mechanical College (now Mississippi State University), from 1916 until her retirement in 1957.

Rice wrote poetry, book reviews, and essays. She was president of the Mississippi Library Association in the 1930s. She was a speaker at the MIssissippi Library Association's general meeting in 1938.

After H. L. Mencken wrote a series of articles describing the American South as a cultural desert, Rice wrote an essay in defense of Mississippi, which Mencken published in The American Mercury, in January 1926. She also wrote book reviews and poetry, published under the names "Anne Coke" and "Ann Cook". After her death, an anthology of her writings was published by her nephew, Frederic F. Mellen.

Rice was elected recording secretary and corresponding secretary of the Mississippi Woman Suffrage Association; her former professor Pauline Van de Graaf Orr was the association's president. She was also active in the Mississippi Association for the Preservation of Wild Life, the American Library Association, and the American Association of University Women.

== Personal life and legacy ==
Rice lived most of her life in Meadow Woods, her family's historic plantation home in Oktibbeha County. She died there in 1963, at the age of 76. Her family donated a large collection of her papers to Mississippi State University. An oil portrait of Rice was displayed at Mississippi State University's Mitchell Memorial Library. A residence hall at Mississippi State is named Rice Hall in her memory.
