= Arthur F. Hopkins =

American judge (1794–1865)

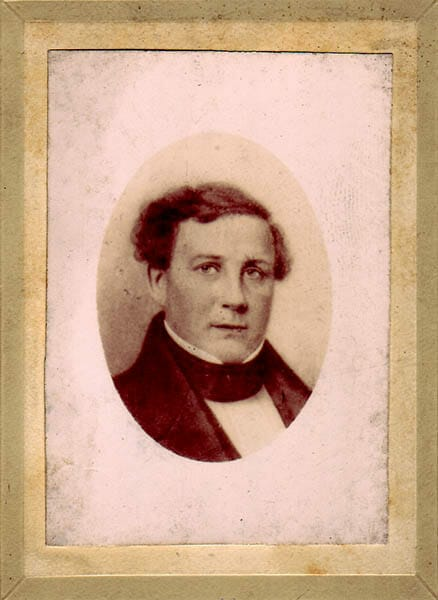

Arthur Francis Hopkins (October 18, 1794 – November 10, 1865) was a justice of the Supreme Court of Alabama from 1836 to 1837.

== Biography ==
Born in Danville, Virginia, Arthur Francis Hopkins was admitted to the Virginia Bar in 1814. Two years later, he settled in Huntsville, Alabama, which was then Mississippi Territory, to practice law. In 1819, he moved to Lawrence County and launched his public service career. He first as a member of the Alabama Constitutional Convention of 1819 and then as his county's delegate to the State Senate (1822–24).

After practicing law in Huntsville for several years, Hopkins was elected to the legislature in 1833 as a representative of Madison County. Hopkins was elected associate justice of the Supreme Court in 1836.

In 1837, Governor Hugh McVay chose him to succeed Henry Hitchcock as chief justice. After serving nearly a year in that capacity, he resigned in June and resumed his law practice. He served as temporary chairman of the Whig National Convention in 1844. In 1845, Hopkins went to St. Louis for about a year, then returned to Alabama to settle in Mobile, where he established a successful law practice. He became president of the Mobile and Ohio Railroad in 1855 and continued in that position for several years. Hopkins was married in 1815 to Pamela Mosely. After Pamela Hopkins's death, he remarried, to Juliet Opie, in 1854 until his own death. Mississippi librarian and suffragist Nannie Herndon Rice was Hopkins's great-granddaughter.

== Death ==
Arthur Hopkins died on November 10, 1865, in Mobile, Alabama, aged 71.

Party political offices
Vacant Title last held by Enoch Parsons	Whig nominee for Governor of Alabama; 1839	Succeeded by James W. McLung
Preceded by Harry I. Thornton Sr.	Justice of the Supreme Court of Alabama; 1837–1837	Succeeded by John James Ormond
