= Jehu Amaziah Orr =

American politician (1828–1921)

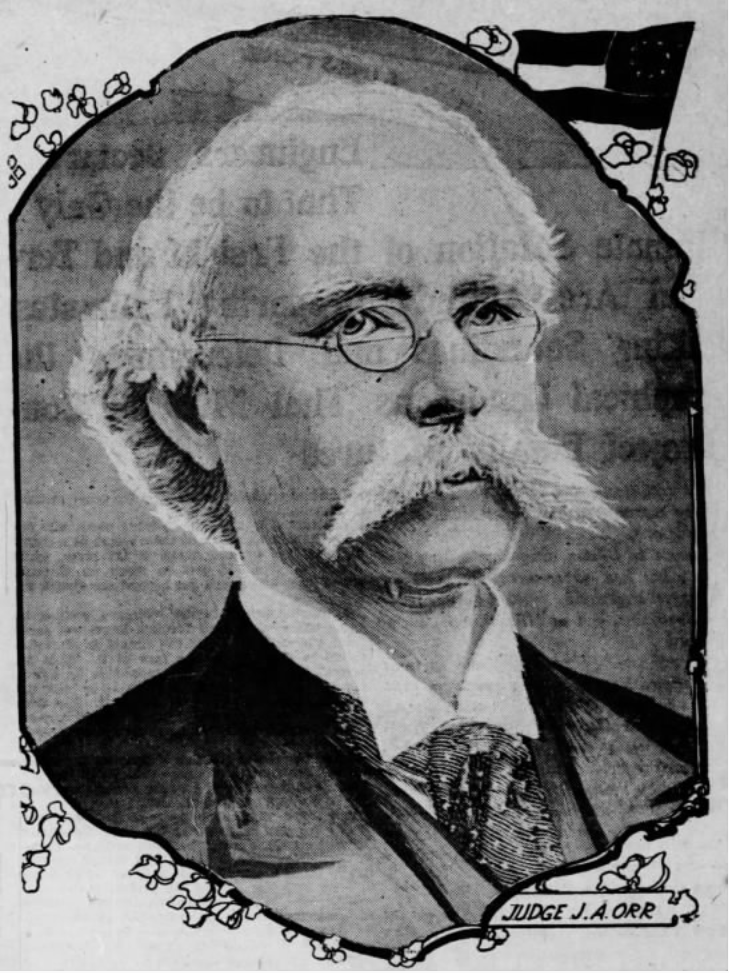

Member of the Confederate House of Representatives for Mississippi
- In office May 2, 1864 – March 18, 1865

Member of the Provisional Congress of the Confederate States for Mississippi
- In office April 29, 1861 – February 17, 1862

Personal details
- Born: May 10, 1828 Anderson County, South Carolina
- Died: March 10, 1921 (aged 92) New York, New York
- Party: Democratic
- Children: Pauline Van de Graaf Orr
- Relatives: James L. Orr (brother)
- Education: College of New Jersey
- Occupation: Lawyer, politician

Military service
- Allegiance: Confederate States of America
- Branch/service: Confederate States Army
- Years of service: 1862–64
- Rank: Colonel
- Commands: 31st Mississippi Infantry
- Battles/wars: American Civil War: Siege of Corinth; Vicksburg Campaign

Jehu Amaziah Orr (May 10, 1828 – March 10, 1921) was an American lawyer, slaveowner, army officer, and politician who served in the Confederate States Congress representing Mississippi during the American Civil War.

== Biography ==
Orr was born in Anderson County, South Carolina. He was the younger brother of James L. Orr. He earned his Bachelor of Arts from the College of New Jersey (later renamed Princeton University) in 1849, and later returned to receive a Master of Arts in 1857. He later moved to Mississippi, where he was a member of the state legislature in 1852. In his new home state, Orr became a wealthy planter, holding forty eight people as slaves in 1860.

Initially a Unionist, Orr later supported the cause of secession and was a delegate to the Mississippi state secession convention in January, 1861. When Representative William Sydney Wilson resigned from his seat in the Provisional Congress of the Confederate States, Orr was selected to fill the vacancy, taking office on April 29, 1861. In the next election to the first regular Confederate Congress, Orr lost his seat to Jeremiah Watkins Clapp.

After leaving the Provisional Congress, Orr organized a Confederate States Army unit, the 6th Infantry Battalion, which later was mustered into service as the 31st Mississippi Infantry Regiment. Orr was elected colonel of the regiment, leading it in several battles during the Vicksburg Campaign.

Orr ran for office again in 1863 and returned as a representative in the Second Confederate Congress, resigning his army post in March 1864. Regaining office in the same year that the Confederacy's prospects for victory began to decline, Orr turned against the administration of Confederate President Jefferson Davis, voting against most of the President's initiatives and nominations presented to Congress.

After the war he served as a state court judge from 1870 to 1876, and was a trustee of the University of Mississippi for more than 30 years. He died at the home of his daughter, suffragist and educator Pauline Van de Graaf Orr, in New York on March 10, 1921. When he died aged 93, he was the second-to-last surviving member of the Confederate Congress.
