= 1839 Alabama gubernatorial election =

- August 3, 1839
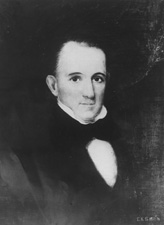

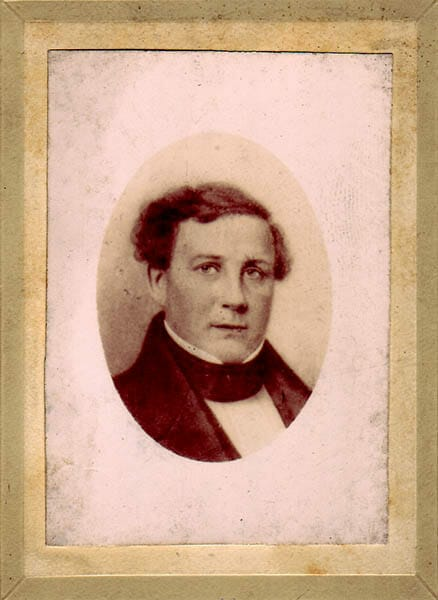
Nominee	Arthur P. Bagby	Arthur F. Hopkins
Party	Democratic	Whig
Popular vote	20,451	1,708
Percentage	92.29%	7.71%
- County results Bagby: 50–60% 60–70% 70–80% 80–90% >90% Hopkins: 50–60% Unknown/No Vote
Governor before election
Arthur P. Bagby
Democratic
Elected Governor
Arthur P. Bagby
Democratic

The 1839 Alabama gubernatorial election was an election held on August 3, 1839, to elect the Governor of Alabama. Incumbent Governor Arthur P. Bagby defeated Whig Party candidate Arthur F. Hopkins with 92.29% of the vote.

== General election ==
=== Candidates ===
- Arthur P. Bagby, incumbent governor
- Arthur F. Hopkins, former Alabama Supreme Court Chief Justice (1836–1837)

=== Results ===
1839 Alabama gubernatorial election
Party	Candidate	Votes	%	±%
Democratic	Arthur P. Bagby (incumbent)	20,451	92.29%	+37.50%
Whig	Arthur F. Hopkins	1,708	7.71%	+7.71%
Total votes		18,743	92.29%	N/A
Democratic hold				
