= Juliet Opie Hopkins =

American nurse and philanthropist (1818–1890)

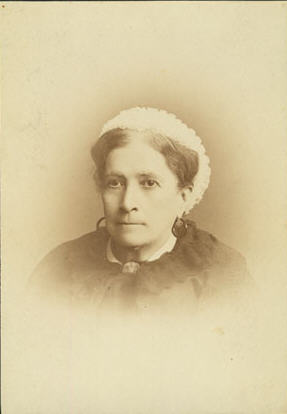
- "The Florence Nightingale of the South"
- Born: Juliet Ann Opie; May 7, 1818; Jefferson County, Virginia, US
- Died: March 9, 1890 (aged 71); Washington, D.C., US
- Resting place: Arlington National Cemetery
- Education: Miss Ritchie's private school
- Known for: Nursing
- Spouse(s): Alexander George Gordon (1837-1847/49; his death); Arthur Francis Hopkins (1854–65; his death)
- Children: Juliet Opie Hopkins Ayres (adopted)

Juliet Ann Hopkins (née Opie; May 7, 1818 – March 9, 1890) was an American nurse and philanthropist, who set up three hospitals in Alabama in the 1860s.

After her marriage to Arthur F. Hopkins of Mobile, Alabama, she relocated to that state. During the Civil War, the couple sold most of their real estate holdings and donated the money to the cause of the Confederate States of America. When her husband was appointed to oversee hospitals during the war, she went to work converting tobacco factories into hospitals. She made daily visits to the wounded, and received a battlefield injury in the course of her duties.

Her husband died within months of the close of the war, and she spent the rest of her life in poverty. When she died, she was interred with a full military burial at Arlington National Cemetery, with the Alabama congressional delegation serving as her pallbearers. In 1991, she was inducted into the Alabama Women's Hall of Fame.

== Early life ==
Juliet Ann Opie was born in 1818 on her parents' Jefferson County, Virginia plantation "Woodburn", which employed slave labor. The area is in present-day West Virginia. Her father, Hierome Lindsay Opie, owned an estimated 2,000 slaves and was a delegate to the 1829 Virginia Constitutional Convention that reaffirmed slavery while granting some concessions to underrepresented western Virginia. She was home schooled until she was enrolled at Miss Ritchie's private institution in Richmond, Virginia. Her mother Margaret Muse Opie died when Juliet was sixteen years old, and she was called home to handle her mother's duties at the plantation. Her first husband in 1837 was Alexander George Gordon, who died in either 1847 or 1849.

She married a widower, Arthur Francis Hopkins, on November 4, 1854. Twenty-three years older than Juliet, he was born in Virginia on October 18, 1794. His father had been a participant in the Revolutionary War. He studied law and opened a practice in Alabama. Prior to marrying Juliet, he had already served as an Alabama state senator, and as Chief Justice of the Alabama Supreme Court.

The couple made their home in Mobile. Juliet bore no children from either of her marriages, but she and Hopkins adopted a niece who was named after her.

== Hospital work ==
Alabama officially adopted its Ordinance of Secession from the United States on January 11, 1861, joining the Confederate States of America. Montgomery became the first capitol of the Confederacy, and it was the city in which Jefferson Davis gave his inaugural address. In May 1861, the capital was moved to Richmond, Virginia.

In November 1861, Governor John Gill Shorter appointed Judge Hopkins to oversee Alabama hospitals. The couple liquidated much of their real estate holdings in three states and contributed the cash to the medical needs of the Confederacy. Under authority given her by the Alabama legislature, Juliet coordinated civilian aid and donation efforts.

Operating out of a supply depot in Richmond, she converted three tobacco factories into hospitals during the four-month period of December 1861 through April 1862. The three facilities served an aggregate case load exceeding 500 patients and were daily overseen by on-site visits from Juliet. Her personalizing the effort included handling patient correspondence and supplying reading materials for the soldiers. When a patient died, Juliet personally sent a lock of their hair to their next of kin.

She additionally visited the areas of conflict to help tend the wounded, sustaining two hip wounds at the Battle of Seven Pines on May 31, 1862, that left her with a permanent limp. For this action she was nominated for, and later received over a century later, the Confederate Medal of Honor. During this time period, she was given the nickname "Florence Nightingale of the South". That same year, the Confederacy merged the patient load at the smaller hospitals into the larger facilities elsewhere. Wilson's Raid throughout Alabama sites in March and April 1865 forced the Hopkinses to flee the state and take refuge in Newman, Georgia.

== Death ==
After the war, the couple returned to Mobile, but had been financially depleted by the hostilities. Judge Hopkins died November 6, 1865, seven months after the conclusion of the American Civil War. He was buried in the Magnolia Cemetery, Mobile.

Juliet relocated to New York to live on property that had not been sold for the war effort, her remaining years spent in poverty. She died at her daughter's home in Washington, D.C. on March 9, 1890, aged 71. She was granted a full military burial at Arlington National Cemetery. Her pallbearers were members of the Alabama congressional delegation.

== Recognition ==
- Juliet Opie Hopkins was inducted into the Alabama Women's Hall of Fame in 1999.
