= Marietta National Cemetery =

Veterans cemetery in Cobb County, Georgia, United States

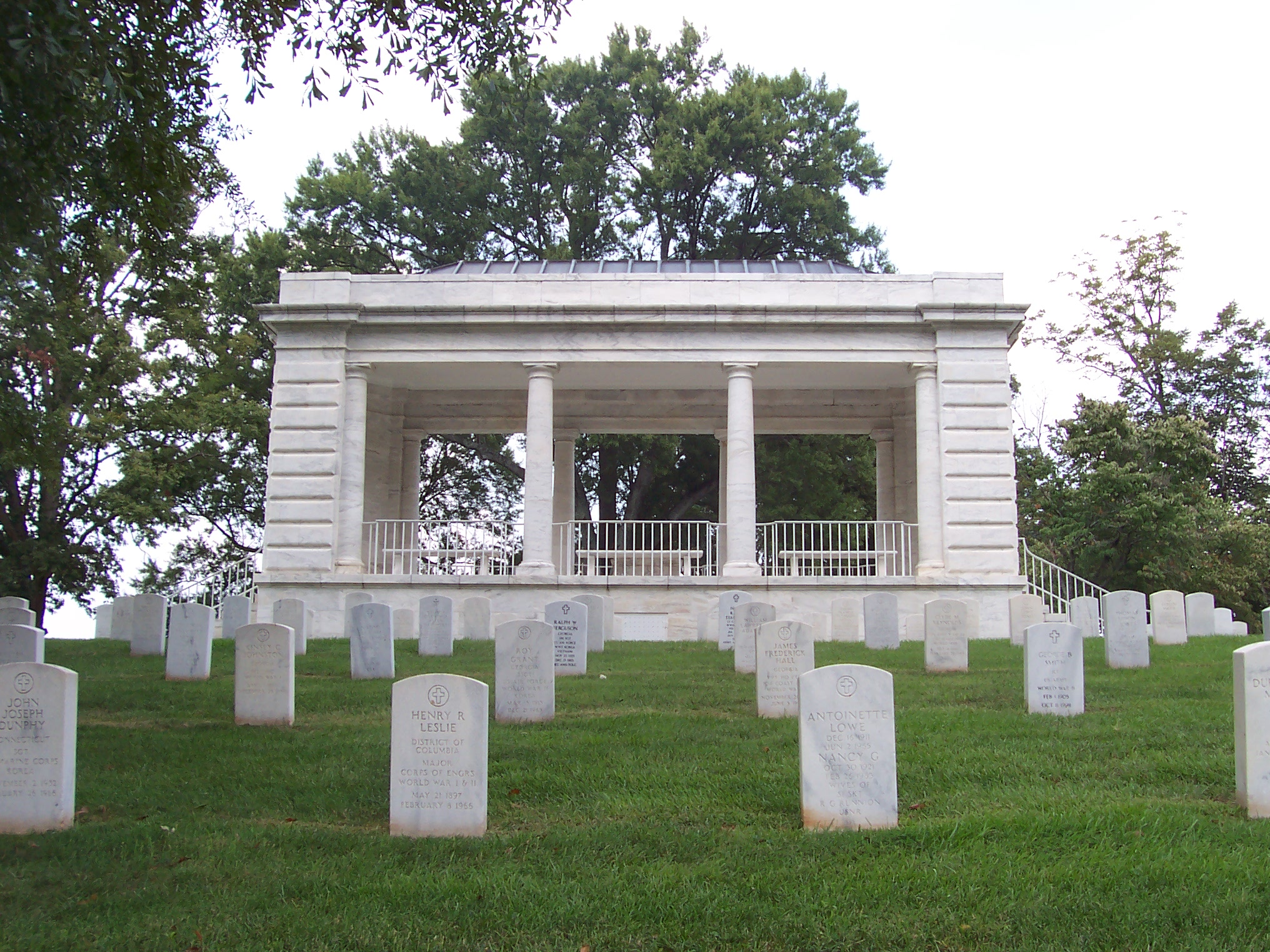
- Marietta National Cemetery
- Interactive map of Marietta National Cemetery

Details
- Established: 1866
- Location: Cobb County, Georgia
- Country: United States
- Coordinates: 33°57′04″N 84°32′28″W
- Type: United States National Cemetery (closed)
- Size: 23.3 acres (9.4 ha)
- No. of graves: ~20,000
- Website: Official
- Find a Grave: Marietta National Cemetery
- Marietta National Cemetery
- U.S. National Register of Historic Places
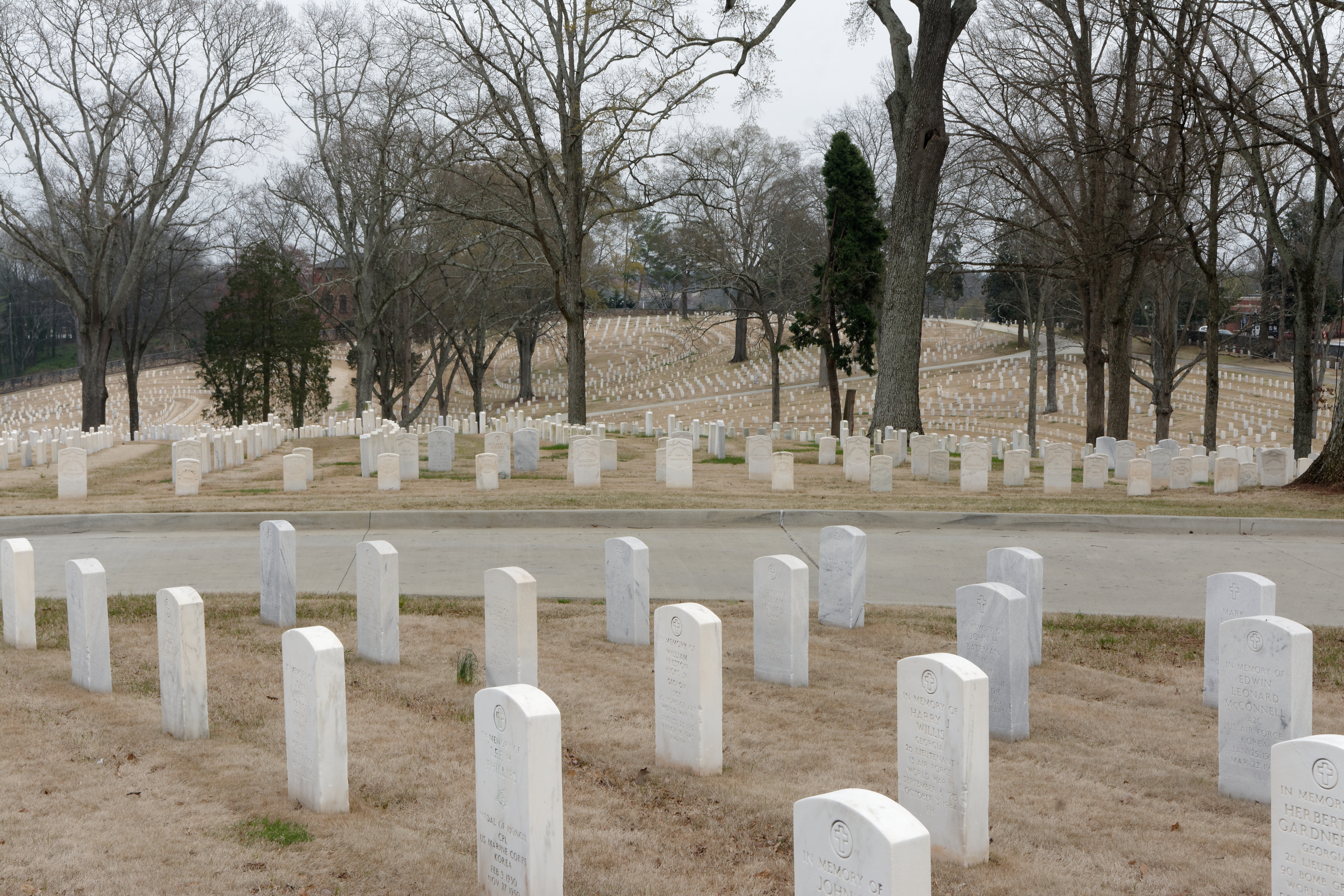
- Site in U.S. state of Georgia

- Location within Metro Atlanta Location within Georgia Location within the United States
- Location: 500 Washington Ave., Marietta, Georgia
- Area: 23.2 acres (9.4 ha)
- Built: 1866
- Architectural style: Colonial Revival
- MPS: Civil War Era National Cemeteries MPS
- NRHP reference No.: 98001170
- Added to NRHP: September 18, 1998

Marietta National Cemetery is a United States National Cemetery located in the city of Marietta in Cobb County, Georgia. It encompasses 23.3 acres (9.4 ha), and as of the end of 2006, had 18,742 interments. It is closed to new interments, and is now maintained by the new Georgia National Cemetery.

== History ==
Originally established in 1866 by General George Henry Thomas as Marietta and Atlanta National Cemetery, it was intended to provide interment for nearly 10,000 Union dead from General William Tecumseh Sherman’s Atlanta campaign.

The land for the cemetery was donated by local resident Henry Cole, as a place to inter both Union and Confederate soldiers. His idea was that by burying together those who had fallen together in battle, it could help foster a kind of peace. Both sides rejected his proposal, and the land was used primarily to inter Union soldiers, while the others were buried in the Marietta Confederate Cemetery. As part of the land sale agreement, the Cole family has their own plot within the National Cemetery.

Marietta National Cemetery was placed on the National Register of Historic Places on September 18, 1998.

== Notable monuments ==
- A marble obelisk dedicated in honor of 20th Army Corps was erected in May 1870.
- The Wisconsin Monument, dedicated in 1925 to 405 men from Wisconsin who died during the Civil War and were interred at the cemetery.
- The Gold Star Mothers Monument, dedicated on April 24, 1960.
- The Pearl Harbor Monument, erected on December 7, 1996.

== Notable interments and monuments ==
- Corporal Lee Hugh Phillips (1930–1950), for action in the Korean War (cenotaph)
- Private Denis Buckley (1844–1864), for capture of flag of the 31st Mississippi (CSA) in the Civil War
- The Silver Star is the third highest award that can be received by a member of the US Armed Forces. A total of 18 Silver Star recipients from World Wars I and II are buried at Marietta National Cemetery. Fifteen Silver Star recipients from the Korea and Vietnam conflicts are buried at Marietta National Cemetery; all were killed in action.
- John Clark (1766–1832), American Revolutionary War veteran, US Congressman, Georgia governor
- General W. A. Cunningham (1886–1968), US Army Colonel and University of Georgia Head Coach, Football
- Frank Simmons Leavitt, a.k.a. Man Mountain Dean (1891–1953), Master Sergeant in World War I and World War II, and professional wrestler
- Ella Lillian Wall Van Leer (1892–1986), Artist, architect, women's rights activist, and known as First Lady of Georgia Tech
- Emma Stephenson, Nurse at Union hospital in Civil War. Freed African-American Slave.
