= Miriam Greene Paslay =

American classicist

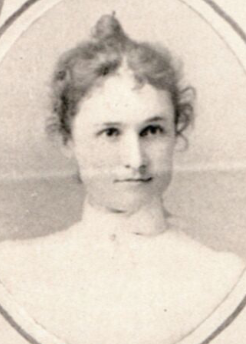
- Miriam Greene Paslay, from the 1904 yearbook of the Mississippi Industrial Institute & College
- Born: September 18, 1869; Como, Mississippi
- Died: April 24, 1932 (aged 62); New York City
- Occupations: College instructor, classicist
- Partner: Pauline Van de Graaf Orr

Miriam Greene Paslay (September 18, 1869 – April 24, 1932) was an American college professor. She was a professor of Latin and Greek at the Industrial Institute & College in Columbus, Mississippi from 1891 until 1920.

== Early life and education ==
Miriam "Minnie" Paslay was born in Como, Mississippi, the eldest child of Thomas Jefferson Paslay and Martha Jane Williamson Paslay. Both of her parents died while she was a student at the Industrial Institute & College (II&C) in Columbus. She completed her bachelor's degree in 1889, as a member of the school's first graduating class. She pursued further studies, mostly during summers and sabbaticals, in Europe and elsewhere in the United States, and earned her master's degree at Columbia University.

== Career ==
Beginning in 1891, Paslay taught Latin and Greek at II&C (later known as the Mississippi State College for Women). There were questions about her qualifications, as she was a recent graduate of the same school; several past teachers and colleagues wrote published letters in defense of Paslay's aptitude and training and added that she sought employment to contribute to the education of her orphaned younger sisters.

In 1914, after clashes with the school's president, Henry Lewis Whitfield, Paslay was not nominated to continue on the faculty as head of the classics department. Whitfield reversed this decision after she assured him in writing of her loyalty to him and to the school. She was one of the featured speakers at the Mississippi Federation of Women's Clubs annual convention in 1916. She spoke on the importance of higher education for women, saying: "Overestimating the practical and underestimating the cultural and abstract is simply emphasizing the body and leaving out of consideration the soul; and as true living requires a balanced care of body and soul, so the best education system carefully distributes and emphasizes between the practical and the ideal." In New York City after 1920, she taught at the Alcuin Preparatory School for Girls.

== Publications ==
- "Does the Style of the Civil War Justify the Doubt as to Its Authenticity?" (1918)

== Personal life ==
Paslay had a longterm personal relationship with fellow faculty member Pauline Van de Graaf Orr. They lived and traveled together in Mississippi and later in New York City, and took joint sabbatical study trips to Europe together in 1893 and 1905. In New York they shared their home with a third Mississippi woman, physician Mary Maxwell Hathorn. Paslay died from sepsis in 1932, at age 63, in New York City. The Mississippi State College for Women alumnae association held a memorial service for Paslay in May 1932. She and Orr share a gravestone at Mount Hope Cemetery in Hastings-on-Hudson, New York.
