= Bradley Observatory =

Observatory in Georgia, US

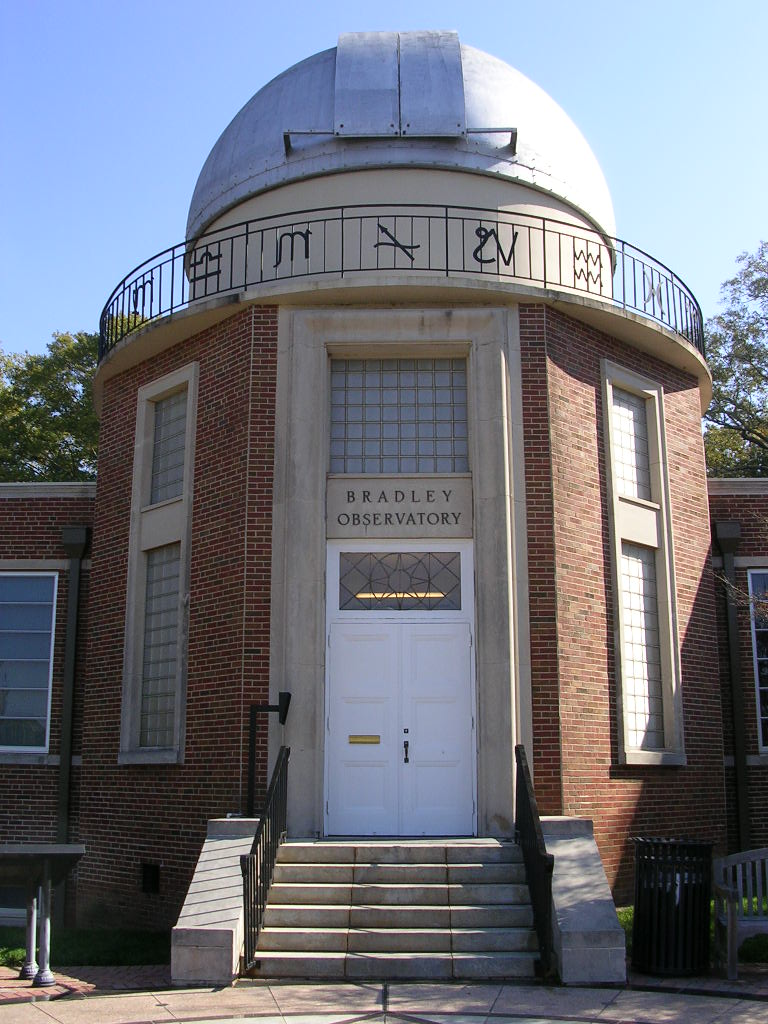
- Bradley Observatory entrance and dome.
- Organization: Agnes Scott College
- Location: Decatur, Georgia
- Coordinates: 33°45′54.84″N 84°17′38.98″W
- Altitude: 315.27 m (1034.37 ft)
- Established: 1950
- Website: bradley.agnesscott.edu

Telescopes
- Beck Telescope: 0.76 meter Cassegrain reflector optical
- Beck Radio Telescope (BrAT): 3.1 meter radio telescope with receivers at K, U and L bands
- Bradley Observatory
- U.S. Historic district – Contributing property
- Location within Metro Atlanta Location within Georgia Location within the United States
- Location: Roughly bounded by E. College, S. McDonough, S. Candler, E. Hill and E. Davis Sts., Decatur, Georgia
- Part of: South Candler Street-Agnes Scott College Historic District (ID94000787)
- Added to NRHP: July 29, 1994
- Related media on Commons

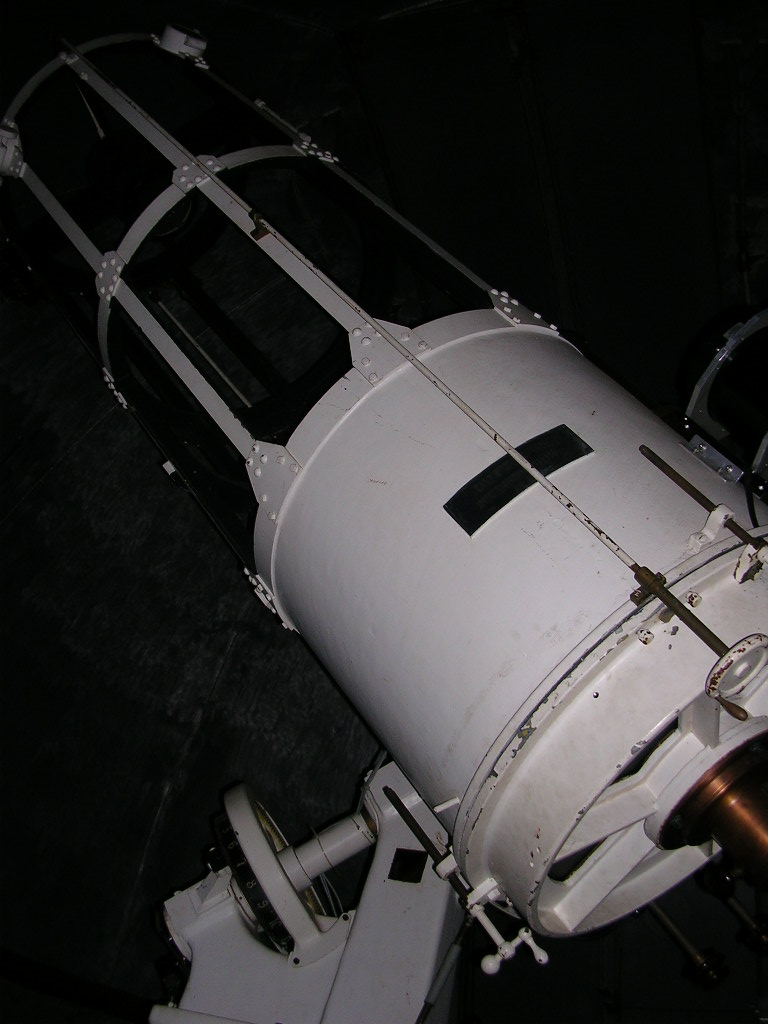
Beck Telescope

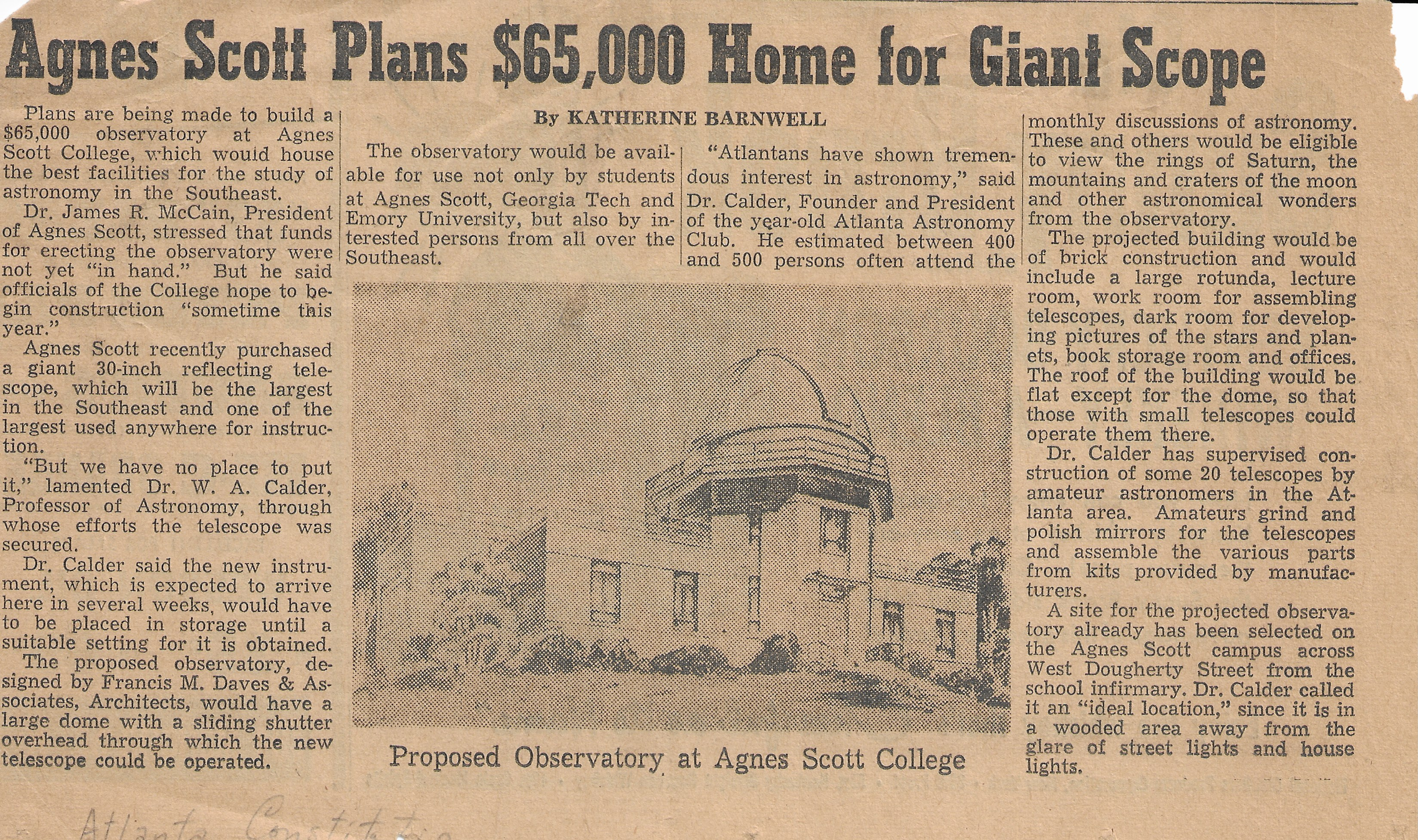
Atlanta Constitution article about the proposed new Observatory at Agnes Scott College.

The Bradley Observatory is an astronomical observatory owned and operated by Agnes Scott College. It is located in Decatur, Georgia, 5 miles (8.0 km) east of Atlanta, Georgia, (USA). The observatory's largest telescope, the Beck Telescope, is a vintage 30 inch (750 mm) Cassegrain reflector built in 1930. The mount was built by Warner & Swasey, and the optics were built by Fecker. The telescope was originally owned and operated by an amateur astronomer, Mr. Henry Gibson. He offered the telescope for sale in Popular Astronomy magazine in 1947, seeking to upgrade his own telescope. Agnes Scott purchased it in 1947 for about $15,000 after an offer from the Soviet Union was declined for reasons related to the Cold War. For many years, the Beck telescope was the largest in the Southeast United States, only superseded when the Fernbank Observatory opened in 1972 with its 36-inch (910 mm) telescope.

The observatory was originally built in order to house the Beck telescope and was dedicated in 1950. It also houses classrooms, an observing plaza, faculty offices, and a 70-seat planetarium. The observatory is a contributing structure within the National Register South Candler Street-Agnes Scott College Historic District. Dr. Chris DePree served as Director of Bradley Observatory from 1997-2021. The current observatory director is Dr. Alexandra Yep.

== See also ==
- List of observatories
