= Mary Maxwell Hathorn =

American physician

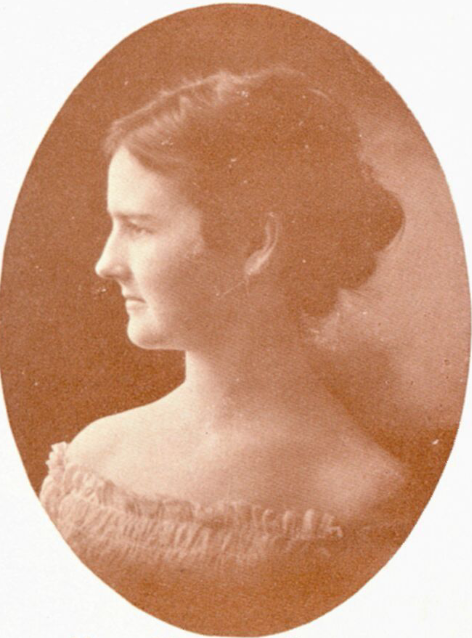
- Mary Maxwell Hathorn, from the 1905 yearbook of the Mississippi State College for Women
- Born: March 18, 1884; Columbia, Mississippi
- Died: November 13, 1935 (aged 51); New York City
- Other names: Maxie Hathorn, Mary M. Hathorne
- Occupation: Osteopathic physician

Mary Maxwell Hathorn (March 18, 1884 – November 13, 1935) was an American osteopathic physician.

== Early life and education ==
Hathorn was born in Columbia, Mississippi, the daughter of Nevin Clowney "Scott" Hathorn and Susan Rebecca Cooper Hathorn. She graduated from the Mississippi State College for Women (MSCW) in 1906, and trained as an osteopath at the American School of Osteopathy in Kirksville, Missouri, with further education at the College of Osteopathy in Chicago and at the University of Chicago.

== Career ==
Hathorn practiced osteopathy in Bonham, Texas and in Crowley, Louisiana, sometimes with her brother, John D. Hathorn, She wrote an advice column, "Health Hints", for the local newspaper in Crowley. From 1920 to 1935, she had both a private practice and a charity practice on West 74th Street in New York City. "She was almost a genius for diagnosis and was often called in consultation not only by her colleagues in osteopathy but by medical doctors as well," according to one obituary, which also noted that she could drive a car and change a tire "better than most professional chauffeurs."

== Personal life ==
Hathorn lived with two of her MSCW instructors, Pauline Van de Graaf Orr and Miriam Greene Paslay, in New York City. She also rented their apartment in Chicago in 1920, with another Mississippi woman, Mrs. Joseph Carson. Her niece Betty Hathorn Dreyer lived with the women while she was attending school in New York. Hathorn died in a New York hospital in 1935, at the age of 51, a few weeks after mastoid surgery.
