= 136th New York Infantry Regiment =

- Active: August 8, 1862 - June 13, 1865
- Country: United States
- Allegiance: Union
- Branch: Infantry
- Engagements: Battle of Chancellorsville; Battle of Gettysburg; Battle of Wauhatchie; Battle of Missionary Ridge; Atlanta campaign Battle of Resaca; Battle of Dallas; Battle of New Hope Church; Battle of Allatoona; Battle of Marietta; Battle of Kolb's Farm; Battle of Kennesaw Mountain; Battle of Marietta; Battle of Peachtree Creek; Siege of Atlanta; Sherman's March to the Sea; Carolinas campaign Battle of Bentonville

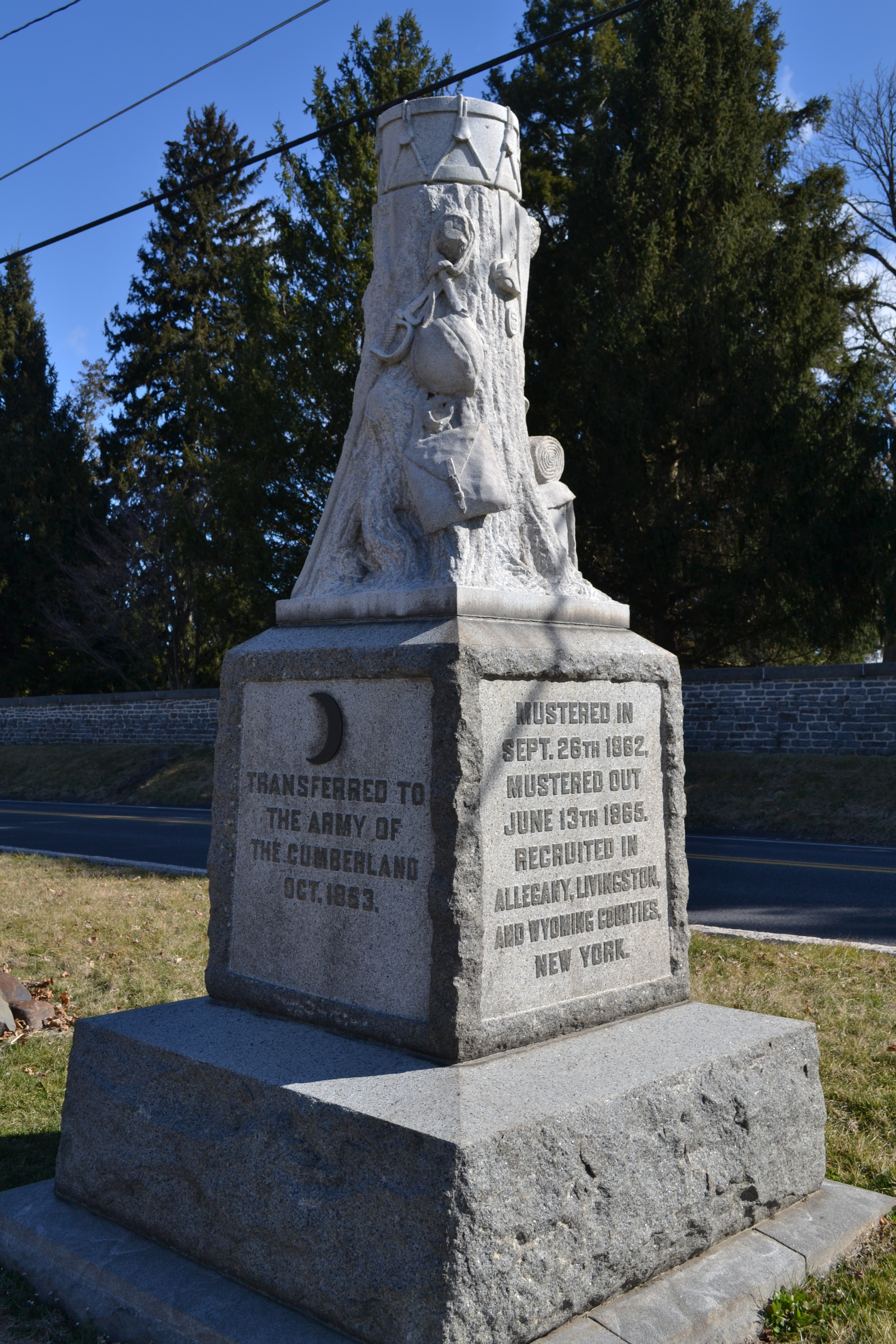
Monument to the 136th New York Volunteer Infantry at Gettysburg

The 136th New York Infantry Regiment (a.k.a. "Ironclads") was an infantry regiment in the Union Army during the American Civil War.

== Service ==
The 136th New York Infantry was organized at Portage, New York beginning August 8, 1862 and mustered in for three years service on September 25, 1862 under the command of Colonel James Wood Jr.

The regiment was attached to 1st Brigade, 3rd Division, XI Corps, Army of the Potomac, to November 1862. 2nd Brigade, 2nd Division, XI Corps, Army of the Potomac, to October 1863, and Army of the Cumberland to April 1864. 3rd Brigade, 3rd Division, XX Corps, Army of the Cumberland, to June 1865.

The 136th New York Infantry mustered out of service June 13, 1865. Recruits and veterans were transferred to the 60th New York Volunteer Infantry.

== Detailed service ==
Left New York for Washington, D.C., October 3, 1862. Moved to Fairfax Station, Va., October 10, 1862; then to Fairfax Court House, and duty there until November 1. Moved to Warrenton, then to Germantown, Va., November 1–20. Marched to Fredericksburg December 10–15. At Falmouth, Va., until April 27, 1863. "Mud March" January 20–24. Chancellorsville Campaign April 27-May 6. Battle of Chancellorsville May 1–5. Gettysburg Campaign June 11-July 24. Battle of Gettysburg July 1–3. Pursuit of Lee July 5–24. Camp at Bristoe Station August 1 to September 24. Moved to Bridgeport, Ala., September 24-October 3. Marched along the line of the Nashville & Chattanooga Railroad to Lookout Valley, Tenn., October 25–28. Reopening Tennessee River October 26–29. Battle of Wauhatchie, Tenn., October 28–29. Ringgold-Chattanooga Campaign November 23–27. Orchard Knob November 23. Tunnel Hill November 24–25. Missionary Ridge November 25. March to relief of Knoxville, Tenn., November 28-December 17. Duty in Lookout Valley until May, 1864. Atlanta Campaign May 1 to September 8. Demonstration on Rocky Faced Ridge May 8–11. Buzzard's Roost Gap May 8–9. Battle of Resaca May 14–15. Near Cassville May 19. Advance on Dallas May 22–25. New Hope Church May 25. Battles about Dallas, New Hope Church, and Allatoona Hills May 26-June 5. Operations about Marietta and against Kennesaw Mountain June 10-July 2. Pine Hill June 11–14. Lost Mountain June 15–17. Gilgal or Golgotha Church June 15. Muddy Creek June 17. Noyes' Creek June 19. Kolb's Farm June 22. Assault on Kenesaw June 27. Ruff's Station, Smyrna Camp Ground, July 4. Chattahoochie River July 6–17. Peachtree Creek July 11–20. Siege of Atlanta July 22-August 25. Operations at Chattahoochie River Bridge August 26-September 2. Occupation of Atlanta September 2-November 15. March to the sea November 15-December 10. Carolinas Campaign January to April 1865. Lawtonville, S.C., February 2. Skirmish of Goldsboro Road, near Fayetteville, N. C., March 14. Averysboro March 16. Battle of Bentonville March 19–21. Occupation of Goldsboro March 24. Advance on Raleigh April 9–13. Occupation of Raleigh April 14. Bennett's House April 26. Surrender of Johnston and his army. March to Washington, D.C., via Richmond, Va., April 29-May 30. Grand Review of the Armies May 24.

== Casualties ==
The regiment lost a total of 165 men during service; 2 officers and 71 enlisted men killed or mortally wounded, 1 officer and 91 enlisted men died of disease.

== Commanders ==
- Colonel James Wood Jr.
- Lieutenant Colonel Lester B. Faulkner

== Notable members ==
- Private Denis Buckley, Company G - Medal of Honor recipient for action at the Battle of Peachtree Creek

== See also ==
- List of New York Civil War regiments
- New York in the Civil War
