= Agnes Scott College =

Women's college in Decatur, Georgia, US

Coordinates: 33.77016°N 84.29325°W

- Former names: Decatur Female Seminary (1889–1890); Agnes Scott Institute (1890–1906)
- Motto: In Fide Vestra Virtutem In Virtute Autem Scientiam
- Motto in English: Add to your faith virtue and to your virtue knowledge
- Type: Private women's liberal arts college
- Established: 1889; 137 years ago
- Religious affiliation: Presbyterian
- Academic affiliations: APCU; Annapolis Group; Oberlin Group; CIC; WCC; Space-grant
- Endowment: $246.3 million (2025)
- President: Leocadia I. Zak
- Students: 1,124 (fall 2022)
- Undergraduates: 950 (fall 2022)
- Location: Decatur, Georgia, United States
- Campus: Suburban; total 91 acres (37 ha) Athletic complex 7 acres (2.8 ha) Bradley Observatory and Delafield Planetarium 1.5 acres (0.61 ha)
- Newspaper: Agnes Scott Profile
- Colors: Scottie Purple, yellow, gold, grey, black (official colors); Purple & white (athletic colors)
- Nickname: Scotties
- Sporting affiliations: NCAA Division III – Collegiate Conference of the South
- Mascot: Scottish Terrier
- Website: agnesscott.edu

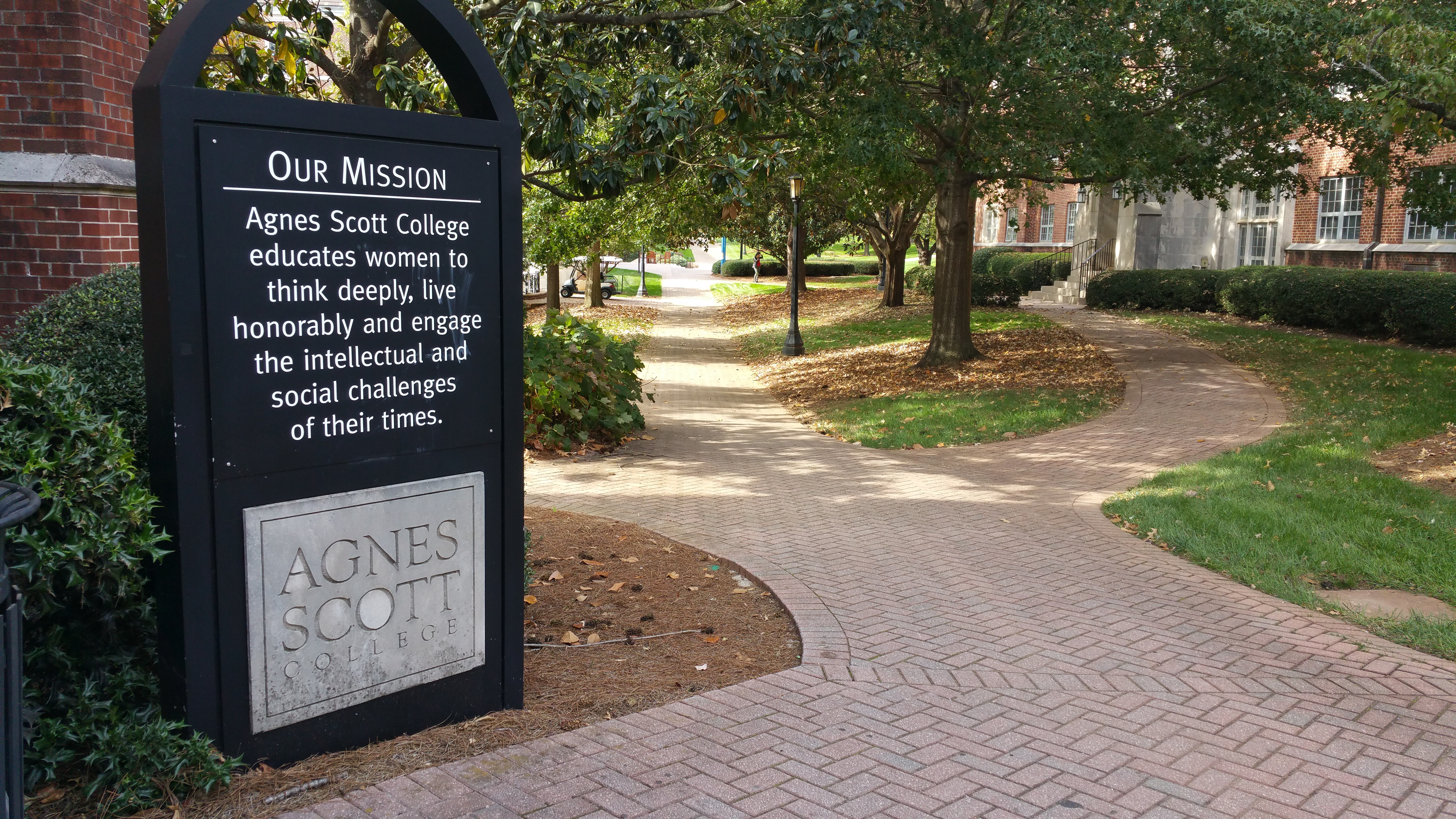
Agnes Scott College Mission Statement

Agnes Scott College is a private women's liberal arts college in Decatur, Georgia. The college enrolls approximately 1,000 undergraduate and graduate students. The college is affiliated with the Presbyterian Church and is considered one of the Seven Sisters of the South. It also offers co-educational graduate programs.

== History ==
The college was founded in 1889 as Decatur Female Seminary by Presbyterian minister Frank Henry Gaines. In 1890, the name was changed to Agnes Scott Institute to honor the mother of the college's primary benefactor, Col. George Washington Scott. The name was changed again to Agnes Scott College in 1906 and remains today a women's college.

Agnes Scott is considered the first higher education institution in the state of Georgia to receive regional accreditation. The ninth and current president since July 2018 is Leocadia I. Zak, who previously worked as director of the U.S. Trade and Development Agency (USTDA).

On July 27, 1994, the campus was listed on the National Register of Historic Places as part of the South Candler Street-Agnes Scott College Historic District. The historic district boundaries are East College Ave., South McDonough St., S. Candler St., East Hill St. and East Davis St. It includes the entire campus, as well as historic homes adjacent to the campus. The campus is also designated by the City of Decatur as a historic district.

The Reverend Frank Henry Gaines served as the first President of Agnes Scott, formally known as Decatur Female Seminary School, for 27 years (1896–1923). During his 27-year presidency, he ensured stability and success for the school, including the transition to the collegiate level, accreditation by the Southern Association of Colleges and Schools, acquisition of 20 acres of land and 21 buildings and an increase in assets from $5,000 to $1.5 million.

== Campus ==
Agnes Scott College is located within walking distance of downtown Decatur. It is served by Decatur station on the MARTA rail system, which is also a hub for buses, allowing students to travel to the greater Atlanta area.

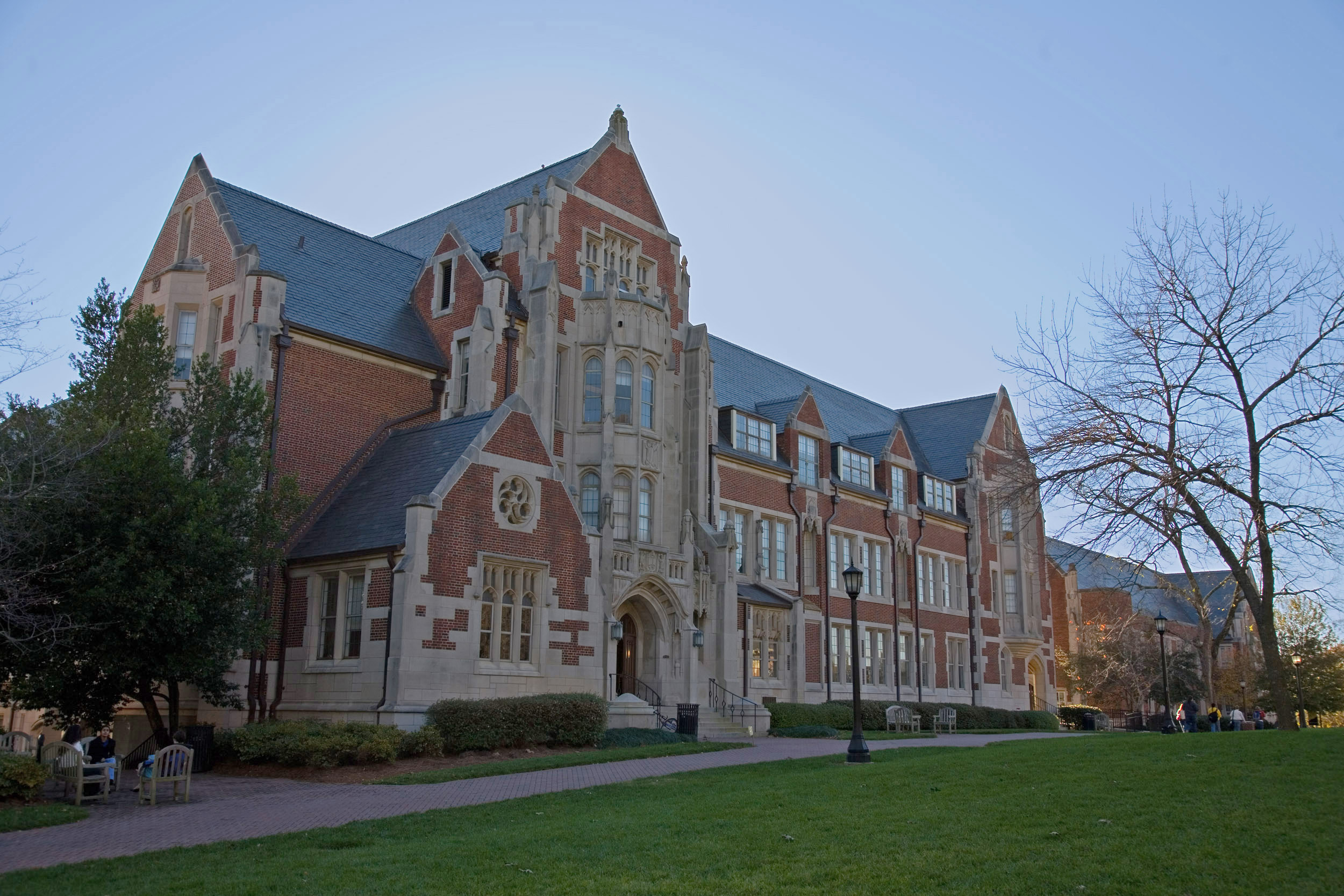
Buttrick Hall

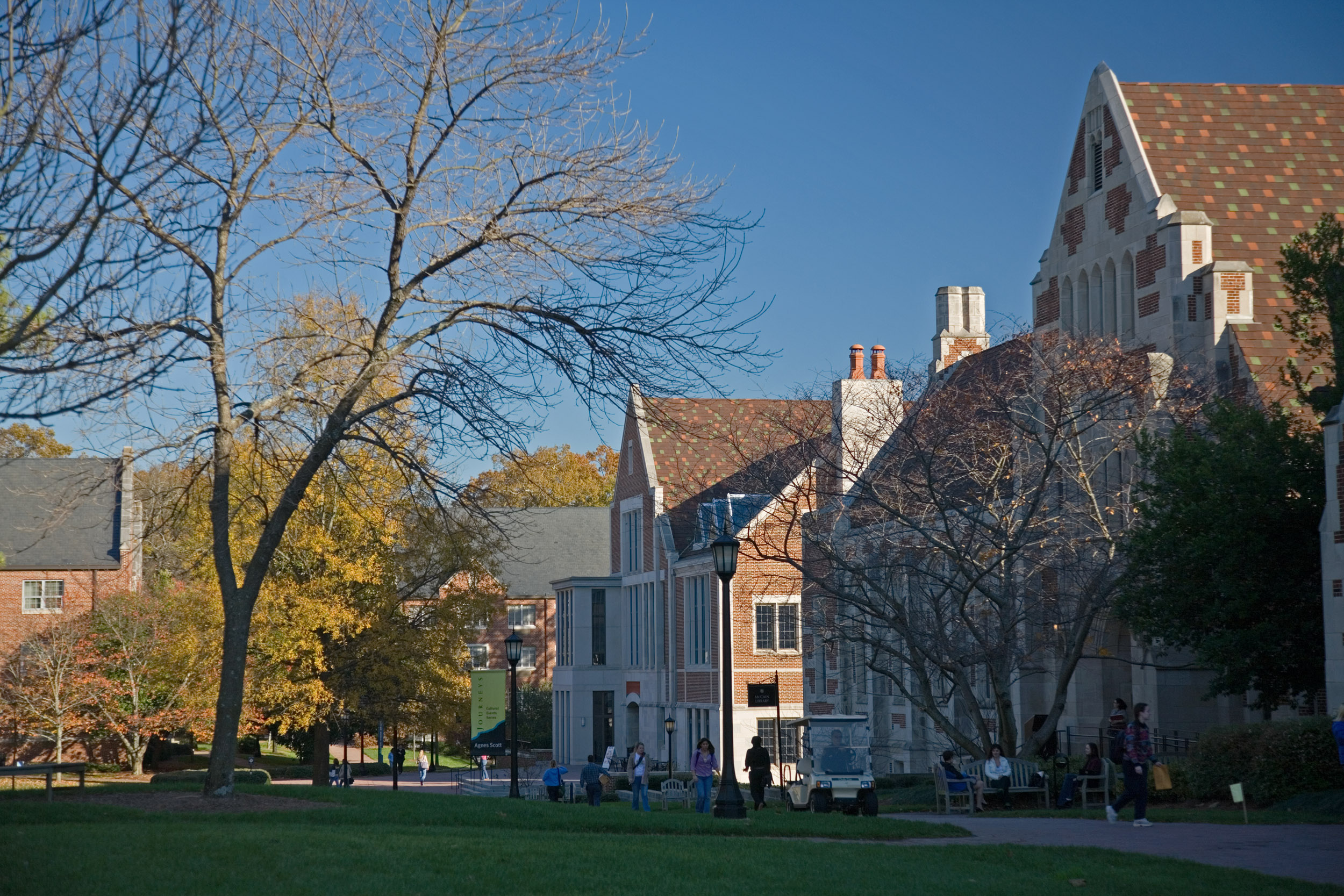
Looking across the quad

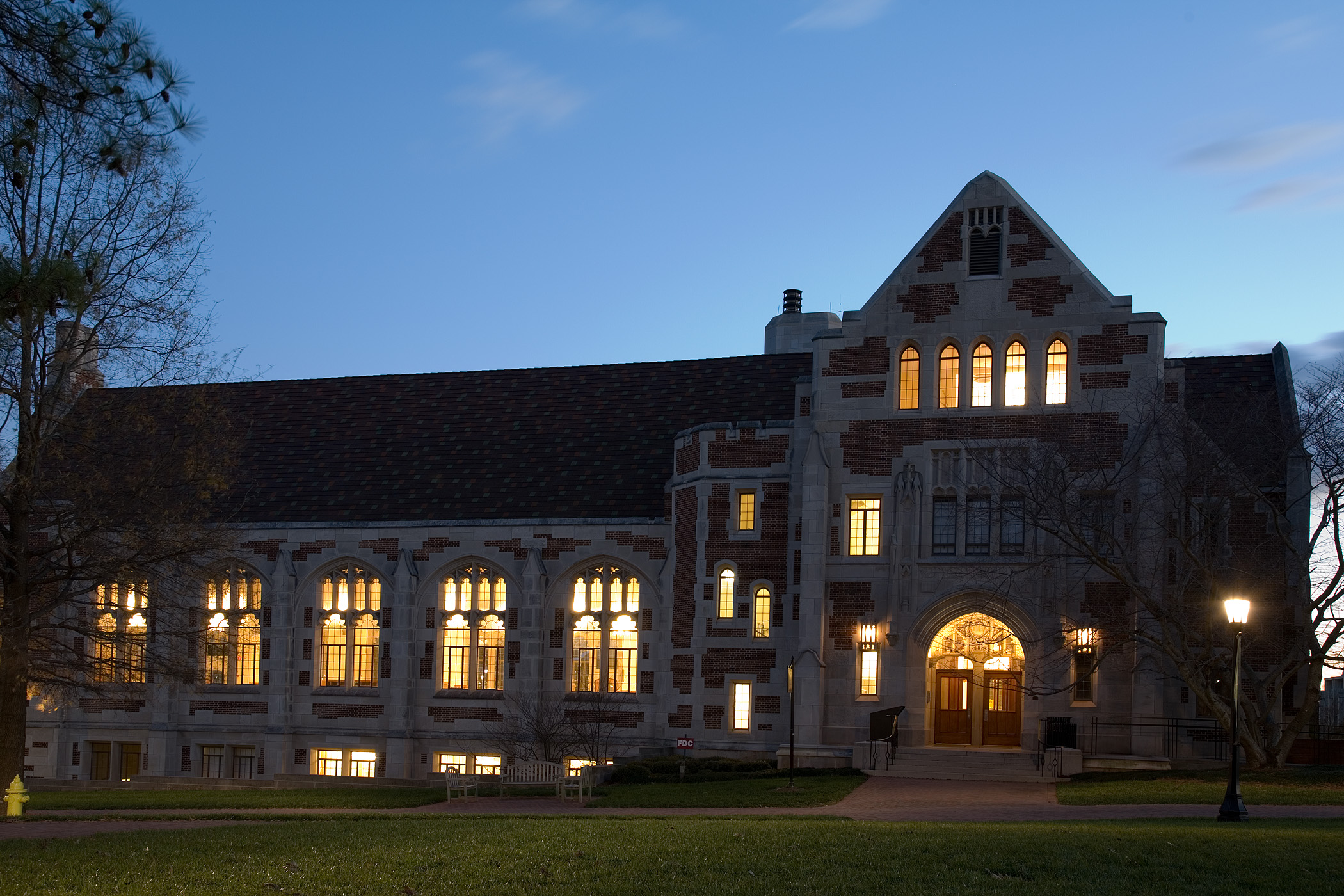
McCain Library at dusk

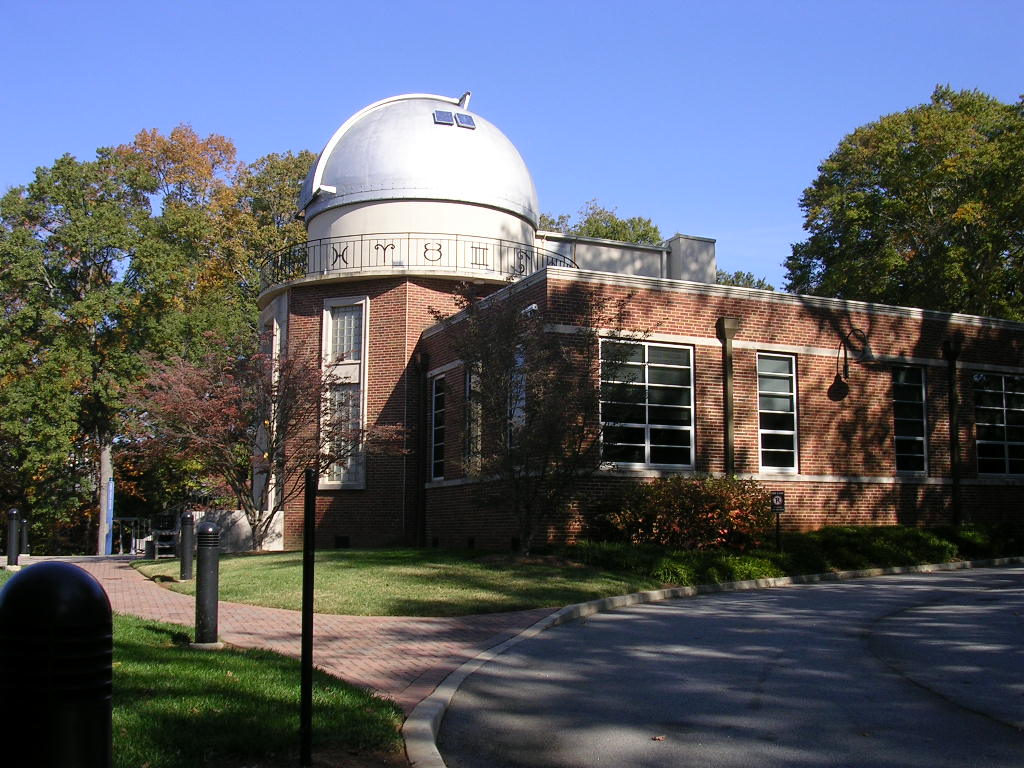
Bradley Observatory

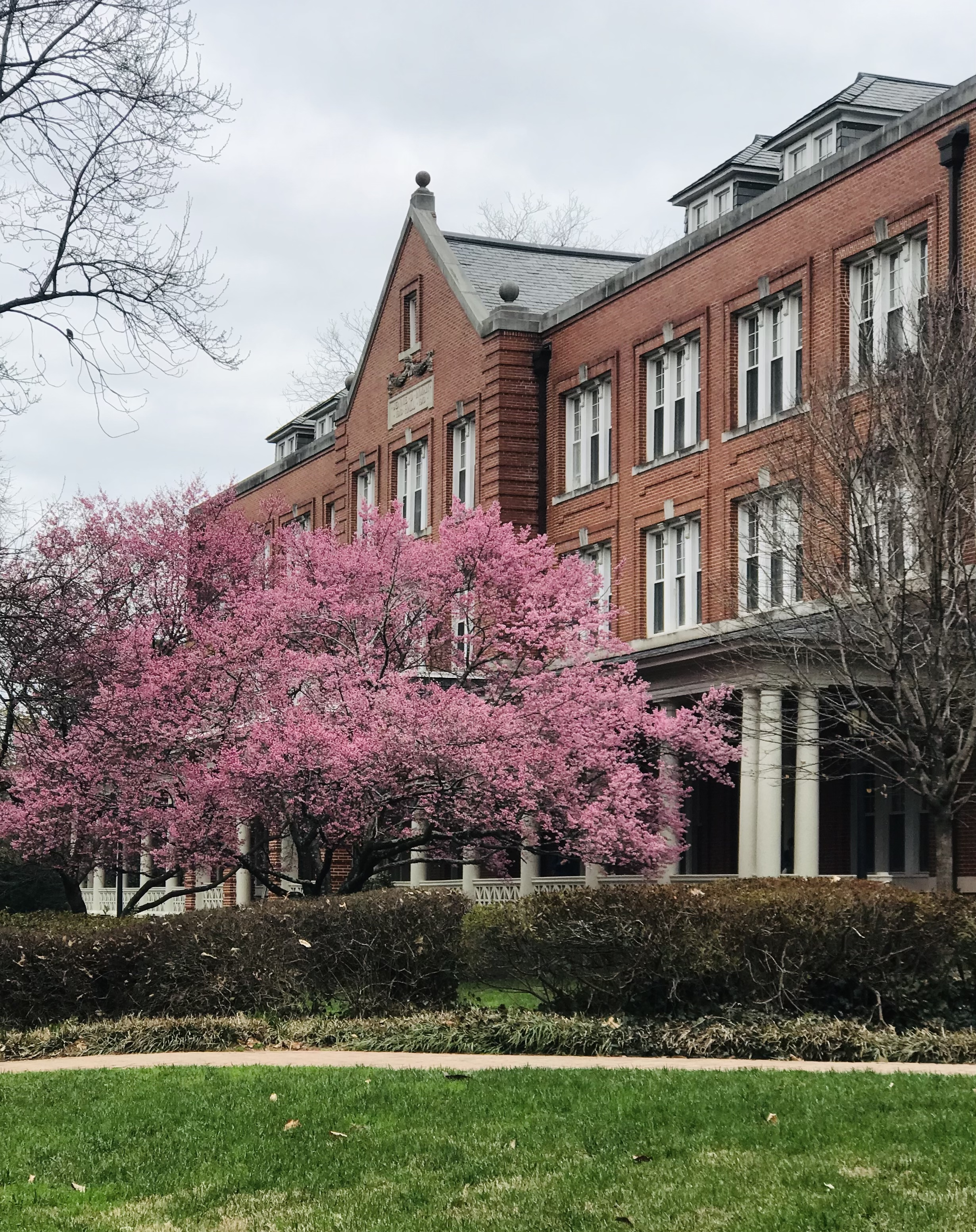
Inman Hall

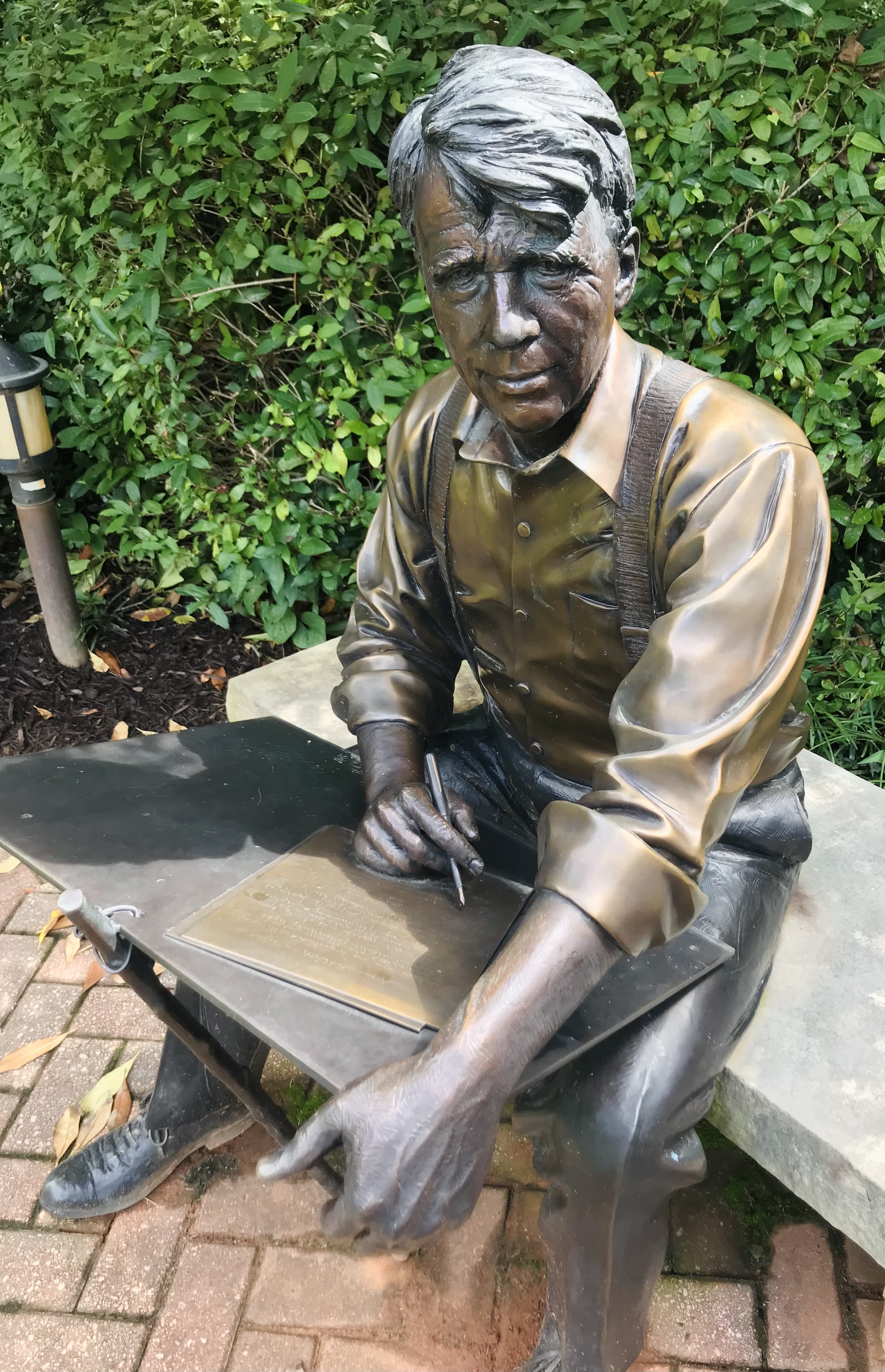
Alumnae Garden - Robert Frost statue

Agnes Scott occupies more than 90 acres (360,000 m^{2}) in Decatur. The college also owns the Avery Glen apartments as well as more than a dozen houses in the surrounding neighborhoods housing faculty, staff, and students. There are also six dedicated undergraduate dormitories located on campus.

American poet Robert Frost was first invited to speak at Agnes Scott in 1935, by English professor Emma May Laney, and he visited the college every winter from 1945 until his death in 1963. During his visits, he would read poetry in Presser Hall. A statue of the poet sculpted by George W. Lundeen sits in the alumnae gardens. A collection of Robert Frost's poetry and letters can be viewed on the second floor of the McCain Library.

=== Current Buildings ===
==== Agnes Scott (Main) Hall ====
Agnes Scott (Main) Hall, named after Agnes Irvine Scott, is located at the center of "the main loop" and is a one among many Agnes Scott buildings that was listed in the National Register of Historic Places. Main was built in 1891, making it the oldest building on campus. Main once housed the entire school. This is documented in the history of Agnes Scott by McNair titled Lest We Forget published in 1983. As technology became more advanced so did Main. Main Hall was the first building on campus and in the neighborhood to have electric lighting. Some say that people would gather outside of Main at night just to admire the light shining within the building.

==== Gazebo ====
Built in 1891, the Gazebo at Agnes Scott college has served a multitude of purposes throughout the years. It was originally located in front of Agnes Scott (Main) Hall, however in 1926 it was moved to the west end of Rebekah Scott Hall. The gazebo has been used as an office, meeting room, meditation chapel, and the Day Student Hut.

==== Rebekah Scott Hall ====
Built in 1906, Rebekah Scott Hall is the second oldest building remaining at Agnes Scott College. Rebekah Scott Hall cost $70,000 to build. It is named after George Washington Scott's wife, Rebekah Butcher Scott. The first floor of Rebekah Scott Hall contains offices, the office of financial aid, and the office of admissions. The second and third floors are used as student housing.

==== Jennie D. Inman Hall (Inman Hall) ====
Jennie D. Inman Hall, known commonly as Inman Hall, was built in 1911 and is the oldest building at Agnes Scott College which is used exclusively for student housing. In 1985, Inman had major renovations and the third floor was converted into study spaces for students. Jennie D. Inman Hall is 170 by 50 feet. It is made from Indiana limestone and is three stories high. The building faces west and has a large veranda which stretches along the front of the building. Jennie D, Inman Hall was gifted to Agnes Scott College by Samuel. M. Inman in memory of his wife, Jennie D. Inman.

==== Anna Young Alumnae House ====
Built in 1923, the Anna Young Alumnae House is dedicated to former science professor and Agnes Scott alumnae, Anna Irwin Young. Originally the Alumnae House was a central gathering place for ASC alumnae. The house and bedrooms are now used as a campus guest house. Behind the house is the Alumnae Garden which houses a statue honoring Robert Frost. The Anna Young Alumnae House underwent renovations from 2005 until 2009, after which it was re-opened.

==== Bradley Observatory ====
The Bradley Observatory at Agnes Scott houses the Beck Telescope, a 30-inch (760 mm) Cassegrain reflector, as well as a planetarium with 70-seat capacity and a radio telescope. Recently Agnes Scott College and the Georgia Tech Research Institute have collaborated on a project that added a LIDAR facility to the observatory.

==== Bullock Science Center ====
The college's science building, the Bullock Science Center, contains a three-story rendering of part of the nucleotide sequence from Agnes Scott's mitochondrial DNA. The DNA came from a blood sample of an ASC alumna who is a direct descendant of the college's namesake.

=== Sustainability ===
Agnes Scott has committed to becoming a carbon-neutral institute by the college's 150th anniversary in 2039 and has taken steps such as partnering with the Clean Air Campaign to reduce its impact on the local environment.

As of 2015, the college has five solar arrays, four of which are part of Georgia Power's Advanced Solar Initiative. The fifth array is on the rooftop of the Bradley Observatory and is also used for student research. The renovation of Campbell Hall into a mixed-use residence hall, learning center, and office space was concluded in 2014 and included installation of a hydro-geothermic HVAC system. The college also hosts a Zipcar.

== Academics ==
Agnes Scott offers 34 undergraduate majors and 9 graduate and post-baccalaureate programs. The undergraduate core curriculum SUMMIT focuses on leadership development, global learning, and digital literacy. In 2019, Agnes Scott received the Heiskell Award for Scholars as Drivers of Innovation for its SUMMIT curriculum.

SUMMIT at Agnes Scott is split into six areas of focus:

- The Four-Year experience
- Professional Success at Agnes Scott
- Board of Advisors
- Digital Literacy
- Global Learning
- Leadership Development

Undergraduate students are able to cross-register in other ARCHE member institutions. Its most popular undergraduate majors, based on 2021 graduates, were:

- Creative Writing (21)
- Psychology (18)
- International Relations and Affairs (16)
- Biology/Biological Sciences (14)
- Public Health (14)
- Multi-/Interdisciplinary Studies (12)

== Library ==
The library at Agnes Scott College was an original Carnegie library built in 1910. The building was demolished in 1986.

A new library was authorized by the board of trustees in 1935 and opened in the fall of 1936. This new library was called the "Carnegie Library" and the original library was turned into a student center. It was renamed in 1951 for James McCain, on the occasion of his retirement as the 2nd President of the college. In 1974-1977 and again in 1999–2000, the library underwent renovations.

== Student life ==
=== Diversity ===
Undergraduate demographics as of Fall 2023
Race and ethnicity	Total
White	40%
Black	31%
Hispanic	14%
Two or more races	6%
Asian	4%
International student	2%
Unknown	1%
Economic diversity
Low-income (Note: The percentage of students who received an income-based federal Pell grant intended for low-income students.)	40%
Affluent (Note: The percentage of students who are a part of the American middle class at the bare minimum.)	60%

As of fall 2025, the student body consists of over 900 undergraduate and graduate students. Approximately 60% of undergraduates that year were from Georgia.

=== Housing ===
Given Agnes Scott's emphasis on "mak[ing] lifelong friends, shar[ing] unforgettable experiences, discover[ing] meaningful places and find[ing] belonging in [their] community," a majority of students are encouraged to live on campus. Thus, most students are expected to live in on-campus housing for all four years as an undergraduate at Agnes Scott College. However, the proportion of commuter students has increased (from 15.6 to 18.0 percent between the 2014–2015 and 2019–2020 academic year) due to limited housing caused from an increase in the student population (from 849 to 986 total students) and renovations to the residence halls.

There are six resident halls situated around the Northern edge of the campus: Winship, Walters, Inman, Rebekah, Campbell, and Agnes Scott Hall (nicknamed "Main").

=== Student organizations ===
There are over 60 student organizations on campus. Sororities are prohibited.

=== Publications ===
The college hosts several student publications, including The Silhouette, the college's yearbook published annually, The Aurora, Agnes Scott's literary magazine, and The Profile, Agnes Scott newspaper. According to the college's website, "All students interested in writing, photography, editing, layout and design, cartoons, advertising and circulation are encouraged to join the staff."

=== Athletics ===
Agnes Scott is a member of the National Collegiate Athletic Association Division III which fields six sports teams including basketball, cross country, soccer, softball, tennis, and volleyball. All teams compete in the Collegiate Conference of the South (CCS).

== Rankings ==
Academic rankings

Liberal arts
- U.S. News & World Report: 63
- Washington Monthly: 47

National
- Forbes: 454

Agnes Scott was named as one of the Colleges That Change Lives (CTCL).

U.S. News & World Report's 2025 rankings include:

- No. 1 in Most Innovative Schools (National Liberal Arts Colleges)
- No. 3 First-Year Experience (National Liberal Arts Colleges)
- No. 3 in Best Undergraduate Teaching (National Liberal Arts Colleges)
- No. 6 in Study Abroad (National Liberal Arts Colleges)
- No. 6 (tie) in Learning Communities (National Liberal Arts Colleges)
- No. 14 (tie) in Co-ops/Internships (National Liberal Arts Colleges)
- No. 28 in Best Value Schools (National Liberal Arts Colleges)
- No. 63 (tie) among National Liberal Arts Colleges

Princeton Review's 2023 rankings include:

- The Best 388 Colleges
- No. 1 for Town-Gown Relations are Great (Private Schools)
- No. 3 for Best Schools Making an Impact (Private Schools)
- No. 5 for LGBTQ-Friendly (Private Schools)
- No. 6 for Best Alumni Network (Private Schools)
- No. 11 for Best Student Support and Counseling Services (Private Schools)
- No. 18 for Best Classroom Experience (Private Schools)
- No. 47 for Top Green Colleges

== Media production on campus ==
The campus has been a filming location for many productions, including the filming location for Windsor College in Scream 2, with its campus standing in for the fictional university where Sidney Prescott enrolls to escape her past. The college's Gothic architecture, particularly Agnes Scott (Main) Hall, provided the backdrop for many scenes, including the gazebo where a key reunion takes place. Complaints by students and alumni about disrespectful production crews and about sexist content in nonetheless rental-income-generating projects such as Road Trip: Beer Pong and Van Wilder: Freshman Year led to a new policy that requires school review of potential projects, responsibility training for crew members and extras, and at least one educational opportunity for students.
