= Pauline Van de Graaf Orr =

American educator

Pauline Van de Graaff Orr
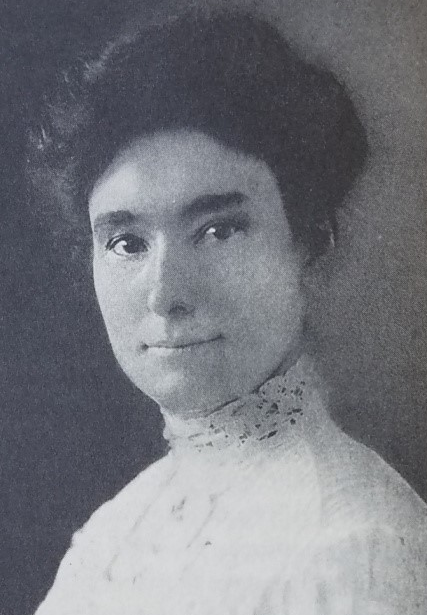
- Pauline Van de Graaff Orr, from a 1910 yearbook.
- Born: November 5, 1861; Chickasaw County, Mississippi, US
- Died: November 21, 1955 (aged 94); New York City, US
- Occupations: Educator, suffragist
- Partner: Miriam Greene Paslay

Pauline Van de Graaff Orr (November 5, 1861 – November 21, 1955) was an American educator and suffragist based in Mississippi.

== Early life and education ==
Orr was born in Chickasaw County, Mississippi, the daughter of Jehu Amaziah Orr and Cornelia Ewing Van de Graaf Orr. Her father was a federal judge and state legislator, and a Confederate States Army officer during the American Civil War. Her mother was from Alabama. Governor, senator, and Speaker of the House James Lawrence Orr was her uncle.

Orr attended a boys' school, because she wanted to learn Latin and mathematics. She pursued further education at Packer Collegiate Institute in New York, and studied German at the Diehl School for Oratory. Later in life, in 1912, she earned a master's degree from Columbia University.

== Career ==
From 1885, when the school opened, Orr was head of the English department at Mississippi's new Industrial Institute and College for the Education of White Women (now the Mississippi University for Women). She remained on the school's faculty for 28 years, until her resignation in 1913. One of her students was writer Blanche Colton Williams. Orr said of her career at the Institute, "I have desired, above everything else, the mental enfranchisement of the girls of Mississippi. I have tried to help them to realize and express themselves."

Orr was also a sought-after speaker off-campus. In 1891, she spoke on women's education to the Mississippi Teachers' Association. In 1915, she spoke on "Women's Clubs and Modern Industrial Life" at the Carnegie Library in Jackson, Mississippi.

After leaving academia, Orr was active in the Mississippi Woman Suffrage Association, and testified in favor of women's suffrage at a hearing in the Mississippi State House of Representatives in 1914. In 1915, she became president of the association, and in that capacity lectured across the state, attended suffrage meetings in other states, and organized local suffrage groups and events. She was also active in the Daughters of the American Revolution.

== Personal life and legacy ==
Orr had a long personal relationship with a fellow faculty member, classicist Miriam Greene Paslay. They lived together, and traveled together in Europe during joint sabbaticals in 1893 and 1905. The pair moved to New York City together in 1920, and shared a home with Orr's nephew and a former student. Paslay died in 1932, and Orr died in 1955, aged 89 years, in New York. In her eighties, she could still recite passages from Chaucer, and enjoyed visits with former students.

A building on the campus of the Mississippi University for Women was named in her honor in 1954. It currently houses the university's Center for Women's Research and Public Policy. Some of her letters are in the Jehu A. Orr Papers at the Southern Historical Collection, University of North Carolina, Chapel Hill.
