= The Catholic Miscellany =

First Catholic newspaper in the United States

- Categories: Roman Catholic, evangelization
- Frequency: Monthly
- Publisher: Most Rev. Jacques Fabre-Jeune, CS, Bishop of Charleston
- Total circulation: 65,000
- First issue: 1 June 2021
- Company: Roman Catholic Diocese of Charleston
- Country: United States of America
- Based in: Charleston, South Carolina, United States
- Language: English
- Website: https://themiscellany.org
- ISSN: 1053-6558

The Catholic Miscellany, successor to the U.S. Catholic Miscellany, the first Catholic newspaper in the United States, was the official newspaper of the Roman Catholic Diocese of Charleston. It was founded by Bishop John England, the first bishop of Charleston in 1822. He had been assigned to the area the previous year. The Catholic Miscellany magazine is the successor to the newspaper.

== U.S. Catholic Miscellany ==
Bishop England wrote in defense of his faith and about Irish immigrants since he had been assigned to the Diocese of Charleston in 1821. He had to buy advertisement space in either the Charleston Mercury or the Charleston Courier to answer nativist attacks. Nativism was a movement prominent in those days that sought to restrict political rights of foreign-born citizens.

Irish Catholics were a prime target in the South. The need England perceived for a Catholic communications forum in the New World prompted the activist prelate to start up the United States Catholic Miscellany on June 5, 1822. To market the premiere issue, England laid out a prospectus which was often repeated over the years and which was mailed to friends and potential investors: "Amongst the various wants of the Catholics of these states I do not know of a greater temporal (one) than a weekly paper, the principal scope of which will fair and simple statements of Catholic doctrine from authentic documents, plain and inoffensively exhibited, refutation of calumnies, examination and illustration of misrepresented facts of history, biographies of eminent ecclesiastics and others connected with the Church, reviews of books for and against Catholicity, events connected with religion in all parts of the world, etc."

The new Catholic paper was originally in a magazine format, 6×9 inches, that evolved into an eight-page tabloid-sized paper similar to the current one. No photographs were published in the U.S. Catholic Miscellany. The original circulation was 600 and peaked at 1,030; less than half of the subscribers actually paid the $4 annual subscription rate, according to an article published by the American Catholic Historical Society (the document housed in the diocesan archives bears no citation as to date or authorship). Finances were a continual problem for the newspaper.

Bishop England wrote most of the articles, signing them either "+John, Bishop of Charleston" or using a nom de plume such as "Curiosity" when the piece was not official church teaching. The bishop's work was editorialized throughout the paper. Some of his explanatory articles ran for as many as 20 installments. A public confrontation over the policies of the Charleston Orphan House was published in the U.S. Catholic Miscellany in 1825, after Bishop England was denied permission to catechize children residing in Charleston's Orphan House. England expressed concern that the rotational policies of the Orphan House violated orphan's religious rights and used the paper to ask, “What would you think of a proposal on my part requiring you to give up the religious instruction of the children of Protestants to Roman Catholics?" The manager of the Orphan House's response was also published in the paper. Unmoved by the Orphan House's response, England later raised funds to establish Charleston's first Catholic orphanage in 1841.

Towards the end of England's episcopate, editors and writers had assumed many of the writing duties. When the bishop died in 1842, The Miscellany reported under the headline "Death of the Bishop": "Our beloved Bishop is no more! After a long and distressing illness, he expired last Monday morning at ten minutes past 5 o'clock, in the 56th year of his age, and 22nd of his Episcopate.

"We cannot give expression to the feelings of our heart, overwhelmed with grief at this irreparable calamity." By then there were 1,500,000 Catholics in the nation and other Catholic publications had started. Bishop Ignatius A. Reynolds continued the United States Catholic Miscellany as a regional newspaper when he was appointed bishop of the Diocese of Charleston in 1844.

His editor was Father Patrick N. Lynch, who was destined to succeed him as bishop in 1858. Soon after Lynch was installed, South Carolina seceded from the Union in 1860 and The Miscellany changed its name to reflect its secessionist viewpoint. The banner of the December 29 edition appeared as Catholic Miscellany. Starting with the first issue of 1861, the paper was called Charleston Catholic Miscellany.

The American Catholic Historical Society credited the title change to the paper's smaller range, noting that Georgia had become its own diocese in 1850, but the editor, Father James Corcoran, wrote that he could no longer tolerate "those two obnoxious words (i.e.: United States), which being henceforth without truth of meaning would ill become the title of the paper."

On December 11, 1861, a fire swept across the peninsula of Charleston, destroying the Cathedral of Saint John and Saint Finbar, the editorial offices of the paper and its press, along with many other buildings. The Miscellany ceased publication.

Following the Civil War, Lynch tried to revive the Catholic paper, but funds to support it were not available in postwar South Carolina.

== Revival ==
Ninety years after The Miscellany was discontinued, The Catholic Banner began publishing in 1951. The Banner was a section of Our Sunday Visitor, a nationally distributed Catholic weekly newspaper. In 1960, The Banner became part of a three-diocese consortium, designed and published in Waynesboro, Georgia, with some local articles and photographs accompanying national and international copy from a wire service, the Catholic News Service. The editorial offices of The Banner were located in Columbia, South Carolina.

In 1990, Bishop David B. Thompson returned the diocesan newspaper to its historic roots, renaming it The New Catholic Miscellany and moving the editorial offices to Charleston.

In March 1995, The Miscellany staff began producing the paper in-house and printing it locally. That same year, the paper won its first national award for excellence. Thompson was presented with the Bishop John England Award by the Catholic Press Association, a group of hundreds of magazines, newspapers and newsletters. Named after the founder of the Catholic press in America and Thompson's predecessor, the award is "for outstanding performance as a publisher". It was presented exactly two weeks before the 175th anniversary of paper. In 2002, the word New was dropped from the nameplate and the paper became The Catholic Miscellany.

The newspaper was discontinued in June 2021 in favor of a magazine, produced by The Miscellany staff and designed and printed by Faith Catholic. The Catholic Miscellany magazine is a 32-page, full color publication mailed monthly to approximately 65,000 households across the state of South Carolina.
