= Henry P. Northrop =

American Catholic bishop

The Right Reverend Henry P. Northrop
- Bishop of Charleston
- Church: Catholic Church
- Diocese: Charleston
- Appointed: January 27, 1883
- Term ended: June 7, 1916
- Predecessor: Patrick Neeson Lynch
- Successor: William Thomas Russell
- Previous post: Vicar Apostolic of North Carolina (1881–1888)

Orders
- Ordination: June 25, 1865 by Pietro de Villanova Castellacci
- Consecration: January 8, 1882 by James Gibbons

Personal details
- Born: May 5, 1842 Charleston, South Carolina, U.S.
- Died: June 7, 1916 (aged 74) Charleston, South Carolina, U.S.

Henry Pinckney Northrop (May 5, 1842 – June 7, 1916) was an American Catholic prelate who served as Bishop of Charleston from 1883 until his death in 1916. He previously served as Vicar Apostolic of North Carolina from 1881 to 1888.

== Early life ==
=== Birth and family background ===
Henry Pinckney Northrop was born on May 5, 1842, in Charleston, South Carolina. His father, Claudian Bird Northrop, was a lawyer and brother of Lucius B. Northrop, who served as Commissary-General of the Confederate States of America during the Civil War. His mother, Hannah Eliza Northrop (née Anderson), was born in Scotland and died during childbirth in 1853. Henry was the third of their seven children; one brother, Lucius C. Northrop, later served as U.S. Attorney for South Carolina (1878–1881). After his mother's death, his father remarried and had two more children; one half-brother, George P. Northrop, became a prominent chess journalist.

The Northrop family were converts to Catholicism who had previously attended St. Philip's Episcopal Church in Charleston. Henry was received into the Catholic Church on August 15, 1849. His father was also a slaveowner who at one point owned 24 enslaved people. In 1861, his father moved the family to Lancaster County, where he opened a law office and managed a plantation owned by Bishop Patrick Neeson Lynch. During the war, Henry's brother John served in the Confederate States Army and was blinded during the Battle of Gaines' Mill. Amid the Carolinas campaign, his father was found dead in February 1865. According to J. Marion Sims, he was hanged by bummers; according to Father Jeremiah O'Connell, uncle of Bishop Denis J. O'Connell, he died from apoplexy.

=== Education ===
In 1853, Northrop entered Georgetown College in Washington, D.C. He remained there for three years, but poor health led him to enroll at Mount St. Mary's College in Emmitsburg, Maryland. He completed his undergraduate studies in 1860 and then entered the seminary at the same institution, residing there during most of the Civil War.

In 1864, Northrop went to Rome to study at the Pontificio Collegio Urbano de Propaganda Fide while residing at the Pontifical North American College, where his brother Claudian was also studying. At the time, the rector of the college was Father William McCloskey, the future Bishop of Louisville (1868–1909).

== Priesthood ==
On June 25, 1865, Northrop was ordained a priest by Archbishop Pietro de Villanova Castellacci, the vicegerent of the Diocese of Rome. He returned to the United States that summer. However, unable to return to South Carolina before the conclusion of the war, he served for a few months as an assistant to Father George McCloskey, brother of the American College's rector, at the Church of the Nativity in New York City.

Northrop finally returned to Charleston with Bishop Lynch in December 1865. He then served as an assistant pastor at St. Joseph Church for a year, except for four months in 1866 when he was assigned to St. Thomas Church in Wilmington, North Carolina, to temporarily replace Father James Andrew Corcoran while the latter was attending the Second Plenary Council of Baltimore. He celebrated his father's long-delayed Requiem Mass in February 1867.

In June 1867, Northrop was placed in charge of St. Paul Church in New Bern, North Carolina, and the accompanying mission that covered nearly half of the state. In this territory, there were two other churches at Raleigh and Edenton and approximately 250 Catholics. When the Vicariate Apostolic of North Carolina was created in 1868, Northrop was loaned by Bishop Lynch to the new vicar apostolic, Bishop James Gibbons, and continued at New Bern. In 1872, he was recalled to Charleston and served as an assistant at the pro-cathedral for six years. During this time, he also oversaw the completion and dedication of Stella Maris Church on Sullivan's Island. In 1877, when Father John Moore became Bishop of St. Augustine, Northrop succeeded him as pastor of St. Patrick Church in Charleston. That same year, Northrop was considered for the post of Bishop of Richmond but John J. Keane was ultimately chosen instead.

== Episcopal career ==
=== Vicar Apostolic of North Carolina ===
In August 1878, the bishops of the ecclesiastical province of Baltimore submitted to Rome a terna, or list of three candidates, for Vicar Apostolic of North Carolina that included Fathers Northrop, Francis Janssens, and Mark Gross. It took until February 1880 for Gross to be appointed, but he refused to accept. A new terna was submitted in May 1881, and Northrop was appointed by Pope Leo XIII on September 16 of that year. He was also given the honorary position of titular bishop of Rosalia.

Northrop received his episcopal consecration on January 8, 1882, from James Gibbons (then Archbishop of Baltimore) at the Baltimore Cathedral, with Bishops Keane and Thomas Becker serving as co-consecrators. He remained as Vicar Apostolic until 1888, when Abbot Leo Haid was appointed to succeed him. During Northrop's tenure, he established six new churches and chapels in North Carolina while the state's Catholic population grew from 1,800 to 2,500.

=== Bishop of Charleston ===
In addition to his duties in North Carolina, Northrop was appointed the fourth Bishop of Charleston by Leo XIII on January 27, 1883. He served until his death in 1916, and his 33-year tenure remains the longest in the history of the diocese.

At the beginning of Northrop's tenure, the diocese contained 20 priests, 18 churches, six chapels, three academies, and four parochial schools. By the time of his death, there were 24 priests, 33 churches, 75 stations, eight chapels, five academies, and eight parochial schools to serve 9,300 Catholics. He also oversaw the construction of the Cathedral of St. John the Baptist, which began in 1890, and dedicated it in 1907.

==== St. Peter Church ====
In April 1888, Northrop prohibited white Catholics in Charleston from attending St. Peter Church, which had been established by Bishop Lynch in 1867 to serve the city's Black Catholics. Many white Catholics had been attending the church because it did not require a pew tax or rent. James A. Spencer, one of St. Peter's trustees, wrote to Northrop to clarify whether Black Catholics could attend other churches in the city. In July of that year, Northrop again forbid integrated parishes, but the pastor of St. Peter's refused to read his letter from the pulpit.

In 1902, Northrop opened a new and larger parochial school for St. Peter's. He also established a new convent for the Sisters of Charity of Our Lady of Mercy, who staffed the school.

== Death ==
Northrop died at St. Francis Xavier Hospital in Charleston on June 7, 1916, at the age of 74. His Requiem Mass was celebrated on the following June 13 by Cardinal Gibbons (who had consecrated him a bishop), with Bishop Denis J. O'Connell delivering the eulogy. He is buried in the crypt of the Cathedral of St. John the Baptist.

Catholic Church titles
Preceded by James Gibbons	Vicar Apostolic of North Carolina; 1882—1888	Succeeded by Leo Michael Haid
Preceded by Patrick Neeson Lynch	Bishop of Charleston; 1883—1916	Succeeded by William Thomas Russell
