= Patrick Neeson Lynch =

Catholic bishop

The Right Reverend Patrick Neeson Lynch
- Bishop of Charleston
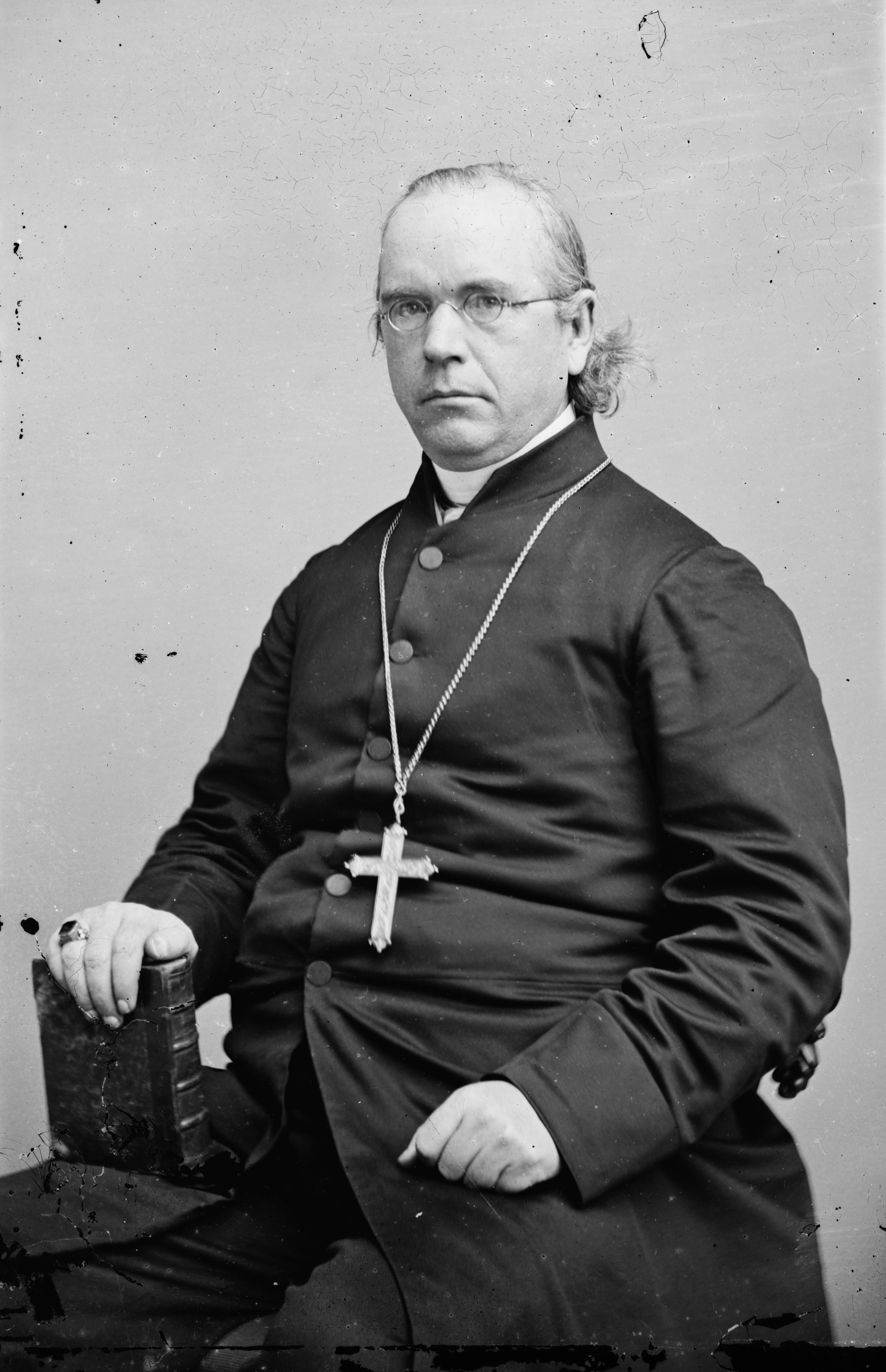
- Lynch, c. 1860
- Church: Catholic Church
- Diocese: Charleston
- Appointed: December 11, 1857
- Term ended: February 26, 1882
- Predecessor: Ignatius A. Reynolds
- Successor: Henry P. Northrop

Orders
- Ordination: April 5, 1840 by Giacomo Filippo Fransoni
- Consecration: March 14, 1858 by Francis Kenrick

Personal details
- Born: March 10, 1817 Clones, County Monaghan, Ireland
- Died: February 26, 1882 (aged 64) Charleston, South Carolina, U.S.

Patrick Neeson (Note: While some sources spell his middle name as Neeson, others spell it as Nieson.) Lynch (March 10, 1817 – February 26, 1882) was an American Catholic prelate who served as the third Bishop of Charleston from 1858 until his death in 1882. During the American Civil War, he supported the Confederate States of America and served as a Confederate emissary to the Holy See.

== Early life ==
=== Birth and family background ===
A native of Ireland, Patrick Lynch was born on March 10, 1817, in Clones, County Monaghan. He was the second of twelve children of Conway Peter Lynch and Eleanor McMahon (née Neeson) Lynch. His maternal grandfather had disapproved of his parents' marriage and disinherited his mother. This was possibly due to the fact that Eleanor had been pregnant at the time of her marriage, giving birth to a daughter three days later.

In 1819, the Lynch family immigrated to the United States. They first came to Georgetown, South Carolina, and then, upon the recommendation of state senator (and future governor) John Lyde Wilson, they made their home in the town of Cheraw on the Pee Dee River. Among the Lynch children born in South Carolina were a daughter, Ellen Lynch (who became an Ursuline nun known as Mother Mary Baptista Aloysius), and a son, Francis de Sales Lynch (the grandfather of Patrick N. L. Bellinger, who was named after the bishop).

Conway Lynch worked as a carpenter and millwright in Cheraw, where he helped build the local Catholic church. Many members of the Lynch family owned enslaved people. According to historians David Heisser and Stephen White:

According to census records, the Bishop's father, Conlaw Lynch, had two slaves in 1830 and seven from 1840 to 1860. Dr. John Lynch, the Bishop's brother, owned three slaves in 1850 and twenty-eight in 1860. The third son, Francis Lynch, a Cheraw storekeeper and manufacturer of leather footwear, had ten slaves in 1850 and twenty-two in 1860 and purchased at least a dozen more during the war. Two of Bishop Lynch's sisters married slaveowners.

As a bishop, Patrick Lynch himself owned enslaved people. This was reported as early as 1861 by The New York Times, which claimed Lynch "owned some five hundred slaves." Heisser also writes:

Prior to secession [Lynch] had paid taxes on ten slaves in Charleston. In 1861, before the outbreak of war, he purchased about 85 people through Thomas Ryan from the estate of William McKenna, a wealthy Catholic layman...The bishop put the McKenna Negroes to work on plantations and at other sites around South Carolina; one of them worked for the Ursulines in Columbia.

In 1862 Lynch further acquired a woman and her two children from one of his debtors in Lancaster as surety for payment of a loan to another Irish native. On its repayment in 1864, the three slaves were returned to him. In 1863 Lynch purchased a woman named Flora in Charleston, but his motive for doing so is unknown. On two occasions during the war he also sold on troublesome slaves, but with their families, so as to keep these intact.

=== Education ===
Lynch attended Cheraw Academy until 1829, when he entered St. John the Baptist Seminary in Charleston. At the time, the school taught classical and philosophical subjects to boys aged seven years and older. In 1834, he and James Andrew Corcoran were sent by Bishop John England to study for the priesthood at the Pontificio Collegio Urbano de Propaganda Fide in Rome. There, Lynch delivered an address in Hebrew before Pope Gregory XVI and received the degree of Doctor of Divinity.

== Priesthood ==
On April 5, 1840, Lynch was ordained a priest by Cardinal Giacomo Filippo Fransoni, prefect of the Congregation for the Propagation of the Faith, in Rome. Upon his return to the United States, he served as an assistant at the Cathedral of St. John and St. Finbar (1840–1845), pastor of St. Mary of the Annunciation Church in Charleston (1845–1847), and rector of the seminary (1847–1851) and the cathedral (1847–1857). In addition to his pastoral duties, he was named editor of the United States Catholic Miscellany in 1844 and vicar general of the Diocese of Charleston in 1850.

While a priest, Lynch engaged in a public polemical debate with James Henley Thornwell, a Presbyterian minister and president of South Carolina College. After Thornwell published an anti-Catholic essay on the deuterocanonical books in 1843, Lynch published a series of responses in the Miscellany. The exchange, which lasted until 1844, was noted not only for the two men's theological disagreements but also for their personal attacks against each other.

== Bishop of Charleston ==
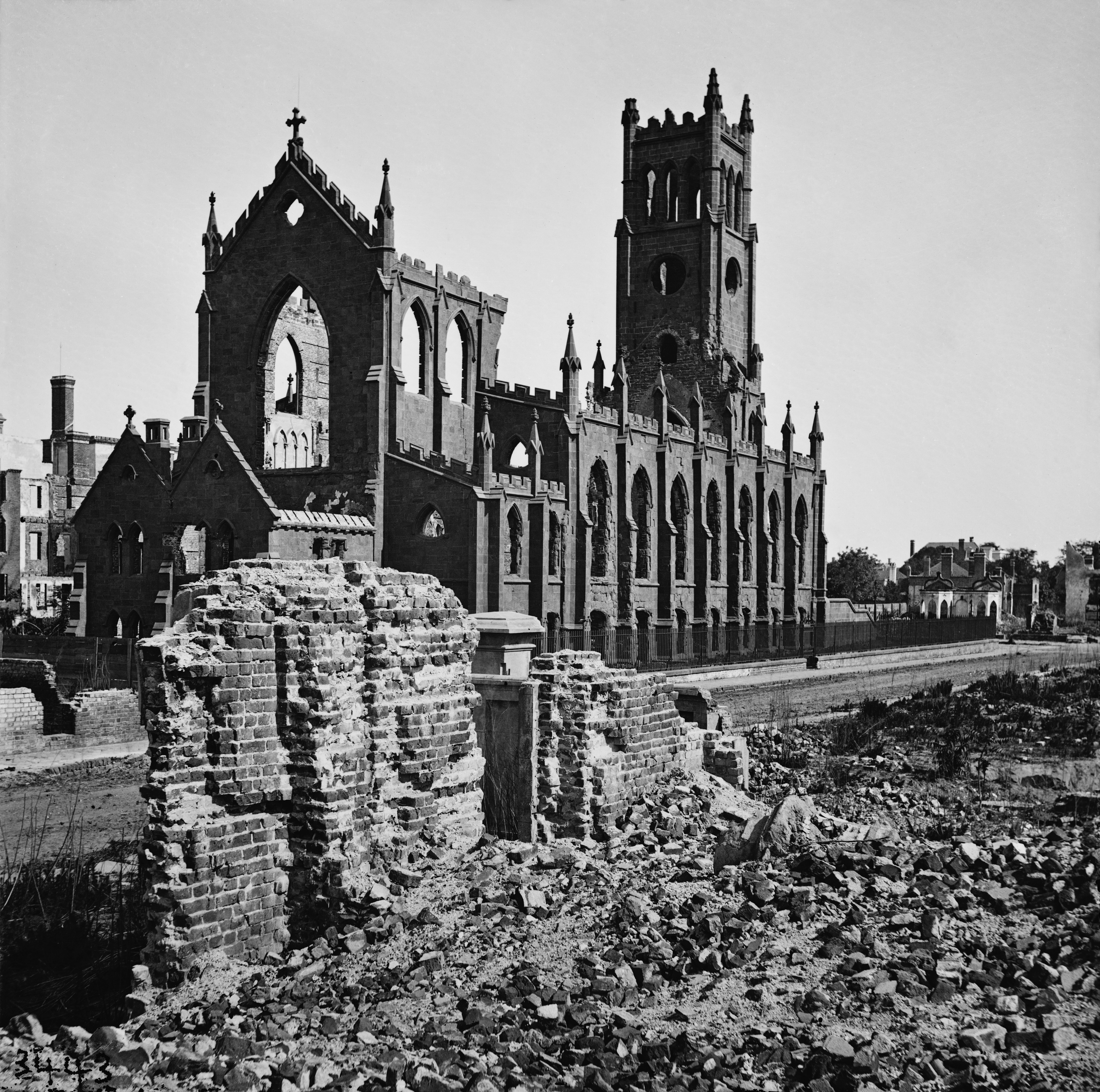
The Cathedral of St. John and St. Finbar after the fire of 1861.

Following the death of Bishop Ignatius A. Reynolds in March 1855, Father John H. McCaffrey of Mount St. Mary's College was appointed to succeed him but he refused to accept. It was not until December 11, 1857, that Pope Pius IX named Lynch the third Bishop of Charleston. He received his episcopal consecration on March 14, 1858, from Archbishop Francis Kenrick, with Bishops Michael Portier and John Barry serving as co-consecrators.

At the time, the Diocese of Charleston included the entire states of South Carolina and North Carolina, along with The Bahamas; it had also included all of Georgia until 1850, when the Diocese of Savannah was erected. During Lynch's tenure, North Carolina was separated into an apostolic vicariate in 1868 with James Gibbons as its bishop.

In December 1861, a fire in Charleston burned over 540 acres of the city, destroying the cathedral, the bishop's residence, and the diocesan library.

=== Civil War ===
The American Civil War began with the Battle of Fort Sumter at Charleston in April 1861. To celebrate the fort's fall to the Confederate States Army, Lynch ordered Te Deum (a hymn of thanksgiving) to be sung in the cathedral.

In August 1861, Lynch exchanged public letters with Archbishop John Hughes of New York about the war, which helped establish each man as a Catholic spokesman for their side. In a letter to Hughes, Lynch declared, "Taking up anti-slavery, making it a religious dogma, and carrying it into politics, [the North] have broken up the Union." He also wrote that the North lacked the military and economic capability to continue the war. He concluded:

The separation of the Southern States is un fait accompli. The Federal Government has no power to reverse it. Sooner or later it must be recognized. Why preface the recognition by a war equally needless and bloody?

==== Confederate emissary ====
On April 4, 1864, Confederate President Jefferson Davis appointed Lynch as Special Commissioner of the Confederate States of America to the States of the Church. In an accompanying letter, Confederate Secretary of State Judah P. Benjamin assigned Lynch to seek the pope's formal recognition of the Confederacy, as well as "enlightening opinions and molding impressions" among Catholic European countries.

Lynch traveled to Dublin, London, and Paris, where he had an audience with Emperor Napoleon III. He finally reached Rome on June 26, 1864, and was first received by Giacomo Antonelli, the Cardinal Secretary of State. On July 4, he had an audience with Pope Pius IX. By that time, there were no signs of an impending Confederacy victory, so Lynch was received simply as a bishop instead of a diplomat. According to Lynch, the pope told him:

When some foreign power will perhaps have to be called in as umpire...I might be called in as umpire, I wish it to be understood beforehand that I could not say anything directed to confirm and strengthen slavery...As to your slaves, I see clearly that it would be absurd to attempt as it were to cut the Gordian Knot, by an act of emancipation, but still something might be done looking to an improvement in their position or state, and to a gradual preparation for their freedom at a future opportune time.

While in Rome, at the request of Monsignor Francesco Nardi of the Roman Rota, Lynch wrote a pro-slavery pamphlet entitled, A Few Words on the Domestic Slavery in the Confederate States of America. Lynch's pamphlet, which was published in Italian, French, and German, began by saying:

To say that freedom is better than slavery, is to my mind very like saying that health is better than sickness. Yet this world is so unfortunate that both sickness and slavery have existed, do exist, and will continue to exist. I have never heard that any sane man proposes to banish all sickness, by slaying the doctors and burning all hospitals. But I have met philanthropists who in their horror of slavery...rush unto measures almost equally absurd, and far more destructive.

He then criticized the morality of African Americans by saying, "The negroes are, as a race, very prone to excesses, and, unless restrained, plunge madly into the lowest depths of licentiousness." He also wrote that abolishing slavery would lead to prohibitive economic costs. The pamphlet concluded:

At present the negroes are well provided and well cared for, happy and content. I know of no condition in which the abolitionists would place them, in which they would be equally so...Most of the plans they advocate would lead to internecine war of the most atrocious character, and would end either in the bloody reënslavement of the negroes, or more probably in their utter extinction.

Lynch's pamphlet failed to win Confederate recognition from the Vatican or any other country. On December 23, 1864, he wrote to Cardinal Alessandro Barnabò that he had submitted his resignation as Special Commissioner effective the following February. His return home was delayed for months, first by the lack of functioning Confederate ports and then by the collapse of the Confederacy itself. In a June 1865 letter to William H. Seward, Union diplomat Rufus King wrote:

I had an interview with [Lynch] at his request...He admitted that the cause of the south was hopeless, expressed a wish to return to his home and post of duty, and asked me on what terms he could be re-admitted into the United States. I told him that the first thing to be done was to take the oath of allegiance, and make his peace with the federal government. This he was willing and ready to do, if that would suffice; but he seemed apprehensive that if he returned to America he might be proceeded against criminally...I judge that he is effectually cured of his secession folly.

Through the efforts of Archbishop Martin John Spalding, Lynch received a pardon from President Andrew Johnson on August 4, 1865.

=== Postwar activities ===
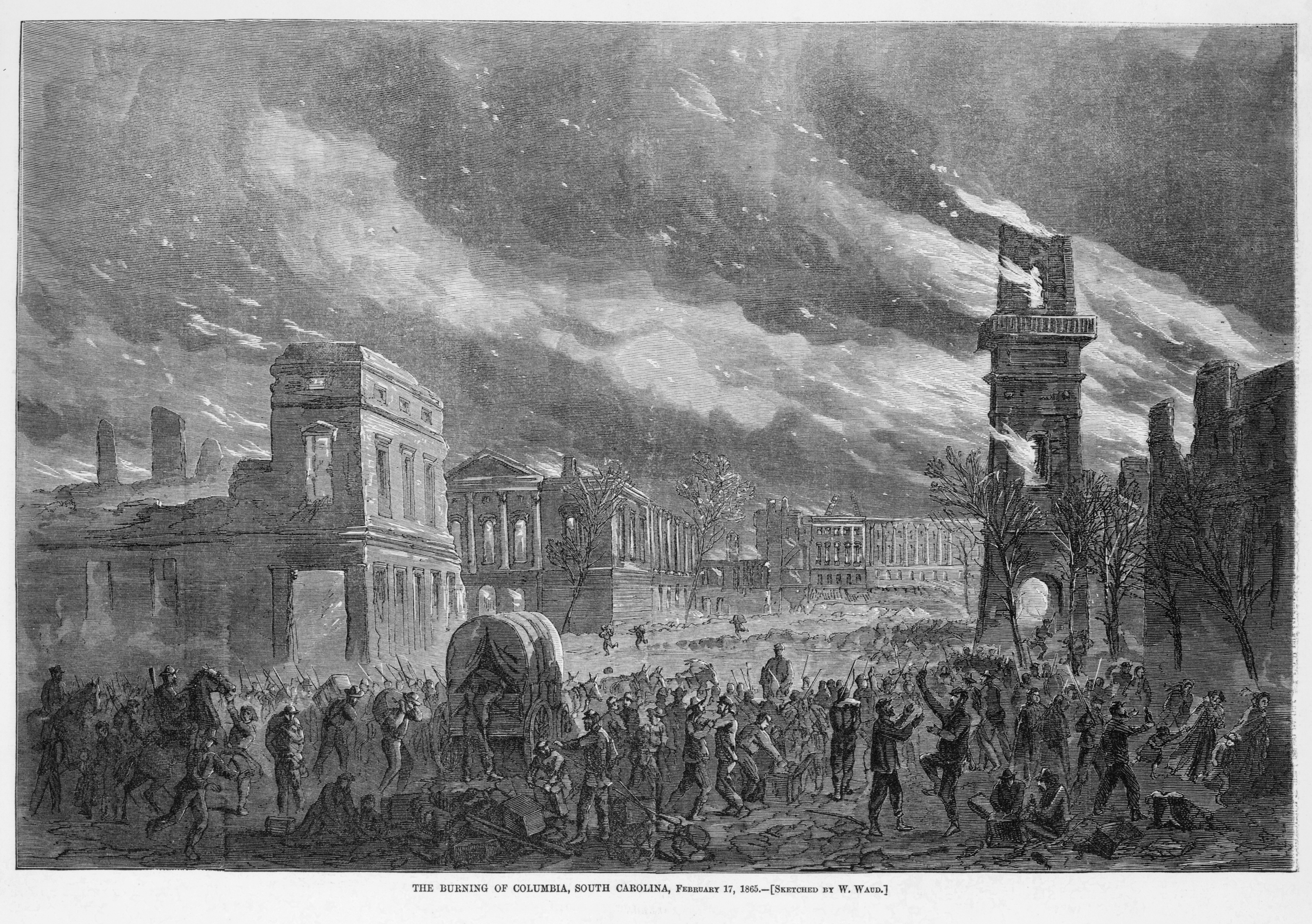
An artist's rendering of the burning of Columbia in February 1865.

When Lynch returned to the United States in December 1865, it had been over a year and a half since he had last seen his diocese. The capture of Columbia in February of that year had added to the damage of the 1861 Charleston fire, destroying St. Mary's College and the Ursuline convent. Lynch remarked, "There are ruins on every side of me...But I trust in God things will come straight."

Lynch dedicated most of the remaining 17 years of his tenure to the restoration of his diocese. At the end of the war, the diocesan debt ranged from $200,000 to $400,000; through fundraising tours in the North, Lynch was able to reduce that to $10,000. In 1867, he established St. Peter's Church in Charleston to serve the city's Black Catholics. While never coming to fruition, he also proposed establishing a community of Black Catholics on Folly Island.

From 1869 to 1870, Lynch attended the First Vatican Council, accompanied by Father James Corcoran (his former fellow seminarian in Rome) as his personal theologian. In 1880, when Cardinal John McCloskey of New York was seeking a coadjutor archbishop to succeed him, Lynch was the cardinal's first choice. McCloskey and his suffragan bishops submitted to Rome a terna, or list of candidates, that included Lynch, Bishop Michael Corrigan of the Diocese of Newark, and Bishop John Loughlin of the Diocese of Brooklyn. However, Rome was not favorable to Lynch's age (he was then 63) or his role during the war; Corrign was appointed instead.

== Death ==
Lynch died in Charleston on February 26, 1882, at the age of 64.

== Sources ==
- Heisser, David; White, Stephen (2015). Patrick N. Lynch, 1817-1882: Third Catholic Bishop of Charleston. University of South Carolina Press.
- Heisser, David (2017). "Bishop Patrick Lynch and the Confederacy". In Mitchell, Arthur (ed.). Fighting Irish in the American Civil War and the Invasion of Mexico. MacFarland & Company, Inc.

Catholic Church titles
Preceded by Ignatius A. Reynolds	Bishop of Charleston; 1857-1882	Succeeded by Henry P. Northrop
