= Bishop England High School =

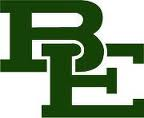

Location
- 363 Seven Farms Drive; Charleston, South Carolina 29492; United States; 32°51′26″N 79°54′59″W

Information
- Other name: BE
- School type: Diocesan private school
- Motto: Intrat ad discere, exitus confirmavit (Enter to Learn, Exit to Serve)
- Religious affiliation: Roman Catholic
- Patron saint: Our Lady of Mercy
- Established: 1915 (111 years ago)
- Founder: Rev. Msgr. Joseph L. O'Brien
- Authority: Bishop of Charleston
- Oversight: Diocese of Charleston
- CEEB code: 410370
- Principal: Patrick Finneran
- Chaplain: Fr. Andrew Fryml
- Grades: 9–12
- Gender: Co-educational
- Hours in school day: 7
- Campus size: 40 acres (16 ha)
- Campus type: Suburban
- Colors: Green and white
- Athletics: 20 varsity teams
- Athletics conference: SCHSL Class AA
- Mascot: Battling Bishops
- Accreditation: Southern Association of Colleges and Schools
- Newspaper: Bishop's Quarterly
- Yearbook: Miscellany
- Website: behs.com

Bishop England High School is a diocesan Roman Catholic four-year high school in Charleston, South Carolina, United States. It was located on Calhoun Street in downtown Charleston until it moved to a newly constructed 40-acre campus located on Daniel Island in 1998. With an enrollment of 730, Bishop England is the largest private high school in the state of South Carolina. The school was founded in 1915 and was named after John England, the first bishop of the Roman Catholic Diocese of Charleston.

== History ==
On September 22, 1915, Catholic High School opened as a department of the Cathedral School on Queen Street. The Reverend Monsignor Joseph L. O'Brien organized the school with the cooperation of the Reverend James J. May. There were 74 students enrolled in four grade levels: seventh, ninth, tenth, and eleventh. That first faculty consisted of three diocesan priests and three Sisters of Charity of Our Lady of Mercy (O.L.M.).

By the spring of 1916, a growing student enrollment made larger quarters imperative, and the school was moved to a building used by the Cenacle Sisters, an order of nuns, where it remained until 1919. The main building housed the senior high school, and an annex was converted into a biology lab and a seventh grade classroom. The school offered two courses of study: college preparatory and business.

With the Catholic community of Charleston increasing, a drive was initiated to raise $50,000 for a school building to replace the one being used. From 1919 to 1921, the school was housed in its third location at Gregorian Hall on George Street, and its old location was demolished and replaced. The funding drive was a huge success, and ground was broken on July 5, 1921 on the $60,000 building. The school was opened in its fourth building at 203 Calhoun Street on February 18, 1922. By 1940, 25 years after its inception, the school's enrollment had reached 318 students, and the faculty had nearly doubled.

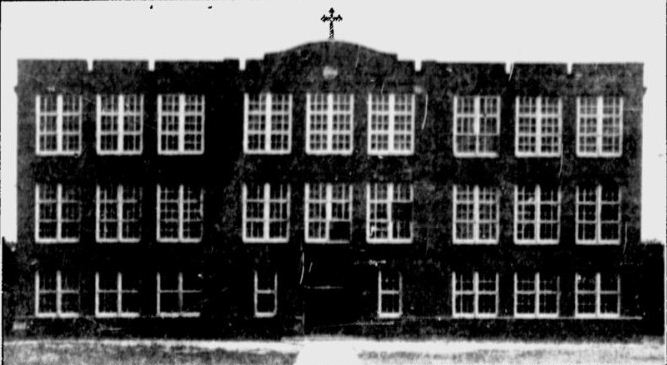
Bishop England's fourth building had 14 classrooms and was designed so that wings could be added later.

In 1947, the school's first rector, Monsignor O'Brien, retired after having served 32 years, and he was followed by the Bishop England alumnus, the Reverend Monsignor John L. Manning.

The Catholic community of Charleston sponsored two expansion drives for the high school in the late 1940s; two new buildings were added to the campus. In 1947, the west wing (which housed an auditorium, science laboratory, and offices) was built, and in 1948 the east wing, which was the Father O'Brien gymnasium, was built. Additional land was acquired in 1957, and a two-story annex was constructed, providing eight new classrooms and additional office space.

In June 1959, the Reverend William J. Croghan, Class of 1940, was appointed as the third rector of Bishop England. By 1960, the faculty had grown to 31 members, and 740 students were enrolled. Additional property was purchased in 1963 and in 1964 on Coming Street, Calhoun Street, and Pitt Street; this property provided classrooms, living quarters for teachers, a maintenance shop, facilities for the school nurse, and a schoolyard. The 1964 school year began with a new rector, the Reverend Robert J. Kelly, and enrollment grew to nearly 800 students. Because of overcrowding between 1966 and 1968, freshman classes were conducted in the old St. Patrick's School on St. Phillip Street.

Bishop England integrated in 1964. In 1968, it merged with Immaculate Conception High School. The student body numbered 850 students with 250 freshmen. The former Immaculate Conception School building on Coming Street became the Bishop England Freshman Building.

Nicholas J. Theos first became principal in 1973. Father Robert Kelly was for a time after this succeeded by The Reverend Charles Kelly. After the lapse of a brief interval, Father Robert Kelly returned as rector, where he remained until 1990.

Mr Theos established the Bishop England Endowment Fund in 1985, before which the school had no endowment of any kind. In 1990, The Reverend Lawrence B. McInerny, JCL, Class of 1969, became the third alumnus to serve as rector of the school.

In 1976, a former church building at 172 Calhoun Street was purchased from the College of Charleston. Occupancy took place in 1977 and housed the freshmen.

In 1993, four modular units (eight rooms) were added to accommodate increasing enrollment and temporary additional elementary grades, providing four classrooms, a conference room, and a chapel where mass was celebrated. Enrollment in 1995 was 805, the largest of any private high school in the state.

In September 1995, Bishop David B Thompson officially announced that the school was moving to Daniel Island and its current property would be sold to the College of Charleston. The college's Addlestone Library and Rivers Green replaced the Bishop England campus.

The Daniel Island Development Company, which was partially owned by the Harry Frank Guggenheim Foundation, donated 40 acres (160,000 m^{2}) of land for the school. Construction began in 1996, and Bishop Thompson blessed the ground at the site of the new Bishop England High School in June 1997.

In 1998, Mr Theos retired after 25 years of service to Bishop England. David Held, who had been the associate principal since 1997, then became the principal.

With the help of students, alumni, faculty and volunteers, the school was moved to the campus on Daniel Island in summer 1998.

In fall 2010, Michael C. Bolchoz, became the first alumnus principal.

In 2011, the Bishop England athletic program won its 100th overall state championship, making it the most successful in South Carolina history. In the same year, the school's volleyball team broke the national record for overall state championships, currently with 28, along with the South Carolina record for consecutive state titles, with 18 in a row.

On July 1, 2013, Patrick Finneran assumed the role of principal.

The class of 2015 was the school's 100th graduating class.

By 2023, Mr Finneran was serving as the first President of Bishop England High School. Mary Ann Bolchoz Tucker, Class of 1984 and faculty member since 1989, became the first alumna to serve as principal

== Sexual abuse scandal ==
On May 2, 2019, former employee Jeffrey Scofield was arrested for voyeurism charges. It was alleged that Scofield recorded male students changing in their locker room through a window that connected his office to the boys' locker room. A student using his phone noticed pornographic images of the students and reported it to the school. Scofield confessed to "liking younger guys" and was fired by the school. Scofield pled guilty to the charges and served 18 months probation. On February 4, 2021, the school and the Roman Catholic Diocese of Charleston were sued for $300 million due to the invasion of privacy and potential sexual exploitation the windows provided. On April 29, 2022, another lawsuit was filed against the school about the windows, claiming that the school was negligent in caring for the students and monitoring the staff's whereabouts and alleging that employees were aware that this was happening. Four days later, another lawsuit was filed by a female student, claiming that the school was negligent in not protecting her from being filmed and not catching Scofield sooner.

== Incidents ==
During the 2024 season, Bishop England and Philip Simmons faced numerous threats, including bombings and shootings, directed at each other. As a result, the games were cancelled, and Bishop England forfeited, citing these threats as the main reason. Additionally, Bishop England students made racist comments toward the Philip Simmons players. A child was found dead in a car seat in the backseat of a vehicle at Bishop England High School on Aug. 25, 2023. Authorities in South Carolina announced they will not pursue criminal charges against a mother whose 16-month-old daughter died after being left inside a locked car outside Bishop England High School on Daniel Island in August. The child was found unresponsive on the afternoon of Aug. 25 by three students inside a blue Subaru SUV parked near the school’s main entrance. Berkeley County Coroner Darnell Hartwell stated that the mother, a longtime teacher at the school, had arrived at work around 7:30 a.m. and mistakenly believed she had dropped her daughter off at daycare. The incident prompted widespread grief within the Bishop England High School community and beyond.

== Academics ==
Bishop England is supported by several K–8 Catholic feeder schools in the Charleston area, including Blessed Sacrament School, Christ Our King-Stella Maris School, The Nativity School, Divine Redeemer School, Summerville Catholic School, St John’s Catholic School and Charleston Catholic School.

Students are required to take four years of theology, mathematics, and English. Catholic mass and various prayer services are compulsory throughout the year, although a significant number of students are not Catholic. Students are required to earn credits in world language, social sciences, fine arts, technology, lab sciences, and physical education. Language instruction is offered in Spanish and French. Bishop England also offers 15 Advanced Placement courses for college credit.

== Athletics ==
In a 2005 edition, the Bishop England athletic program was named number one in the state of South Carolina, regardless of size, by Sports Illustrated, In 2013, sports publication MaxPreps ranked Bishop England's athletic program 5th in the nation in a combined rankings list of both public and private schools. That same year, USA Today named Bishop England among the top 10 high school athletic programs in the U.S., writing that "the Bishops carry a tradition of dominance unmatched in the state of South Carolina and much of the Southeast." In a 2020 special report, MaxPreps again named Bishop England the state's most successful high school athletic program. The publication also ranked the school within the top 5 high school programs in the nation, writing that "no other high school athletic program in the American South has been so dominant, in so many sports, for so long." The school has been awarded the SC Athletic Director's Cup for 20 consecutive years, given to the top athletic program in the state.

The volleyball program currently holds the national record for state championships with 28 overall. The team won every state title between 2000 and 2017, and their championship win on November 4, 2017, gave them an 18th consecutive title, also a national record. Bishop England's overall state title count in all sports currently stands at 155, the highest of any South Carolina school.

It is one of three private schools in the state that compete in the SCHSL instead of SCISA, along with Christ Church and St. Joseph's School, both located in Greenville. The Bishops compete in the AAA division. The Be a Bishop Backer Club, dubbed "the Triple B Club", funds a staff of on-campus medical trainers for BE athletes.

Bishop England’s primary rival across all sports is Porter-Gaud School. The rivalry dates back over 100 years and is one of the most prominent in Charleston-area high school sports. In girls’ sports, a heavy rivalry with Ashley Hall also exists.

- Fall sports: volleyball, American football, girls' golf, girls' tennis, swimming, cross country, sailing, cheerleading
- Winter sports: wrestling, basketball, ice hockey
- Spring sports: baseball, softball, soccer, track, boys' tennis, boys' golf, lacrosse, rugby

=== State championships ===
- Baseball: 1997, 1998, 2003, 2005, 2007, 2009, 2011, 2017, 2018, 2019
- Basketball - Boys: 1963
- Basketball - Girls: 2012, 2014, 2015, 2016, 2017, 2019
- Cross Country - Boys: 2009, 2010, 2012, 2019, 2021, 2022
- Cross Country - Girls: 2000, 2006, 2007
- Football: 2011, 2012
- Golf - Boys: 2006, 2008, 2013, 2014, 2015, 2018, 2019
- Golf - Girls: 2015, 2016
- Lacrosse - Boys: 2017, 2021
- Lacrosse - Girls: 2016, 2017, 2018, 2019, 2021, 2022
- Soccer - Boys: 1984, 1992, 1993, 1994, 1995, 1998, 1999, 2000, 2001, 2005, 2006, 2007, 2008, 2009, 2011, 2013, 2016
- Soccer - Girls: 2000, 2002, 2003, 2004, 2005, 2006, 2007, 2008, 2009, 2016, 2018, 2019
- Softball: 2004
- Swimming - Boys: 2016, 2025
- Swimming - Girls: 2017, 2022, 2023, 2024, 2025
- Tennis - Boys: 1979, 1986, 1991, 1992, 1993, 1994, 1995, 1998, 2015, 2018, 2019
- Tennis - Girls: 1983, 1988, 1989, 1990, 1991, 1992, 1993, 1997, 1998, 1999, 2000, 2001, 2003, 2007, 2009, 2011, 2012, 2013, 2014, 2015, 2016, 2017, 2018, 2020, 2021
- Track - Boys: 2000, 2008, 2011, 2015
- Track - Girls: 2001, 2002, 2003, 2004, 2005, 2006, 2007, 2008, 2009, 2013, 2014, 2017, 2019
- Volleyball - Girls: 1977, 1978, 1981, 1985, 1988, 1989, 1990, 1993, 1994, 1998, 2000, 2001, 2002, 2003, 2004, 2005, 2006, 2007, 2008, 2009, 2010, 2011, 2012, 2013, 2014, 2015, 2016, 2017
- Volleyball - Boys: 2022, 2023

== Traditions ==
Bishop England is among the older educational institutions in the city of Charleston and among the oldest private secondary institutions in the state. Generations of Charleston families have attended the school, making it a significant part of the city's history. Several traditions take place throughout the year. These include:

- John England Day – an all-school carnival held every September to celebrate the school's namesake, Bishop John England
- Key Club Food Drive – held each year leading up to Thanksgiving to support local charities and shelters.
- Student vs Faculty Basketball Game
- Academic Awards Night – award ceremony held each spring to honor students for their academic achievement throughout the year
- Ring Mass – blessing of class rings by the Bishop of Charleston, held each spring
- Senior Awards – presentation of scholarships and awards to graduating seniors
- Baccalaureate Mass
- Tie Throwing on the Trees – occurs once a year on the last school day of February
- Harbor Cruise – celebratory cruise in Charleston Harbor for graduating seniors, held each spring in the weeks leading up to Commencement

== Facilities ==
Academic

- 45 classrooms
- 4 science labs
- Art studio
- 2 technology labs
- The Bishop Thompson Center for the Performing Arts
- The Commons
- The Monsignor Manning Library

Athletic

- Jack Cantey Stadium
- Father Kelly Field
- Father O'Brien Gymnasium
- Michael L. Runey III Tennis Center
- Carl Edward Poole Jr. Track and Field Complex
- Weight and fitness performance rooms
- Golf hosts their home matches at the nearby Daniel Island Club

Spiritual

- Our Lady of Mercy Chapel
- Campus Ministry Center
- Saint Clare of Assisi Roman Catholic Church

== Notable alumni ==
Politics

- Chrissy Adams (class of 1985) — South Carolina solicitor and lawyer
- Thomas F. Hartnett (class of 1960) — U.S. representative from South Carolina, member of South Carolina House of Representatives and South Carolina Senate
- Joseph P. Riley Jr. (class of 1960) — mayor of Charleston, 1975–2016

TV, film, and media

- Dorothea Benton Frank (class of 1969) — author of numerous books set in the South Carolina Lowcountry
- Thomas Gibson (class of 1980) — actor
- T. Christian Miller (class of 1988) — two-time Pulitzer prize winning journalist
- Vanessa Lachey (class of 1999) — Miss Teen USA 1998, television personality, television host, fashion model and actress

Athletics

- Drew Meyer (class of 1999) — Major League Baseball player for the Houston Astros
- Temoc Suarez (class of 1992) — soccer player; spent three seasons in Major League Soccer, two in the National Professional Soccer League and five in the USL First Division
- Dennis Williams (born 1965), basketball player
- Leo Albano (class of 2018) — University of Notre Dame running back

Artists

- E. Michelle Seay (class of 1990) — watercolorist specializing in Charleston streetscapes, selected designer of the official Piccolo Spoleto Festival poster for 2019

== In popular culture ==
Portions of the film Dear John, starring Channing Tatum and Amanda Seyfried and based on the novel by Nicholas Sparks, were filmed on the school's former campus in downtown Charleston.

Portions of the film The Dangerous Lives of Altar Boys, starring Jodie Foster, were filmed inside the buildings from the school's former location on Calhoun Street.

Portions of the film O, starring Mekhi Phifer, Julia Stiles and Josh Hartnett, were filmed in the classrooms and gym at the school's former location on Calhoun Street.
