= Patrick N. L. Bellinger =

United States Navy admiral

Patrick Nieson Lynch Bellinger
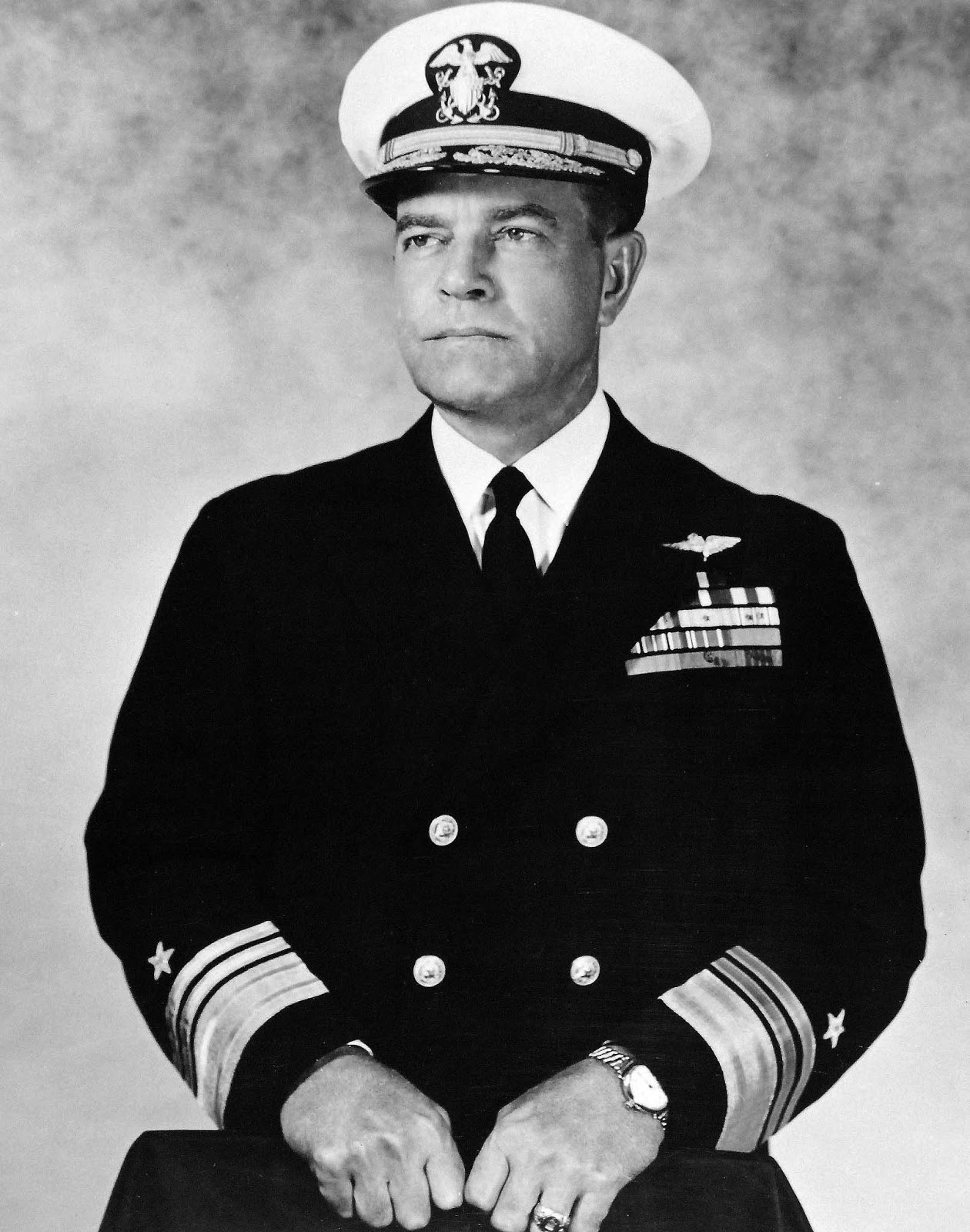
- Bellinger as Vice admiral during World War II.
- Born: October 8, 1885; Cheraw, South Carolina, US
- Died: May 30, 1962 (aged 76); Clifton Forge, Virginia, US
- Burial place: Arlington National Cemetery
- Relatives: Patrick Neeson Lynch, 3rd Bishop of Charleston, South Carolina (grand-uncle)
- Military career
- Allegiance: United States
- Branch: United States Navy
- Service years: 1907–1947
- Rank: Vice Admiral
- Nickname: "Pat"
- Service number: 0-6598
- Commands: Naval Air Force Atlantic; Patrol Wing Two; Naval Air Station, Norfolk; USS Ranger; USS Langley; USS Wright
- Conflicts: Occupation of Veracruz; World War I World War II: Attack on Pearl Harbor; Battle of Midway
- Awards: Navy Cross; Distinguished Service Medal

Patrick Nieson Lynch Bellinger CBE (October 8, 1885 – May 30, 1962) was a highly decorated officer in the United States Navy with the rank of Vice Admiral. A Naval aviator and a naval aviation pioneer, he participated in the Trans-Atlantic flight from Newfoundland to Azores in May 1919 and was decorated with Navy Cross, the United States military's second-highest decoration awarded for valor.

During the Japanese Attack on Pearl Harbor, Bellinger served as Commander, Patrol Wing Two and he was responsible for sending the message, "Air raid, Pearl Harbor. This is no drill", which was the first notice to the outside world of the attack. He was later appointed Commander, Naval Air Forces, Atlantic and distinguished himself during the U-boat campaign with Atlantic Fleet.

== Early career ==
=== Early service ===
Bellinger was born on October 8, 1885, in Cheraw, South Carolina, as the son of Carnot Ambrose Bellinger and Eleanor Lynch. He was raised by his maternal aunt when his mother and sister died a few years after his birth. His maternal great-uncle was Patrick Neeson Lynch, 3rd Bishop of Charleston.

He graduated from the high school and enrolled the Clemson College in Clemson, South Carolina. Bellinger completed one year at Clemson in electrical engineering, before received an appointment to the United States Naval Academy at Annapolis, Maryland, in July 1903. He graduated in 1907.

He graduated as passed midshipman with Bachelor of Science degree on June 6, 1907, and was assigned to newly commissioned battleship USS Vermont. Bellinger took part in a cruise around the world with the Great White Fleet, visiting the Port of Spain, Rio de Janeiro and Punta Arenas. During the stop in San Francisco in May 1908, he was transferred to the battleship USS Wisconsin and continued in the cruise, visiting Melbourne, Sydney, Auckland, Manila, Yokohama, Colombo, Suez Canal, Port Said, Gibraltar and then crossed the Atlantic to return to Hampton Roads in February 1909.

Bellinger was ordered to cruiser USS Montgomery for instruction in torpedoes in March 1909 and was commissioned ensign on June 7, 1909, after serving two years at sea then required by law. He completed the instruction in October that year and was ordered to Philadelphia Navy Yard, where he assisted in fitting out of new battleship USS South Carolina, which was completed in March 1910. He served as assistant gunnery officer to Thomas T. Craven and participated in her shakedown cruise to the Caribbean Sea and Sea trials at Virginia Capes. Bellinger convinced Craven to assign him command of one of the four 12-inch turrets for the trials and his guns made hits 88.5 percent of the time on a towed target and in record time.

Due to Bellinger's skills, South Carolina won the Fleet Gunnery Trophy and Craven was promoted to head of fleet gunnery training in the Office of Chief of Naval Operations. Bellinger then took part in the cruise to Europe with stops at Cherbourg, France, and at the Isle of Portland and after which South Carolina returned to the United States for maintenance. The South Carolina then returned with the Atlantic Fleet to Europe, visiting Copenhagen, Denmark; Stockholm, Sweden; and Kronstadt, Russia and Kiel, Germany, where Bellinger was charmed by a plane flying over the harbor.

=== First aviation duty ===
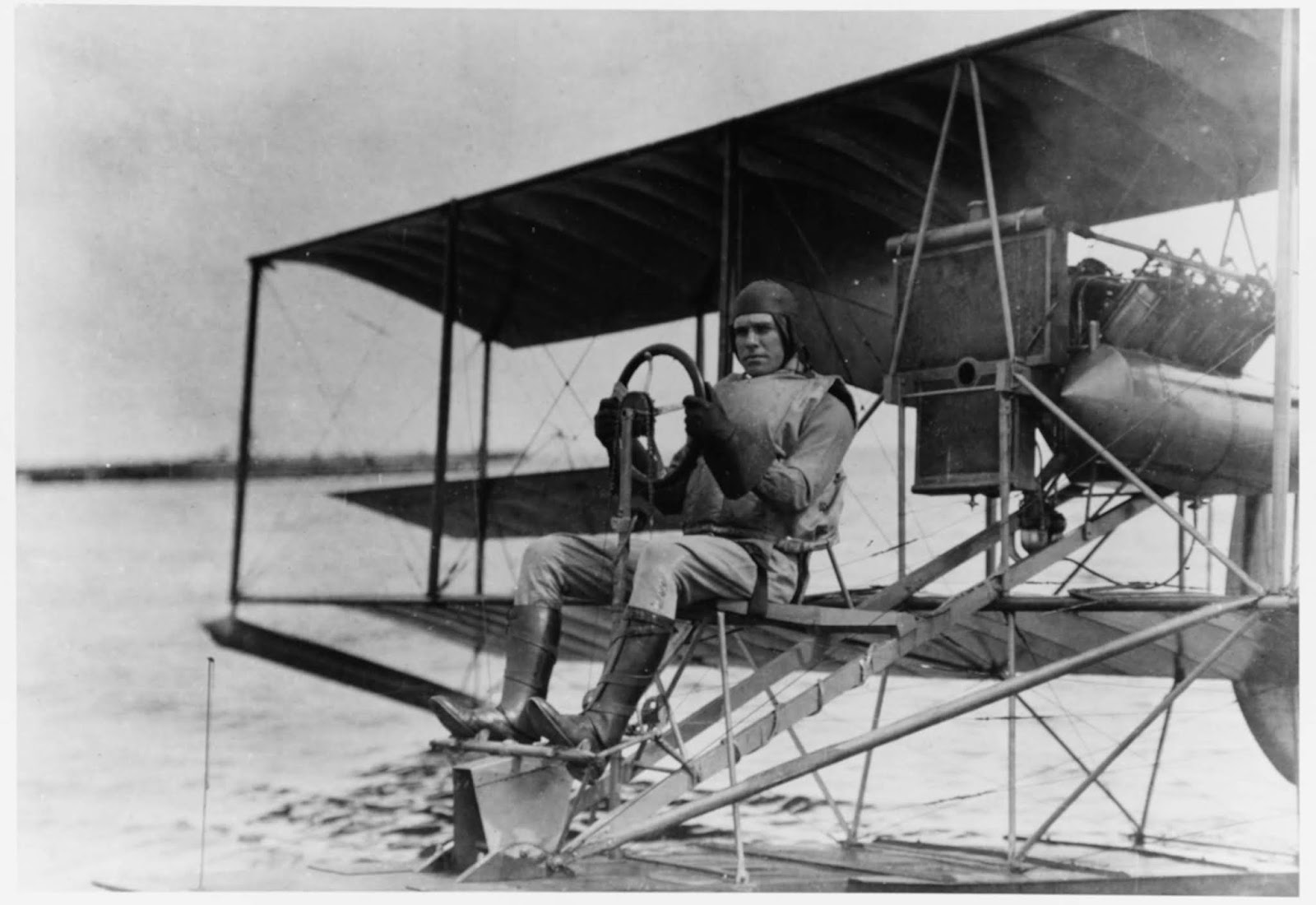
Lieutenant j.g. Bellinger at the controls of a Curtiss A-type seaplane in late 1912.

After return stateside and naval review in New York City, Bellinger asked his old superior officer, Thomas Craven, who was now in Washington, D.C., to be assigned for aviation training. Craven agreed and recommended him to Lieutenant Theodore G. Ellyson, who headed aviation training at the Naval Academy. Bellinger also had requested submarine duty in April 1912 so he could learn about gasoline engines that were similar to aircraft engines. He reported to the Atlantic Submarine Flotilla under then-Lieutenant Chester W. Nimitz and completed his instruction aboard submarine tender USS Severn in September that year. Bellinger was promoted to Lieutenant (junior grade) on June 7, 1912.

He then assumed command of training submarine USS C-4 and sailed to Greenbury Point Aviation Experimental Camp across the Severn River from the Naval Academy in Annapolis, Maryland. Bellinger and Ellyson then participated in the test to see if submarines could be located under water from the air. The results of the test convinced Bellinger of the usefulness of aircraft to the Navy. Future admiral John H. Towers also participated in the tests and took Bellinger for observation flights.

Due to error in the administration, Bellinger was not ordered for aviation training until mid-November 1912, when he urged Ellyson, who arranged to send new orders for aviation training for Bellinger. He was ordered back to Greenbury Point, where he entered the aviation training with John Towers as his instructor. Because of severe weather conditions during the winter in Annapolis, in early January 1913, the pilot training school was sent to Guantanamo Bay, Cuba, to train with the Fleet.

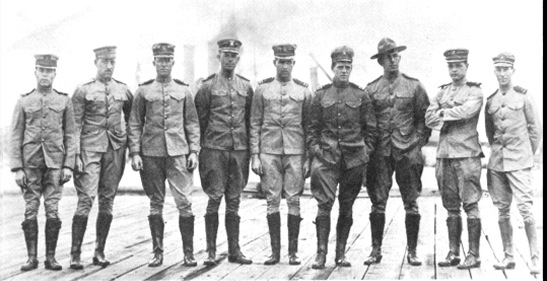
Bellinger (3rd from left) at NAS Pensacola, Florida in 1914.

Bellinger undertook training together with Alfred A. Cunningham, Godfrey Chevalier and William Billingsley, and designated naval aviator on March 5, 1913, as Naval Aviator #8. During war games he demonstrated aviation ability in scouting and in locating mine fields and submarines and made the American Seaplane record of 6,200 feet, an altitude record that lasted for two years. In May 1913, Bellinger was together with Lieutenant Holden C. Richardson ordered to Burgess Company in Marblehead, Massachusetts, to test a new flying boat being built for the Navy.

On January 10, 1914, Bellinger together with Lieutenants John H. Towers and Henry C. Mustin arrived to Pensacola, Florida, where they established first Naval aviation training station. The first aviation unit consisted of nine officers, 23 enlisted men, and seven aircraft. Bellinger remained in that assignment until mid-April 1914, when he assumed command of Aviation Section aboard battleship USS Mississippi.

He then embarked for Veracruz, Mexico, where he flew patrol missions during the occupation of that port. Bellinger made flights over enemy's territory and was under fire by ground troops. His plane was struck on one occasion by rifle bullets. This was the first occasion when a U.S. plane was under enemy fire and Bellinger was recommended for the Medal of Honor, which was ultimately not granted.

In July 1914, Bellinger was transferred to the armored cruiser USS North Carolina, which served as aviation training ship and he participated in the experiments with naval aviation. The North Carolina became the first ship to launch an aircraft using a catapult while Bellinger served aboard. He returned to Pensacola in January 1915 and participated in the several feats including American Altitude Record for Seaplane of 10,000 feet or launch from the upgraded catapult at Pensacola.

He then served again aboard North Carolina and participated in the duty in connection with aeronautics from May 1916 and returned to Pensacola in April 1917. While there Bellinger conducted the first night seaplane flight in which floodlights were employed on the beach for illuminating water. This marked the first phase of regular night flying instruction in the Navy. He was promoted to Lieutenant on August 29, 1916.

=== World War I ===
Following the United States entry into World War I, Bellinger was promoted to the temporary rank of lieutenant commander on October 15, 1917, and ordered to the newly established Naval Air Station Hampton Roads, Virginia, as first commanding officer of that station. He was responsible for the initial expansion of the station and also supervised the instruction of many regular and reserve navy pilots, including future Secretary of the Navy, James Forrestal, who was a member of the Princeton University Naval Reserve Flying Corps at the time.

During Bellinger's tenure, more pilots were trained there than any other station, including Naval Air Station Pensacola or approximately 40 percent of the total of 1,656 Naval Aviators. Student pilots were given about 400 minutes of flying instruction in Curtiss trainers. Upon completion, they soloed for five hours in Curtiss Navy Flying Boats and then shifted to the larger Curtiss N-9 seaplanes. This was a very short training time compared to that which naval pilots receive today, but apparently very effective. Many became "aces" in Europe by shooting down at least three enemy aircraft.

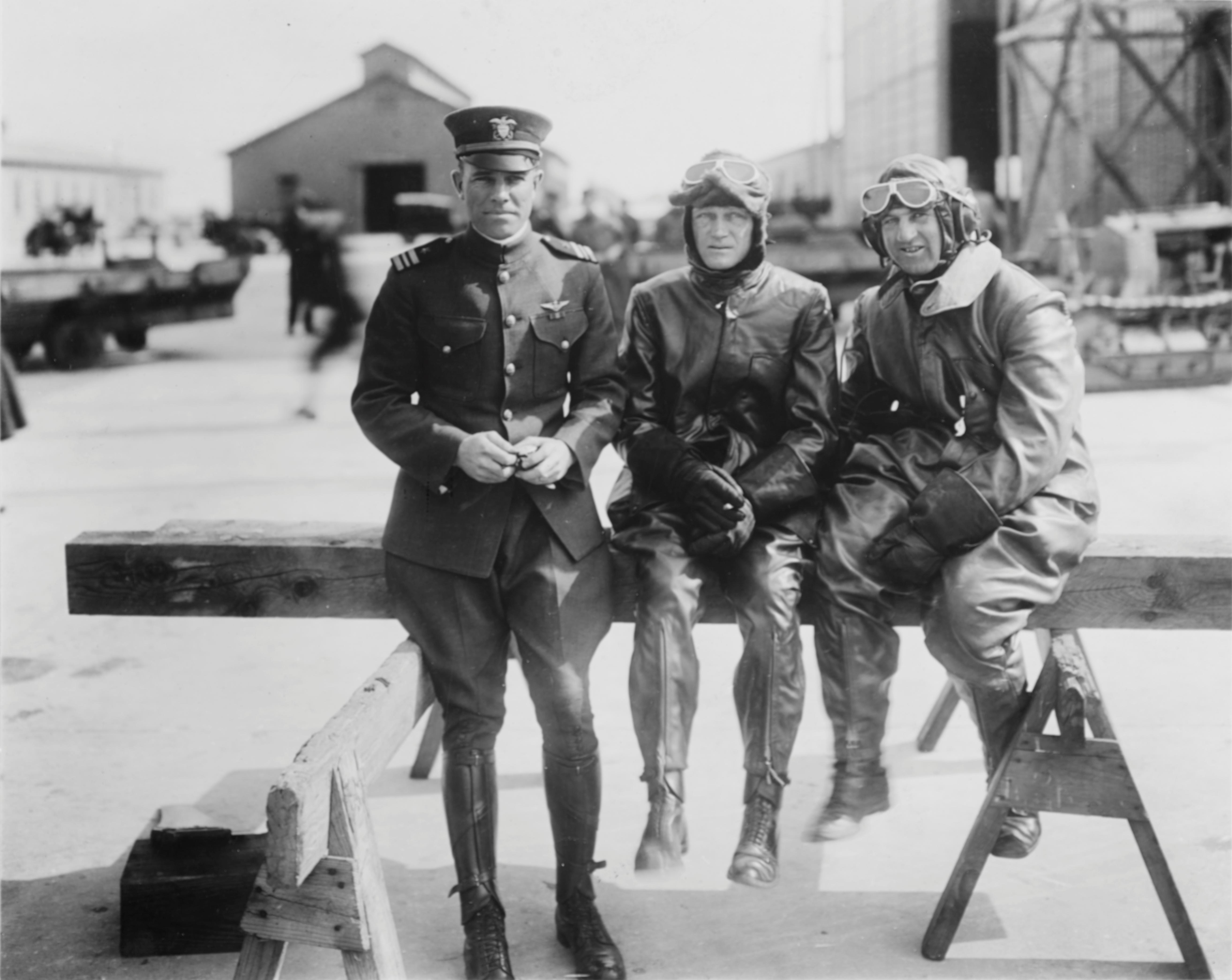
The Crew of NC-1 Seaplane: Bellinger, Mitscher and Barin, May 1919.

=== Trans-Atlantic flight ===
In May 1919, Bellinger was attached to the Seaplane Division One under his old superior, Commander John H. Towers and was tasked with the command of Curtiss NC seaplane with designation NC-1. Towers commanded whole division and also seaplane NC-3 and Bellinger's Naval Academy classmate, Lieutenant commander Albert C. Read, commanded seaplane NC-4. The Seaplane Division One was tasked with Trans-Atlantic crossing from Newfoundland to Azores.

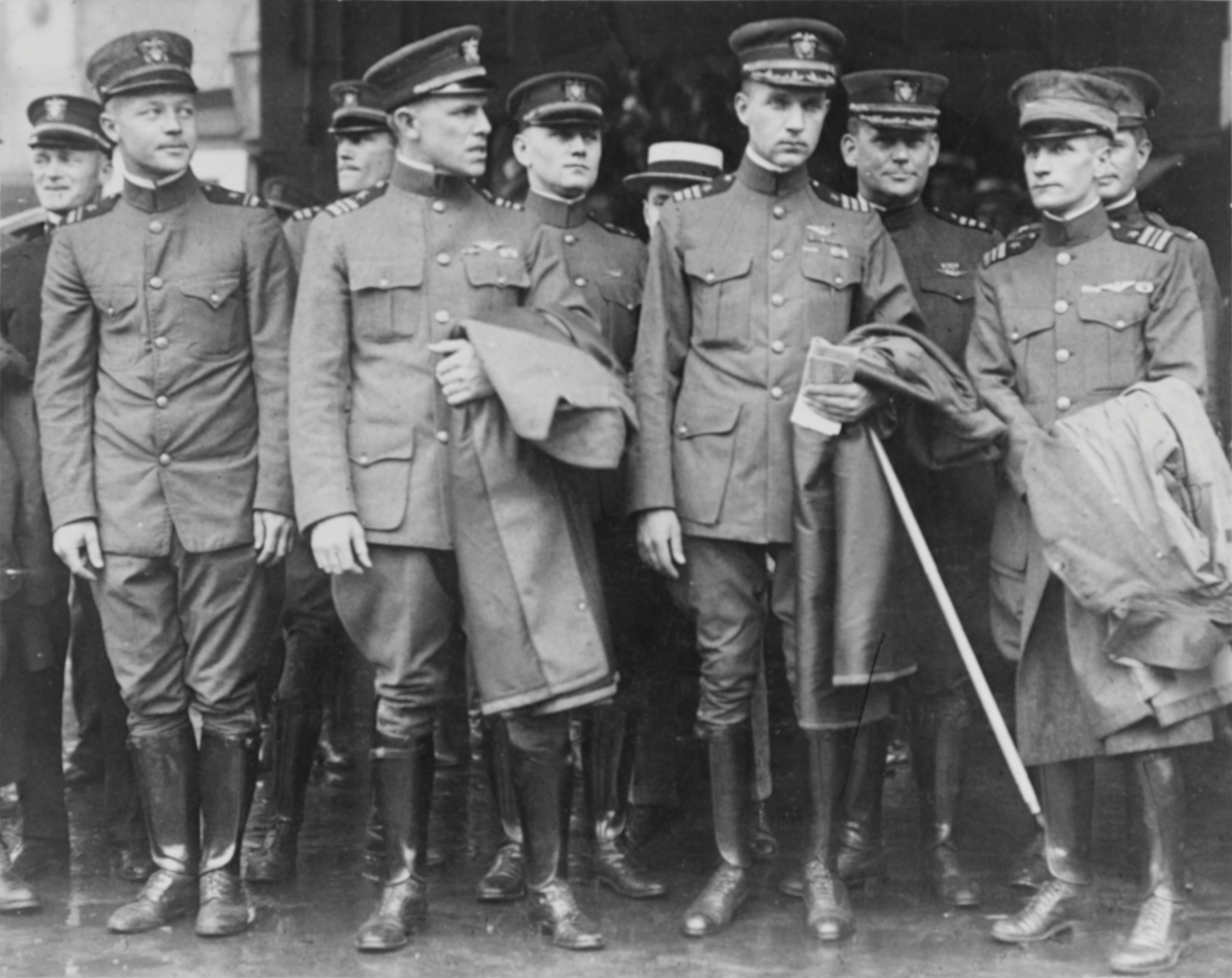
Bellinger (second from left) along with John Henry Towers (holding cane) and Albert C. Read (right).

They departed from Naval Air Station Rockaway on May 8, 1919, and arrived at Trepassey, Newfoundland and after repairs and refitting, the NCs took off for the Azores on May 16. Unfortunately bad weather and high seas forced the crews of NC-1 (Bellinger) and NC-3 (Towers) to abort the mission and regretfully left their plane which sank. The NC-4 (Read) continued the mission and as the only plane reached successfully the original target, when arrived at the town of Horta on Faial Island in the Azores on May 17, 1919. Bellinger, Towers, and their crews were rescued by Greek freighter Ionia.

Although Bellinger and his crew did not complete the flight, he was cited for its vigorous effort and an outstanding example of heroic persistence in face of nature's worst odds. He received the Navy Cross, which at the time was the United States Navy's third-highest decoration. Bellinger was also made a commander of the Order of the Tower and Sword by the Portuguese government on June 3, 1919.

== Interwar period ==
=== Fight for the Naval Aviation ===
Bellinger was ordered to the Officer of Chief of Naval Operations in Washington, D.C., in June 1919 and was attached mostly to the aviation duty. During October and November 1920, he served as the naval observer of the army's bombing of the obsolete battleship USS Indiana in Tangier Sound in the Chesapeake Bay and later served as Naval Observer during the bombing of the former German battleship Ostfriesland, which was sunk by Army Brigadier General Billy Mitchell's planes in the Atlantic Ocean a few miles off the Virginia Capes in July 1921.

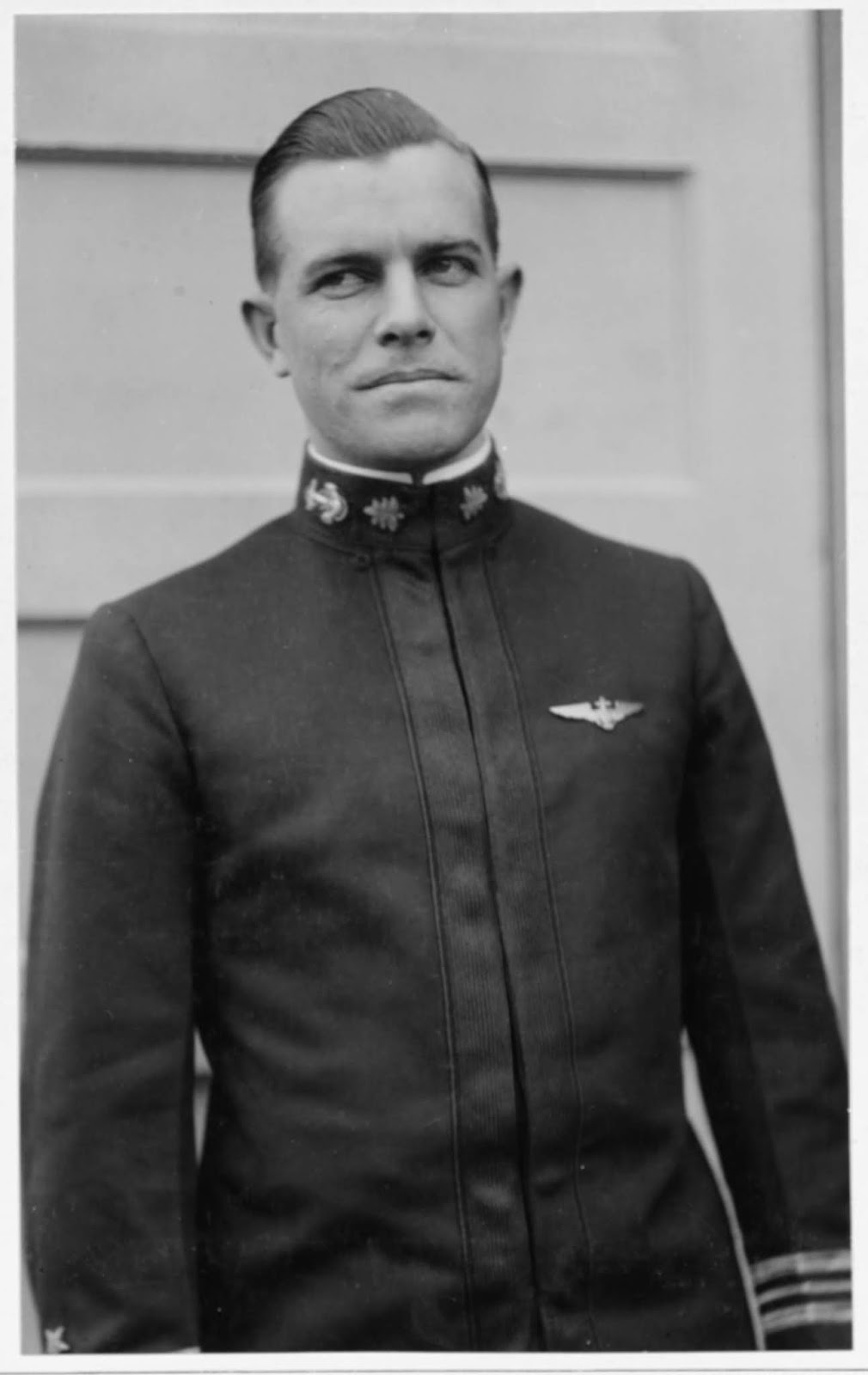
Bellinger as Lieutenant commander in 1919.

During the tests, the army successfully sank both targets and General Mitchell claimed that the success of his land-based planes made naval aviation unnecessary, but Bellinger disagreed with that opinion and for the rest of his career, he remained strong advocate of Naval aviation. He stated that aircraft should be with the fleet to gain control of the air above it, prior to any naval battle.

Bellinger was meanwhile transferred to the newly established Bureau of Aeronautics under Rear admiral William A. Moffett, where he remained until October 1921, when he joined Aircraft Squadrons, Pacific Fleet. He was later transferred to Aircraft Squadrons, Scouting Fleet and remained that assignment until June 1923, when he was transferred to aircraft tender USS Wright under Commander Lamar R. Leahy. Bellinger later became executive officer of that vessel and was detached in September 1924 in order to enter instruction at Naval War College in Newport, Rhode Island. While at the College, he was promoted to Commander on November 16, 1924.

Upon graduation one year later, he served for brief period on the staff of the college and also held additional duty as aviation expert on the Morrow Board, named after its chairman, Dwight Morrow. The Board of inquiry had task to determine the future of military aviation. Bellinger made nine recommendations including the need for naval aviation to be a combatant force within the fleet. Among other things he recommended that naval aviation be recognized as a permanent career for officers and enlisted men; that there be established a "flight line" to determine succession to command; that commanders of aviation activities including aircraft carriers and tenders only be officers permanently assigned to naval aviation; that seniority of officers in naval aviation be fairly integrated into the fleet; that a school of strategy and tactics be established for naval aviation; and that a separate naval aviation experiment and test station be established. Most of them were included in the board's final report.

In May and June 1926, Congress acted quickly to make them part of bills that authorized the restructuring of the military air forces. Not only was the Naval Air Corps permanently established, but a five-year, 1,000-plane program was approved. Also, the experimental test and repair facilities at Naval Air Station Norfolk that Bellinger had taken command of in 1918 were firmly established.

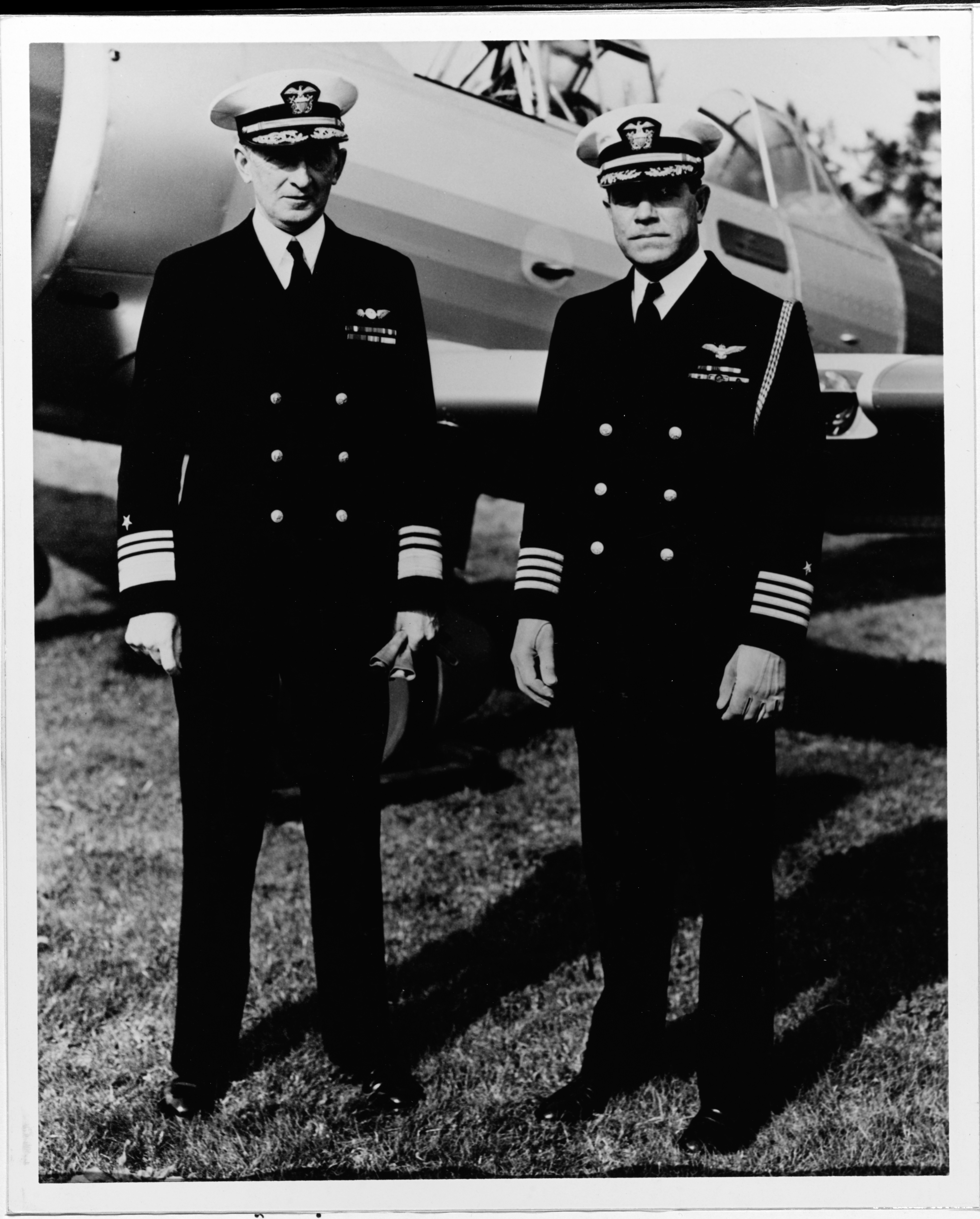
Captain Bellinger (right) as Aide to Vice admiral Frederick J. Horne, Commander, Aircraft, Battle Force in June 1937.

Bellinger was appointed Aide and Fleet Aviation Officer on the staff of the Commander-in-Chief, Battle Fleet under Admiral Charles F. Hughes. When Hughes was transferred to command of the United States Fleet, he took Bellinger with him as his aide. Admiral Hughes became Chief of Naval Operations in November 1927 and Bellinger followed him again, being attached to the Ship Movement Section of Hughes's office. The assignments under Hughes enabled Bellinger to influence future naval aviation policy, facilities, and ship development.

He remained in the Office of the Chief of Naval Operations until July 1928, when he was ordered to Italy for duty as assistant naval attache under Captain Forde A. Todd at the American embassy in Rome. While there, Bellinger was decorated with Order of Saints Maurice and Lazarus by the Government of Italy.

In June 1931, Bellinger returned to the United States and assumed command of aircraft tender USS Wright, where he served several years before. He commanded that vessel until July 1932, when he was transferred to command USS Langley, the first aircraft carrier of the United States Navy. While he commanded Langley, Bellinger earned admiration from his crew and future Admiral John T. Hayward described as follows: "He never got excited when they [the pilots] made rather difficult landings on the flight deck [they were required to make seven safe landings to be qualified]. You must remember, in those days, when we came to the fleet, we had never seen a carrier, let alone landed on one."

Bellinger was transferred to the Bureau of Aeronautics in Washington, D.C., in June 1933 and assumed duty as Head, Plans Division and later of the Administration Division. He served under then-Chief of the Bureau and future Chief of Naval Operations, Ernest J. King and made recommendations to the Navy's General Board that oversaw all military spending. Bellinger recommended the types of aircraft the Navy should acquire and their rate of production, the scope of new construction at shore stations, and the distribution, organization, and assignment of all aircraft squadrons and detachments. While in this capacity, Bellinger was promoted to Captain on June 30, 1935.

=== Outbreak of War in Europe ===
One year later, Bellinger was appointed Commanding officer of aircraft carrier USS Ranger, serving with the Atlantic Fleet until June 1937, when transferred to duty as Chief of Staff and Aide to Commander, Aircraft, Battle Force, and Carrier Division One, United States Fleet under Vice admiral Frederick J. Horne.

In July 1938, Bellinger was appointed commanding officer of the Naval Air Station, Norfolk, Virginia, the base he had commanded in 1917. He was responsible for the civilians who repaired, overhauled and assembled aircraft. But he also commanded and trained 44 officers and 450 enlisted men assigned to Patrol Wing Five. These planes were later used to search for German submarines from the Eastern Shore of Virginia to Wilmington, North Carolina.

Following the outbreak of War in Europe, Bellinger supervised the enlargement of his station and also recommended the location for future Naval Air Station Oceana. The aircraft under his command were used for the Neutrality Patrols within a line extending east from Boston to 65 degrees west and thence south to the 19th parallel and seaward around the Leeward and Windward Islands.

== World War II ==
=== Pearl Harbor and Midway ===
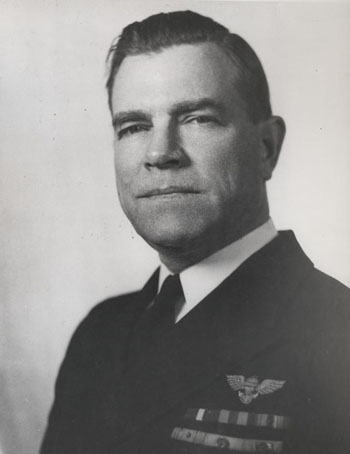
Bellinger as Rear admiral in 1941.

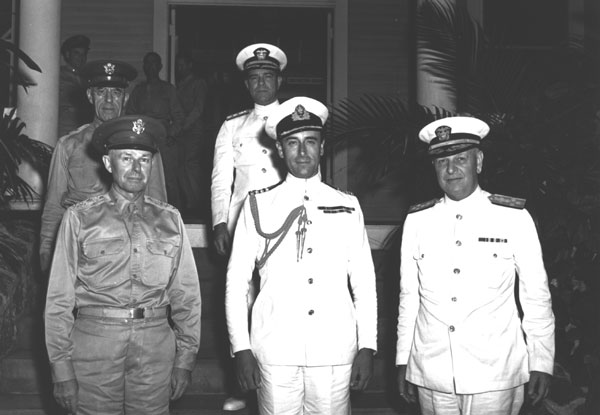
The visit of Lord Mountbatten on Hawaii in August 1941. Bellinger is in back row on the right with army general Frederick Martin. The front row from left to right: general Walter C. Short, Lord Mountbatten and Admiral Husband E. Kimmel, Commander-in-Chief, Pacific Fleet.

Bellinger was promoted to Rear admiral on December 1, 1940, and assumed command of Patrol Wing Two based in Honolulu, Hawaii. During 1941, he assumed additional duty as Commander, Aircraft, Scouting Force and together with Army Air Corps Major General Frederick L. Martin, they submitted a report in March 1941 pointing out the vulnerability of Hawaii to a dawn air raid from carriers.

At the time of Japanese Attack on Pearl Harbor on December 7, 1941, he was present on Oahu and was responsible for sending the message, "Air raid, Pearl Harbor. This is no drill", which was the first notice to the outside world of the attack. The majority of his seaplanes were destroyed in the attack, because they were parked closely together in the middle of the runways as a precaution against sabotage.

In May 1942, Bellinger was appointed Commander, Patrol Aircraft, Pacific Fleet under Admiral Chester Nimitz. He helped plan the Battle at Midway and Nimitz sent him to Washington, D.C., in July 1942 to deliver his reorganization plan for Naval aviation in the Pacific to Admiral Ernest J. King, the Chief of Naval Operations. While there, Bellinger undertook a routine physical examination at Bethesda Naval Hospital, which discovered that he had a mild heart condition. His combat career ended and he was ordered to less stressful assignment.

=== Duty with Atlantic Fleet ===
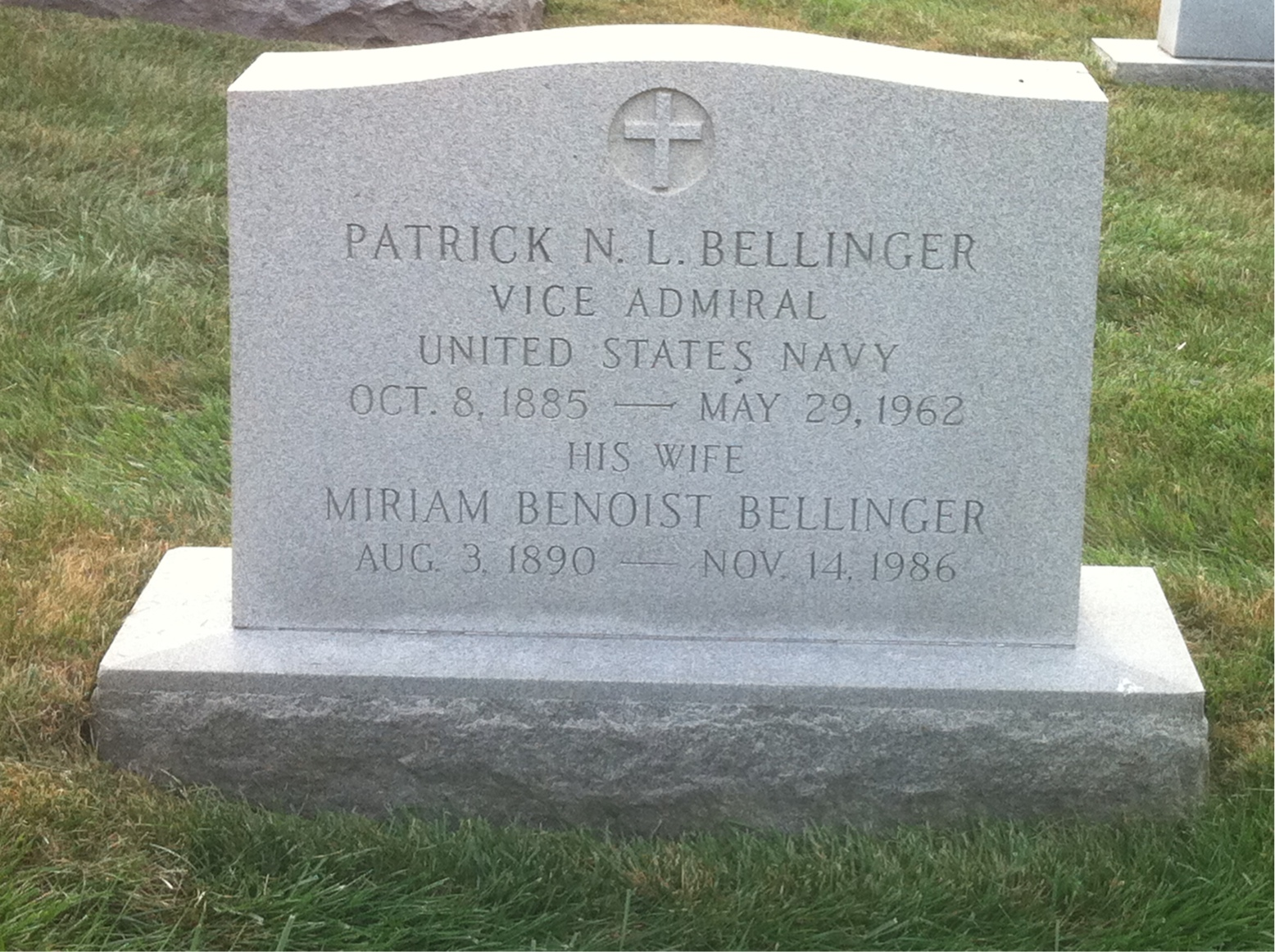
Tomb of Vice admiral Bellinger at Arlington National Cemetery.

King called Nimitz and arranged for Bellinger to be his Deputy Chief of Staff, United States Fleet. Bellinger now had the opportunity to fight for better organization of Naval aviation again. He proposed to King to create a new position of Deputy Chief of Naval Operations for Air and following the presidential approval, King ask Bellinger who he would recommend for the position. He suggested Rear admiral Alva D. Bernhard, who served as Commander, Naval Air Forces Atlantic at the time. King agreed and Bellinger assumed Bernhard's former position in March 1943.

The major problem of the Atlantic Fleet were German U-boats, which threatened allied supply convoys and sunk more than 5.7 million tons of merchant shipping. Bellinger established Anti-Submarine Warfare Detachment that taught pilots the latest Anti-Submarine Warfare tactics, tested new devices, and equipped planes with a microwave search radar. He also created Combat Information Centers and Fighter Director Officer Teams aboard his carriers. Bellinger was promoted to the rank of Vice admiral on October 5, 1943.

He remained in that capacity until February 1946, when he reported for duty on the General Board of the Navy, the advisory board for strategy and planning. Bellinger also testified before the Roberts Commissions convened to investigate the facts surrounding the Japanese attack on Pearl Harbor.

Bellinger was relieved of all active duties on July 7, 1947, and retired on October 1 that year, completing forty years of active service. For his service with the Atlantic Fleet, Bellinger was decorated with the Navy Distinguished Service Medal. The Allies bestowed him with Order of the British Empire by King George VI; and Legion of Honour and Croix de guerre 1939–1945 with Palm by General Charles de Gaulle for his efforts during the securing of supply convoys and battle with enemy submarines.

== Retirement ==
Following his retirement from the Navy, Bellinger retired to his home, "Earlhurst" in Covington, Virginia, and worked for ten years as President of Craig-Botetourt Electric Corporation. He was then involved in farming and was active in the local retired officer groups until his death. In April 1955, the two-mile long road at Naval Air Station, Norfolk was renamed from East Field Boulevard to Bellinger Boulevard. Bellinger was also a member of the Early Birds of Aviation.

Vice admiral Patrick N. L. Bellinger died following a series of heart attacks on May 30, 1962, aged 76 at Clifton Forge, Virginia. He was buried with full military honors at Arlington National Cemetery, Virginia. Bellinger was married twice: his first wife Elsie McKeown died of pneumonia in 1920 and he then married Miriam Benoist (1890–1986), with whom he had four children.

In 1981, he was chosen as one of the first twelve pioneer naval aviators to be admitted to the Naval Aviation Hall of Honor at the Naval Aviation Museum in Pensacola, Florida.

== Awards and decorations ==
Here is the ribbon bar of Vice admiral Bellinger:

Naval Aviator Badge
1st Row	Navy Cross		Navy Distinguished Service Medal
2nd Row	Mexican Service Medal	World War I Victory Medal	American Defense Service Medal with Fleet Clasp
3rd Row	Asiatic-Pacific Campaign Medal with two 3/16 inch service stars	American Campaign Medal	European-African-Middle Eastern Campaign Medal
4th Row	World War II Victory Medal	Officer of the Order of Saints Maurice and Lazarus (Italy)	Commander of the Order of the Tower and Sword (Portugal)
5th Row	Commander of the Order of the British Empire	Officer of the Legion of Honour (France)	French Croix de guerre 1939–1945 with Palm

== See also ==
- Battle of the Atlantic

Military offices
Preceded by Alva D. Bernhard	Commander, Naval Air Force Atlantic; March 1943 – February 1946	Succeeded by Gerald F. Bogan
