= Dorothea Benton Frank =

American novelist (1951–2019)

- Born: Dorothea Olivia Benton; September 12, 1951; Sullivan's Island, South Carolina, U.S.
- Died: September 2, 2019 (aged 67); New York City, U.S.
- Occupation: Novelist
- Spouse: Peter Frank
- Children: two
- Website: www.dotfrank.com

Dorothea Olivia Benton Frank (September 12, 1951 – September 2, 2019) was a best-selling American novelist. Her novels, including Porch Lights and By Invitation Only, are set in South Carolina.

== Biography ==
Dorothea Benton Frank was born and grew up on Sullivan's Island in South Carolina. She attended Bishop England High School in Charleston, and then General William Moultrie High School, from where she graduated in 1969. She went on to become a graduate of the Fashion Institute of America in Atlanta, Georgia, in 1972. She died in Manhattan of complications from myelodysplastic syndrome on September 2, 2019, at the age of 67.

Frank's writing career started because she wanted to buy the family house on Sullivan's Island after her mother died in 1993. Her husband did not want to buy it, so she said she would write a book and use the proceeds to buy the house. She didn't manage to buy the family home, but did buy another home on Sullivan's Island with money she earned from writing.

“I went to my husband and said, ‘I want to buy Momma’s house and keep it in the family.’ Peter said, ‘How much is it?’ I said $180,000. I only needed $149,000 and he said no. I asked him why and he said, ‘If you think I'm going to spend the rest of my life sitting on a front porch listening to all your relatives tell the same stories over and over till they fall off the porch, I'm not going to do it.’ ” Ms. Frank was livid. “I said: ‘O.K. Well, I’ve got news for you, Bubba. I’m going to write a book and I’m going to sell a million copies and I’m going to buy Momma’s house back. And you can’t come in.’ He said, ‘Let’s see you do it.’ ”

== Works ==
=== Lowcountry Tales series ===
- Sullivan's Island: A Low Country Tale, Jove Berkley Publishing Group, 1999, ISBN 978-0739408377
- Plantation, Jove Books, 2001, ISBN 978-0739417034
- Isle of Palms: A Lowcountry Tale, Thorndike Press, 2003, ISBN 978-0786258765
- Shem Creek: A Lowcountry Tale, Berkley Hardcover, 2004, ISBN 978-0425196083
- Pawleys Island: A Lowcountry Tale, Berkley Books, 2005, ISBN 978-0425202715
- Return to Sullivan's Island (Lowcountry Tales), William Morrow, 2009, ISBN 978-0061438455
- Lowcountry Summer, William Morrow, 2010, ISBN 978-0061961175
- Folly Beach: A Lowcountry Tale, William Morrow, 2011 ISBN 978-0061961274
- The Hurricane Sisters, William Morrow, 2014, ISBN 978-0062132529
- Same Beach, Next Year, William Morrow, 2017, ISBN 978-0062390783

=== Novels ===
- Full of Grace, William Morrow, 2006, ISBN 978-0060892357
- The Land of Mango Sunsets, William Morrow, 2007, ISBN 978-0739484654
- Bulls Island, William Morrow, 2008, ISBN 978-0061438431
- The Christmas Pearl, William Morrow, 2008, ISBN 978-0739488553
- Porch Lights, William Morrow, 2012, ISBN 978-0061961298
- The Last Original Wife, William Morrow, 2013, ISBN 978-0062132468
- All the Single Ladies, William Morrow, 2015, ISBN 978-0062132567
- All Summer Long, William Morrow, 2016, ISBN 978-0062390752
- By Invitation Only, William Morrow, 2018, ISBN 978-0062390820
- Queen Bee, William Morrow, 2019, ISBN 978-0062959065
