= John England (bishop) =

1st Roman Catholic Bishop of Charleston, South Carolina

His Excellency. The Most Reverend John England
- Bishop of Charleston
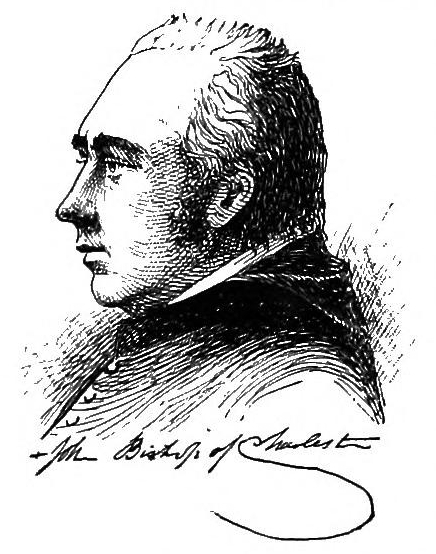
- Church: Roman Catholic Church
- See: Charleston
- In office: September 21, 1820– April 11, 1842
- Successor: Ignatius A. Reynolds

Orders
- Ordination: October 10, 1809
- Consecration: September 21, 1820 by John Murphy

Personal details
- Born: September 23, 1786 Cork, Ireland
- Died: April 11, 1842 (aged 55) Charleston, South Carolina, U.S.
- Education: Theological College of Carlow
- Motto: Pro religioni (For religion)

John England (September 23, 1786, in Cork, Ireland – April 11, 1842 in Charleston, South Carolina) was an Irish-born American prelate of the Catholic Church. He served as the first bishop of Charleston, leading a diocese that then covered three Southern states. England previously served as a priest in Cork, Ireland, where he was active in the movement for Catholic emancipation in the British Isles. As bishop in Charleston, he ministered to and provided education for many free and enslaved African-Americans.

== Life in Ireland ==
=== Early life ===
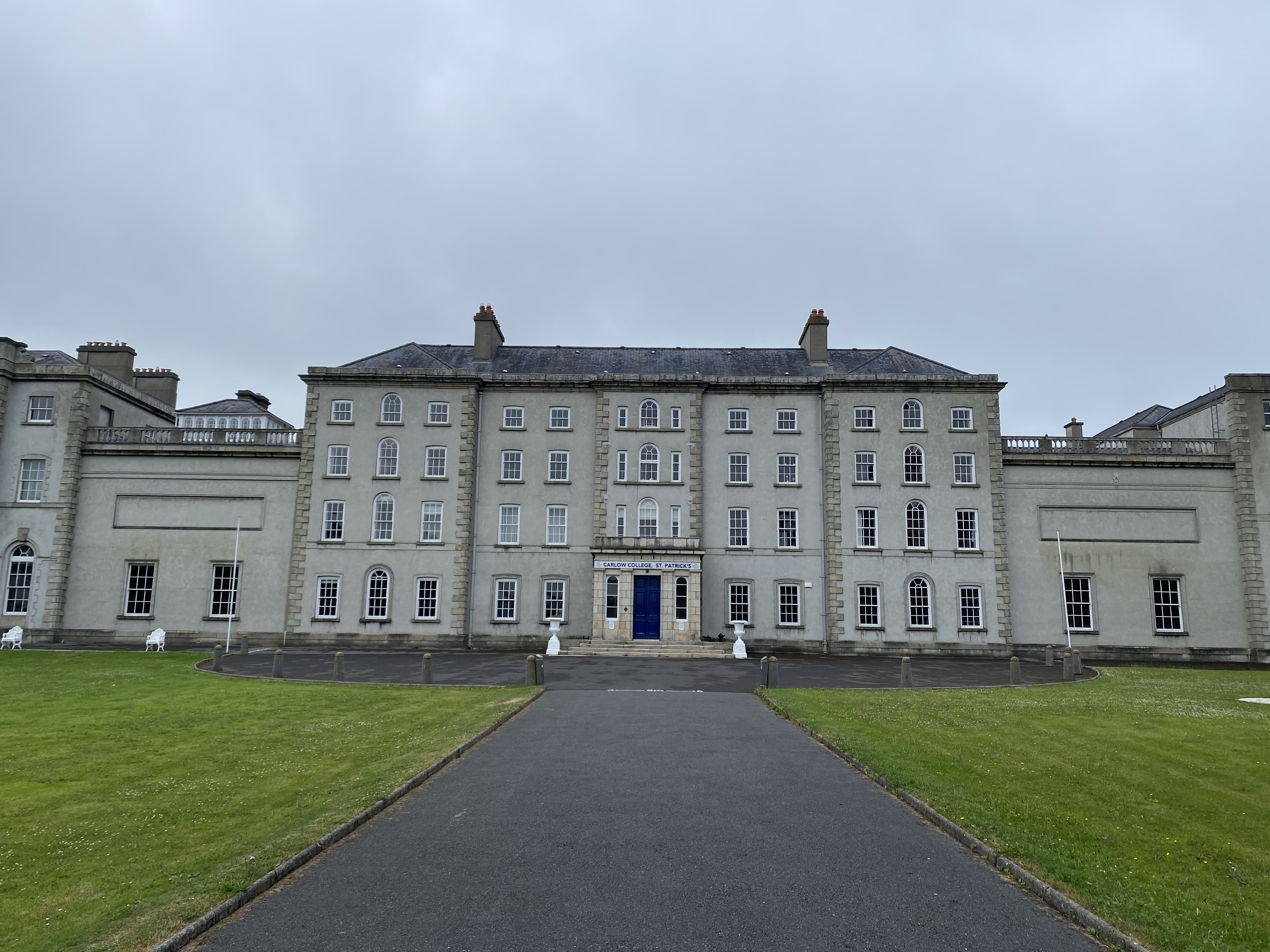
St. Patrick's, Carlow College, Carlow, Ireland (2021)

John England was born on September 23, 1786, in Cork, Ireland. As a child, he attended a private school run by a Protestant teacher, who referred to him as "the little Papist". When he was older, England pursued a law career, studying with a barrister for two years. Deciding to prepare for the priesthood, England entered the Theological College of Carlow in Carlow, Ireland on August 31, 1803.

At age 19, in his second year at Carlow, England began delivering catechetical instructions to children in the parish chapel, but adults soon started attending. He also started preaching to the soldiers of the Cork militia. After leaving Carlow, England established a women's reformatory, which led to the concepts behind the Presentation Sisters. He established schools for poor boys and girls. Out of these schools grew the Presentation Convent. Soon the Bishop of Carlow was having him deliver moral lectures during Lent at the Cathedral of the Assumption in Carlow. In 1808, while England was still in seminary, Bishop Francis Moylan of Cork appointed him as director of the Theological School at Cork.

=== Priesthood ===
==== Prison ministry ====
England was ordained a priest for the Diocese of Cork in Cork, October 10, 1809, by Bishop Francis Moylan. After his ordination, England was appointed lecturer at the North Chapel in County Cork and chaplain of prisons. At one point, England confronted a condemned prisoner 30 minutes before his execution, saying "Stop, sir. You shall not go to Hell for half hour yet." England then persuaded the man to confess his sins before dying.

England was a popular preacher, drawing large crowds to his meetings. Pending the opening of the Magdalen Asylum, a workhouse for single women, he supported and ministered to many applicants.

==== Activism ====
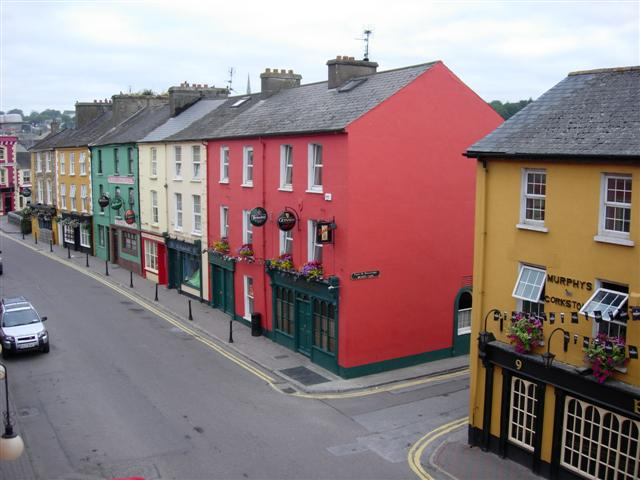
Bandon, Ireland (2006)

In 1809, England published the "Religious Repertory" and established a circulating library in St. Mary Parish in Shandon, Ireland. He purchased the Cork Mercantile Advertiser, which he used to condemn the treatment of prison inmates. During the 1812 British general election, he maintained that "in vindicating the political rights of his countrymen, he was but asserting their liberty of conscience". Also in 1812, England was appointed president of the new diocesan College of St. Mary, where he taught theology.

In 1814, England vigorously assailed the Royal veto of the appointment of bishops law. He frequently called for the abolition of discriminatory laws against Catholics in the British Isles, which eventually culminated in Catholic emancipation. To help this cause he founded "The Chronicle" which he edited until leaving Ireland.

in 1817, England was appointed as pastor of the parish in Bandon in County Cork. Bigotry against Catholics was so strong there that an inscription over the city gates read: "Enter here Turk Jew or Atheist, Every man except a Papist". At one point, he escaped an assassination attempt while visiting a dying boy late at night. Over the next several years, England worked to reconcile Protestants and Catholics in Brandon. By this time, the church began considering England for appointment as a bishop. However, he made it clear that he would not accept an appointment in any part of the British Empire, including Ireland.

== Bishop of Charleston ==
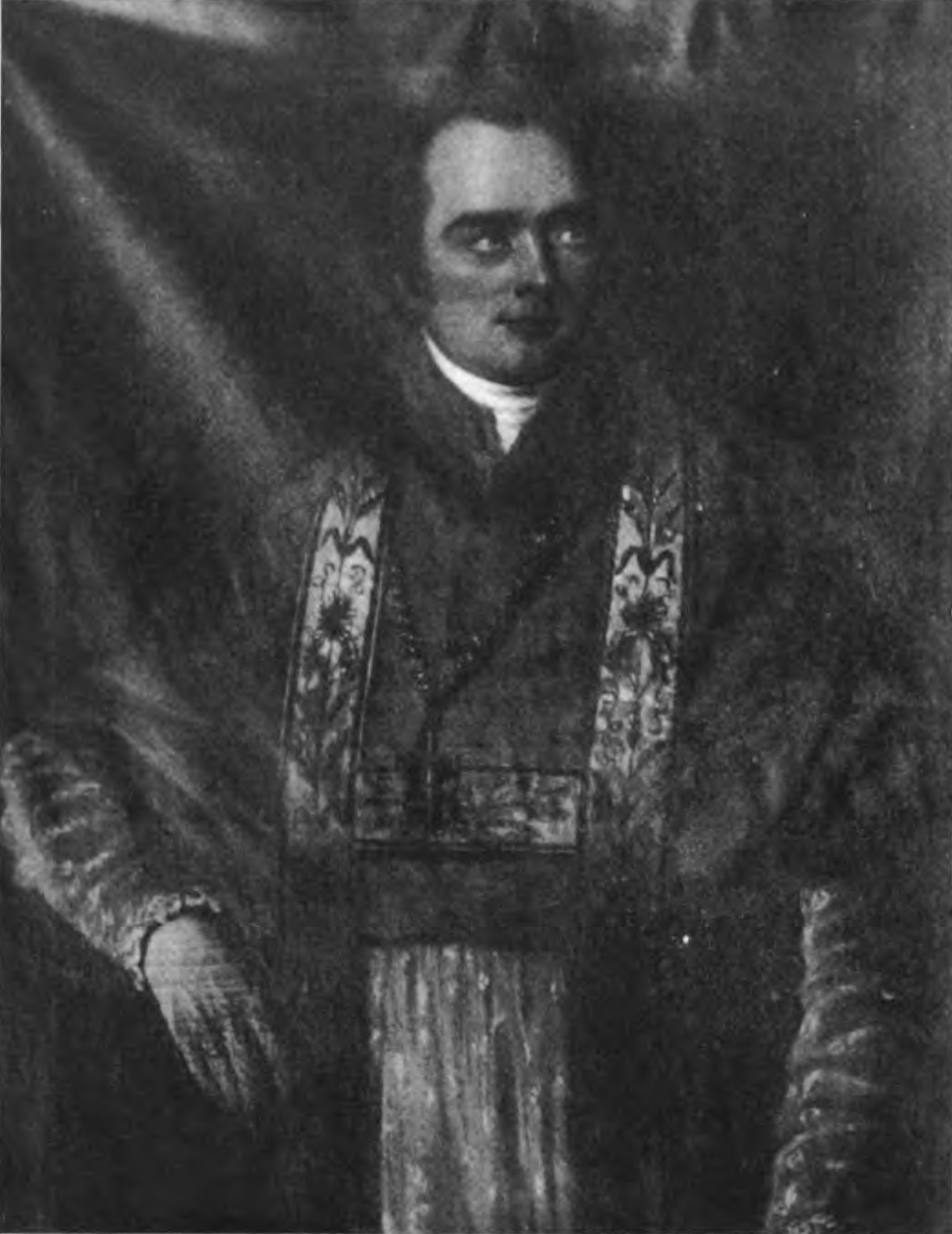
Bishop England (pre-1914)

=== 1820s ===
==== Arrival in diocese ====
England was consecrated in Cork as bishop of the Diocese of Charleston in the United States on September 21, 1820. The ceremony was held in St. Finbar's Church in Cork by Bishop John Murphy, with Bishop Patrick Kelly serving as co-consecrator. At the end of the ceremony, England refused to take the customary oath of allegiance to the British Crown, declaring his intention to become an American citizen.

On October 20, 1820, England and his youngest sister sailed from Belfast, arriving in Charleston on December 30, 1820. The day after his arrival, England took charge of the diocese and almost immediately issued a pastoral letter.

The new diocese consisted of the three states of South Carolina, North Carolina, and Georgia. The Catholic population of Charleston was mainly composed of poor immigrants from Ireland and refugees from the island of Hispaniola with their servants. The majority Protestant population in the region was unfavorable, if not antagonistic, to the growth of Catholicism there. When the local newspapers refused to publish England's sermons, he was forced to publish them in paid advertisements.

==== Travels in diocese ====
Soon after his arrival in the United States, England starting traveling through his large diocese to meet with his parishioners. During his first years in the diocese, he traveled to Savannah and Augusta in Georgia and Columbia in South Carolina. He spoke with African-Americans, Cherokees, Catholics who married non-Catholics. and people who had left the Catholic church. When in Charleston, England preached at least twice every Sunday and delivered lectures on special occasions.

In politics, England successfully advocated before the Legislature of South Carolina the granting of a charter for his diocesan corporation, which had been strongly opposed through the machinations of the disaffected trustees. England was instrumental in the founding of an Anti-Dueling Association.

==== Civic affairs ====
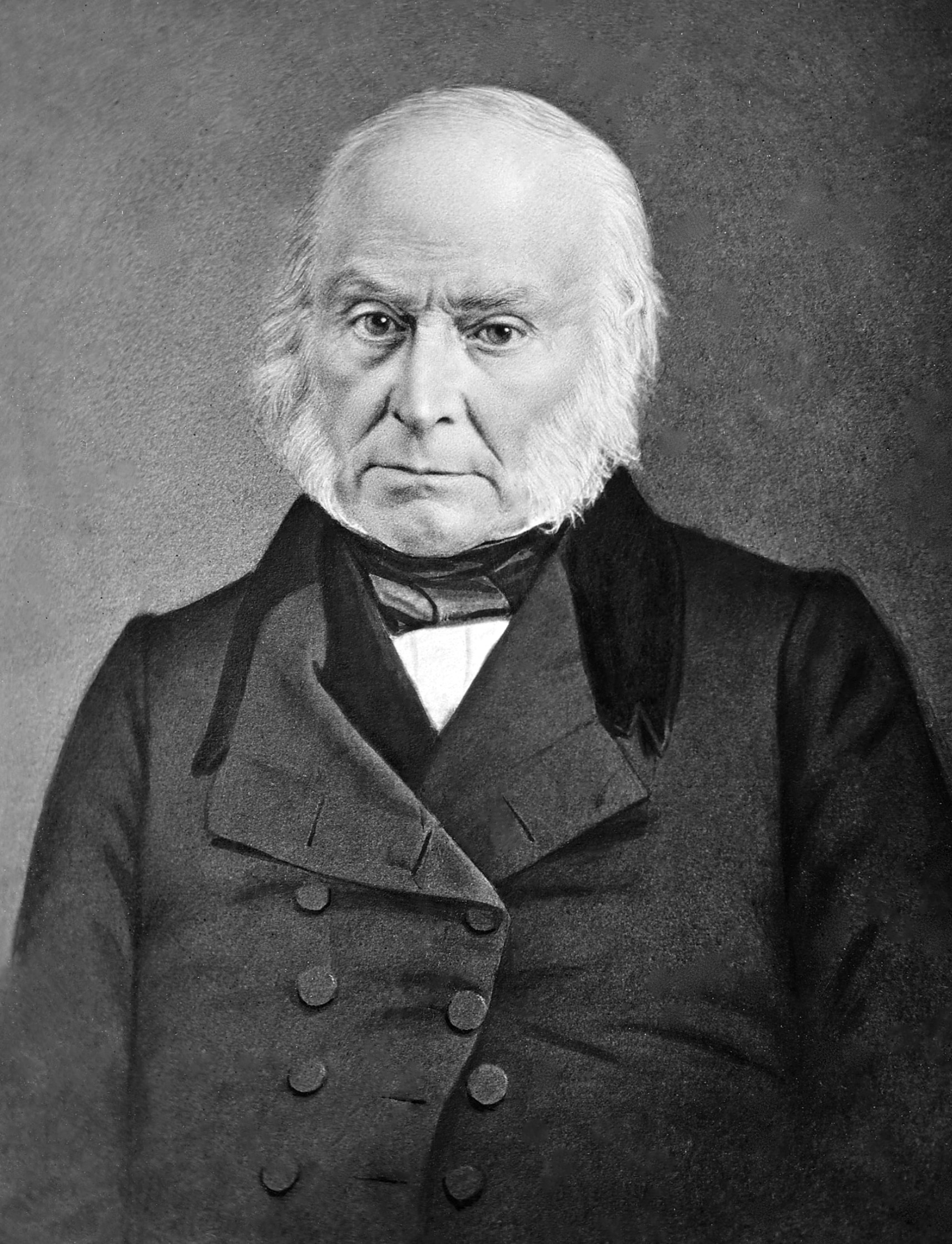
U.S. President John Quincy Adams (pre-1848)

In 1822, England promoted the establishment of a book society in each congregation to encourage literacy and education. The same year, he started the "United States Catholic Miscellany", the first distinctly Catholic newspaper in the United States. He reached out to civic leaders, both Catholic and non-Catholic. In one occasion, the US Catholic Miscellany was the center of a public exchange between England and the managers of the Protestant-run Charleston Orphan House after they denied England's request to permit Catholic priests to come to the orphanage regularly and catechize children at the request of one parent. England expressed concern that children’s religious rights were being violated and addressed the Orphan House directly in a publicized entry: "What would you think of a proposal on my part requiring you to give up the religious instruction of the children of Protestants to Roman Catholics? This Protestant-Catholic confrontation prompted England to bring a congregation of nuns to Charleston to care for Catholic orphans in 1830, an initiative that later led to the opening of a Catholic orphanage in 1841.

In 1826, England became the first Catholic bishop to address the House of Representatives in Washington, D.C., with President John Quincy Adams in the audience. In his speech, England strongly denied that the Catholic Church was intolerant of other denominations. Regarding the control of Catholic voters by the church hierarchy, he stated:

I would not allow to the Pope or any bishop of our church the smallest interference with the humblest vote at our most insignificant balloting box.

==== First Provincial Council and Constitution ====
England played a prominent role in convening the 1829 First Provincial Council of Baltimore, a gathering of bishops and clergy from across the United States. The American bishops were struggling both financially and theologically. England saw the value of their meeting to face challenges as a group.

England also wrote a constitution for his diocese that defined its relationships to civil and canon law. It was incorporated by the state and adopted by the several congregations. He also organized conventions of representative clergy and laity in the three states in his diocese to meet annually.

=== 1830s ===
==== Sisters of Our Lady of Mercy ====
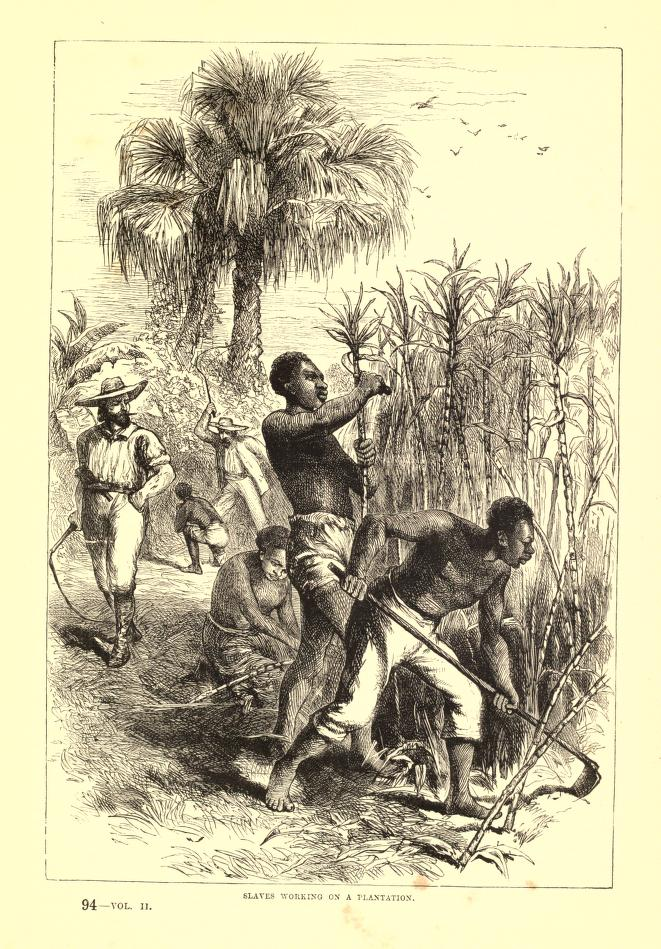
Enslaved people working on a sugar plantation in the Southern States (1877)

In 1830, England founded the Sisters of Our Lady of Mercy in Charleston. Its purpose was:

"...to educate females of the middling class of society; also to have a school for free colored girls, and to give religious instruction to female slaves; they will also devote themselves to the service of the sick".

England modeled the order on the Presentation Sisters in Ireland. His sister, Mary Charles England, was superior of the Presentation Convent in Cork. He tried to bring her to Charleston to train the new congregation, but Bishop Murphy in Cork would not permit it, citing her age. England opened a school for African-America girls in Charleston in 1831 and held a synod of the clergy on November 21, 1831.

==== Philosophical and Classical Seminary ====
Experiencing a shortage of priests in his diocese, England established in 1832 the Philosophical and Classical Seminary of Charleston. His plan was to support the seminary with income from the college. He taught courses on the classics and of theology. At its height, the seminary had 130 students. However, the college raised alarms among some Protestant clergy, who warned of papist conspiracies. These attacks eventually reduced the student body to 30. The seminary graduated many eminent laymen and priests. Chancellor Kent said "Bishop England revived classical learning in South Carolina".

England also recruited some Ursuline nuns from a convent in Black Rock, Ireland to come to Charleston the same year. In 1832, England estimated the population of the diocese at approximately 11,000, with 7,500 in South Carolina, 3,000 in Georgia, and 500 in North Carolina. At one point, the pope offered England appointment as bishop of the Diocese of Ossory in Ireland, but he declined, stating that he remained an American citizen.

England also compiled a catechism and prepared a new English edition of the missal, with an explanation of the mass. He was an active member of the Philosophical Society of Charleston, assisted in organizing the Anti-Duelling Society in Charleston to prevent dueling, and strenuously opposed Nullification in a community where it was vehemently advocated.

==== Ministering to African-Americans ====
When in Charleston, England celebrated an early mass in the cathedral for African Americans every Sunday, preaching to them at the mass and at a vesper service. He usually delivered two afternoon sermons; if unable to deliver both, he would cancel the sermon for the rich and educated in favor of one for the poor. During the cholera and yellow fever epidemics in Charleston, he joined his priests and nuns in tending to the sick. England lived a very frugal existence, often seen on the city streets wearing worn-out shoes. He frequently suffered from exhaustion and survived several serious illnesses. In 1834, England recruited a small group of Ursulines nuns from the convent at Blackrock, Cork, to come to the diocese to teach and minister. During this time, some slave owners invited England to their plantations to minister to their enslaved people.

In 1835, England established more free schools for African-American children in Charleston. That same year, anti-Catholic agitators raised a mob that raided the Charleston post office. Its intent was to attack England's schools the next day. However, when the mob arrived, they were met by Charleston's Irish Volunteers, a militia created by Irish immigrants for self-protection. Soon after this incident, England was forced to close his schools.

==== William Clancy ====
In 1835, Reverend William Clancy arrived in Charleston to serve as coadjutor bishop. In 1832, the Vatican had instructed England to travel to Haiti to serve as a papal negotiator. When England requested a coadjutor bishop to cover the diocese during his absence, the Vatican appointed Clancy. However, Clancy did not arrive in Charleston until 1835, when England's trip to Haiti had been cancelled. Clancy soon became bored and complained that there was too little work in the diocese for two bishops. England wrote to the Vatican, saying about Clancy:

He is very distinguished for his character, zeal and piety, but in one year he has wrecked that whole constitutional system of church government which has taken me years to perfect. working in the diocese.

Two year after his arrival in Charleston, Clancy was appointed vicar-general of Guiana.

==== Mob attack ====
In 1835, provoked by the American Anti-Slavery Society, an anti-Catholic mob raided the Charleston post office. The next day, the mob marched on England's school for 'children of color.' However, it was thwarted by a group of Irish volunteers, led by England, who were guarding the school. However, soon after this, when all schools for 'free blacks' were closed in Charleston, England was forced to concede, but continued the schools for mulattoes and free blacks.

To obtain financial support for his diocese, England met with prospective donors in cities and towns throughout the United States. He made four fundraising trips to Europe, visiting the United Kingdom, France and Italy. He sought funding, vestments and books from the pope, the Propaganda Fide department of the Vatican and the Leopoldine Society of Vienna.

== Death ==
In May 1841, England sailed to Europe for the last time. On the return voyage, starting in December 1841, dysentery broke out on board. England spent much of the voyage tending to sick passengers, becoming seriously ill himself. Arriving in Philadelphia, he ignored his debilitated health to preach 17 consecutive nights in that city, then four more nights in Baltimore. After reaching Charleston, England resumed his normal routine.

England never fully recovered from his illness on the ship and by late winter 1842 was bedridden. John England died on April 11, 1842, in Charleston. After his death, bells were rung from Protestant churches and flags were lowered throughout the city.

== Legacy ==
England published most of his writings in the United States Catholic Miscellany, helped by his sister. His successor, Bishop Ignatius Reynolds, collected England's writings and published them in five volumes at Baltimore, in 1849. A new edition, edited by Archbishop Sebastian Messmer of Milwaukee, was published at Cleveland, Ohio, in 1908.

- Bishop England High School, founded in Charleston in 1914, was named in England's honor.
- The Bishop John England Award is given to publications that belong to the Catholic Media Association.

== Notes ==
Catholic Church titles
Preceded by none	Bishop of Charleston; 1820–1842	Succeeded by Ignatius A. Reynolds
