= Charleston Orphan House =

First public orphanage in the United States

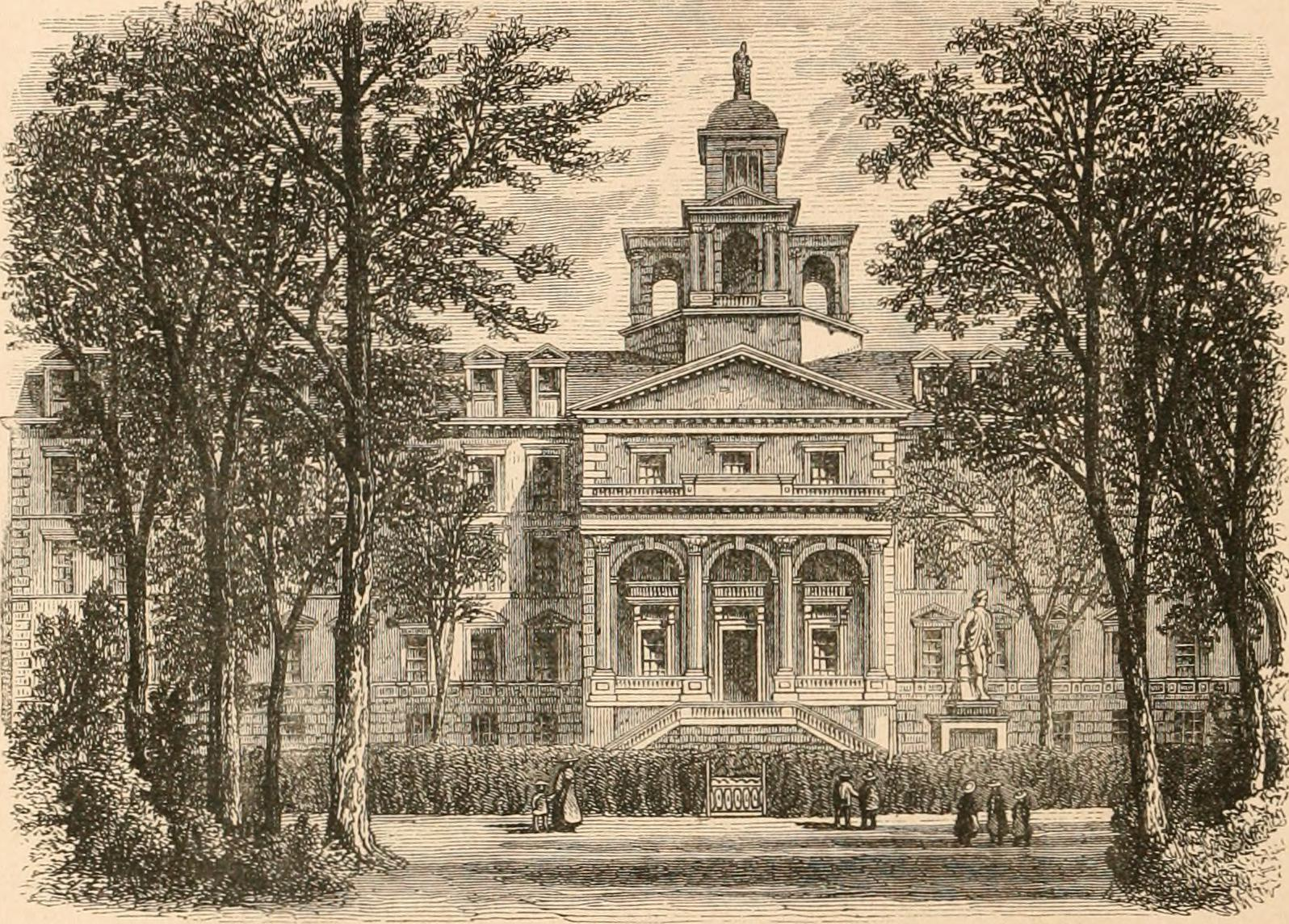
- The Orphan House — Charleston.
- Interactive map of Charleston Orphan House
- 32.78384°N 79.93700°W
- Location: Calhoun Street, Charleston, South Carolina

History
- Built: 1790
- Demolished: 1956

Charleston Orphan House, the first public orphanage in the United States, was an orphanage in Charleston, South Carolina from 1790 to 1951. Records of the Commissioners of the Charleston Orphan House are held at the Charleston County Public Library, in Charleston. The records consists of the administrative records of the Charleston Orphan House, from its founding in 1790 to its removal in 1951.

== History ==
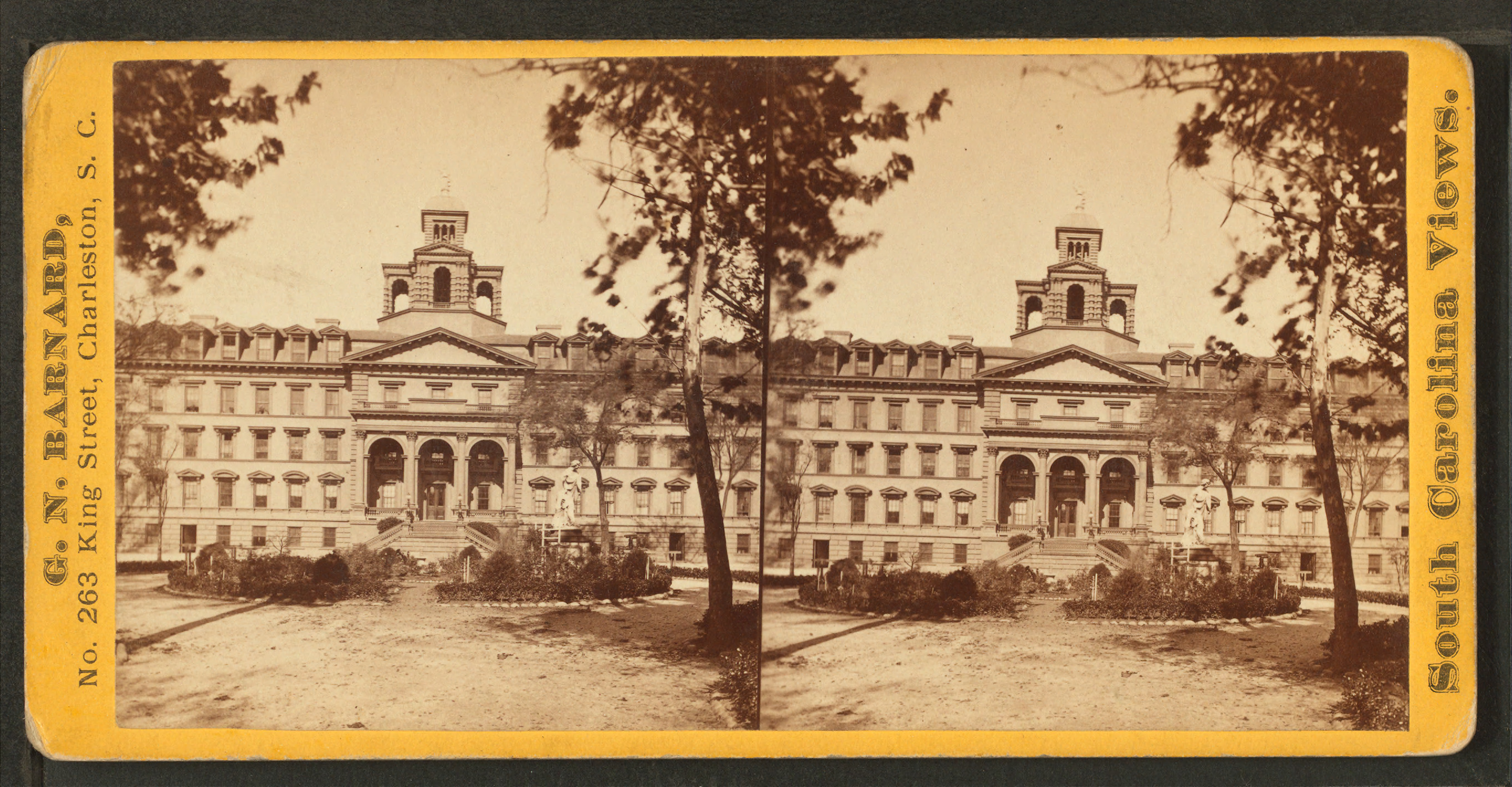
The Orphan House, 1819–1902

The Charleston Orphan House was established on October 18, 1790, by the City Council as the first municipal orphanage in the United States. Before the Orphan House was established, St. Phillip's and St. Michael's parishes provided for destitute children. They ordered men who abandoned their families to pay child support and paid women to care for young children who did not have families. When Charleston was incorporated in 1783, the city had to take on the burden of caring for these children. The city wanted to establish an orphanage as a centralized site of care to save on expenses.

The orphanage's early years was notable for its religious inclusivity. In 1791, local religious leaders from the St. Mary’s Catholic Church, Beth Elohim Synagogue, and other leading Protestant churches mobilized their congregations to help raise money for a permanent building. Notwithstanding its interfaith origins, the orphanage's daily operations was primarily Protestant, with children receiving religious instruction from a rotation of Protestant clergy. Over the years, the Charleston Orphan House grew to form one of South Carolina's earliest educational systems.

As the number of children in the orphanage grew, the decidedly Protestant manner of religious instruction prompted Catholics and Jews to found their similar institutions catering to orphans of their own faith. Jews in Charleston later formed the Hebrew Orphan Society in 1801. Four decades later, Catholics, led by Bishop John England, successfully opened Charleston’s first Catholic orphanage after a public confrontation with the Orphan House's religious policies.

The Orphan House also occupied Revolutionary War–era barracks. The council rented a house on Market Street from 1790 until construction on the orphan house building was complete in 1794. The orphanage was within Calhoun (Boundary), King, Vanderhorst, and St. Phillips Streets. On November 12, 1792, President George Washington laid the cornerstone of the first permanent Orphan House, located on the north side of Boundary Street, which is now present-day Calhoun Street. It formally opened on October 18, 1794. The campus occupied most of the block bounded by Calhoun, King, Vanderhorst, and St. Philip Streets. The Ophan House remained at this site for nearly 150 years.

By 1861, the Orphan House was staffed by 39 employees who cared for 360 children. Residents of the Orphan House were often poor white children with living parents who could not afford to care for them. Orphan House children typically received a few years of school before being hired out as apprentices, farmers, or domestic servants.

== Closing of "The Orphan House" ==
In 1948, the Orphan House was under criticism by the Child Welfare League of America. As a result, the Charleston City Council began to question its operations. Two years later in September 1951, the Charleston Orphan House officially closed and the commissioners of the Orphan House bought roughly 37 acres of a new site called Oak Grove Plantation in North Charleston.

In 1956, the Orphan House building at St. Phillip and Coming streets was torn down to construct a Sears. Twenty-two years later, the Orphan House ceased operations officially in 1978. Currently, the agency now identifies as Landmarks for Families, which still operates and serves through outreach programs.

== The Charleston Archive ==
Records of the Commissioners of the Charleston Orphan House are held at the Charleston County Public Library, in Charleston. The records consist of the administrative records of the Charleston Orphan House, from its founding in 1790 to its removal in 1951. These include thirteen series, including anniversary records (1804-1861), applications to admit and to remove children from the institution (1796-1929), commissioners’ correspondence (1792-1951), financial records (1790-1959), indenture books (1780-1949), library records (1855-1889), minutes (1790-1953), miscellaneous materials (1778-1951), physicians’ records (1862-1950), printed materials, registers, staff records, and superintendent’s weekly reports (1809-1951). The majority of the records in this archive have been microfilmed, which comprise 54 reels of microfilm. The records are available in the South Carolina Room of the Library.

== Architecture ==
Gentleman architect Gabriel Manigault designed the orphan house's chapel in 1802. Architects Jones and Lee remodeled and enlarged the building in the 1850s. The building was demolished in 1956 to build a Sears Department Store and later the College of Charleston's Joe E. Berry dormitory.

== Notable alumni ==
- Louisa Swain
- Andrew Buist Murray
- Christopher Memminger
- John C. Frémont
