= Sisters of Charity of Our Lady of Mercy =

The Sisters of Charity of Our Lady of Mercy is a Roman Catholic religious institute founded by Bishop John England of the Diocese of Charleston in South Carolina, in 1829 as the Sisters of Our Lady of Mercy. In 1949 the word "Charity" was added to the congregation's name, in order to identify it more explicitly with others that follow the Rule of Life of St. Vincent de Paul. They came to serve throughout the Eastern United States. The members of the congregation use the postnominal initials of O.L.M.

== History ==
=== Founding ===
While attending the first Provincial Council of Baltimore in the fall of 1829, England met four women of that city: sisters Mary and Honora O’Gorman, their niece, Teresa Barry (aged 15), natives of Ireland and Mary Elizabeth Burke, who all wished to live a consecrated life dedicated to serving the poor, sick, orphaned and uneducated in his diocese. England accepted their offer and had them sail with him on his return to Charleston, where they landed on the following November 23rd.

England established them formally as a religious congregation on December 8, 1829. He called the new community the Sisters of Our Lady of Mercy and patterned it after the Sisters of Charity founded by Elizabeth Bayley Seton in Emmitsburg, Maryland. They modeled their religious habit on that used by the Sisters of Emmitsburg, a black pioneer-style cap with dress and short cape.

=== Ministries ===
The Sisters quickly opened a school in their residence, which later moved to a larger site, where they established a school, orphanage and convent. They received incorporation by the State of South Carolina in 1835. They operated a number of educational and medical institutions which lasted for varying periods, including a school for the children of free blacks.

The Constitutions of the infant congregation were written by the second Bishop of Charleston, Ignatius A. Reynolds, in 1844. He based the Constitutions on those of the Sisters of Charity of Nazareth--whom he knew as a native of Kentucky--and on the simple Rule given to the Sisters by England, which was based on the Rule of Life of St. Vincent de Paul. At that time, Teresa Barry (1814-1900) was elected the first Superior General of the congregation, serving in that office until her death.

In the mid-19th century, even through the turmoil of the American Civil War, the congregation grew and expanded into the states of Georgia and North Carolina. At least eighteen Sisters provided nursing care on the battlefields and nursed prisoners of war in the prisons throughout the course of the war. Among those particularly remembered is Sister M. Xavier Dunn for her patient work in Confederate hospitals. Congress received so many testimonials to the Sisters' care, that in 1871 it voted $12,000 in reparations to the rebuild the orphanage destroyed during the siege.

As a congregation of diocesan right, the Sisters lived fully subject to the authority of the local Ordinary of the diocese in which they served. Consequently, when new dioceses were established for Savannah, Georgia, and Wilmington, North Carolina, separating those territories from the Diocese of Charleston, the Sisters living in those locations were separated from the congregation in Charleston, coming under the authority of the new local bishops.

In 1882 the Sisters opened St. Francis Xavier Hospital in Charleston, which exists today as Bon Secours St. Francis Hospital. They cared for soldiers wounded in the Spanish–American War and for yellow fever victims. The Sisters also responded to the increasing need for trained nurses by establishing the St. Francis Xavier Infirmary Training School for Nurses which opened on October 22, 1900.

The Neighborhood House has served the Charleston community since 1915 when it was established as a social service center and home nursing outreach. The soup kitchen at downtown Charleston's Neighborhood House feeds 120 per day as well as providing GED preparation. The Sisters also staffed Bishop England High School.

In the early 1930s, after maintaining for a century the black cap as worn by Mother Seton, the Sisters adopted the use of a veil. In 1949, a new set of Constitutions were approved for the congregation by the Holy See. At that time they adopted the term "Charity" as part of their name to align themselves more closely with other congregations following the Vincentian Rule, and joined the international federation uniting their presence around the world.

Due to their experience in serving to provide catechesis to rural communities, in 1947 the congregation was asked to do this work by the Bishop of Trenton, New Jersey. In 1954, they expanded their service to teaching in parochial schools.

The Sisters acquired property on James Island in 1959, to which they moved their General Motherhouse.

In 1989 the society opened an outreach center on Johns Island, near Charleston. In the wake of Hurricane Hugo, Sister Carol Wentworth established the Nun Better Roofing Company; all work was free of charge. Our Lady of Mercy Community Outreach focuses on health care, including dental and pre-natal services, and sponsors a Health and Wellness summer camp.

=== Completion ===
In the course of their General Chapter held in 2008, the Sisters came to a consensus that their reduced and aging membership would not allow for a viable future as a congregation. They chose to embark on beginning the process of shutting down their services and preparing for the care of their members in their final years, a process which has been labeled "completion" by various congregations which have taken a similar decision.

As of 2014 fifteen Sisters of Charity of Our Lady of Mercy served Charleston from the May Forrest motherhouse on James Island. As of 2015 there were fourteen members.

By 2021 there were twelve members and they made the decision to sell the property of the motherhouse to the State of South Carolina. It would be dedicated as a state park and nature preserve.

The remaining Sisters moved out the following year to take up residence at the Bishop Gadson Episcopalian Retirement Community, also on James Island, which was able to provide differing levels of care according to each Sister's need.
