= Ignatius A. Reynolds =

Catholic bishop (1798–1855)

The Most Reverend Ignatius Aloysius Reynolds
- Bishop of Charleston
- Church: Roman Catholic Church
- See: Diocese of Charleston
- In office: March 19, 1844—March 9, 1855
- Predecessor: John England
- Successor: Patrick Neeson Lynch

Orders
- Ordination: October 24, 1823 by Ambrose Maréchal
- Consecration: March 19, 1844 by John Baptist Purcell

Personal details
- Born: August 22, 1798 Bardstown, Kentucky
- Died: March 6, 1855 (aged 56) Charleston, South Carolina
- Education: St. Mary's Seminary

Ignatius Aloysius Reynolds (August 22, 1798 – March 6, 1855) was an American prelate of the Roman Catholic Church. He served as bishop of the Diocese of Charleston, covering three states in the American South, from 1844 until his death in 1855.

== Biography ==
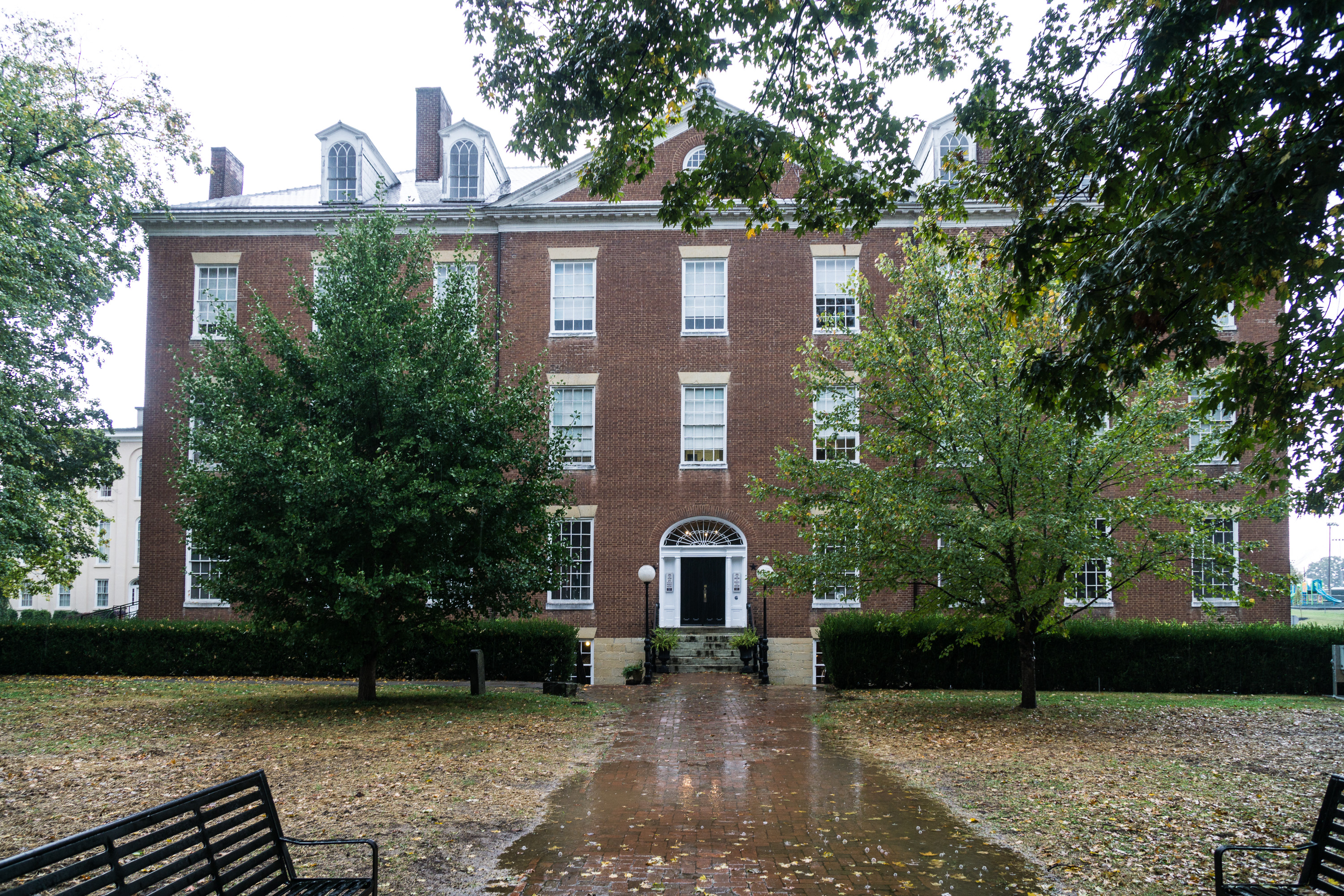
Spalding Hall in Bardstown, Kentucky. Formerly part of St. Joseph's Seminary (2016)

=== Early life ===
Ignatius Reynolds was born on August 22, 1798, in Bardstown, Kentucky, to John and Ann (née French) Reynolds. He enrolled at the theological seminary there at an early age. In December 1821, he entered St. Mary's Seminary in Baltimore, Maryland.

==== Priesthood ====
Reynolds was ordained to the priesthood for the Archdiocese of Baltimore by Archbishop Ambrose Maréchal in Baltimore on October 24, 1823.

Following his return to Kentucky, Reynolds served as president of St. Joseph's College in Bardstown until 1830, when he succeeded Reverend Francis Kenrick as professor of theology at the Bardstown seminary. He also served as rector of the Cathedral of the Assumption in Louisville, Kentucky. Reynolds later became superior of the Sisters of Charity of Nazareth, and vicar general of the diocese.

=== Bishop of Charleston ===
On November 28, 1843, Reynolds was appointed the second bishop of Charleston by Pope Gregory XVI. At that time, the diocese included the states of Georgia, South Carolina, and North Carolina. He received his episcopal consecration on March 19, 1844, from Archbishop John Purcell, with Bishops Michael O'Connor and Richard Miles serving as co-consecrators, at Saint Peter in Chains Cathedral in Cincinnati, Ohio.

During his tenure, Reynolds brought stability to the diocesan administration. He conducted visitations of the entire diocese, which then included both Carolinas and Georgia.

These areas were dominated by Episcopalians, Baptists, and Methodists; there were only about 12,000 Catholics in the diocese in 1846. Reynolds published a five-volume work on his popular predecessor, Bishop John England; erased the $14,000 diocesan debt left by England, and dedicated the Cathedral of Saint John and Saint Finbar in Charleston in April 1854.

=== Death and legacy ===
Reynolds died on March 6, 1855, at age 56 in Charleston.

Catholic Church titles
Preceded by John England	Bishop of Charleston; 1844–1855	Succeeded by Patrick Neeson Lynch
