= Timeline of Charleston, South Carolina =

City history timeline

Coordinates: 32.783333°N 79.933333°W

The following is a timeline of the history of Charleston, South Carolina, USA.

== 18th–19th centuries ==
- 1680 – Settlement of English immigrants, mostly from Barbados, relocates from Albemarle Point to site of future Charles Town.
- 1681 – St. Philip's Episcopal Church founded.
- 1699 - Hurricane and epidemic.
- 1708 – African slaves comprise majority of population in the colony; blacks make up majority of population in the city and state until the early 20th century
- 1719 – Charles Town renamed "Charlestown" (approximate date).
- 1729 – St. Andrew's Society founded.
- 1732 – South Carolina Gazette newspaper begins publication.
- 1734 – South Carolina Jockey Club constituted.
- 1736 – Dock Street Theatre opens.
- 1737 – South-Carolina Society founded.
- 1739 – Stono Rebellion of slaves occurs near Charleston.
- 1740 – Fire.
- 1743 – Armory built.
- 1745 – Town gate rebuilt.
- 1748 – Charleston Library Society organized.
- 1750 – Congregation Kahal Kadosh Beth Elohim founded.
- 1752 – September: Hurricane.
- 1761 – St. Michael's church built.
- 1765
  - Resistance to British Stamp Act 1765.
  - John Bartlam pottery in operation near Charleston.
- 1766
  - St. Cecilia Society formed.
  - German Friendly Society founded.
- 1769 – Town becomes part of Charleston District.
- 1770
  - College of Charleston founded.
  - Population: 11,000.
- 1771 – Royal Exchange built.
- 1773 – Museum founded by the Charleston Library Society.
- 1774 – Charleston Tea Party protest.
- 1780 – Siege of Charleston.
- 1782 – December 14: British occupation ends.
- 1783
  - Town renamed "Charleston."
  - Charter received.
  - Richard Hutson becomes mayor.
  - City Guard organized.
- 1784 – Scotch Presbyterian church incorporated.
- 1786
  - March: State capital moves from Charleston to Columbia.
  - South Carolina Golf Club founded.
- 1788 – Charleston becomes part of the new US state of South Carolina.
- 1789 – Medical Society of South Carolina founded.
- 1790
  - College of Charleston opens.
  - Population: 16,359.
  - Brown Fellowship Society founded.
- 1791 – Roman Catholic Church of Charleston incorporated.
- 1792
  - Charleston Orphan Asylum founded.
  - Washington Race Course opens.
- 1793 – Charleston Theatre founded.
- 1794 – Charleston Mechanic Society founded.
- 1797 – South Carolina Weekly Museum (magazine) begins publication.
- 1798 – Bank of South Carolina established.
- 1799 – Yellow fever outbreak.
- 1800
  - Santee Canal (Columbia-Charleston) built.
  - Population: 18,824.
  - Charleston has largest Jewish population of any city in the US.

== 19th century ==
=== 1800s–1850s ===
- 1801 – Hibernian Society founded.
- 1803 – Courier newspaper begins publication.
- 1806 – Franklin Library Society founded.
- 1807 – Washington Light Infantry founded.
- 1810
  - Castle Pinckney built.
  - Population: 24,711.
- 1813
  - Literary and Philosophical Society of South Carolina founded.
  - Ladies Benevolent Society founded.
- 1815 – Religious Tract Society of Charleston organized.
- 1816 – Emanuel African Methodist Episcopal Church founded.
- 1819
  - Charleston Mercury newspaper begins publication.
  - New England Society of Charleston organized.
  - Siegling Music House founded.
- 1820
  - Roman Catholic Diocese of Charleston established.
  - Population: 24,780.
- 1822 – Denmark Vesey's alleged rebellion of slaves thwarted.
- 1823
  - Charleston Port Society founded.
  - Medical College of South Carolina incorporated.
- 1824
  - Apprentices' Library Society incorporated.
  - Charleston Museum opens.
- 1830 – Population: 30,289.
- 1832/33 - Nullification crisis centred in the town.
- 1833 – Charleston-Hamburg railroad begins operating.
- 1839
  - Charleston Hotel built.
  - St. Mary's Roman Catholic Church built.
- 1840 – Population: 29,261.
- 1841
  - Market Hall built.
  - Charleston Arsenal built.
- 1843 – South Carolina Military Academy opens.
- 1844 - Huguenot Church built.
- 1847 – Shearith Israel synagogue built.
- 1849 – South Carolina Institute for the Promotion of Art, Mechanical Ingenuity, and Industry organized; annual Fair begins.
- 1850
  - Magnolia Cemetery built.
  - Roper Hospital established.
  - Population: 42,985.
- 1852 – Museum founded by the College of Charleston.
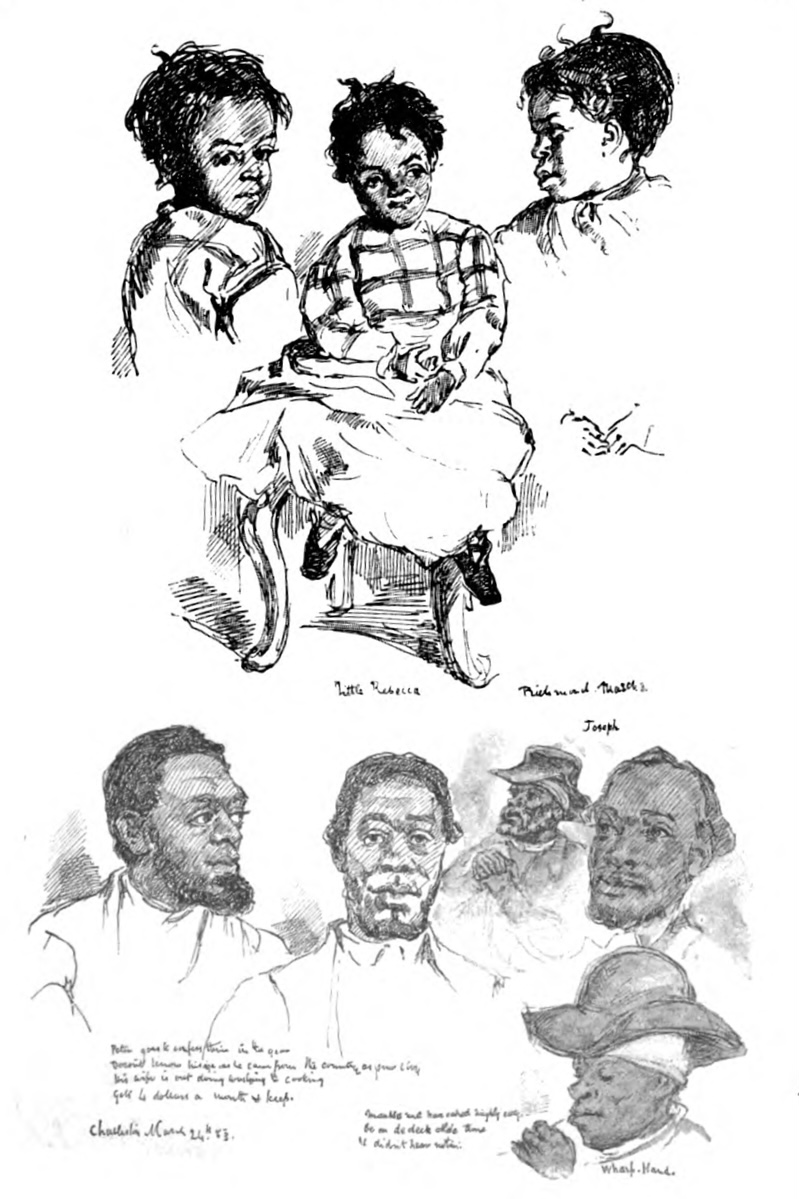
  Sketches made in Charleston, South Carolina by artist Eyre Crowe in March 1853
- 1853 – Elliott Society of Natural History established.
- 1854
  - Young Men's Christian Association of Charleston and B'rith Shalom congregation established.
  - Old Bethel United Methodist Church rebuilt.
  - Cathedral of Saint John and Saint Finbar consecrated.
  - Hurricane and epidemic.
- 1855 – South Carolina Historical Society founded.
- 1856 – Ryan's Mart slave market established.
- 1858 – Carolina Art Association established.
- 1859 – Charleston Marine School opens.

=== 1860s–1890s ===
- 1860
  - April: Democratic National Convention held in city.
  - December: Popular outcry for secession from the Union.
  - Population: 40,522.
- 1861
  - January 2: State troops occupy Fort Johnson on James Island.
  - January 9 – Citadel cadets fire on Union ship Star of the West.
  - April: Battle of Fort Sumter.
  - Population: 48,409.
  - Floating Battery of Charleston Harbor built.
  - Confederate Naval Sailor and Marines' Cemetery built.
- 1862
  - May 13: Robert Smalls commandeers Confederate ship CSS Planter in Charleston Harbour.
  - June 16: Battle of James Island.
- 1863
  - July–September 7: Siege of Charleston Harbor.
  - July 11: First Battle of Fort Wagner.
  - July 18: Second Battle of Fort Wagner.
  - September 8: Second Battle of Fort Sumter.
- 1864 – February 17: Sinking of USS Housatonic in Charleston Harbor.
- 1865
  - Union troops occupy city.
  - In a ceremony with thousands of out-of-town spectators, the Fort Sumter Flag was raised again over Fort Sumter.
  - Daily News begins publication.
  - St. Mark's Episcopal Church and Avery Normal Institute established.
  - Shaw School opens.
  - State Colored People's Convention held in city.
- 1866
  - Colored YMCA established.Negro Yearbook
  - Furchgott dry goods store in business.
- 1867 – Porter Military Academy formed.
- 1868 – January 14: State constitutional convention held in Charleston.
- 1869 – Carolina Rifle Club organized.
- 1870
  - Charleston Female Seminary established.
  - Savannah and Charleston Railroad reopened.
  - Magnolia Gardens opens.
  - Population: 48,956.
- 1872 – St. Matthew's German Evangelical Lutheran Church built.
- 1879 – United States Custom House built.
- 1880 – Population: 49,984.
- 1882 – City of Charleston Fire Department and Mount Zion African Methodist Episcopal Church established.
- 1883 – Samuel Dibble becomes U.S. representative for South Carolina's 1st congressional district.
- 1884 – Robert Smalls becomes U.S. representative for South Carolina's 7th congressional district.
- 1886 – August 31: The 6.9–7.3 M_{w} Charleston earthquake shakes South Carolina with a maximum Mercalli intensity of X (Extreme). Sixty people were killed and damage totalled $5–6 million in the region.
- 1889 – William Enston Homes built.
- 1890
  - East Shore Terminal Company formed.
  - Population: 54,955.
- 1891 – Central Baptist Church built.
- 1893 – August: 1893 Charleston Hurricane.
- 1895 – Century Club for women organized.
- 1896 – United States Post Office and Courthouse built.
- 1899 – Charleston City Federation of Women's Clubs organized.
- 1900 – Population: 55,807.

== 20th century ==
- 1901/2 – South Carolina Inter-State and West Indian Exposition opens.
- 1903 – Charleston Terminal Company created.
- 1906 – Hampton Park created.
- 1907
  - Union Station built.
  - Cathedral of Saint John the Baptist opens.
- 1908 – Gaud School established.
- 1909– Ashley Hall established
- 1910 – Population: 58,833.
- 1911 – People's Office Building constructed.
- 1912
  - Carolina Arts and Crafts incorporated.
  - Read Brothers store established.
- 1913 – Charleston Library Society building constructed.
- 1917 – National Association for the Advancement of Colored People Charleston branch established.
- 1918 – Garden Theatre built.
- 1919 — Charleston riot of 1919
- 1920
  - Society for the Preservation of Old Dwellings founded.
  - Lincoln Theatre opens.
- 1927 – Gloria Theatre opens.
- 1929 – John P. Grace Memorial Bridge opens.
- 1930
  - Charleston County Library established.
  - WCSC radio begins broadcasting.
- 1931 – Footlight Players theatre group formed.
- 1937 – Dock Street Theatre opens.
- 1938 – September 20: Tornado.
- 1939 – WTMA radio begins broadcasting.
- 1940 – August: 1940 South Carolina hurricane.
- 1942 – American Theater opens.
- 1945 – 1945–1946 Charleston Cigar Factory strike; singing of We Shall Overcome.Introduction · Charleston's Cigar Factory Strike, 1945-1946 · Lowcountry Digital History InitiativeThe Surprising History of Guy Carawan's Civil-Rights Anthem, "We Shall Overcome"
- 1947 – Historic Charleston Foundation established.
- 1949 – Johnson Hagood Stadium opens.
- 1950 – Ashley Theatre opens.
- 1951 – The Links Charleston chapter founded.
- 1953 – WCSC-TV (television) begins broadcasting.
- 1954 – WUSN-TV (television) begins broadcasting.
- 1957 – Fraser Elementary School opens.
- 1959 – J. Palmer Gaillard Jr. becomes mayor.
- 1960 - April 1 - Kress Lunch Counter Sit-In. Twenty-four students from Burke High School, the main African American High School downtown, staged a sit-in protest at the Kress Lunch Counter on King Street.
- 1964 – Porter-Gaud School formed.
- 1966 – New Cooper River Bridge opens.
- 1968
  - Pinehaven Cinema and Gateway Drive-In cinema open.
  - The College of Charleston becomes a public college marking the beginning of the transition of the school from being the multi-hundred, private, school it had traditionally been to being the around ten thousand student school it leveled out at in the early 2000s.
- 1969 – March 20: Charleston Hospital Strike begins.
- 1970
  - Port Drive-In cinema opens.
  - Charles Towne Landing State Historic Site established.
- 1972 – City of North Charleston incorporated, adjacent to City of Charleston.
- 1973 – Trident Technical College established.
- 1975 – Joseph P. Riley Jr. becomes mayor.
- 1977 – Spoleto Festival USA begins.
- 1980
  - Charleston Royals baseball team founded.
  - Population: 69,510.
- 1981 – Citadel Mall in business.
- 1983 – Lowcountry Food BankAbout Us | Lowcountry Food Bank and sister city relationship with Spoleto, Italy established.
- 1985 – College of Charleston's Avery Research Center for African American History and Culture established.
- 1989 – Hurricane Hugo.
- 1990 – Waterfront Park created.
- 1991 – Melvin's BBQ in business.
- 1992 – Charleston Grill in business.
- 1993
  - North Charleston Coliseum opens.
  - Charleston Battery soccer team founded.
- 1994 – Charleston Tibetan Society founded.
- 1995
  - Mark Sanford becomes U.S. representative for South Carolina's 1st congressional district.
  - Sunken civil war-era submarine Hunley rediscovered offshore.
- 1996
  - 100 Black Men of Charleston established.
  - City website online (approximate date).
- 1997
  - Charleston Area Regional Transportation Authority formed.
  - Charleston City Paper begins publication.
  - Joseph P. Riley Jr. Park stadium opens.
- 2000
  - South Carolina Aquarium opens.
  - The Hunley is raised from the seabed and placed in a museum in North Charleston

== 21st century ==
- 2003 – Charleston School of Law established.
- 2004 – Charleston Comedy Festival begins.
- 2005 - July 16: Cooper River Bridge opens.
- 2006 – Central Mosque of Charleston founded.
- 2007
  - Old Slave Mart museum opens.
  - Sofa Super Store fire.
- 2008 – TD Arena and Meeting Street Academy History | Meeting Street Schools - Closing the Opportunity Gap open.
- 2010
  - Husk restaurant in business.
  - The Charleston Promise Neighborhood incorporated.
  - Population: 120,083.
- 2011 – Tim Scott becomes U.S. representative for South Carolina's 1st congressional district.
- 2015
  - June 17: Nine people are killed, including the senior pastor and state senator Clementa C. Pinckney, at the Emanuel African Methodist Episcopal Church, by Dylann Roof, in the Charleston church shooting.
  - June 26: Funeral of Clementa Pinckney; U.S. President Barack Obama delivers eulogy.
  - November 17: John Tecklenburg is elected mayor in a runoff election, the first new mayor since 1975
  - November: Dramatic increase of the homeless camp under the Cooper River Bridge from roughly ten to over 600 residents. The primary cause is the increase in housing prices and a significant percentage of the camp residents had jobs but could not afford living accommodations.
- 2017 - January 20: Local anti-Trump inauguration protest held at Brittlebank Park has ~2,000 attendees.
- 2018 - Joe Cunningham is elected as the first Democratic congressional representative in decades and the first left-leaning Democrat in the history of South Carolina's 1st congressional district.
- 2019
  - January: The Dutch Dialogues begin. Facing the threat of global warming raising the sea level, the city government began official communication with officials in The Netherlands to help design and craft solutions to the massive flooding to come.
  - November 18: John Tecklenburg is reelected mayor after a runoff against Mike Seekings, with significant issues being concerns over flooding, tourism, new development, and housing prices
  - Autumn: Mumps outbreak at the College of Charleston has over 75 cases

== See also ==
- History of Charleston, South Carolina
- List of mayors of Charleston, South Carolina
- National Register of Historic Places listings in Charleston, South Carolina
- Media in Charleston, South Carolina
- List of museums in Charleston, South Carolina
- Charleston, South Carolina in the American Civil War

Other cities in South Carolina:

- Timeline of Columbia, South Carolina

== Bibliography ==
=== Published in 19th century ===
- Census of the city of Charleston, South Carolina, for the year 1848. Archived from the original on October 27, 2021.
- City Directory. 1852; 1882 Archived 2014-07-05 at the Wayback Machine; 1888
- City government annual report. 1870.
- Joseph Sabin, ed. (1870). "Charleston". Bibliotheca Americana. Vol. 3. New York. OCLC 13972268.
- William L. King (1872). Newspaper Press of Charleston, S.C.: a Chronological and Biographical History.
- Arthur Mazÿck (1875), Guide to Charleston illustrated, Charleston, S. C: Walker, Evans & Cogswell, OCLC 6033164, OL 14010614M
- Dallas, Eneas Sweetland (1878). "Charleston" . Encyclopædia Britannica. Vol. 5 (9th ed.). pp. 428–429.
- Sholes' Directory of the City of Charleston. 1882. Archived from the original on July 5, 2014.
- Business Guide of Charleston, S.C. Baltimore: Cooke, Howard & Co. 1889. Archived from the original on September 16, 2016 – via College of Charleston, Lowcountry Digital Library.
- Historic points of interest in and around Charleston, S. C. (Confederate re-union ed.), Charleston, South Carolina: Walker, Evans & Cogswell Co., 1896, OCLC 5733616, OL 6905223M
- "Charleston", Rand, McNally & Co.'s Handy Guide to the Southeastern States, Chicago: Rand, McNally & Co., 1899 – via Internet Archive

=== Published in 20th century ===
- City of Charleston. Year Book. 1903 Archived 2021-10-27 at the Wayback Machine; 1907 Archived 2021-10-27 at the Wayback Machine; 1910 Archived 2021-10-27 at the Wayback Machine
- South Carolina. Dept. of Agriculture (1908), "Charleston", Handbook of South Carolina, Columbia, South Carolina, OCLC 407046
- "Charleston (South Carolina)" . Encyclopædia Britannica. Vol. 5 (11th ed.). 1910. pp. 943–945.
- Edward Hungerford (1913), "Where Romance and Courtesy Do Not Forget", The Personality of American Cities, New York: McBride, Nast & Company
- Federal Writers' Project (1941), "Charleston", South Carolina: a Guide to the Palmetto State, American Guide Series, Boston: Houghton Mifflin + Chronology
- George C. Rogers Jr. Charleston in the Age of the Pinckneys. Norman: University of Oklahoma Press, 1969.
- Frederic Cople Jaher (1982). The Urban Establishment: Upper Strata in Boston, New York, Charleston, Chicago, and Los Angeles. University of Illinois Press. ISBN 978-0-252-00932-7. Archived from the original on March 28, 2017.
- Philip D. Morgan (1984). "Black Life in Eighteenth-Century Charleston". Perspectives in American History. 1 (n.s.). Harvard University. ISSN 0079-0990.
- Walter J. Fraser Jr. Charleston! Charleston!: The History of a Southern City. Columbia: University of South Carolina Press, 1989.
- Walter Edgar (1992). "A South Carolina Chronology, 1890–1991". South Carolina in the Modern Age. University of South Carolina Press. ISBN 978-1-61117-126-6. Archived from the original on April 30, 2016.
- George Thomas Kurian (1994), "Charleston, South Carolina", World Encyclopedia of Cities, vol. 1: North America, Santa Barbara, California: ABC-CLIO, OL 1431653M, archived from the original on October 27, 2021 (fulltext via Open Library)
- Hamer, Fritz P. Charleston Reborn: A Southern City, Its Navy Yard, and World War II (The History Press, 2005).
- Hamer, Fritz. "Giving a Sense of Achievement: Changing Gender and Racial Roles in Wartime Charleston: 1942-1945." Proceedings of the South Carolina Historical Association: 1997 (1997) online Archived 2021-10-27 at the Wayback Machine.
- "The South: South Carolina: Charleston", USA, Let's Go, New York: St. Martin's Press, 1999, OL 24937240M
- Walter J. Fraser Jr. (2000). "Charleston". In Paul Finkelman (ed.). Encyclopedia of the United States in the Nineteenth Century. Charles Scribner's Sons. ISBN 0684805006.
- John Meffert; et al. (2000). Charleston, South Carolina. Black America. Arcadia.

=== Published in 21st century ===
- Bradford L. Rauschenberg (2003). "Evidence for the Apprenticeship System in Charleston, South Carolina". Journal of Early Southern Decorative Arts. 29.
- Lester D. Stephens (2003). "The Literary and Philosophical Society of South Carolina: A Forum for Intellectual Progress in Antebellum Charleston". South Carolina Historical Magazine. 104. South Carolina Historical Society.
- Anthony Appiah and Henry Louis Gates, ed. (2005), "Charleston, South Carolina", Africana: the Encyclopedia of the African and African American Experience (2nd ed.), Oxford University Press, ISBN 978-0-19-517055-9, archived from the original on June 3, 2016
- David F. Marley (2005), "United States: Charleston", Historic Cities of the Americas, vol. 2, Santa Barbara, California: ABC-CLIO, p. 531+, ISBN 1576070271, archived from the original on June 27, 2014
- Eric Dabney; Mike Coker (2006). "Timeline". Historic South Carolina: an Illustrated History. South Carolina Historical Society and Historical Publishing Network. p. 56+. ISBN 978-1-893619-52-4. Archived from the original on April 28, 2016.
- Southern Foodways Alliance, University of Mississippi (2007), Charleston: Citadel of the Lowcountry (bibliography), archived from the original on September 24, 2016
- S. Dewan (September 9, 2010). "36 Hours in Charleston, S.C." New York Times. Archived from the original on April 20, 2017.
- Emma Hart (2010). Building Charleston: Town and Society in the Eighteenth-Century British Atlantic World. University of Virginia Press. ISBN 978-0-8139-2869-2. Archived from the original on October 27, 2021.
- Trevor Burnard; Emma Hart (2012). "Kingston, Jamaica, and Charleston, South Carolina: A New Look at Comparative Urbanization in Plantation Colonial British America". Journal of Urban History. 39.
