= List of Roman Catholic churches in the Diocese of Charleston =

This is a list of the Roman Catholic churches in the Diocese of Charleston, which encompasses the entire State of South Carolina in the United States. It does not include mission churches^{.}

Parish est.	Church name	Image	Location	Current building	Description/sources
1790 to 1850
1791	St. Mary of the Annunciation		Charleston	1806	The first Catholic church in the Carolinas
1806	Minor Basilica of St. Peter		Columbia	1909	The first Catholic church in Columbia.
1821	Cathedral of St. John the Baptist		Charleston	1868	Cathedral for the Diocese of Charleston.
1837	St. Patrick		Charleston	1899	
1839	St. Anne and St. Jude Parish		Sumter	2023	
1842	St. Peter		Cheraw		
1845	Stella Maris		Sullivan's Island		
1846	St. Peter		Beaufort		
1850 to 1900
1852	St. Mary		Greenville	1954	
1853	St. Mary Help of Christians		Aiken	1905	
1854	St. Joseph		Chester		
1856	St. Mary of the Immaculate Conception		Edgefield	1860	
1861	St. Joseph		Charleston	1861	Established as church for Irish immigrants
1868	St. Joseph		Anderson	1988	
1884	St. Paul the Apostle		Spartanburg		
1889	St. Mary, Our Lady of Ransom		Georgetown		
1895	St. William		Ward		
1898	St. John the Beloved		Summerville		
1900 to 1940
1911	St. Mary		Yonges Island		
1914	Our Lady of Perpetual Help		Camden	1914	
1917	Holy Trinity		Orangeburg	1982	
1919	St. Anne		Rock Hill	1998	
1920	Sacred Heart		Charleston	1939	
1929	St. John		North Charleston		
1935	St. Andrew		Clemson	1935	
1935	St. Martin de Porres		Columbia		
1938	Divine Saviour		York		
1939	St. Anthony of Padua		Greenville	1956	
1939	St. Louis		Dillon		
1940 to 1950
1940	St. Andrew		Clemson		
1941	St. Mary the Virgin Mother		Hartsville	1940	
1943	St. Mary of the Angels		Anderson	1951	
1944	Blessed Sacrament		Charleston	1962	
1945	St. James the Younger		Conway	1961	
1945	St. Mary		Rock Hill	2006	
1945	Our Lady of Lourdes		Greenwood	2004	
1946	St. Andrew		Myrtle Beach		
1948	St. Catherine of Siena		Lancaster	1948	
1948	St. Joseph		Columbia		
1949	Our Lady of Peace		North Augusta		
1949	St. Boniface		Joanna		
1949	St. Joseph		Columbia		
1950 to 1970
1952	Our Lady of the Rosary		Greenville		
1952	St. Philip the Apostle		Lake City		
1952	St. Theresa		Winnsboro		
1953	St. Thomas More		Columbia		Located at the University of South Carolina
1956	Divine Redemer		Hanahan		
1956	St. Mark		Newberry		
1959	Nativity		Charleston		
1959	St. John of the Cross		Batesburg-Leesville		
1960	St. Gregory the Great		Bluffton	2000	
1963	St. Anthony		Ridgeland		
1965	Holy Cross		Pickens		
1965	St. Peter Benizi		Moncks Corner		
1964	Our Lady Star of the Sea		North Myrtle Beach		
1964	Good Shepherd		McCormick		
1964	St. Edward		Murphy's Village		Originally established as parish for Irish Travelers.
1966	St. Thomas the Apostle		North Charleston	1968	
1967	Holy Spirit		Johns Island	2004	
1967	St. Augustine		Union		
1970 to 2000
1972	St. Elizabeth Ann Seton		Simpsonville		
1972	Our Lady of the Hills		Columbia		
1973	Christ Our King		Mount Pleasant	1979	
1973	Holy Family		Hilton Head Island	1988	
1975	St. Michael the Archangel		Murrells Inlet		
1976	Immaculate Conception		Goose Creek		
1976	Prince of Peace		Taylors		
1977	St. John Neumann		Columbia	1978	
1978	Our Lady of the Lake		Chapin		
1979	Corpus Christi		Lexington	1980	
1979	Jesus Our Risen Saviour		Spartanburg	1987	
1979	St. Gerald		Aiken	1962	
1981	Sacred Heart		Gaffney	1955	
1983	All Saints		Lake Wylie	2006	
1984	St. Francis by the Sea		Hilton Head Island	1991	
1984	St. Theresa the Little Flower		Summerville	2011	
1985	Blessed Trinity		Greer	1985	
1985	Precious Blood of Christ		Pawleys Island		
1989	St. Mary Magdalene		Simpsonville		
1993	St. Philip Neri		Fort Mill	2013	
1994	St. Paul the Apostle		Seneca		
1998	Transfiguration		Blythewood	2004	
1999	St. Benedict		Mount Pleasant	2010	
2000 to present
2002	St. Mary Our Lady of Hope		Manning	2003	
2004	St. Ann		Santee	2005	
2006	Our Lady of Good Counsel		Folly Beach	1950	
2007	St. Ann		Kingstree		
2013	Our Lady of Grace		Lancaster	2016	
2012	St. Clare of Asissi		Daniel Island		
2015	Our Lady of La Vang		Greer		
2020	Blessed Pier Giorgio Frassati		Carolina Forest	2020	

== See also ==
- List of Catholic churches in the United States
