= Anna DeCosta Banks =

American nurse (1869–1930)

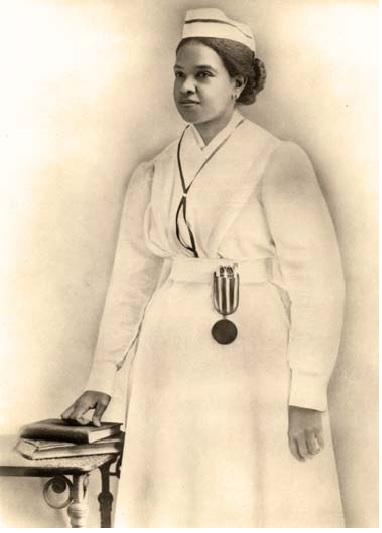
- Born: September 2, 1869; Charleston, South Carolina, U.S.
- Died: November 29, 1930 (aged 61)
- Education: Hampton Institute, 1891; Hampton Institute Dixie Hospital of Nursing, 1895
- Occupation: Nurse

Anna DeCosta Banks (September 2, 1869 – November 29, 1930) was an American nurse, and the first head nurse at the Hospital and Training School for Nurses in Charleston, South Carolina. Banks is known for her nursing career, as well as a later position as superintendent for 32 years at the same training school for nurses. Specifically designed for women of color, this hospital was later renamed McClennan-Banks Memorial Hospital in her honor.

== Personal life ==
Banks was the daughter of Samuel and Elizabeth DeCosta. She married Issiah Banks, and in 1889 she gave birth to Evangeline Banks Harrison in Hampton, Virginia. Harrison went on to become the Medical Records Librarian at McClennan-Banks Memorial Hospital, which was partly named in honor of her mother.

== Early life and education ==
Anna DeCosta Banks was born on September 2, 1869, in Charleston, South Carolina. She attended Charleston Public Schools for her primary education. In 1891 she graduated from Hampton Institute, now known as Hampton University, in Virginia, where she was one of the first students to earn a diploma. Afterwards, she enrolled in Hampton's Dixie Hospital of Nursing, where she was one of the school's first graduates.

== Career ==
Banks was the first head nurse at the Hospital and Training School for Nurses in Charleston, South Carolina, located at 135 Cannon Street. This hospital was later renamed to McClennan-Banks Memorial Hospital. She became the Superintendent of Nurses, a position she held for 32 years. She stressed the need for funds to create hospitals to offer practical training for Black nurses who were denied assignments to rounds in most hospitals because of segregation. Throughout her career she focused on seeking more equitable health care for African Americans by deeply caring while only charging them the cost of board and medicine.

Additionally, Banks wrote an article in 1899 regarding the issues African-American nurses faced for the Hampton Training School for Nurses and Dixie Hospital. At this time, segregation affected where African-American nurses were able to work. Banks stressed the need for funding and donations at various hospitals to provide practical training for African-American nurses.

Meanwhile, Banks also privately worked as a visiting public-health nurse for the Ladies Benevolent Society for Charleston starting in 1898. She served this society for twenty-four years and as a collector interacting with Black policyholders for the Metropolitan Life Insurance Company.

== Legacy ==
When Banks died, the community honored her with the tribute: "All ages, classes, races, called her blessed". Banks had such a significant effect on nursing within the state of South Carolina that the Medical University of South Carolina named a wing of their hospital after her. In 1930, Banks passed away and was known as the oldest nurse working in South Carolina at the time. In addition, the name of the Hospital and Training School for Nurses was changed to McClennan-Banks Hospital. However, this hospital closed in 1977.
