= Robert E. Guglielmone =

American prelate

His Excellency, The Most Reverend Robert Eric Guglielmone
- Bishop Emeritus of Charleston
- Church: Catholic Church
- Diocese: Charleston
- Appointed: January 24, 2009
- Installed: March 25, 2009
- Retired: February 22, 2022
- Predecessor: Robert J. Baker
- Successor: Jacques E. Fabre

Orders
- Ordination: April 8, 1978 by John R. McGann
- Consecration: March 25, 2009 by Edward Egan, William Murphy, and Robert Joseph Baker

Personal details
- Born: December 30, 1945 (age 80) New York, New York, US
- Education: St. John's University; New York University; Seminary of the Immaculate Conception
- Motto: Walk humbly with your God

Styles of Robert Eric Guglielmone
- Reference style: His Excellency; The Most Reverend
- Spoken style: Your Excellency
- Religious style: Bishop

Robert Eric Guglielmone (born December 30, 1945) is an American Catholic prelate who served as bishop of Charleston in South Carolina from 2009 until 2022.

== Biography ==
=== Early life and education ===
Robert Guglielmone was born on December 30, 1945, in New York City to Frank and Caroline Guglielmone. He has two brothers, Nicholas and Tito Guglielmone. The family moved to Long Island in New York when he was a child. Guglielmone graduated from a Catholic high school there in 1964. He then attended St. John's University in Queens, where he obtained a bachelor's degree in education.

Guglielmone taught business at Patchogue-Medford High School in Medford, New York, for five years while working on a graduate degree at New York University. Deciding to become a priest, Guglielmone entered the Seminary of the Immaculate Conception in Huntington, New York, during the 1970s, earning a Master of Divinity degree in 1977.

=== Priesthood ===
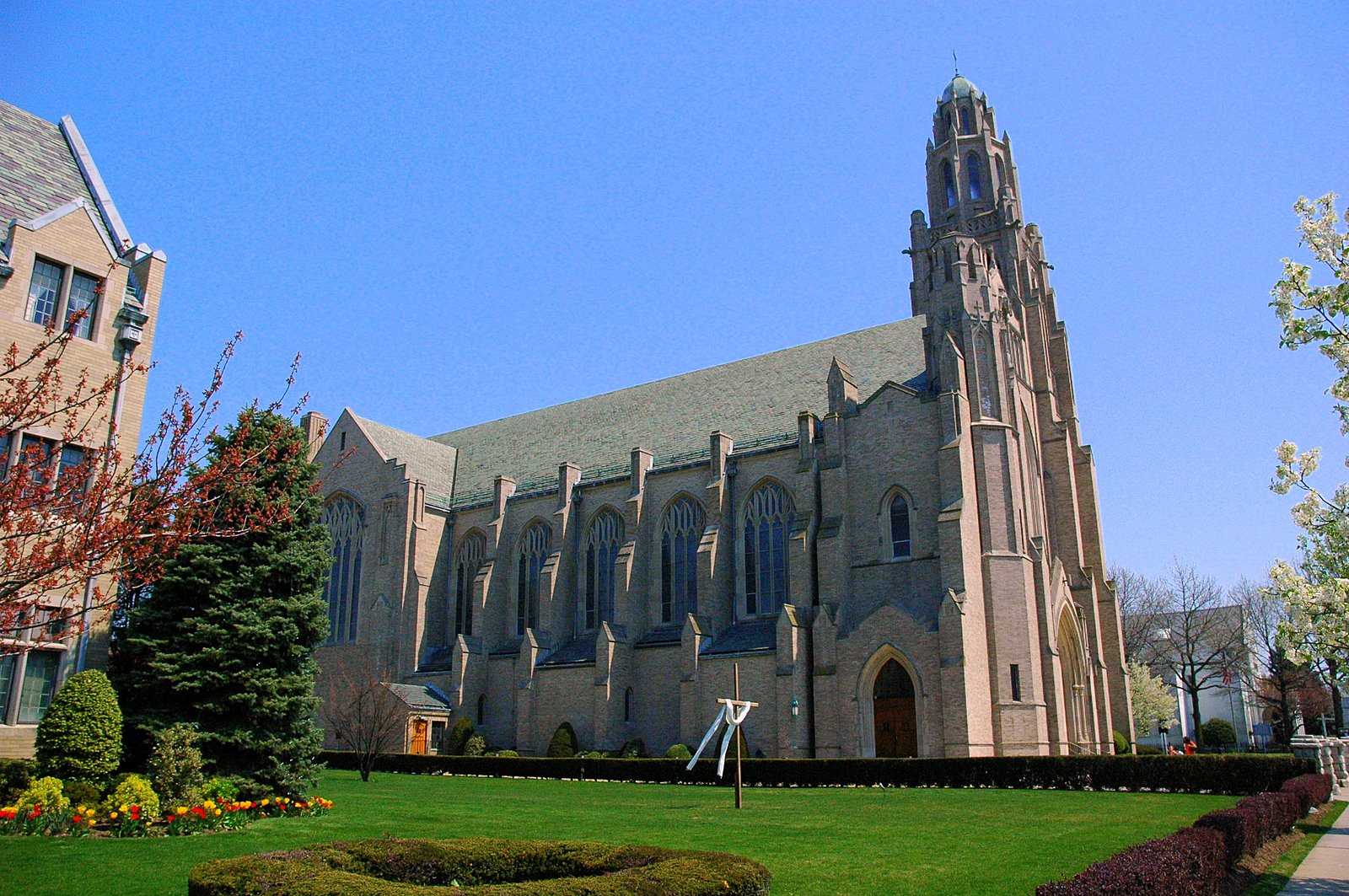
St. Agnes Cathedral, Rockville Centre, New York (2011)

Guglielmone was ordained to the priesthood at St. Agnes Cathedral in Rockville Centre by Bishop John R. McGann for the Diocese of Rockville Centre on April 8, 1978. After his ordination, the diocese assigned Guglielmone as assistant pastor at St. Martin of Tours Parish in Amityville, New York, and at St. James Parish in Setauket, New York. In 1986, he was named director of pastoral formation and dean of seminarians at Immaculate Conception.

Guglielmone was appointed pastor of St. Frances de Chantal Parish in Wantagh, New York, in 1993, and was raised by the Vatican to the rank of monsignor in 1996. In 2003, after the publication of a grand jury report on the handling of sexual abuse cases in the diocese, Bishop William Murphy named Guglielmone as the diocesan director of clergy personnel. He was appointed rector of St. Agnes Cathedral in 2007.

==== Scouting involvement ====
Guglielmone is known for his substantial involvement in scouting. He started his scouting career as camp chaplain at the Onteora Scout Reservation in Livingston Manor, New York, during his time as a seminarian. As a priest, he served as scout chaplain for the Diocese of Rockville Centre, then for New York State and then as chaplain for the National Catholic Committee on Scouting. Guglielmone served an eight-year term as chaplain of the International Catholic Conference of Scouting and as the Vatican's global liaison to scouting programs.

Guglielmone is a member the Order of the Arrow. He was inducted as a "Vigil Honor" member in 1985. Guglielmone's vigil name is Nekama Auwen Allohumasin Lilenowag An Unt (He Who Exemplifies God's Law).

=== Bishop of Charleston ===
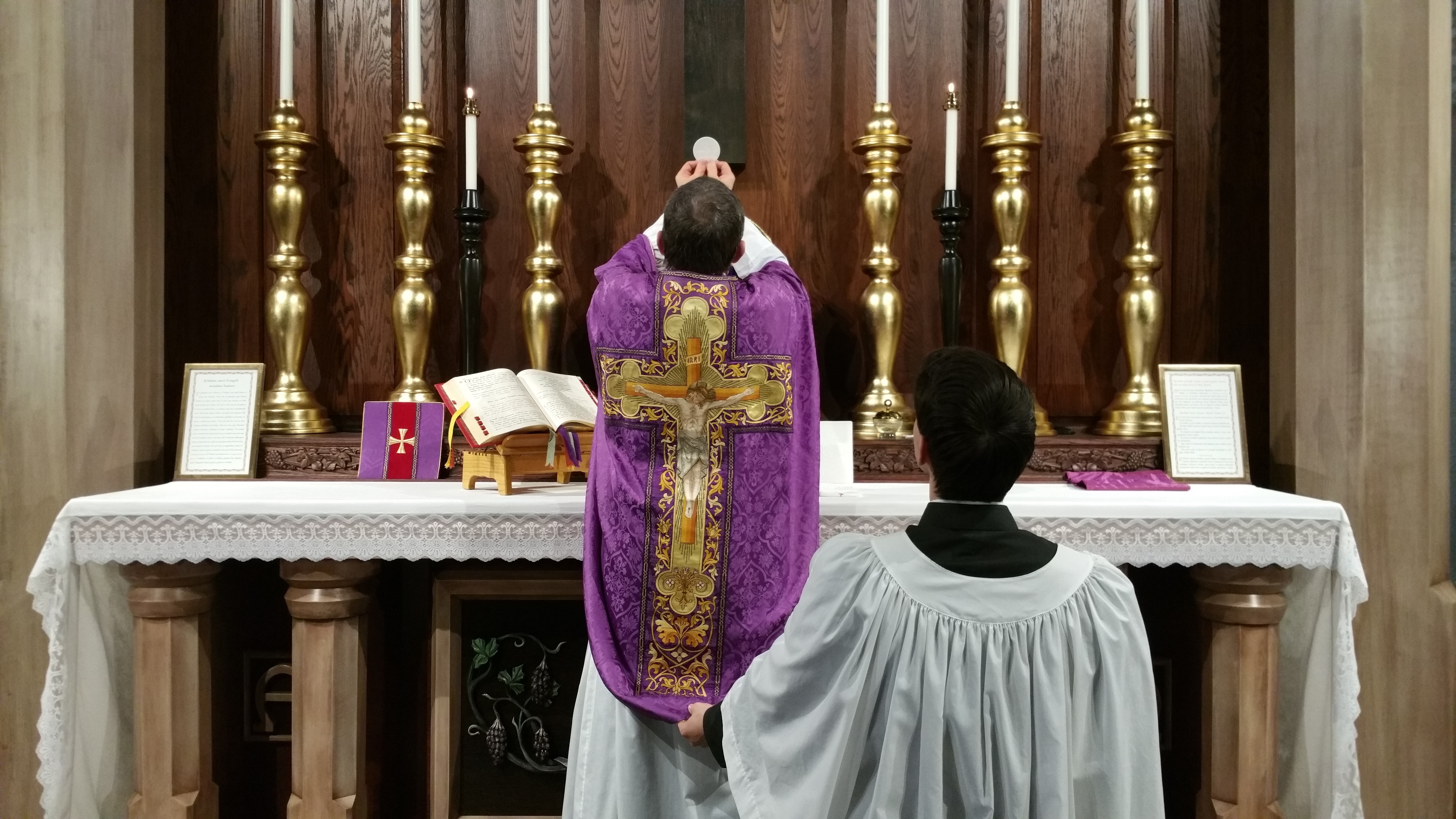
Tridentine mass with priest facing the altar (2017)

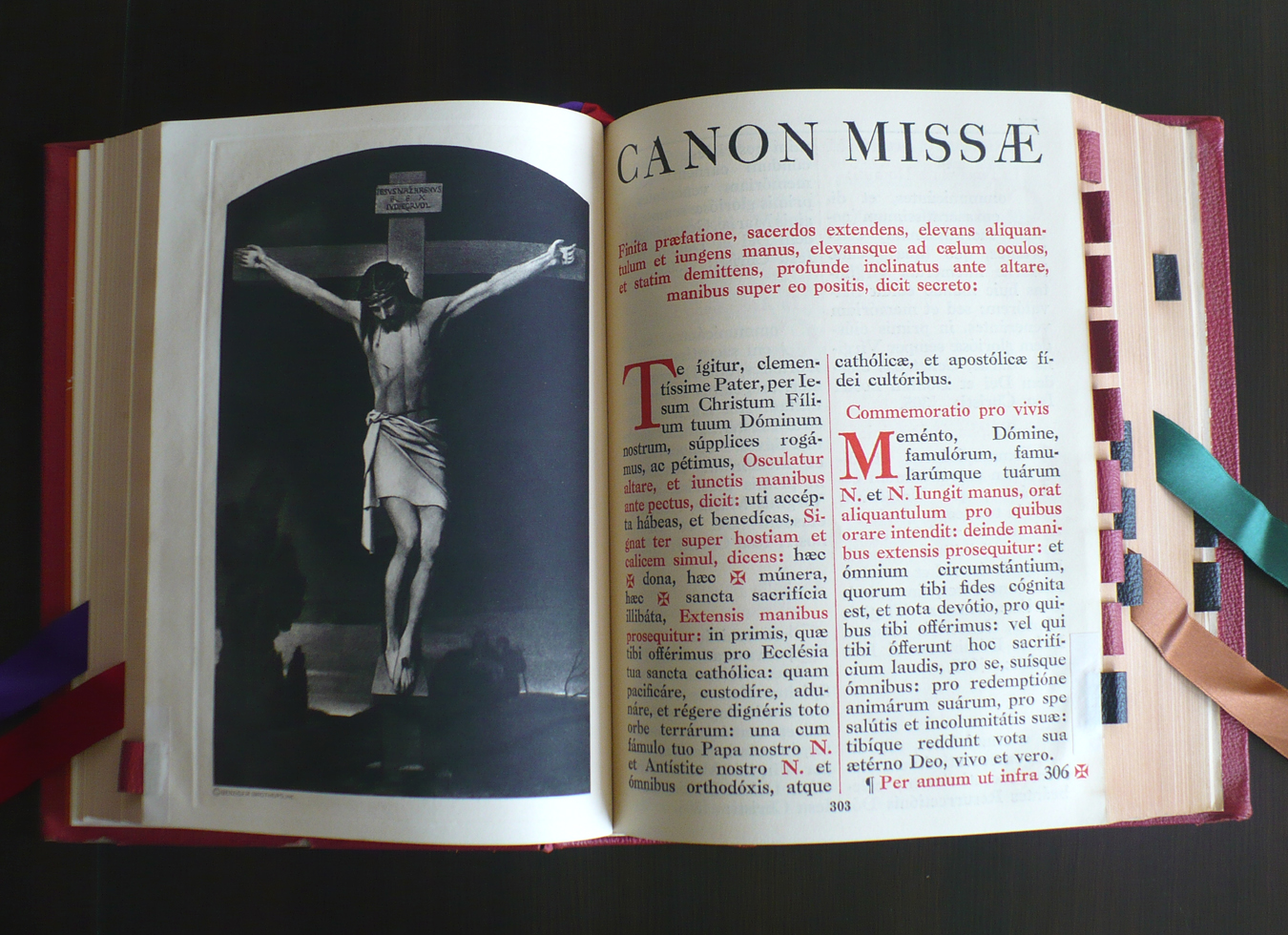
1962 Roman Missal

On January 24, 2009, Guglielmone was appointed as the 13th bishop of Charleston by Pope Benedict XVI. He received his episcopal consecration on March 25, 2009, from Cardinal Edward Egan, with Bishops Murphy and Robert Baker serving as co-consecrators, at the Cathedral of St. John the Baptist in Charleston.

Guglielmone in Mary 2019 published a list of priests, deacons, seminarians and members of religious orders within the diocese with credible accusations of sexual abuse of minors.

In August 2019, Guglielmone was sued in New York State by a man claiming Guglielmone sexually abused him at age eight. The abuse allegedly took place between 1978 and 1979 at St. Martin of Tours Parish in Amityville, when Guglielmone was assistant pastor there. Guglielmone denied the allegations. The Diocese of Rockville Centre investigated the allegation and found it not credible. In December 2020, the Vatican concluded its own investigation and determined Guglielmone to be innocent of the charges.

Guglielmone submitted his letter of resignation as bishop of Charleston to Pope Francis in December 2020 at the mandatory age of 75. The pope did not accept his resignation at that time.

On August 9, 2021, Guglielmone temporarily suspended Reverend Wilbroad Mwape, the pastor at St. Anthony of Padua Parish in Greenville, South Carolina. A female parishioner had sued Mwape, stating he manipulated her into a sexual relationship while he was posted at Holy Trinity Parish in Orangeburg, South Carolina. In December 2021, without commenting on the allegations, Guglielmone returned Mwape to St. Anthony.

In November 2021, Guglielmone was sued by a former altar boy. The plaintiff alleged that Guglielmone and the diocese were covering up sex abuse committed against him by Reverend Robert Kelly at St Andrew Parish in Myrtle Beach, South Carolina in the early 1990s.

In November 2021, Guglielmone banned his priests from conducting confirmations or the anointing of the sick using the Roman Missal. He also restricted the practice of the Tridentine Mass within the diocese. These steps followed the 2021 publication by Francis of Traditionis custodes, an ecclesiastical letter that set new rules on these liturgies.

== Retirement ==
On February 22, 2022, Francis accepted Gugliemone's resignation as bishop of Charleston.

== Awards ==
- Silver Antelope Award from Boy Scouts of America (2004)
- Brother Barnabas Founders Award from the National Catholic Committee on Scouting (1998)
- Silver Saint George Emblem from the National Catholic Committee on Scouting (1998)
- Silver Buffalo Award from Boy Scouts of America (2012)

== See also ==
- Catholic Church hierarchy
- Catholic Church in the United States
- Historical list of the Catholic bishops of the United States
- List of Catholic bishops of the United States
- Lists of patriarchs, archbishops, and bishops

== Episcopal succession ==
Catholic Church titles
Preceded by Robert J. Baker	Bishop of Charleston; January 24, 2009–February 22, 2022	Succeeded by Jacques E. Fabre

{{|url=https://www.usccb.org/news/2022/pope-francis-accepts-resignation-bishop-robert-guglielmone-diocese-charleston-appoints |title=Pope Francis Accepts Resignation of Bishop Robert Guglielmone of Diocese of Charleston; Appoints Rev. Jacques Fabre, C.S. as Successor |accessdate=February 22, 2022}}
