= St. Joseph's Catholic School (Greenville, South Carolina) =

Location
- 100 St. Joseph's Drive; Greenville, South Carolina 29607; United States; 34°48′38″N 82°20′22″W

Information
- Type: Private, Coeducational
- Religious affiliation: Roman Catholic
- Established: 1993 (33 years ago)
- Oversight: Diocese of Charleston
- Headmaster: Keith F. Kiser
- Grades: 6–12
- Campus size: 36 acres (15 ha)
- Colors: Royal blue and white
- Athletics conference: SCHSL 3A
- Nickname: Knights
- Website: www.sjcatholicschool.org

St. Joseph’s Catholic School is a private, Roman Catholic, co-educational day school located in Greenville, South Carolina.

== History ==
St. Joseph’s was founded in 1993 when nine people created the school. They started their first year with a class of thirteen 9th graders and began with a donation of $800. The first thirteen students went to school with a complete college preparatory education, attended a P.E. class with the help of the local YMCA, and attended Mass every week. In January 1994, St. Joseph’s relocated to a campus that was 16,000 square feet. Later that year, in May, St. Joseph’s received full South Carolina Independent School Association accreditation. Later in the year, 47 students attended the school, and a 10th-grade class was added. In 1995, the school’s Math team won the statewide Math competition for their division, which greatly impacted the school’s achievements and future ambitions. By September 1996, St. Joseph’s had a full four-year high school program, and a middle school wing was added nearly ten years later in 2005. Later in November, the first on-campus gym was built. In addition to the continued rate of expansion of St. Joseph's, in 2008, the campus was expanded by adding extensions for the middle school and the athletics and fine arts departments. The school continues to grow, with a recent Middle school extension, adding two more floors in the Middle School wing.

In April 2023, St. Joseph's announced a $3 million campus expansion that would include multiple classrooms and space for the learning environment. The groundbreaking for this expansion occurred on May 1, 2024.
