= St. John Paul II Catholic School (South Carolina) =

Saint John Paul II High School

Location
- Ridgeland, (Jasper County), SC 29936; United States
- Coordinates: 32.3616°N 80.8718°W

Information
- Type: Private
- Religious affiliation: Roman Catholic
- Established: 2011
- Grades: 6–12
- Colors: Gold and blue
- Team name: Golden Warriors

Saint John Paul II Catholic School (John Paul II) is a diocesan Roman Catholic school in Okatie, South Carolina, United States. Founded in 2011 and opened in 2013, the school offers grades 6 through 12 for students in Beaufort and Jasper counties. The school is supported through its affiliation with the Diocese of Charleston. It is the fourth diocesan school to be in operation in South Carolina, joining Bishop England High School in Charleston, Cardinal Newman High School in Columbia and Bishop Baker High School in Myrtle Beach.

Originally called Pope John Paul II Catholic School, the school changed its name upon the canonization announcement of John Paul II. The school began operating in August 2013 with its campus to be partially completed in 2014. It is anticipated that 60 to 100 students will be enrolled in grades 7, 8, and 9, with additional grades being added each year.

The school's campus is located along South Carolina Highway 170 in Okatie along the Beaufort and Jasper county line. It is centrally located between Beaufort, Port Royal, Hardeeville and Ridgeland.
