= Cathedral of Saint John and Saint Finbar =

1st Roman Catholic cathedral in Charleston, South Carolina (1854–1861)

- The Cathedral

Religion
- Affiliation: Roman Catholic
- Diocese: Diocese of Charleston
- Ecclesiastical or organisational status: Cathedral

Location
- Location: Charleston, South Carolina, United States
- Interactive map of Cathedral of Saint John and Saint Finbar
- Coordinates: 32°46′35″N 79°56′4″W

Architecture
- Architect: Patrick C. Keely
- Style: Gothic Revival
- Completed: 1854
- Construction cost: $103,000

Specifications
- Direction of façade: South
- Capacity: 1,200
- Length: 156 ft (48 m)
- Width: 72 ft (22 m)
- Width (nave): 72 ft (22 m)
- Height (max): 216 ft (66 m)
- Spire: 1
- Spire height: 216 ft (66 m)

The Cathedral of St. John and St. Finbar was the first Roman Catholic cathedral in Charleston, South Carolina. The cathedral followed the first Roman Catholic Church in Charleston, St. Mary's, founded around 1800. Construction began in 1850 with the cathedral consecrated on April 6, 1854. It was destroyed on December 11, 1861, in a fire that ravaged much of Charleston. A new cathedral—the Cathedral of Saint John the Baptist, built on the same site-was started in 1890. It opened in 1907 and was completed in 2010 with the addition of the long-anticipated steeple.

== History ==
The first Bishop of the Roman Catholic Diocese of Charleston (previously the diocese of the Carolinas and Georgia), Bishop John England (of County Cork, Ireland), originally conceived of the cathedral. In 1821 he purchased the site of a garden in Charleston called “New Vauxhall”. A house was on the lot, and on December 30, 1821, Bishop England blessed it as a temporary chapel and named it in honor of St. Finbar, the patron saint of Cork. He then set about planning and raising funds for a cathedral for the see. However, Bishop England did not live to see the Cathedral constructed. The Right Reverend Ignatius Reynolds succeeded Bishop England in 1844 and oversaw the final construction.

The cathedral was designed by Patrick Charles Keely (of County Tipperary, Ireland) in the highly ornate Gothic Style, as a 219-foot-tall structure topped with a steeple and bronze cross. The Cathedral of St. John and St. Finbar was, like its successor the Cathedral of Saint John the Baptist, clad in brownstone from Connecticut.

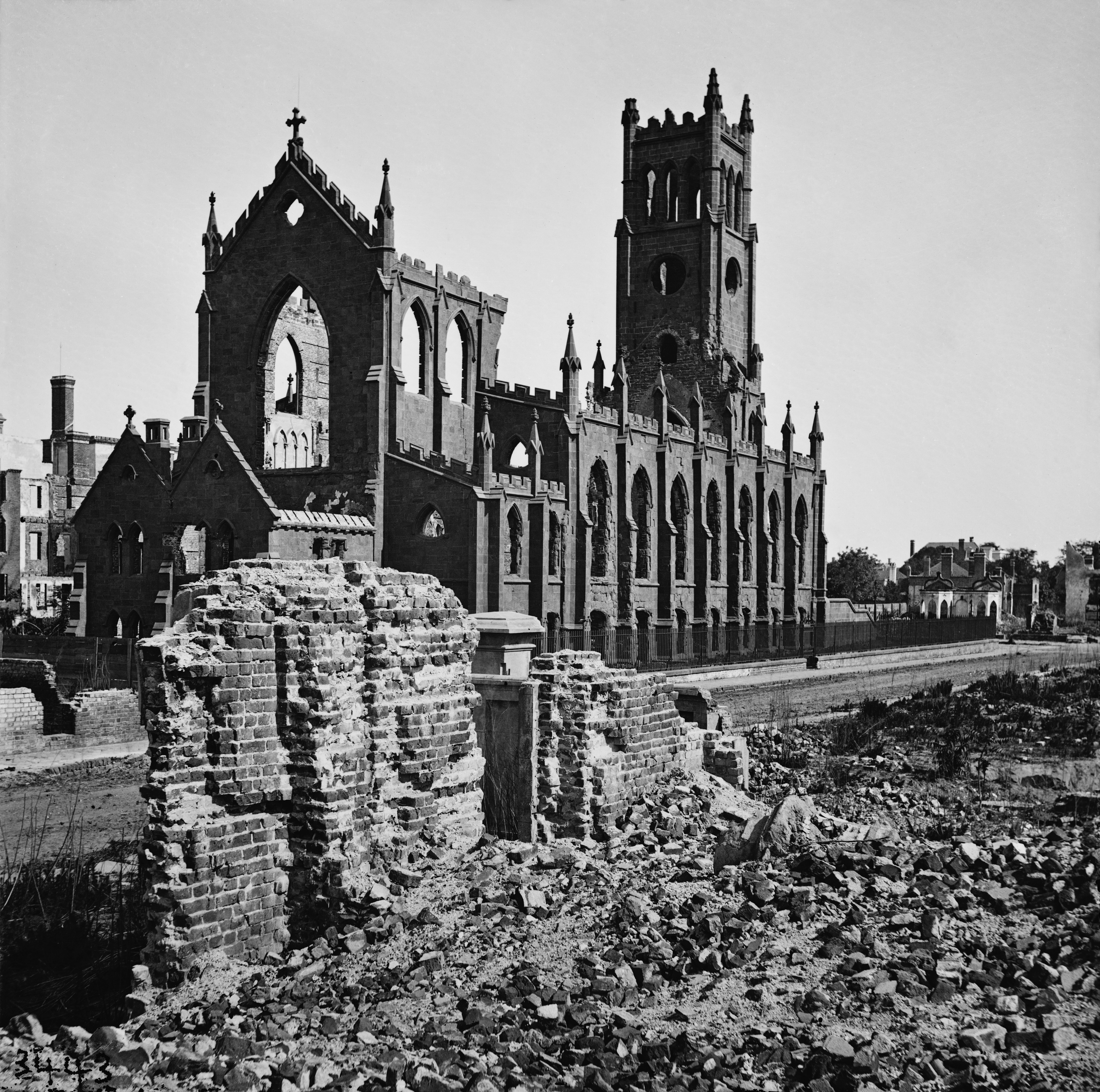
Cathedral of St. John and St. Finbar after the Great Fire of 1861

Believing the cathedral's brownstone construction made it fire safe, congregants and neighbors filled the cathedral with their valuables hoping in vain to protect them from the Great Fire of 1861. A week prior to the 1861 destruction by fire, the cathedral's insurance policy was allowed to lapse. This lack of insurance coverage combined with the realities of the Civil War in Charleston caused the Cathedral ruins to stand for decades unaddressed. The ruins stood until the major 1886 Charleston earthquake caused the remains of the tower to collapse.

The fire that destroyed the cathedral also destroyed the diocese seminary, the first Catholic free school for girls, the diocese 17,000-volume library, the offices of the first Catholic newspaper in the US (The Catholic Miscellany), and countless church documents. The total destruction left the congregation without a home for 29 years until the cathedral's replacement with the new Keely designed brownstone Gothic style Cathedral of Saint John the Baptist at the same Broad Street location.

The original Cathedral was named for the well known St. John the Baptist and the lesser-known St. Finbar. Bishop John England is probably responsible for honoring St. Finbar in the naming of the cathedral. St. Finbar was the founder of the abbey that became the City of Cork, Ireland. The Right Reverend John England was consecrated in Cork Cathedral prior to coming to Charleston in 1821 and was thus quite familiar with the Irish Saint Finbar. Other than being well represented in the naming of Catholic institutions throughout history, it is not known why St. John the Baptist was honored in the naming.

The Gibbes Museum of Art and the Carolina Art Association possess a famous 1868 painting of the ruins of the Cathedral of Saint John and Saint Finbar by William Aiken Walker. There is also a likeness of the cathedral from April 1854 to December 1861 available in Wikipedia.

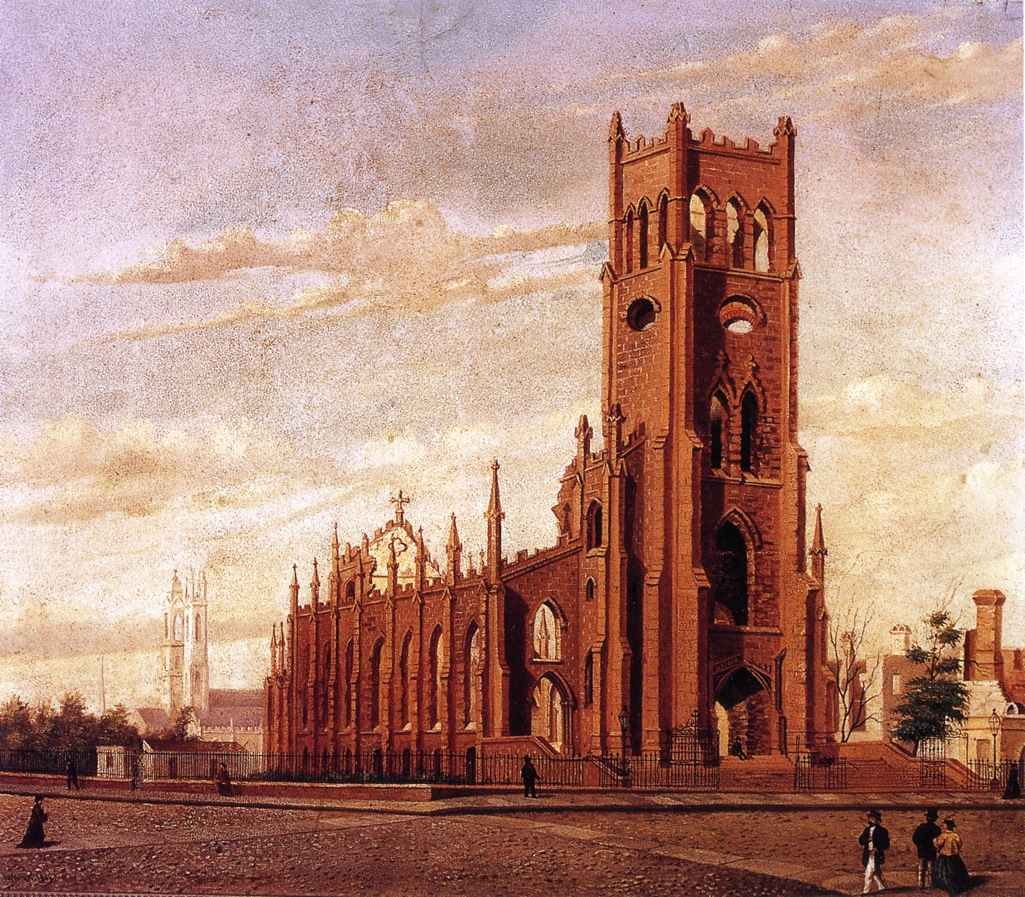
St Finbar Ruins Charleston William Aiken Walker painting 1868

== See also ==
- List of Catholic cathedrals in the United States
- List of cathedrals in the United States
- List of the works of Patrick Keely
