= Jacques Fabre-Jeune =

US Catholic bishop

The Most Reverend Jacques Eric Fabre-Jeune CS
- Bishop of Charleston
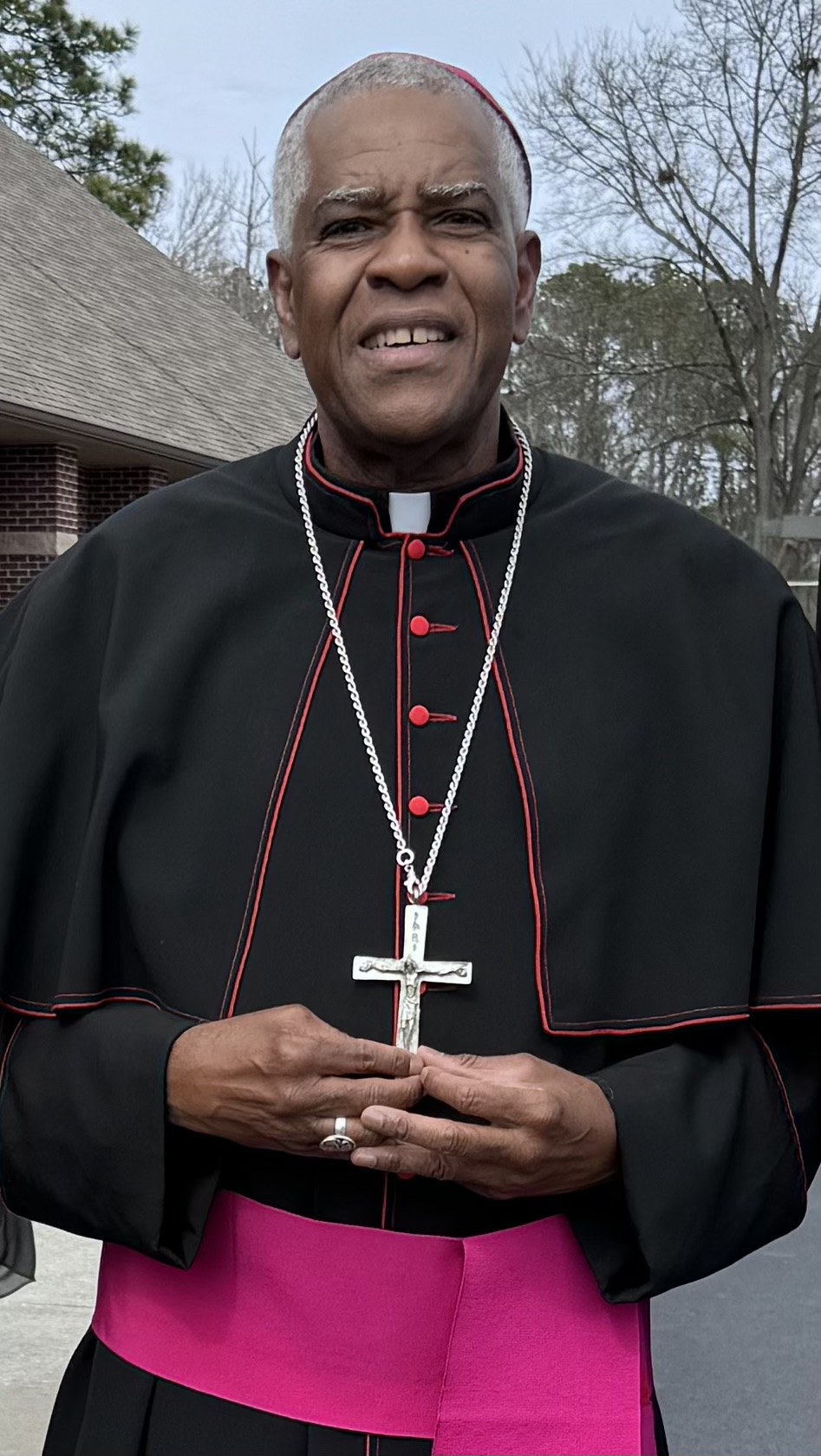
- Fabre-Jeune in 2024
- See: Diocese of Charleston
- Appointed: February 22, 2022
- Installed: May 13, 2022
- Predecessor: Robert E. Guglielmone
- Previous posts: Pastor, San Pedro de Macorís (1991–2004); Parochial Vicar, St. Joseph’s and Holy Trinity Parishes (2006–2010); Administrator, San Felipe de Jesús Mission (2009–2022)

Orders
- Ordination: October 10, 1986 by Wilton Gregory
- Consecration: May 13, 2022 by Wilton Gregory, Gregory John Hartmayer, and Luis R. Zarama

Personal details
- Born: November 13, 1955 (age 70) Port-au-Prince, Haiti
- Education: St. John's University; University of St. Michael's College; Catholic Theological Union; Pontifical Urban University
- Motto: Whatever you do to the least of my children, you do to me

Styles of Jacques Eric Fabre-Jeune
- Reference style: His Excellency; The Most Reverend
- Spoken style: Your Excellency
- Religious style: Bishop

Jacques Eric Fabre-Jeune, C.S. (born November 13, 1955) is a Haitian-born American prelate of the Catholic Church who has served as bishop of the Diocese of Charleston in South Carolina since 2022.

Fabre-Jeune is the first Haitian-American to head a diocese. Since being ordained a priest in 1986, Fabre-Jeune has worked in Florida, Georgia, the Dominican Republic, and briefly at a refugee camp at Guantanamo Bay. He is a member of the Congregation of the Missionaries of Saint Charles Borromeo (Scalabrinians).

== Biography ==
=== Early life ===
Jacques Fabre-Jeune was born in Port-au-Prince, Haiti, on November 13, 1955. He was one of six children in his family. As a teenager, he emigrated to the United States, settling in New York City where he completed his high school education. He then attended St. John's University in New York before transferring to University of St. Michael's College in Toronto to begin seminary studies. During his novitiate with the Scalabrinians, Fabre-Jeune served in a mission in Mexico, gaining early exposure to cross-cultural ministry.

Fabre-Jeune continued his theological education at the Catholic Theological Union in Chicago and the Scalabrini House of Theology. He later earned a Master of Divinity and a Licentiate in Migration Studies from the Urbaniana University in Rome.

=== Priesthood ===
Fabre-Jeune was ordained a priest of the Scalabrinians on October 25, 1986, by Auxiliary Bishop Wilton D. Gregory at St. Theresa of Avila Church in Brooklyn.His first pastoral assignment from the Scalabrinians was at Our Lady of Guadalupe Parish in Immokalee, Florida. In 1990, during the Haitian refugee crisis, Fabre-Jeune was assigned as a chaplain to Haitian detainees at the American Guantanamo Bay Naval Base in Cuba. He was involved in a reported altercation with military police during their efforts to protect a detainee.

In 1991, Fabre-Jeune was assigned to the Dominican Republic where he pastored a parish in San Pedro de Macorís for over a decade. There, he worked with Haitian immigrants and developed community services in an environment marked by ethnic and racial tension.

Upon returning to the United States, Fabre-Jeune was assigned as a parochial vicar at St. Joseph’s Parish in Athens, Georgia (2006 to 2008), and Holy Trinity Parish in Peachtree City, Georgia (2008 to 2010). In 2009, he became administrator of San Felipe de Jesús Mission in Forest Park, Georgia. Fabre-Jeune led a predominantly Hispanic congregation and successfully spearheaded the construction of a new self-funded church, dedicated in 2011.

From 2010 to 2022, Fabre-Jeune held multiple administrative roles in the Archdiocese of Atlanta, including:

- Member of the finance council
- Member of the budget and operations committee
- Member of the projects review committee
- Director of the Hispanic Charismatic Renewal

Fabre-Jeune also served as the superior of the Scalabrinian religious community in Atlanta.

=== Bishop of Charleston ===
On February 22, 2022, Pope Francis appointed Fabre-Jeune as the 14th bishop of Charleston. He was the first Haitian-American to lead the diocese, as well as the first member of a religious order to do so. He was consecrated bishop on May 13, 2022, at the Charleston Area Convention Center in North Charleston. The principal consecrator was Cardinal Wilton D. Gregory, with co-consecrators Archbishop Gregory John Hartmayer and Bishop Luis R. Zarama.

Since his installation, Fabre-Jeune has emphasized inclusion, youth engagement, and immigration reform. He has visited nearly all parishes in the diocese and launched listening sessions with clergy and laity to assess pastoral needs and administrative transparency.

Fabre-Jeune is fluent in five languages: English, Spanish, Italian, French, and Haitian Creole.

== See also ==
- Catholic Church hierarchy
- Catholic Church in the United States
- Historical list of the Catholic bishops of the United States
- List of Catholic bishops of the United States
- Lists of patriarchs, archbishops, and bishops

Catholic Church titles
Preceded by Robert E. Guglielmone	Bishop of Charleston; 2022–present	Succeeded by Incumbent
