= Cathedral of Saint John the Baptist (Charleston, South Carolina) =

Church in South Carolina, United States

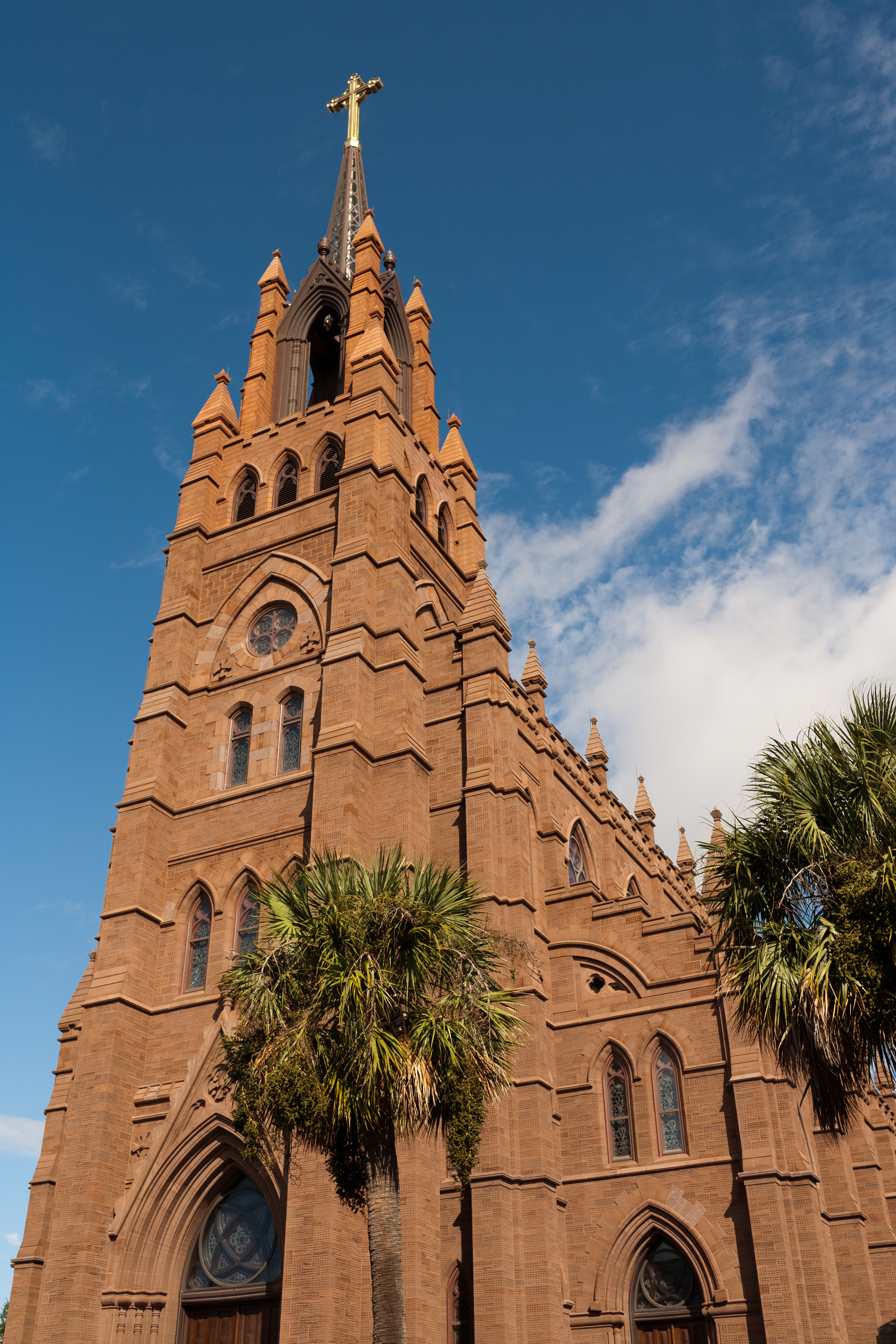
- Cathedral of Saint John the Baptist, Charleston, South Carolina (2011)

- Location in South Carolina Location in United States
- 32°46′35.4″N 79°56′4.2″W
- Location: 120 Broad Street Charleston, South Carolina
- Country: United States
- Denomination: Roman Catholic Church
- Website: charlestoncathedral.com

History
- Founded: 1800

Architecture
- Architect(s): Patrick C. Keely; Decimus C. Barbot; Ruben Solar (belfry & spire)
- Style: Gothic Revival
- Groundbreaking: 1890
- Completed: 1907 (Spire-2010)

Specifications
- Capacity: Upper church – 720; Lower church – 200
- Length: 200 ft (61 m)
- Width: 80 ft (24 m)
- Materials: Connecticut tool-chiseled brownstone

Administration
- Diocese: Charleston

Clergy
- Bishop: Most Rev. Jacques E. Fabre
- Rector: Very Rev. Gregory B. Wilson, VG

The Cathedral of St. John the Baptist is the mother church of the Roman Catholic Diocese of Charleston, located in Charleston, South Carolina. Designed by Brooklyn architect Patrick Keely, the construction of the cathedral started in 1890 to replace a cathedral that burned down in 1861. St. John the Baptist was dedicated in 1907.

The cathedral has four chapels, one of which contains a crypt. The chapels, the doors and the upper church contain numerous stained glass windows that were created in France. The pipe organ was manufactured in the United States and the steeple bells were cast in France. The upper church of the cathedral has a seating capacity of 720 worshippers.

Bishop Jacques E. Fabre, the fourteenth bishop of Charleston, was consecrated and installed at the Cathedral of St. John the Baptist in 2022. As of 2025, the rector of the cathedral is the Very Rev. Gregory B. Wilson.

== History ==
Cathedral interior (1914)

Pope Pius VII erected the Diocese of Charleston in 1820. The diocese dedicated its first cathedral, the Cathedral of Saint John and Saint Finbar, in 1854. It only last seven years before being destroyed in the Charleston fire of 1861. Due to the ongoing American Civil War and the resulting impoverishment of the diocese, the diocese was unable to replace cathedral for several decades.

In 1890, after years of fundraising, Cardinal James Gibbons laid the cornerstone for the new Cathedral of St. John the Baptist. Designed by architect Patrick Keely, the new cathedral was built on the foundations of Saint John and Saint Finbar. Due to funding constraints, the diocese was unable to build a planned steeple and spire. St. John the Baptist Cathedral was dedicated in 1907.

The cathedral underwent extensive repairs in 1966 and 1967, then was renovated in 1982. The diocese in 1995 added a new altar and cathedra and replastered the interior walls. The cathedral was also repainted in the 1995 renovation.

In 2007, Bishop Robert J. Baker and Rector Joseph Roth announced plans to renovate and complete the cathedral. The stained glass windows were refurbished that same year. In 2010, the diocese finally added a steeple, spire and three bells.

== Exterior ==
=== Architecture ===
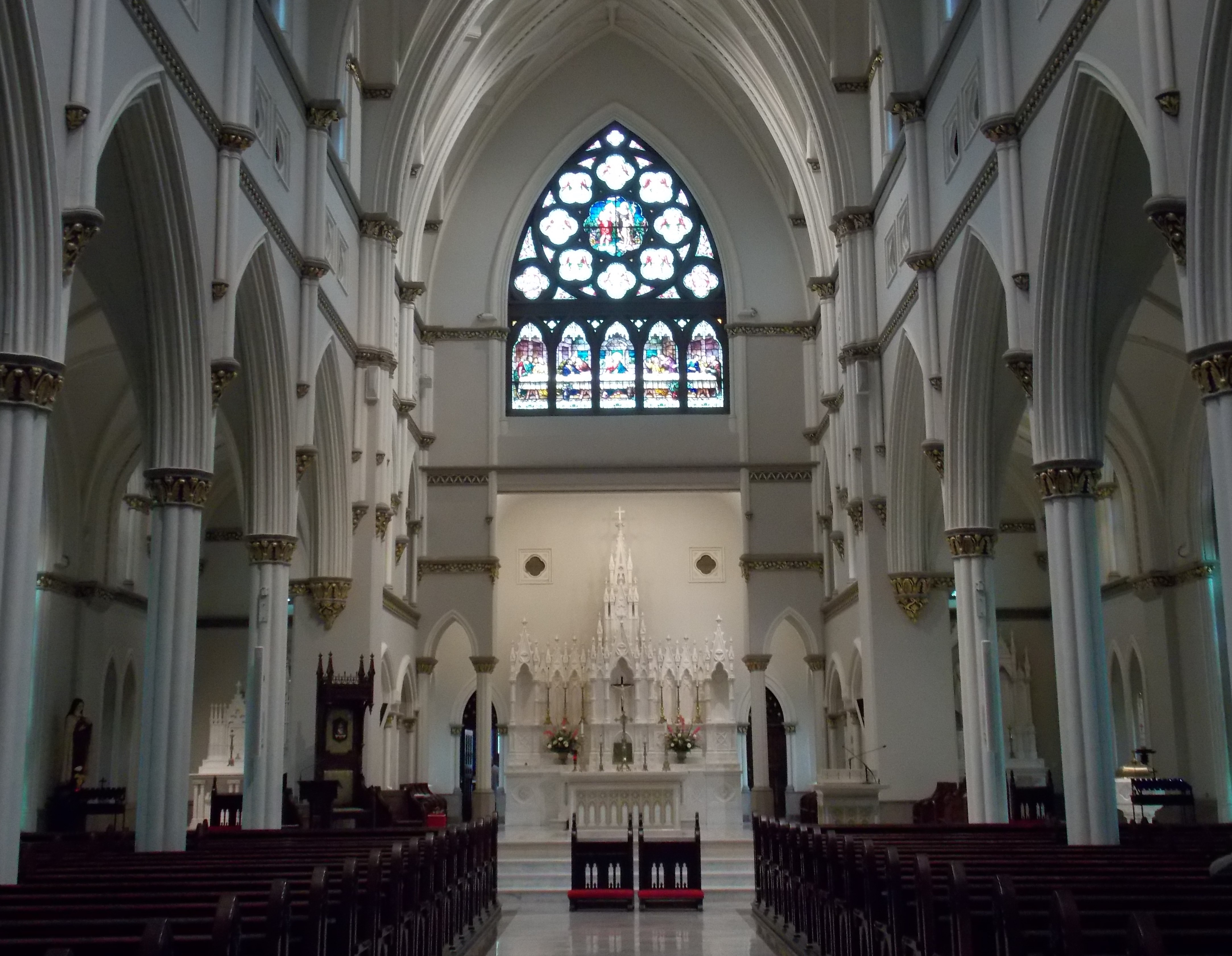
Cathedral interior (2015)

The architect P.C. Keely, the designer of many cathedrals in the United States and Canada, designed St. John the Baptist Cathedral in the Gothic Revival style. The original plans for new cathedral were similar to that of Saint John and Saint Finbar Cathedral, but were later altered.

- The building is constructed of Connecticut brownstone.
- The pews are made of carved Flemish oak.
- The three original altars were constructed out of white marble from Vermont

=== Spire and bell tower ===
The spire is covered in copper lattice and is topped with a 16x9 foot gilded copper Celtic cross. It was designed by Glenn Keyes Architects of Charlestown, using a sketch of the steeple from the Cathedral of Saint John and Saint Finbar. The spire has open grill work that reduces the wind load on the steeple by allowing the air to flow through.

The arches below the spire were fabricated from a special fiberglass used in ship building, clad in copper. The arches are decorated by brown cast stone pinnacles on each corner. The belfry is constructed of brown cast stone. It has copper louvers.

== Chapels ==
=== Sacred Heart Chapel ===
This chapel is situated left of the cathedra in the upper church. It originally served as the Chapel of the Blessed Sacrament,

Prior to 1968, when the bishop sat in front of the altar for a liturgical ceremony, the Blessed Sacrament was removed to this side altar so that the bishop would not have his back to the reserved sacrament. In 2008, the chapel briefly became the Chapel of Saint Paul for the Year of Saint Paul. Then in 2009, it became the Sacred Heart Chapel, housing an early 1900s statue of the Sacred Heart of Jesus with hands extended in blessing.

=== Blessed Virgin Mary Chapel ===
This chapel is sometimes referred to as Our Lady of the South Chapel. The statue was purchased during the American Civil War by Bishop Patrick Lynch, who had served as secret emissary to the Holy See for the Confederate States of America.

The altar in this chapel is adorned with an Italian marble statue of the Madonna and the baby Jesus, sculpted by the German artist Ferdinand Pettrich. The statue depicts Mary without a head covering, holding the child Jesus as a toddler, which distinguishes from similar sculptures.

=== Our Lady of Grace Chapel ===
This chapel is the main lower church, primarily used for overflow crowds at mass and as a gathering space when needed. It was formerly used for daily mass. This chapel has a seating capacity of 200 worshippers.

=== Saint John the Baptist Crypt Chapel ===
This chapel is resting place of the first five bishops of Charleston, along with the remains of Joanna Monica England, sister of Bishop John England. The bishops vest in this chapel for mass.

The chapel contains a custom, hand-painted altarpiece depicting John the Baptist over the South Carolina landscape. He is holding a lamb and is flanked by two angels, one holding a crosier and the other the diocesan coat of arms. The chapel contains a niche with a statue of St. Joseph and the child Jesus.

== Stained glass windows ==
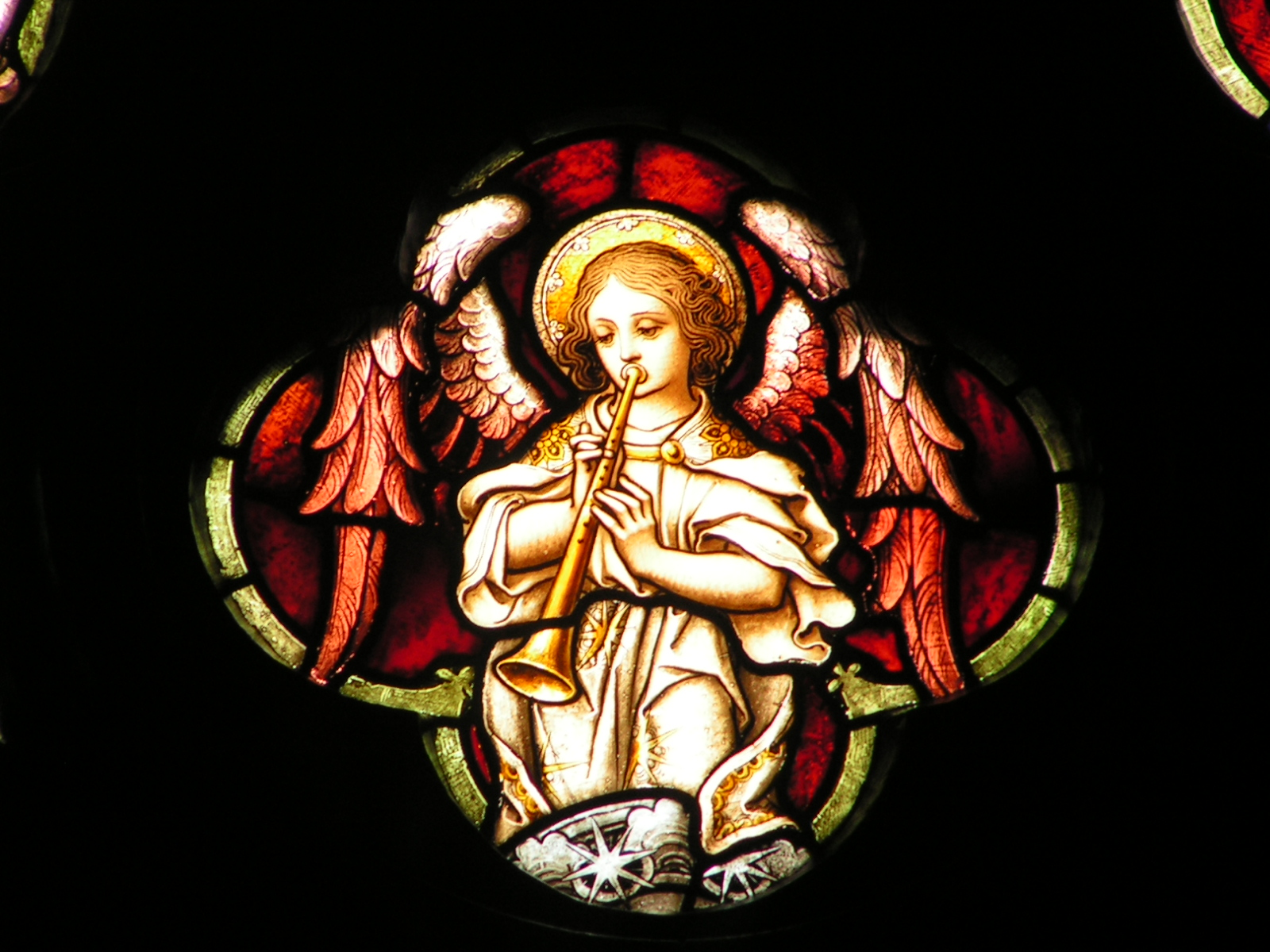
Angel with Horn stained glass window (2008)

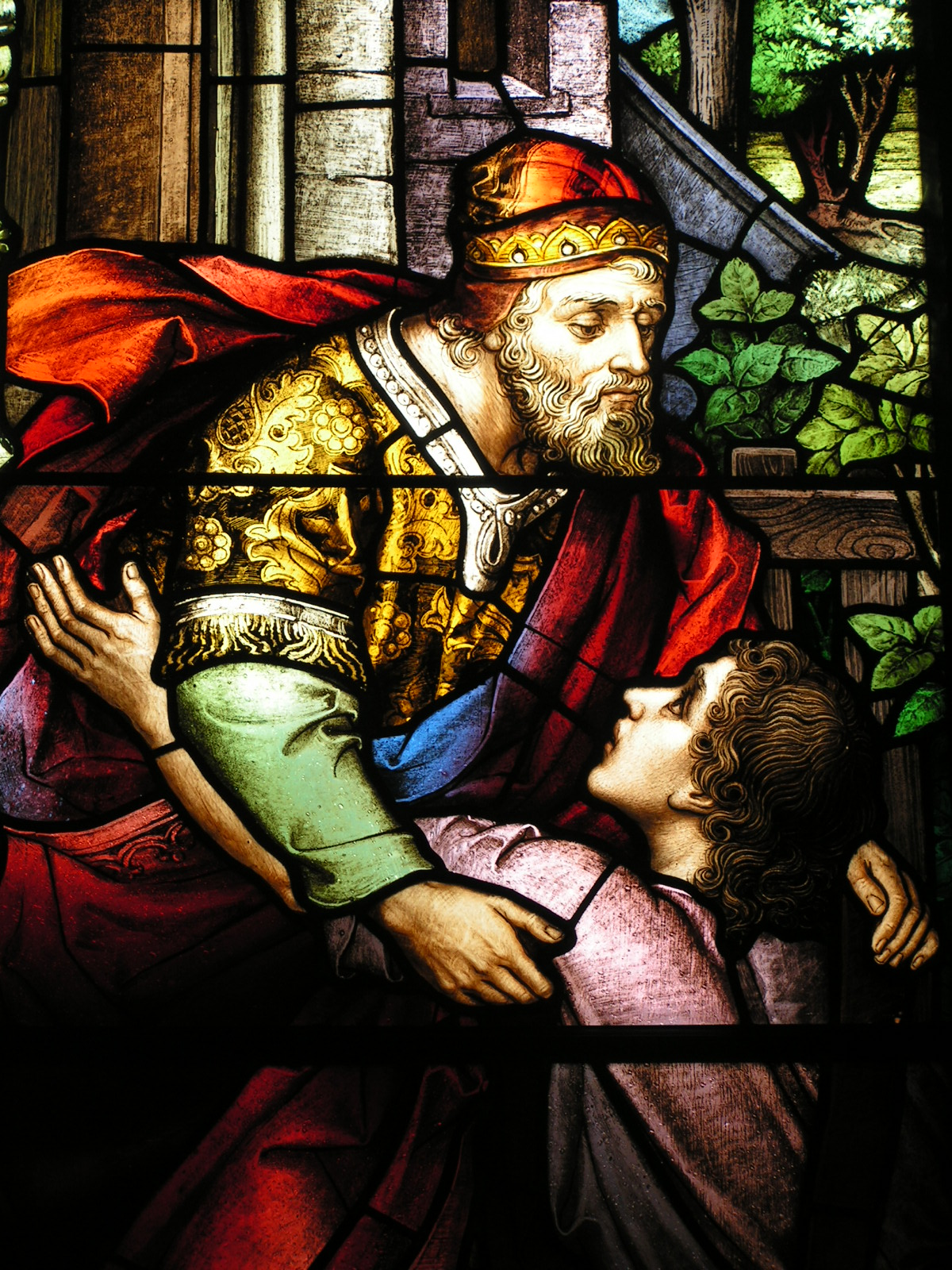
Return of Prodigal Son stained glass window (2008)

The cathedral is noted for its stained glass windows that were designed by the Franz Mayer & Co. of Munich, Germany.

=== Upper church ===
- The sides of the lower nave has 14 large two-light stained glass windows depicting the life of Christ from His birth to His ascension into heaven.
- The upper nave stained glass windows, known as the Gallery of the Saints, depict 28 saints.
- The clerestory stained glass windows depict Matthew, Mark, Luke and John, known as the four evangelists.
- The chancel stained glass window, located about the high altar, has several elements;
  - A rose window that depicts John the Baptist baptizing Jesus with the Holy Spirit above. It is surrounded by eight angels playing instruments.
  - A sacred heart
  - A pelican feeding her three chicks
  - The Lamb of God.
- Above the high altar is a five-light stained glass window replica of Leonardo da Vinci's painting, the Last Supper.

=== Chapels ===
- The Sacred Heart chapel contains seven stained glass windows depicting symbols of the Eucharist.
- Our Lady of Grace Chapel has eight stained glass windows that were salvaged from the former Immaculate Conception Church in Charleston. The chapel originally held 20 windows from that church.
- The Saint John the Baptist Crypt Chapel stained glass windows are constructed from pieces of windows salvaged from Immaculate Conception Church.
- The Blessed Virgin Mary Chapel has seven stained glass windows depicting Mary, Mother of God. It also has a floral design window.

=== Doors ===
The three sets of cathedral doors are surmounted by rose stained glass windows with coat of arms in their centers;

- The main doors – Bishop Henry P. Northrop's coat of arms
- The east doors – the State of South Carolina coat of arms
- The west doors – Pope Pius X's coat of arms

== Clergy ==
=== Bishop ===
Bishop Jacques Fabre-Jeune, CS

=== Rector ===
The Very Rev. Gregory B. Wilson (2023 – present )

=== Previous rectors ===
- Monsignor Budds
- Reverend James J May
- Monsignor Joseph Bernarden
- Reverend Frederick J Hopwood
- Monsignor Thomas R Duffy (Administrator c. 1984 – 1987)
- Monsignor Charles Rowland, P.A., V.G. (?-?; 1987 – 1990)
- Monsignor Sam R. Miglarese, V.G. (1990 – 1998)
- Monsignor Chester M. Moczydlowski (1998 – 2001)
- Monsignor Joseph R. Roth, P.A., V.G. (2001 – 2008)
- Reverend Gregory B. Wilson (2008 – 2011)
- Monsignor Steven L. Brovey (2011 – 2022)
- Monsignor D. Anthony Droze, V.G. (Administrator pro tempore)
- Very Reverend Gregory B. Wilson, (2023 – Present)

== Music ==
=== Bells ===
The three bronze bells in the bell tower were cast by the Fonderie Paccard in Annecy. France; they were blessed by Bishop Robert E. Guglielmone in 2009. The bells form an E major chord.

- Saint Therese bell
  - Note: B-3
  - Inscription: Revelation 5:12
- Saint Finbar bell
  - Note: G#-3
  - Inscription: Psalm 104:33
- Maria Stella Maris (Latin: Mary, Star of the Sea) bell
  - Note: E-3
  - Inscription: Psalm 95:1

=== Pipe organ ===
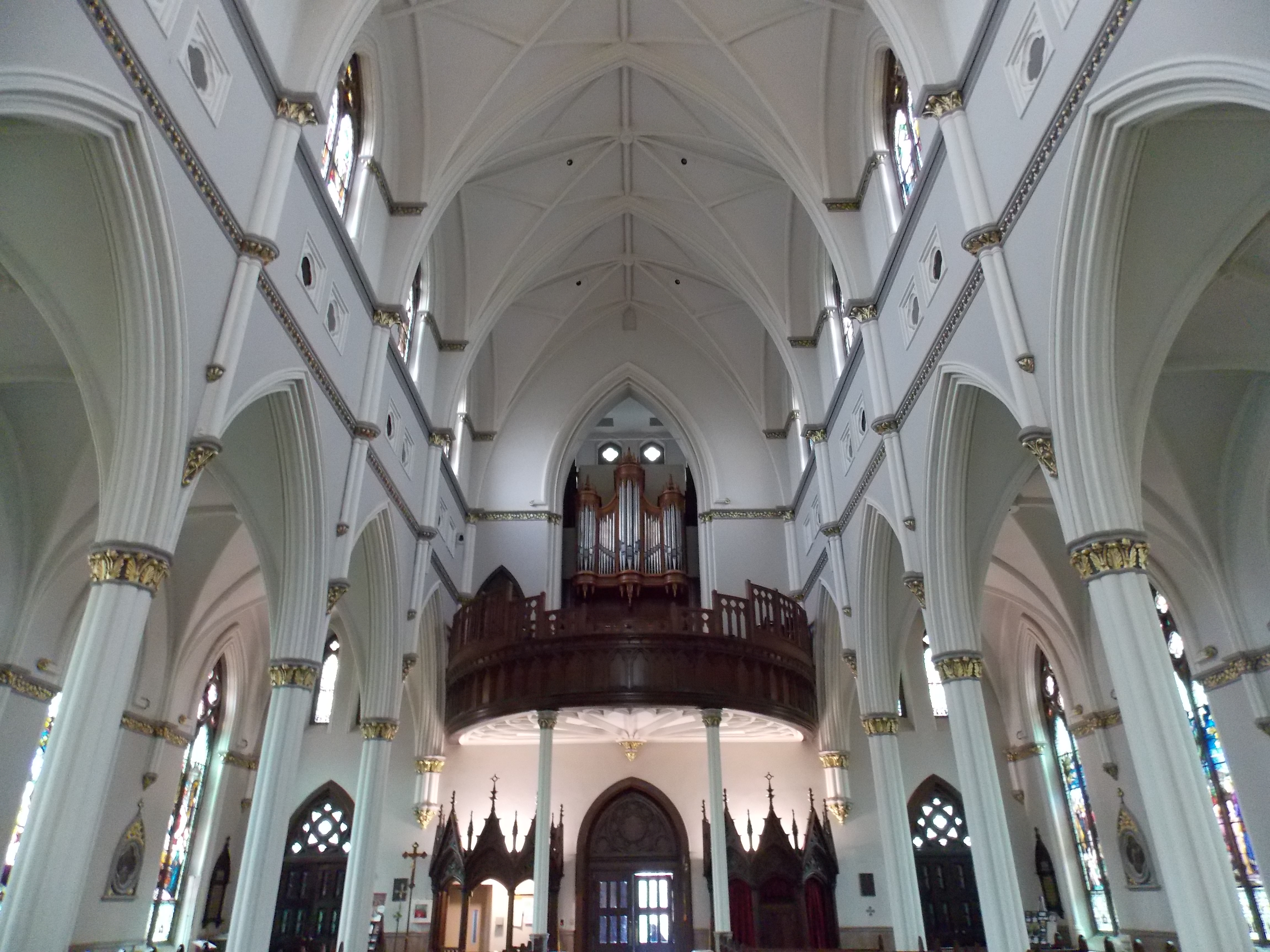
Bedient pipe organ in the rear gallery (2015)

The pipe organ is located in the rear gallery of the upper church. It is a Bedient pipe organ from Lincoln, Nebraska. It is a model Opus 22, mechanical action instrument with two manuals, 26 stops and 32 ranks. It was originally installed in Christ Church Episcopal Cathedral in Louisville, Kentucky in 1986.

After the diocese bought the organ, its builder, Gene Bedient, reinstalled in St. John the Baptist Cathedral in 1995. The Bedient pipe organ replaced an Opus 139 pipe organ from the Ernest M. Skinner Co., that was installed in 1903.

=== Directors of music ===
- Director of music and organist (1950 – 1991): Virginia Sturcken
- Director of music (1991 – 2000): Bill Schlitt
- Director of music and principal organist (2000 – 2009): Mark Thomas
- Organist and choirmaster (May 2010 – 2014): Scott Turkington
- Organist and choirmaster (2014 – January 2019): Daniel Sansone
- Director of sacred music (2019 – present): Scott Powell

=== Choirs ===
- The Cathedral Choir – principal choir
Cathedral images

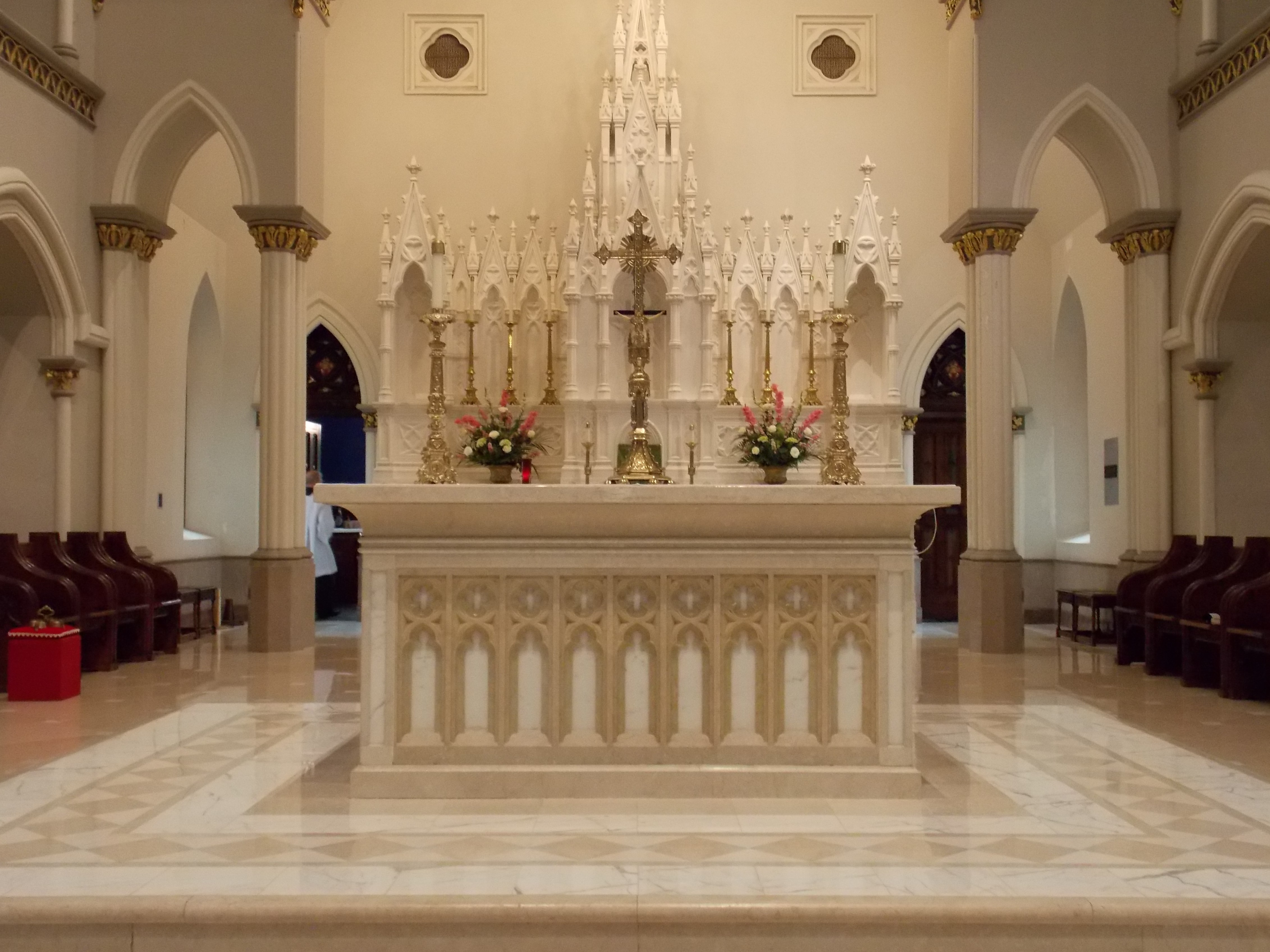
Altar (2015)

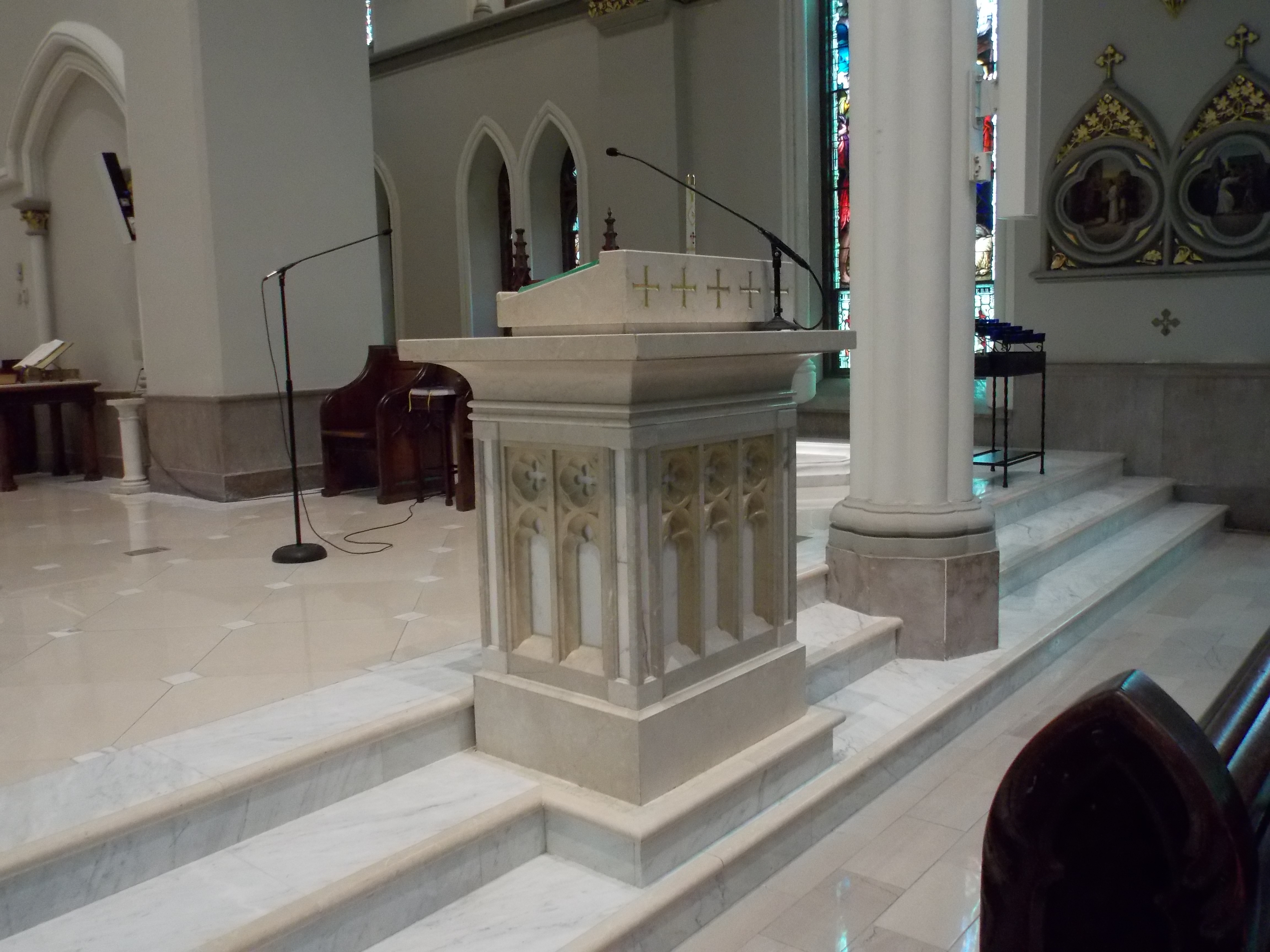
Ambo (2015)

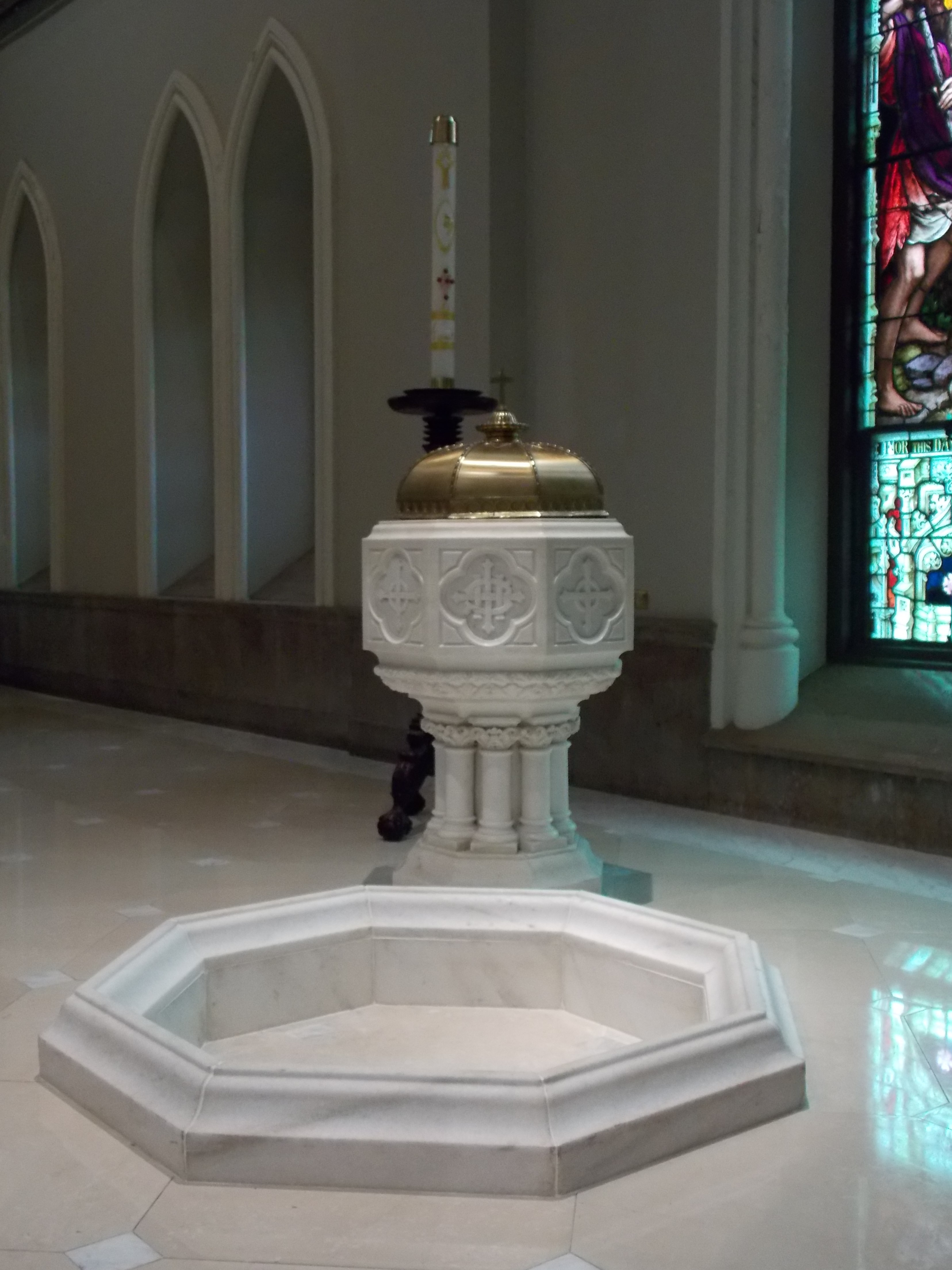
Baptismal font (2015)

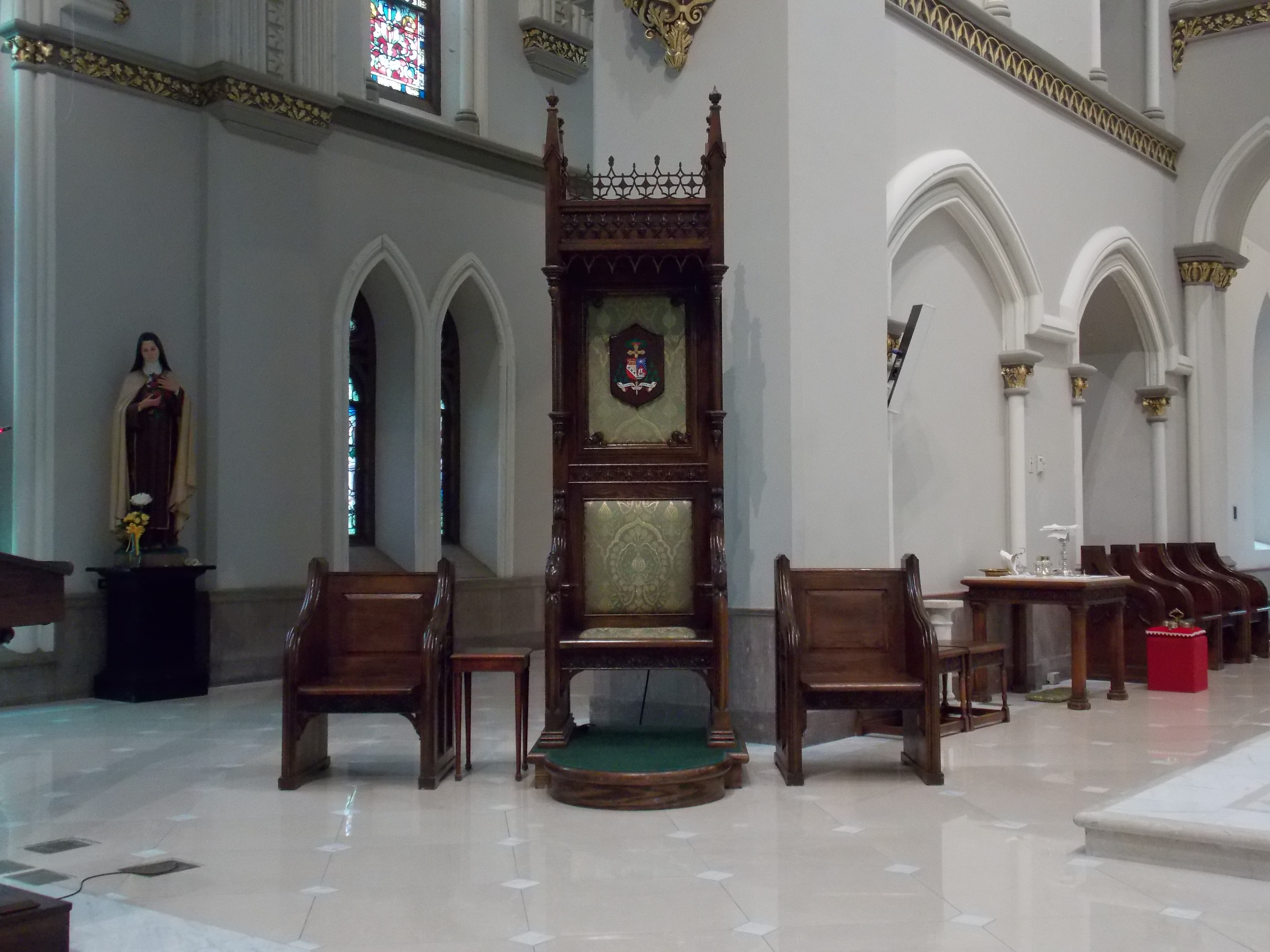
Cathedra (2015)

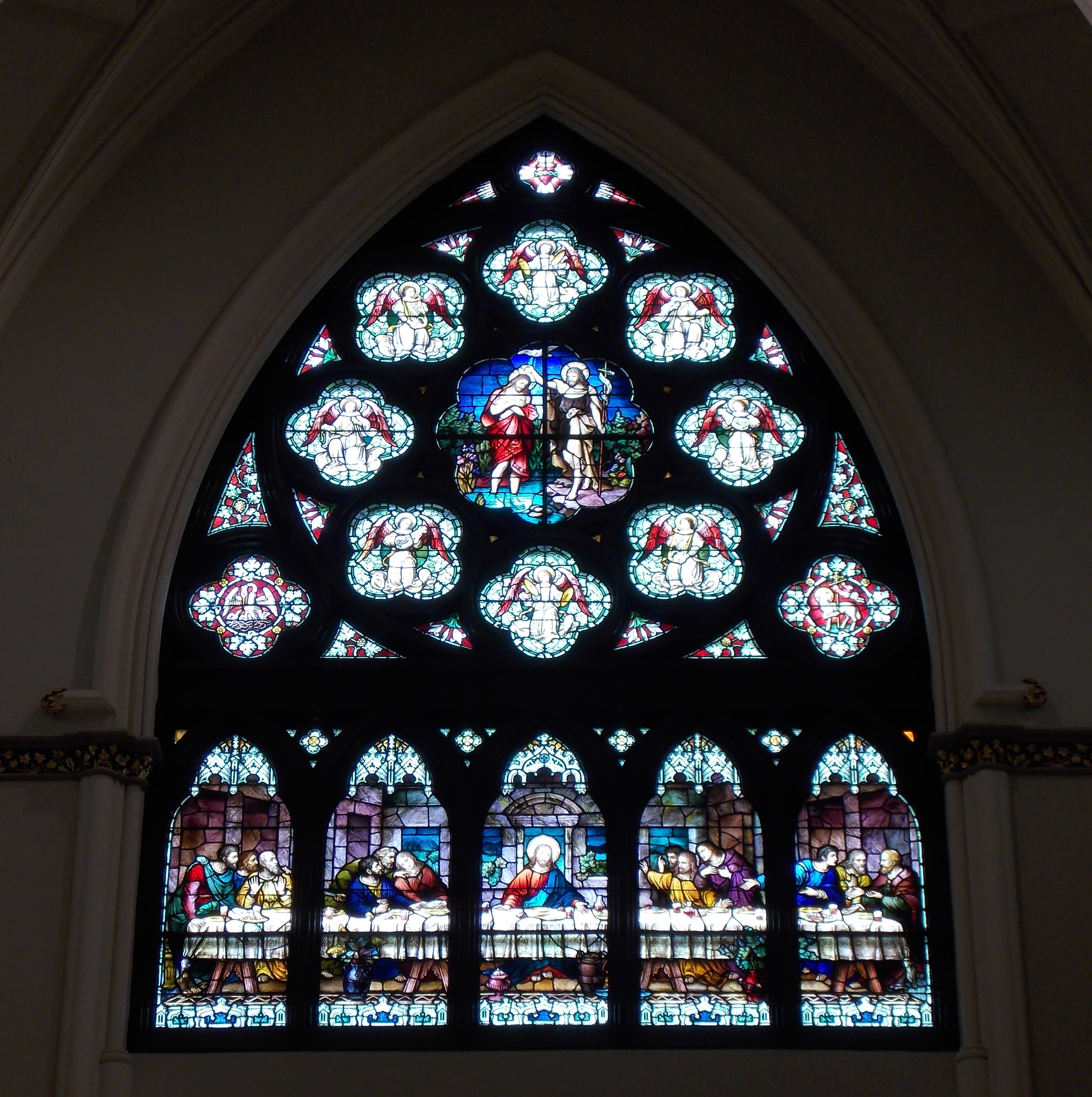
Last Supper stained glass window (2015)

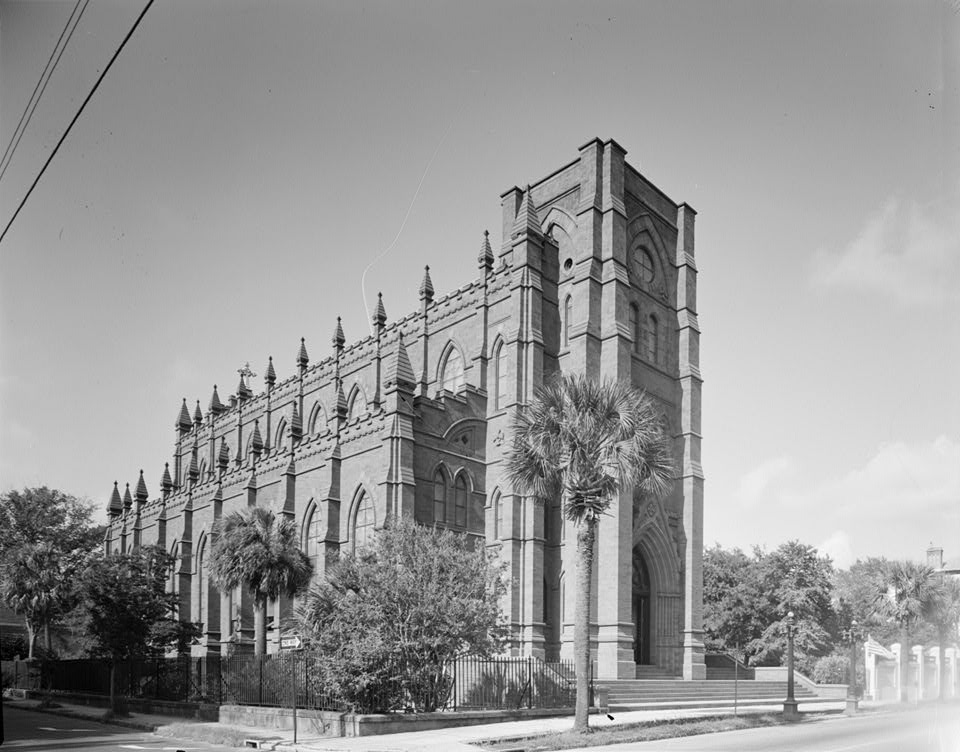
Cathedral without steeple (1977)

== See also ==
- List of Catholic cathedrals in the United States
- List of cathedrals in the United States
