= Ladies Benevolent Society (Charleston) =

Defunct women's organization (1813-1861)

Ladies Benevolent Society (LBS) is a charitable organization for women, active in the city of Charleston, South Carolina founded in 1813 and has remained active for more than two hundred twelve years in serving the “poor sick.”

The LBS was founded by white, elite women of Charleston. The initial purpose was to provide help to the needy after the War of 1812, but in contrast to its predecessors, it was to become the first permanent charitable organization by women in Charleston.

LBS conducted charity among the “sick poor” in Charleston, founded upon the ideal of Christian charity. The foremost focus of the LBS was poor white women, although they also helped free coloured women as well. LBS aimed to offer care for "anyone who did not fall within the purview of the almshouse, dispensary, or slave hospital.” The ladies cared for Blacks if they were freed and did not ask for information about how that freedom was obtained in the name of "southern tradition". The ladies would visit the ill and provide them with sugar, coffee, blankets, soaps, among other comforts. It played an important role in the life of the pre-Civil War city. In Antebellum Charleston, there were few occupations available for uneducated poor women who needed to support themselves. Normally in the 19th century, this category of women would be working as domestic servants, but in the Antebellum South, the planter aristocracy owned enslaved people and did not employ free domestic maids, and consequently, poor uneducated white women were, to a large degree, dependent upon charity.

The LBS played a pioneering role as one of the first public organisations in Antebellum South Carolina which was managed by women. In Antebellum South, where women's public participation in society was controversial, LBS was an important organization founded and managed by women which played an active part in society and managed its own independent finances. For example, the organization required that the Treasurer must be single. They did not want a man, a husband, to have easy access to the money collected by the members. It was the local version of a number of local organisations of the same kind, also called "Ladies Benevolent Society", which was founded around the United States at that time. It was the first of the three leading women's organisations in Antebellum Charleston, the other being Ladies Fuel Society (LFS) from 1830 and Female Charitable Association (FCA) from 1824.

The Ladies Benevolent Society provided an estimated 10% of charity proceeds in Charleston at the time. With the rise of other charitable groups such as the Sisters of Charity of Our Lady of Mercy and the Methodist Benevolent Society during the mid-19th century, the Ladies Benevolent Society’s community supported shifted to providing home health care nurses.

LBS has remained an active society contributing to the poor sick of Charleston since it was founded. Buoyed by an inheritance from the Dill Sisters, the Society continues its work into the twenty-first century with grants to support the salaries of nurses at agencies serving indigent residents, as well as purchasing needed supplies.
