= St. Mary of the Annunciation Catholic Church (Charleston, South Carolina) =

Historic church in South Carolina, United States

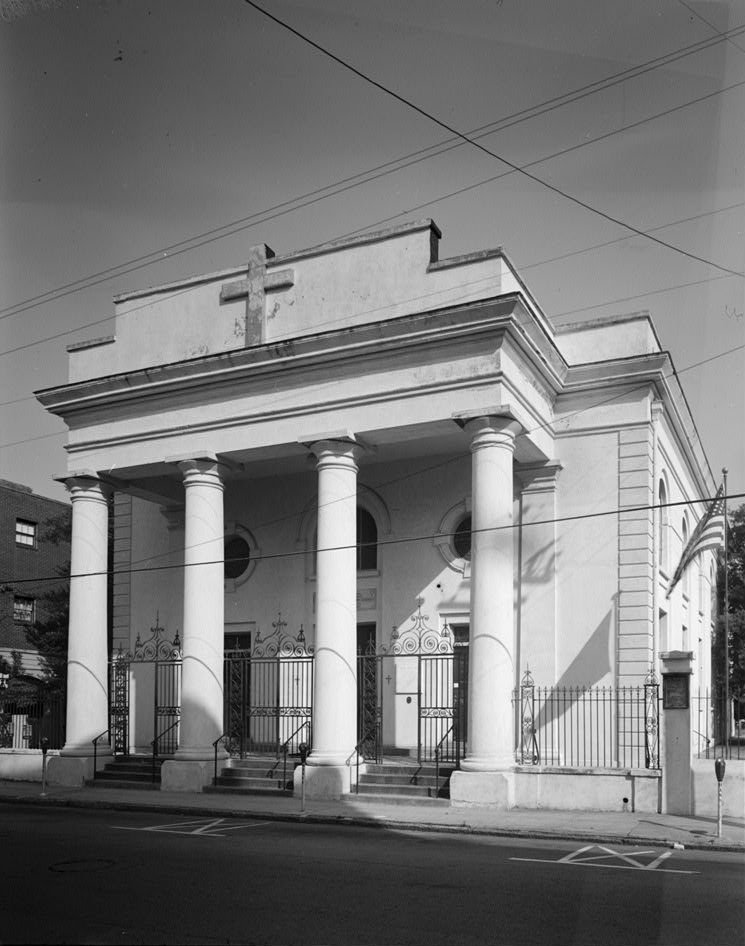
- St. Mary of the Annunciation Catholic Church

Religion
- Affiliation: Catholic Church
- Diocese: Diocese of Charleston
- Ecclesiastical or organizational status: Parish
- Leadership: Rev. Father H. Gregory West, JCL, Pastor: Rev. Father Patrick Allen, Parochial Vicar

Location
- Location: 93 Hasell St. Charleston, South Carolina, United States of America
- Interactive map of St. Mary of the Annunciation Catholic Church
- Coordinates: 32°46′54.6″N 79°55′58″W

Architecture
- Style: Greek
- Completed: 1839

Specifications
- Capacity: 350
- Length: 84 ft (25.6 m)
- Width: 50 ft (15.2 m)
- Materials: Stucco over brick

U.S. National Register of Historic Places
- Added to NRHP: November 7, 1976
- NRHP Reference no.: 76001697

Website
- St. Mary's website

St. Mary of the Annunciation Catholic Church is a Catholic church in Charleston, South Carolina, and was the first Catholic parish established in the Carolinas and Georgia. The current building at 93 Hasell Street is the third structure to house the congregation on this site.

== History ==
The property and an old building were purchased in 1789. It was incorporated as the Catholic church in Charleston by the South Carolina General Assembly in 1791. The first structure was replaced by a brick church that burned in the Charleston fire in 1838.

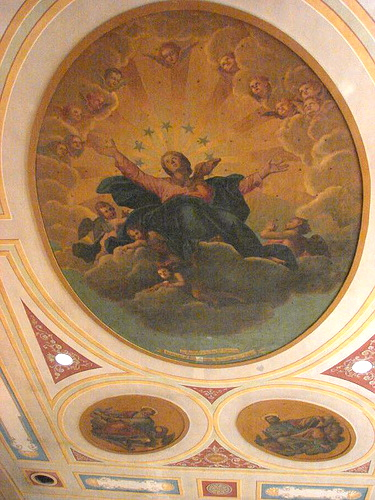
Ceiling mural depicting the Assumption of Mary

The church was rebuilt quickly and reopened on June 9, 1839. It is a rectangular building, 84 ft (25.6 m) by 50 ft (15.2 m). It is built of brick with a stucco covering. There are four Doric columns that support a large entablature. The parapet wall at the top of the church was probably constructed around 1896. There are stained glass windows imported from Munich.

The nave has a central aisle and two large rows of pews. There are smaller pews along the side aisles. Above the altar, there is a painting of the Crucifixion by John S. Cogdell. The artist donated this painting to replace an earlier painting he had done in 1814, which was destroyed in the fire. Much of the interior of the church was renovated during a three-month renovation in 1884. The church graveyard is on each side and to the rear of the church.

In the early 1980s, the neighboring Charleston Place complex was constructed, bordering the church on all sides. It was the only structure preserved on the lot, besides the few storefronts facing Meeting Street which were incorporated in the parking structure.

The St. Mary's Church is on the National Register of Historic Places, No. 76001697. The South Carolina Department of Archives and History has additional pictures and information. and copies of the nomination forms. There are additional pictures and information available from the Historic American Buildings Survey at the Library of Congress.
