= Diocese of Charleston =

Latin Catholic jurisdiction in South Carolina

Coordinates: 32°46′33″N 79°56′03″W

Diocese of Charleston Dioecesis Carolopolitana
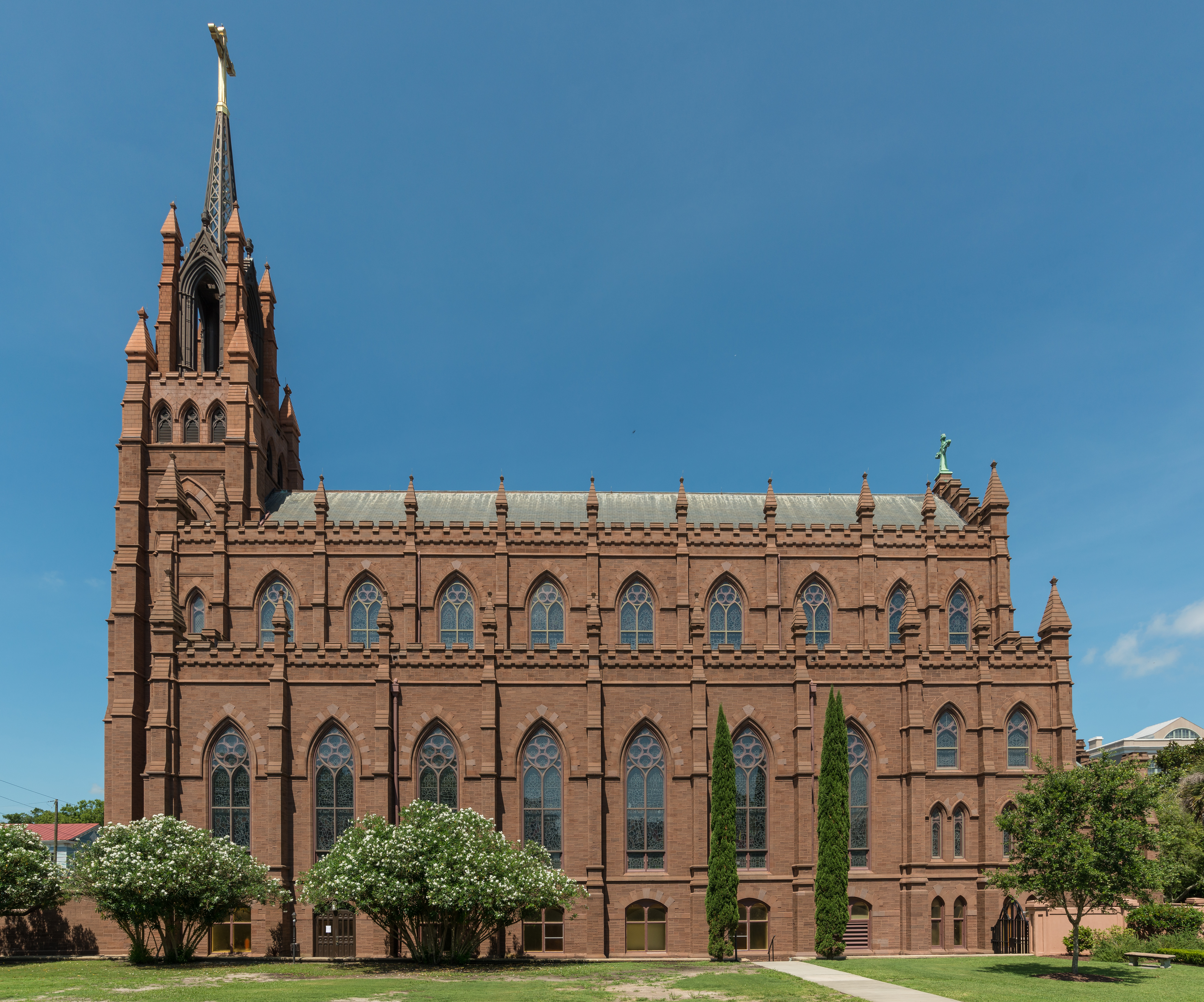
- Cathedral of St. John the Baptist

- Coat of arms

Location
- Country: United States
- Territory: South Carolina
- Ecclesiastical province: Atlanta
- Metropolitan: Archdiocese of Atlanta

Statistics
- Area: 31,055 sq mi (80,430 km^{2})
- Population: Total; Catholics: (as of 2023); 5,282,634; 205,947 (3.9%)

Information
- Denomination: Catholic
- Sui iuris church: Latin Church
- Rite: Roman Rite
- Established: July 11, 1820
- Cathedral: Cathedral of Saint John the Baptist
- Patron saint: St. John the Baptist(Primary); St. Finbar (Secondary)

Current leadership
- Pope: Leo XIV
- Bishop: Jacques E. Fabre
- Metropolitan Archbishop: Gregory John Hartmayer
- Vicar General: Gregory Wilson; D. Anthony Droze
- Bishops emeritus: Robert E. Guglielmone

Map
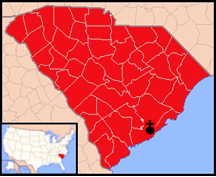

Website
- charlestondiocese.org

The Diocese of Charleston (Latin: Dioecesis Carolopolitana) is a diocese of the Catholic Church for the state of South Carolina in the United States; its territory includes the entire state of South Carolina. It is a suffragan diocese of the Archdiocese of Atlanta. The bishop is Jacques Fabre-Jeune.

== History ==
=== 1700 to 1820 ===
During the 18th century, present-day South Carolina was a British colony in North America. The few Catholics in the British colonies were under the jurisdiction of the Apostolic Vicariate of the London District in England. However, in 1716 the colonial assembly in the Province of South Carolina had banned Catholics immigrating into the colony, out of fear they would conspire with the Catholic Spanish nearby in Florida. In 1756, a few French Catholic refugees arrived in South Carolina after the British expelled them from the former French colony of Acadia.

With the end of the American Revolution in 1783 and the passage of the U.S. Constitution in 1789 Catholics were guaranteed freedom of worship throughout the new nation. To remove Catholics in the United States from British jurisdiction, Pope Pius VI in 1784 erected the Prefecture Apostolic of the United States in 1784, encompassing the entire nation. Five years later, he converted the prefecture into the Diocese of Baltimore.

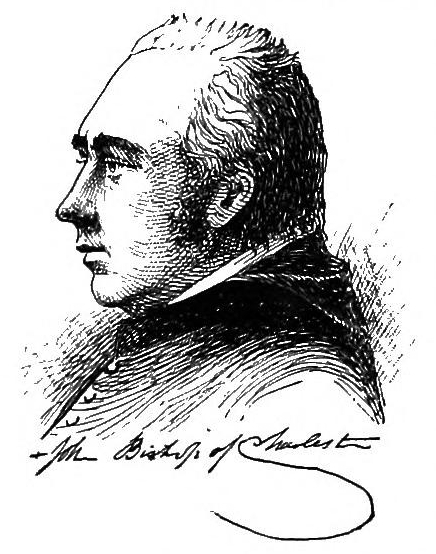
Bishop England (1842)

=== 1820 to 1843 ===
The Diocese of Charleston was erected by Pope Pius VII on July 11, 1820. He removed the states of Georgia, North Carolina, and South Carolina from what was now the Archdiocese of Baltimore to form the new diocese. Pius VII designated Charleston as a suffragan diocese of Baltimore and appointed John England from the Diocese of Cork in Ireland as its first bishop.

Soon after his arrival in Charleston, England starting traveling through his large diocese to meet with his parishioners. He went wherever he heard there were Catholics. Once he found these groups, he ministered to their needs, appointed catechism teachers, and encouraged them to build churches. During these pastoral visits, England preached in halls, court houses, and state houses. He even preached in Protestant chapels and churches at the invitation of their pastors. During his first years in the diocese, England traveled to Savannah and Augusta in Georgia and Columbia in South Carolina. He spoke with African-Americans, Cherokee people, Catholics who married non-Catholics and non-practicing Catholics.

In 1824, the diocese began work on St. Peter's Church in Columbia. The construction of railroads in the Midlands region of South Carolina led to an influx of Irish Catholic families there, prompting England to assign the priest James Wallace to that region in 1821. Wallace opened St. Peter's Church in Columbia in 1824, the first Catholic church in that city.

When in Charleston, England preached at least twice every Sunday and delivered lectures on special occasions. Experiencing a shortage of priests in the diocese, England established in 1832 the Philosophical and Classical College and Seminary of Charleston. His plan was to support the seminary with income from the college. He taught college courses on the classics and theology. At its height, the college had 130 students. However, the college raised alarms among some Protestant clergy in Charleston, who warned the public about so-called Papist conspiracies. These attacks eventually reduced the college student body to 30. The seminary graduated many eminent laymen and priests. In the words of Chancellor Kent, "Bishop England revived classical learning in South Carolina". In 1832, England estimated the Catholic population of the diocese at approximately 11,000, with 7,500 in South Carolina, 3,000 in Georgia, and 500 in North Carolina.

England celebrated an early mass in the cathedral for African Americans every Sunday, preaching to them at the mass and at a Vesper service. He usually delivered two afternoon sermons; if he was unable to deliver both sermons, he would cancel the sermon for rich while keeping the one for the poor. During the cholera and yellow fever epidemics in Charleston, England joined his priests and nuns in caring for the sick.

In 1834, England recruited a small group of Ursuline nuns from the convent at Blackrock, Cork in Ireland to come to the diocese to teach and minister. During this time, some slave owners invited England to their plantations to minister to their enslaved people. In 1835, provoked by the American Anti-Slavery Society, an anti-Catholic mob raided the Charleston post office. The next day, the mob marched on England's school for 'children of color.' However, the mob was thwarted by a group of Irish volunteers, led by England, who were guarding the school. Yet soon after this, when all schools for 'free blacks' were closed in Charleston, England was forced to close his. However, he was able to continue the schools for mixed race students. England died in 1842.

Cathedral of Saint John and Saint Finbar, Charleston, South Carolina

=== 1843 to 1950 ===
Pope Gregory XVI in 1843 appointed Ignatius Reynolds from Baltimore to replace England as bishop of Charleston. During his tenure, Reynolds stabilized the diocesan administration. He conducted visitations throughout the diocese, which by 1846 included approximately 12,000 Catholics. Reynolds erased the $14,000 diocesan debt left him by England. In 1850, Pope Pius IX erected the Diocese of Savannah, removing Georgia and Florida from the Diocese of Charleston. Reynolds dedicated the Cathedral of Saint John and Saint Finbar in Charleston in 1854. Reynolds died in 1855.

In 1855, Pius IX appointed Patrick Lynch of Charleston as the new bishop of Charleston.The Charleston fire of 1861 destroyed the Cathedral of Saint John and Saint Finbar, the bishop's residence, and the diocesan library. The siege of Charleston by the Union Army from 1863 to 1865 during the American Civil War closed most of the churches and impoverished their congregations.

The 1865 burning of Columbia by the occupying Union Army destroyed St. Mary's College, the Sisters' Home, and the Ursuline Convent. By the end of the war in 1865, the diocesan debt exceeded $200,000. Lynch began soliciting donations throughout the country to cover the immediate needs of his diocese and to pay off its debt. In 1868, Pius IX erected the Vicariate Apostolic of North Carolina, removing North Carolina from the Diocese of Charleston. The diocese now consisted of only South Carolina. Lynch died in 1882. The Sisters of Our Lady of Mercy in 1882 opened St. Francis Xavier Hospital in Charleston.It is today Bon Secours St. Francis Hospital.

Pope Leo XIII in 1883 appointed Henry P. Northrop, then serving as vicar apostolic of North Carolina, to also serve as bishop of Charlotte. Northrop gave up his post as vicar apostolic in 1888 to only serve in Charleston. When Northrop died in 1916, Pope Benedict XV named William Russell as the new bishop of Charleston. After Russell's death in 1927, Pope Pius XI appointed Emmet M. Walsh of the Diocese of Savannah as his successor.

The Franciscan Sisters of the Poor in 1932 purchased the Emma Moss Booth Hospital in Greenville and renamed it St. Francis Hospital. It is today the Bon Secours St. Francis Downtown Hospital.During his 22-year tenure in Charleston, Walsh erected 25 new churches, as new hospitals, and two vacation camps for youth.The Sisters of Charity of St. Augustine in 1938 opened Providence Hospital in Columbia. It is today MUSC Health Columbia Medical Center Downtown.

=== 1950 to 1989 ===
After appointing Walsh as coadjutor bishop for the Diocese of Youngstown in 1949, Pope Pius XII named John Russell of the Archdiocese of Baltimore in 1950 to succeed him in Charleston. In 1958, Pius XII appointed Russell as bishop of the Diocese of Richmond and named Paul Hallinan from the Diocese of Cleveland as the new bishop of Charleston

Recognized as one of the South's "foremost advocates of social and religious liberalism", Hallinan became known for his personal dedication to the civil rights movement and the cause of racial equality. In 1961, he issued a pastoral letter that said, "With racial tension mounting, the Church must speak out clearly. In justice to our people, we cannot abandon leadership to the extremists whose only creed is fear and hatred." However, Hallinan delayed full racial integration at Catholic institutions in the diocese out of fear for the safety of African American students. Explaining this decision, he said noted that Catholics made up only 1.3% of the state's population. Rushed integration might destroy the diocese's school system and risked harming children, so integration would have been, in the bishop's words, a "hollow victory."

In 1962, Pope John XXIII elevated the Diocese of Atlanta to the Archdiocese of Atlanta. The Diocese of Charleston became a suffragan diocese of the new archdiocese. At the same time, the pope appointed Hallinan as the first archbishop of Atlanta and replaced him in Charleston with Francis Reh of the Archdiocese of New York. Pope Paul VI appointed Reh in 1964 as rector of the Pontifical North American College in Rome. The pope named Auxiliary Bishop Ernest Unterkoefler from Richmond to replace Reh.

An active participant in the American civil rights movement, Unterkoefler worked alongside Dr. Martin Luther King Jr. and ended racial segregation in all Catholic institutions in the diocese. Unterkoefler was also a prominent advocate for restoring the permanent diaconate in the United States, and ordained Joseph Kemper in 1971 as the first permanent deacon in the United States.During his 1987 papal visit to the United States, Pope John Paul II held an audience at St. Peter's Church in Columbia, then led a prayer service at Williams-Brice Stadium at the University of South Carolina in Columbia.

=== 1989 to present ===
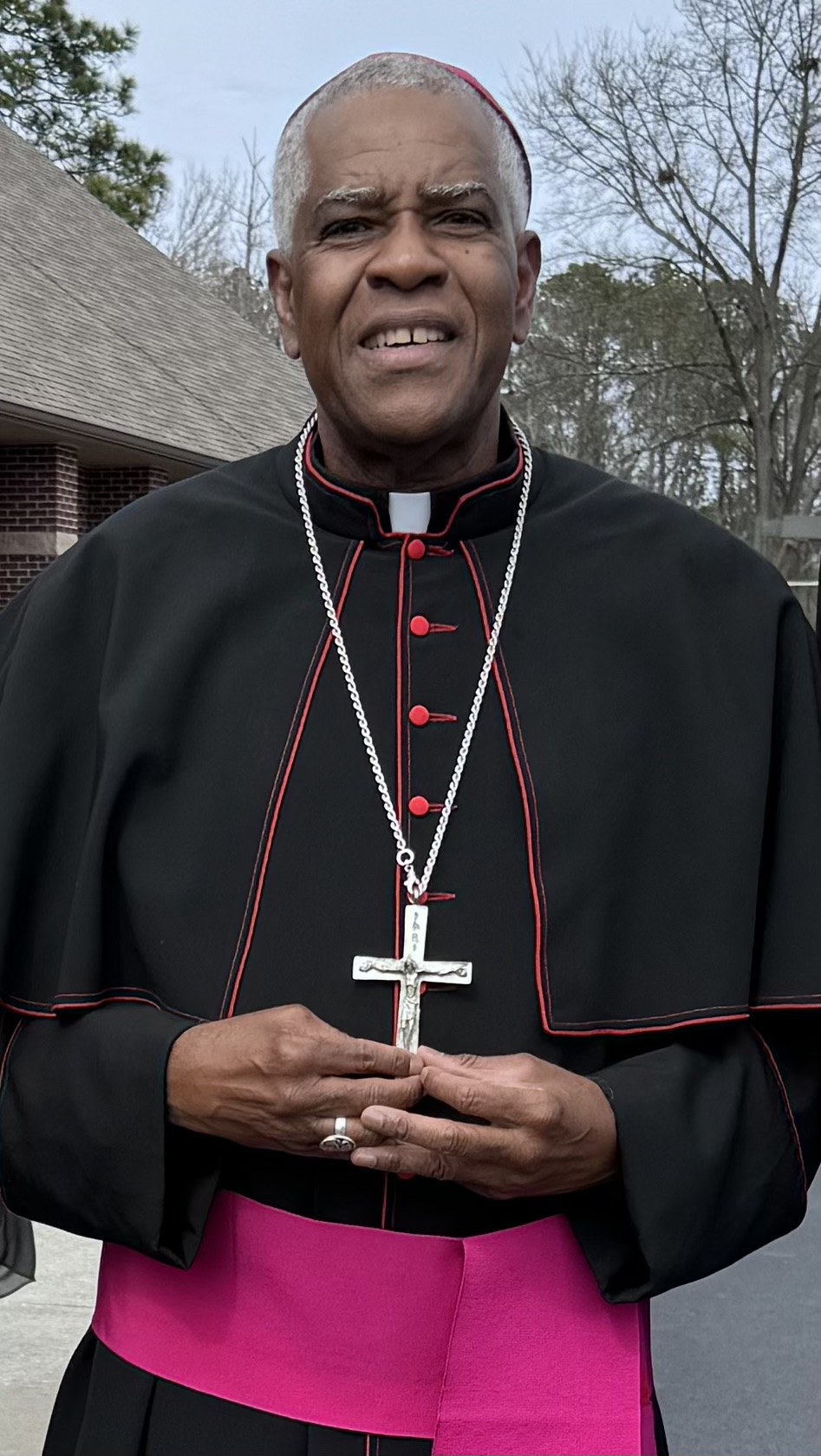
Bishop Fabre-Jeune (2024)

In 1989, John Paul II appointed David B. Thompson of the Archdiocese of Philadelphia to assist Unterkoefler as a coadjutor bishop. After serving for 26 years as bishop of Charleston, Unterkoefler resigned in 1990 and Thompson automatically succeeded him. Thompson retired as bishop in 1999; John Paul II replaced him with Robert Baker from the Diocese of St. Augustine. During his tenure as bishop, Baker dedicated new churches and expanded existing churches, schools, and parish facilities. Baker was named bishop of the Diocese of Birmingham by Pope Benedict XVI in 2007.

In 2009, Benedict XVI appointed Robert Guglielmone from the Diocese of Rockville Centre as the new bishop of Charleston. He retired in 2020 and was replaced by Pope Francis with Jacques Fabre-Jeune of the Diocese of Brooklyn, the first African American to hold that post. In 2021, the diocese joined other Catholic institutions in suing the State of South Carolina in federal court. The issue was a provision in the South Carolina Constitution forbidding the use of public funds for private schools. This provision was blocking the diocese from receiving grants from the 2020 Federal CARES Act.

The Vatican in 2018 declared St. Peter's Church to be a minor basilica; it is now called the Basilica of Saint Peter.Guglielmone in December 2020 set new limits on the use of the Traditional Latin Mass in the diocese, in keeping with the motu proprio Traditionis custodes (Guardians of the tradition), released by Pope Francis. These limits include using the mass for confirmations and the anointing of the sick.

Elizabeth Cox, a teacher at Bishop England High School in Charleston, sued the diocese in July 2019 over its failure to renew her teaching contract. The diocese had reacted to a posting Cox made on Facebook indicating her support for abortion rights for women. She claimed that her firing violated South Carolina law and her first amendment protections under the US Constitution.In June 2022, a federal judge dismissed a class action suit against Bishop England High School and the diocese. The plaintiffs claimed that the windows in the staff offices and the girls and boys locker rooms were deliberately installed so as to allow voyeurism.

=== Cathedrals ===
Consecrated in 1854, the Cathedral of Saint John and Saint Finbar was the first proper cathedral of the diocese. It was destroyed in the Charleston fire of 1861. The Cathedral of Saint John the Baptist was constructed on the site of Saint John and Saint Finbar. Before the Diocese of Raleigh was formed, the Diocese of Charleston had a pro-cathedral in Wilmington, North Carolina, that is now the Basilica Shrine of St. Mary.

=== Sexual abuse ===
Frederick J. Hopwood pleaded guilty in 1994 to committing a lewd act upon a minor in return for a grant of immunity from prosecution for other sex abuse crimes. Other victims of Hopwood soon came forward.

In 2007, Bishop Baker settled the existing sexual abuse lawsuits against the archdiocese, paying $12 million total to all victims with credible accusations who were born before 1980. This settlement compensated several of Hopwood's victims. A new lawsuit was filed in 2017 against the diocese by more alleged victims of sexual abuse. These plaintiffs, who had moved out of state after the abuse happened, faulted the diocese for not conducting a nationwide search for victims when they made the 2007 settlement.

In March 2019, the diocese published the names of 42 diocesan clergy who were "credibly accused" of committing acts of sex abuse. In August 2019, a new report revealed that Bishop Guglielmone was being sued in New York for alleged sexual abuse in the Diocese of Rockville Centre. In December 2020, a Vatican-ordered investigation into the charges against Guglielmone found no substance to them.

Jeffrey Scofield, an employee of Bishop England High School in Charleston, pleaded guilty in June 2020 to one count of voyeurism and received 18 months of probation. On one occasion in 2019, Scofield used a smartphone to record through a window boys changing in their locker room at the school. A student using the device later noticed the pornographic images and reported it to the school.

In November 2020, Jacob Ouellette, the director of youth ministry at Our Lady of the Sea Parish in North Myrtle Beach, was arrested on charges of criminal sexual conduct, two counts of criminal solicitation of a minor, and first-degree sexual exploitation of a minor on the internet.Jamie Adolfo Gonzalez-Farias, a visiting priest from Chile, pleaded guilty in August 2023 to transporting a minor with intent to engage in criminal sexual activity. Gonzalez-Farias had taken an 11-year-old from South Carolina to Florida, where he touched the child inappropriately. The diocese was informed of the crime in December 2020 and immediately notified police. Gonzalez-Farias returned to Chile.

== Bishops of Charleston ==
1. John England (1820-1842)
  - William Clancy (coadjutor bishop 1834–1837; appointed apostolic vicar of British Guiana before succession)
2. Ignatius A. Reynolds (1844-1855)
3. Patrick N. Lynch (1858-1882)
4. Henry P. Northrop (1883-1916)
5. William Thomas Russell (1917-1927)
6. Emmet M. Walsh (1927-1949), appointed coadjutor bishop of Youngstown and subsequently succeeded to that see
7. John J. Russell (1950-1958), appointed bishop of Richmond
8. Paul John Hallinan (1958-1962), appointed archbishop of Atlanta
9. Francis Frederick Reh (1962-1964), appointed rector of the Pontifical North American College in Rome and later bishop of Saginaw
10. Ernest Leo Unterkoefler (1964-1990)
11. David B. Thompson (1990-1999; coadjutor bishop 1989–1990)
12. Robert J. Baker (1999-2007), appointed bishop of Birmingham
13. Robert E. Guglielmone (2009–2022)
14. Jacques E. Fabre, (2022–present)

=== Other diocesan priests who became bishops ===
- John Barry, appointed bishop of Savannah in 1857
- Joseph Bernardin, appointed auxiliary bishop of Atlanta in 1966, archbishop of Cincinnati in 1972, and archbishop of Chicago in 1982; became cardinal in 1983.
- John James Joseph Monaghan, appointed bishop of Wilmington in 1897
- John Moore, appointed bishop of Saint Augustine in 1877
- (Abbot Emeritus Edmund F. McCaffrey was incardinated in this diocese in 1993.)

== Departments ==
=== Parishes ===
See List of Roman Catholic churches in the Diocese of Charleston

=== Magazine ===
The Catholic Miscellany, successor to the U.S. Catholic Miscellany, the first Catholic newspaper in the United States, is the diocese's official magazine.

== Education ==
=== Diocesan high schools ===
- Bishop England High School – Charleston
- Cardinal Newman School – Columbia
- John Paul II Catholic School – Okatie (Beaufort and Jasper counties)

=== Private high schools ===
- Seton Catholic – Myrtle Beach, South Carolina
- St. Joseph's Catholic School – Greenville
