= Joseph Howard Hodges =

American prelate

His Excellency, The Most Reverend Joseph Howard Hodges
- Bishop of Wheeling-Charleston titular bishop of Rusadus
- See: Diocese of Wheeling-Charleston
- In office: November 23, 1962 - January 17, 1985
- Predecessor: John Joseph Swint
- Successor: Francis B. Schulte
- Previous posts: Auxiliary Bishop of Richmond (1952 to 1961); Coadjutor Bishop of Wheeling (1961 to 1962)

Orders
- Ordination: December 8, 1935 by Francesco Marchetti Selvaggiani
- Consecration: October 15, 1953 by Peter Leo Ireton

Personal details
- Born: October 8, 1911 Harpers Ferry, West Virginia, USA
- Died: January 27, 1985 (aged 73) Wheeling, West Virginia, USA
- Buried: Mount Calvary Chapel, Wheeling
- Denomination: Roman Catholic
- Parents: Joseph Howard and Edna Belle (née Hendricks) Hodges
- Education: St. Charles College; Pontifical North American College
- Motto: Caritas vincit omnia (Love conquers all)

Joseph Howard Hodges (October 8, 1911 – January 27, 1985) was an American prelate of the Roman Catholic Church. He served as bishop of the Diocese of Wheeling-Charleston from 1962 until his death in 1985. He previously served as an auxiliary bishop of the Diocese of Richmond in Virginia from 1952 to 1961 and as coadjutor bishop of Wheeling from 1961 to 1962.

== Biography ==
=== Early life ===
Joseph Hodges was born on October 8, 1911, in Harpers Ferry, West Virginia to Joseph Howard and Edna Belle (née Hendricks) Hodges. His family later moved to Martinsburg, West Virginia, where he attended St. Joseph's High School. After graduating from St. Joseph's in 1928, Hodges studied at St. Charles College in Catonsville, Maryland (1928–1930). He was then sent to further his studies at the Pontifical North American College in Rome.

=== Priesthood ===
Hodges was ordained to the priesthood by Cardinal Francesco Marchetti Selvaggiani for the Diocese of Richmond in Rome on December 8, 1935. Following his return to Virginia, Hodges was appointed as curate at Sacred Heart Parish in Danville, Virginia. In 1939, he was assigned to St. Andrew's Parish in Roanoke, Virginia, then in 1945 became director of the diocesan mission band. Hodges was named pastor of St. Peter's Parish in Richmond, Virginia, in 1955.

=== Auxiliary Bishop of Richmond ===
On August 8, 1952, Hodges was appointed as an auxiliary bishop of Richmond and titular bishop of Rusadus by Pope Pius XII. He received his episcopal consecration at the Cathedral of the Sacred Heart in Richmond, Virginia, on October 15, 1952, from Bishop Peter Ireton, with Bishops Vincent Waters and John Dearden serving as co-consecrators. In addition to his episcopal duties, Hodges continued to serve as pastor of St. Peter's.

=== Coadjutor Bishop and Bishop of Wheeling-Charleston ===
Hodges was named as coadjutor bishop of what was then the Diocese of Wheeling by Pope John XXIII on May 31, 1961. Upon the death of Archbishop John Swint, Hodges automatically succeeded him as the fifth bishop of Wheeling on November 23, 1962.Hodges attended all four sessions of the Second Vatican Council in Rome between 1962 and 1965. He dedicated much of his administration to implementing the reforms of the Council in the diocese, establishing a Liturgical Commission, Priests' Senate, Sisters' Council, and Cursillo movement.

A strong supporter of ecumenism, Hodges established a Commission for Religious Unity in 1964, co-founded the Joint Commission of Roman Catholics and Episcopalians in 1978 with the episcopal bishop of West Virginia, and joined the West Virginia Council of Churches in 1981. He mandated parish councils in 1968, introduced extraordinary ministers in 1970 and permanent deacons in 1975, and renovated the exterior and interior of St. Joseph's Cathedral in Wheeling in 1973.

The Vatican renamed the Diocese of Wheeling as the Diocese of Wheeling-Charleston on August 21, 1974. In 1976, Hodges established the diocesan Pro-Life Office and led a public protest against the opening of a health clinic in Wheeling that provided abortion services to women. Hodges was also known as a social reformer, using his office to challenge the social, economic, and political injustice in Appalachia.

Hodges publicly supported the American civil rights movement, urged local parishes to begin social outreach programs, and established such social ministry programs as kitchens to serve the hungry and elderly-assistance programs. He served as chairman of the USCCB Ad Hoc Committee for the Campaign for Human Development.

== Death ==
Joseph Hodges died on January 27, 1985, from lung cancer at Wheeling Hospital in Wheeling at age 73. He is buried at Mount Calvary Cemetery Bishop's Chapel in Wheeling.

== See also ==
Catholic Church titles
Preceded by John Joseph Swint	Bishop of Wheeling-Charleston; 1962—1985	Succeeded by Francis B. Schulte
