= James Louis Flaherty =

American Catholic bishop (1910–1975)

His Excellency, The Most Reverend James L. Flaherty
- Auxiliary Bishop of Richmond
- Church: Catholic Church
- See: Titular See of Tabuda
- Appointed: August 8, 1966
- In office: October 15, 1966 - August 9, 1975

Orders
- Ordination: December 8, 1936 by Francesco Marchetti Selvaggiani
- Consecration: October 15, 1966 by John Joyce Russell

Personal details
- Born: May 13, 1910 Norfolk, Virginia, US
- Died: August 9, 1975 (aged 65)
- Education: College of the Holy Cross; Pontifical North American College; Catholic University of America

James Louis Flaherty (May 13, 1910 – August 9, 1975) was a bishop of the Catholic Church in the United States. He served as an auxiliary bishop of the Diocese of Richmond in Virginia from 1966 to 1975. During World War II, Flaherty was decorated for gallantry while serving as a US Army chaplain.

== Biography ==
=== Early life ===
James Flaherty was born in Norfolk, Virginia, on May 13, 1910. He attended Saint Mary’s Male Academy and then Matthew Fontaine Maury High School, both in Norfolk. In 1927, he entered the College of the Holy Cross in Worcester, Massachusetts. After his graduation in 1933, he went to Rome to study at the Pontifical North American College, finishing in 1937.

=== Priesthood ===
Flaherty was ordained a priest on December 8, 1938, for the Diocese of Richmond in Rome by Cardinal Francesco Marchetti Selvaggiani.After his ordination, the diocese assigned Flaherty as an assistant pastor at the Cathedral of the Sacred Heart Parish in Richmond.

After the American entry into World War II in 1941, Flaherty enlisted in the US Army Chaplain Corps, serving in the 1st Armored Division. In October 1944, while Flaherty was visiting an Army unit near Castel Gabbiano in Italy, the unit came under artillery fire. Although wounded in the face and neck, he carried wounded men to his jeep and transported them to an aid station. He also provide comfort to wounder and dying men, regardless of denomination. The Army awarded Flaherty the Silver Star for gallantry and later promoted him to major.

Upon his discharge from the Army in 1945 after the end of the war, Flaherty entered the Catholic University of America in Washington, D.C., where he was awarded a Doctor of Psychology degree. He then served in pastoral positions in the diocese.

=== Auxiliary Bishop of Richmond ===
On August 8, 1966 Pope Paul VI appointed Flaherty as the titular bishop of Tabuda and auxiliary bishop of Richmond. He was consecrated by Bishop John Russell on October 15, 1966. The principal co-consecrators were Bishops Vincent Waters of Raleigh and Joseph Hodges.In 1971, he also took the position of pastor at Blessed Sacrament Parish in Norfolk, his home parish.

Flaherty died on August 9, 1975, at age 65.

Catholic Church titles
Vacant Title last held by Teodor Bensch	— TITULAR — Titular bishop of Tabuda; 8 August 1966 – 9 August 1975	Vacant Title next held by Giovanni Innocenzo Martinelli
