= St. Mary's Seminary and University =

Catholic seminary in Baltimore, Maryland, US

- Former names: St. Mary's Seminary and College
- Motto: Apostolica civilisque (Latin)
- Motto in English: Apostolic and public
- Type: Catholic seminary
- Established: October 1791 (235 years ago)
- Affiliations: MSA, ATS, MICUA
- Religious affiliation: Catholic Church (Sulpician Fathers)
- Chancellor: Most Rev. William Lori
- Vice-president: Rev. Hy Nguyen PSS. (Vice Rector)
- President-Rector: Rev. Shawn Gould PSS.
- Students: 71 (Fall 2024)
- Postgraduates: 68
- Doctoral students: 2
- Location: Baltimore, Maryland, United States; 39.3604°N 76.6400°W
- Campus: 40 acres (16 ha)
- Website: www.stmarys.edu

St. Mary's Seminary and University is a Catholic seminary located within the Archdiocese of Baltimore in Baltimore, Maryland; it was the first seminary founded in the United States after the Revolution and has been run since its founding by the Society of the Priests of Saint Sulpice.

== History ==
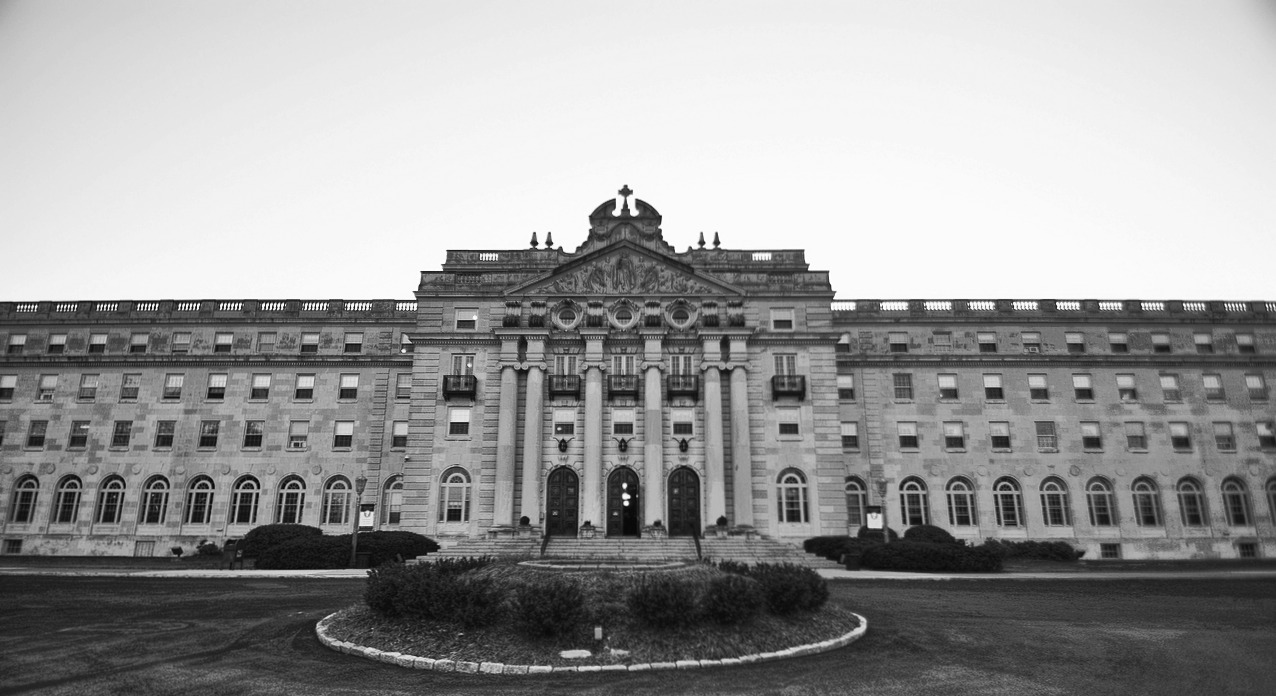
St. Mary's Seminary and University

In consequence of the threatening aspect of affairs in France, Rev. J. A. Emery, Superior-General of the Sulpicians, deemed it prudent to found a house of their institute in some foreign country, and at the suggestion of Cardinal Antonio Dugnani, nuncio at Paris, the United States was chosen. Negotiations were opened with the recently consecrated Bishop John Carroll of Baltimore, Maryland, and after some delay Rev. Francis C. Nagot, S.S., was named first director of the projected seminary. With him were associated Michael Levadoux as treasurer, MM. Tessier, Gamier, and Montdésir, together with several seminarians.

The Sulpicians, fleeing the French Revolution, sailed from Saint Malo on 8 April 1791. Also on board was François-René de Chateaubriand. They arrived in Baltimore on 10 July. They purchased the One Mile Tavern on the edge of the city, dedicated the house to the Blessed Virgin, and in October opened classes with five students whom they had brought from France. This was the beginning of St. Mary's, the first American seminary.

With the help of Bishop John Carroll and others, the Sulpicians were able to purchase additional property adjoining the One Mile Tavern and build St. Mary's College and Seminary on North Paca Street at the developed northwest edge of the newly incorporated city. St. Mary's Seminary Chapel was built. St. Mary's was additionally chartered as a civil college by the State of Maryland in 1805 (1806?). It was operated until 1852 by the Sulpicians religious order and graduated hundreds of young men and formed an important educational role in the growing city during the first half of the 19th century.

St. Mary's was established as a theological seminary in 1822 by Pope Pius VII, when it was authorized as the first ecclesiastical faculty in the United States with the right to grant degrees in the name of the Holy See. The seminary continued to be operated by the Sulpicians. In addition, it maintains an ecclesiastical faculty today.

The under-graduate secular St. Mary's College closed in 1852 and Archbishop Kenrick asked the Jesuits to oversee the formation of a school. Construction of Loyola High School began on Charles Street in early 1852, and on September 15, 1852, the school enrolled its first students. That same year saw the opening of Loyola College in two small rented townhouses on Holliday Street, between East Lexington and East Fayette Streets.

The influence of the St. Mary's Seminary increased in the late 19th century under the leadership of Alphonse Magnien, who served as superior of the school from 1878 to 1902.

St. Mary's Seminary and now University moved to a large 40-acre, park-like campus at the southwest intersection of Roland and Belvedere (later Northern Parkway) Avenues in the Roland Park section of northern Baltimore City in 1929, with the construction of its present Beaux ArtsClassical Revival style, central main building, designed by the firm of Maginnis & Walsh of Boston, which is set far back to the west from Roland Avenue across a great grass lawn. The lawn was used as a helicopter pad for leaving to the local airport following the several days of the 1995 Baltimore visit by Pope John Paul II.

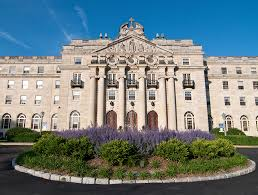
St. Mary's Seminary. America's first seminary, established in 1791.

In 1968, reflecting a more ecumenical and outgoing spirit from the Second Vatican Council and with educational partnerships with neighboring Christian traditions/denominations of (Protestant and Eastern Orthodox) in the City and central Maryland region, plus having additional space and resources due to a decline in the number of priests in formation by the late 1960s, an "Ecumenical Institute of Theology" was established in 1968 with a separate board of trustees of lay and clergy members from the Catholic and other partnering faiths and a separate dean/director and began offering courses, programs, events with library resources and religious training on a graduate-level to the laity and clergy of the area, which has since greatly raised the academic levels and religious discourse in the following four decades.

In 1974, the institution's name was changed to "St. Mary's Seminary and University" to reflect its expanded departments and graduate degree programs.

During his famous visit to the "Premier See" of Baltimore in 1995, the first by any Bishop of Rome, Pope John Paul II, visited briefly and prayed at the Seminary Chapel and used the spacious front lawn to lift off in a helicopter, ending his tour of the Archdiocese of Baltimore. The chapel contains a Casavant Frères pipe organ, originally built in 1954, at a cost $27,000. It had thirty-seven speaking stops. The instrument was played in recital during the Organ Historical Society Convention in July 2024.

Father Robert F. Leavitt retired as long-time president/rector in spring 2007, having served at that position for 27 years—the longest tenure of any president/rector in the school's history. The Seminary's alumni have gone on to reach bishop's positions and form leading teaching roles in various theological seminaries of the Church in many cities and towns of the United States.

== Architecture ==
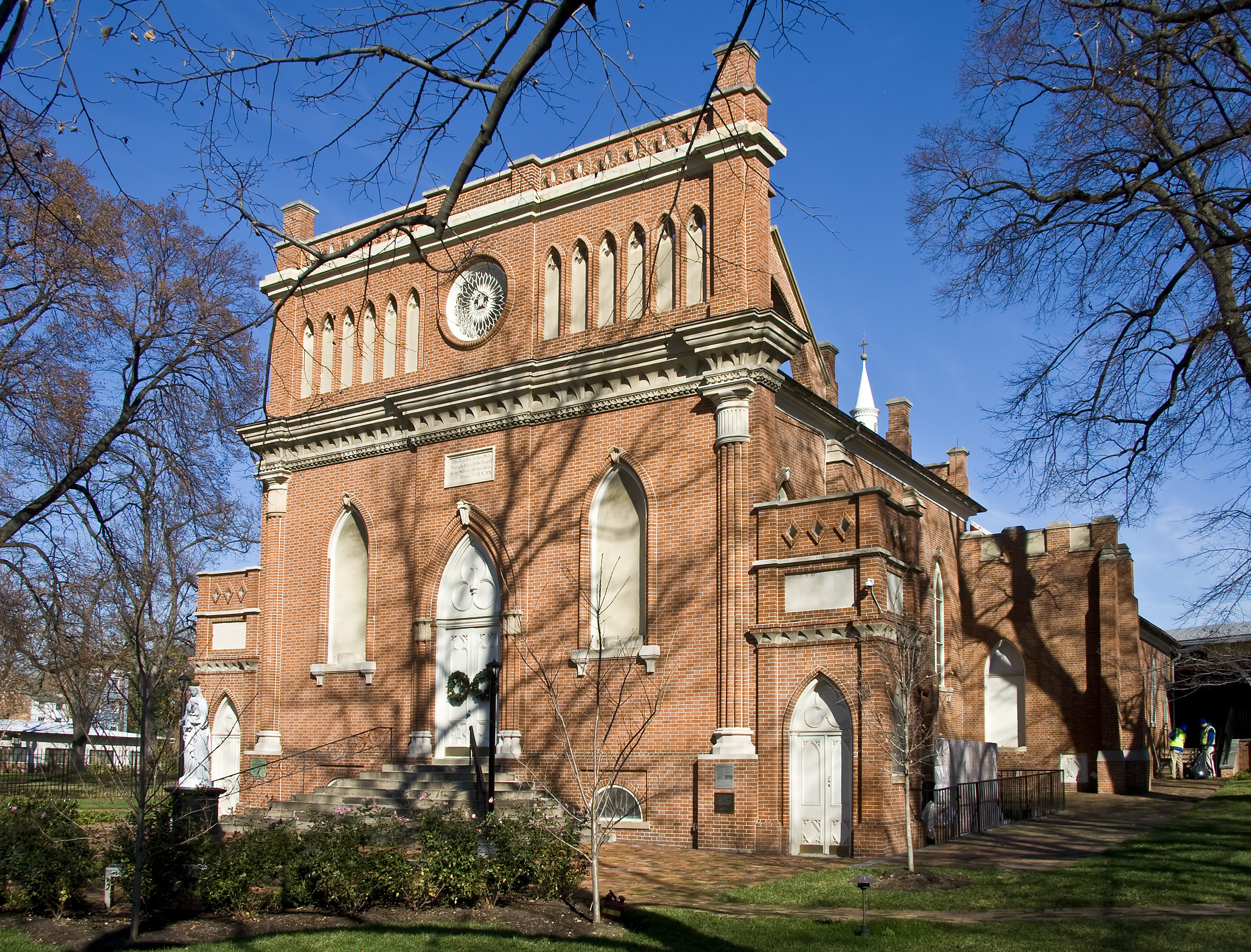
St. Mary's Seminary Chapel

=== St. Mary's Seminary Chapel ===
St. Mary's Seminary Chapel, a Neo-Gothic style church designed by French architect J. Maximilian M. Godefroy was built in 1806. The bricks were originally intended for the Cathedral of the Assumption of the Blessed Virgin Mary, but when Bishop Carroll decided to construct his cathedral in stone, the bricks were purchased by his cousin, Charles Carroll of Carrollton, and donated to the Sulpicians.

Elizabeth Ann Seton, founder of the Sisters of Charity, pronounced vows of chastity and obedience to John Carroll for one year in the lower chapel on Paca Street on March 25, 1809. The chapel's basement was used for services for members of the Afro-Haitian Catholic community who had left Santo Domingo because of the Haitian Revolution. The old Godefroy Chapel is now St. Mary's Spiritual Center and Historic Site.

=== Mother Seton House ===
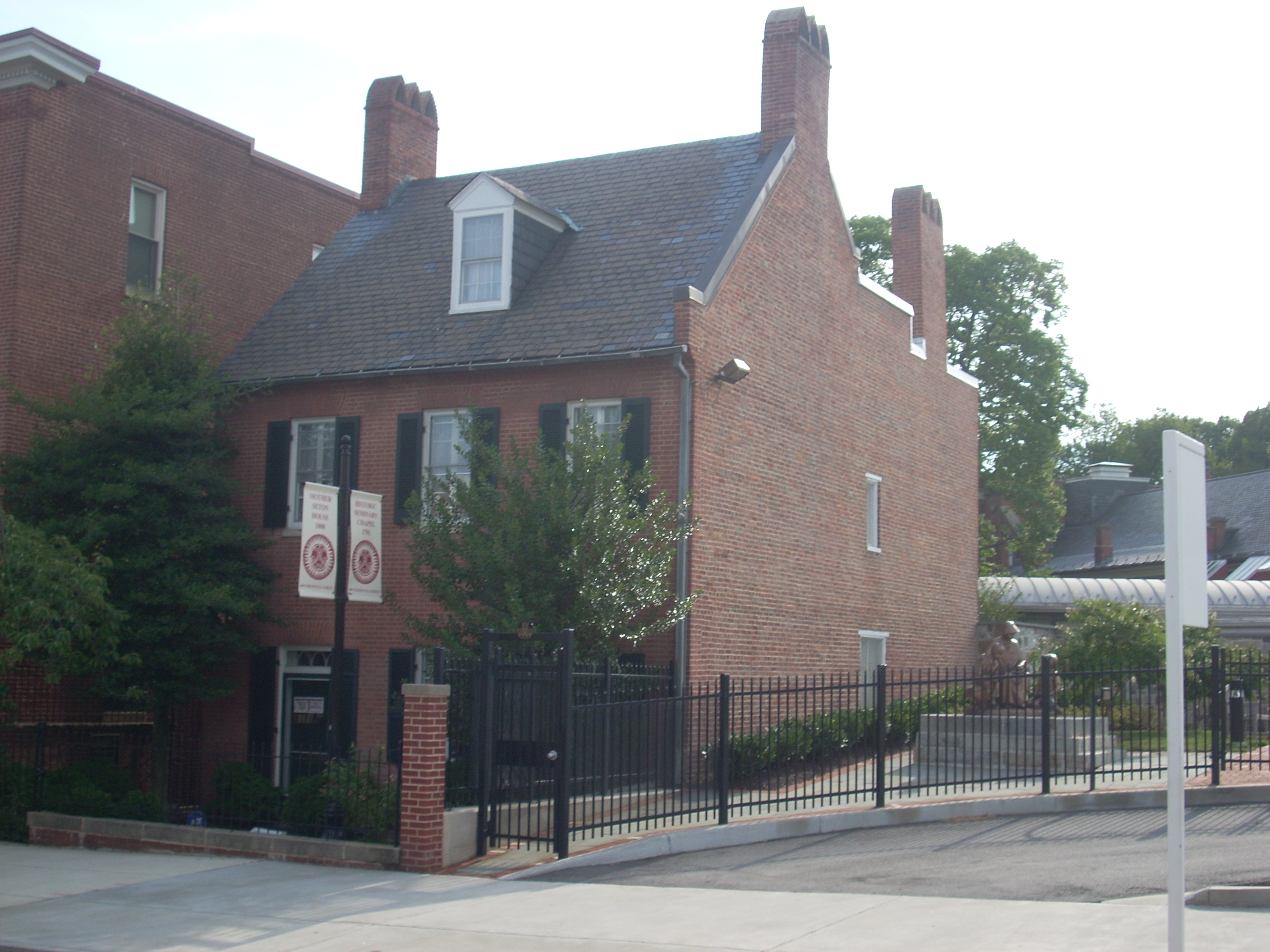
Mother Seton House

Mother Seton House is a historic home located on the grounds of St. Mary's Seminary adjacent to the Seminary Chapel. Around 1806, Elizabeth Ann Seton met Abbé Louis William Valentine DuBourg when he was preaching in New York. DuBourg was at that time president of St. Mary's College, and was interested in establishing a small school for children. With the concurrence of Bishop Carroll, he invited Seton to Baltimore, where her sons were enrolled in the college. She arrived on June 16, 1808, and spent one year as a school mistress, before relocating to Emmitsburg.

St. Elizabeth Ann Seton, lived at the nearby house while she was briefly living in Baltimore during 1806 to 1809; it was later named for her and now contains some historical and biographical exhibits on her life and work. It is the only part of the first group of original seminary/college buildings in Georgian/Federal red brick style from the 1810s which were later razed and a second set of Seminary buildings in a Victorian/French Second Empire style of architecture were erected on the same site facing east on North Paca Street in 1878 and surrounded the original Chapel that is remaining on Paca facing west, into the 21st century.

== Institutes and facilities ==
The Knott Library (endowed by industrialist, contractor/builder, and philanthropist Henry J. Knott) at St. Mary's Seminary and University houses the collected papers of Fr. Raymond E. Brown S.S. (S.T.B., 1951), an eminent Johannine scholar and St. Mary's graduate.

St. Mary's Ecumenical Institute, founded in 1968, offers graduate degrees and certificates; it supports a diverse adult learning environment of different ethnicities and denominations. Dr. Brent Laytham, formerly of North Park University, is the E.I.'s dean, succeeding Dr. Michael J. Gorman. Gorman remains on the faculty as the inaugural Raymond E. Brown Professor of Biblical Studies and Theology.

In May 2012, N. T. Wright was the keynote speaker for the graduating class at the E.I. and was himself awarded an honorary degree.

== Notable alumni ==
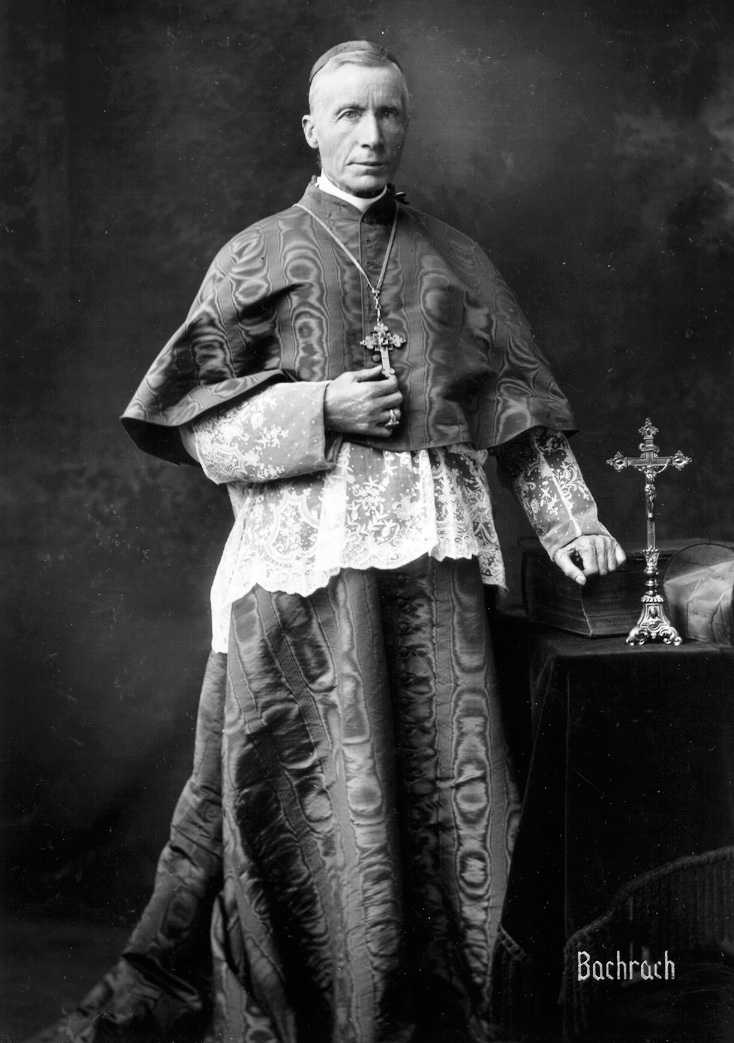
Noted ecumenical American religious leader, Cardinal James Gibbons, Archbishop of Baltimore, entered St. Mary's Seminary in 1857

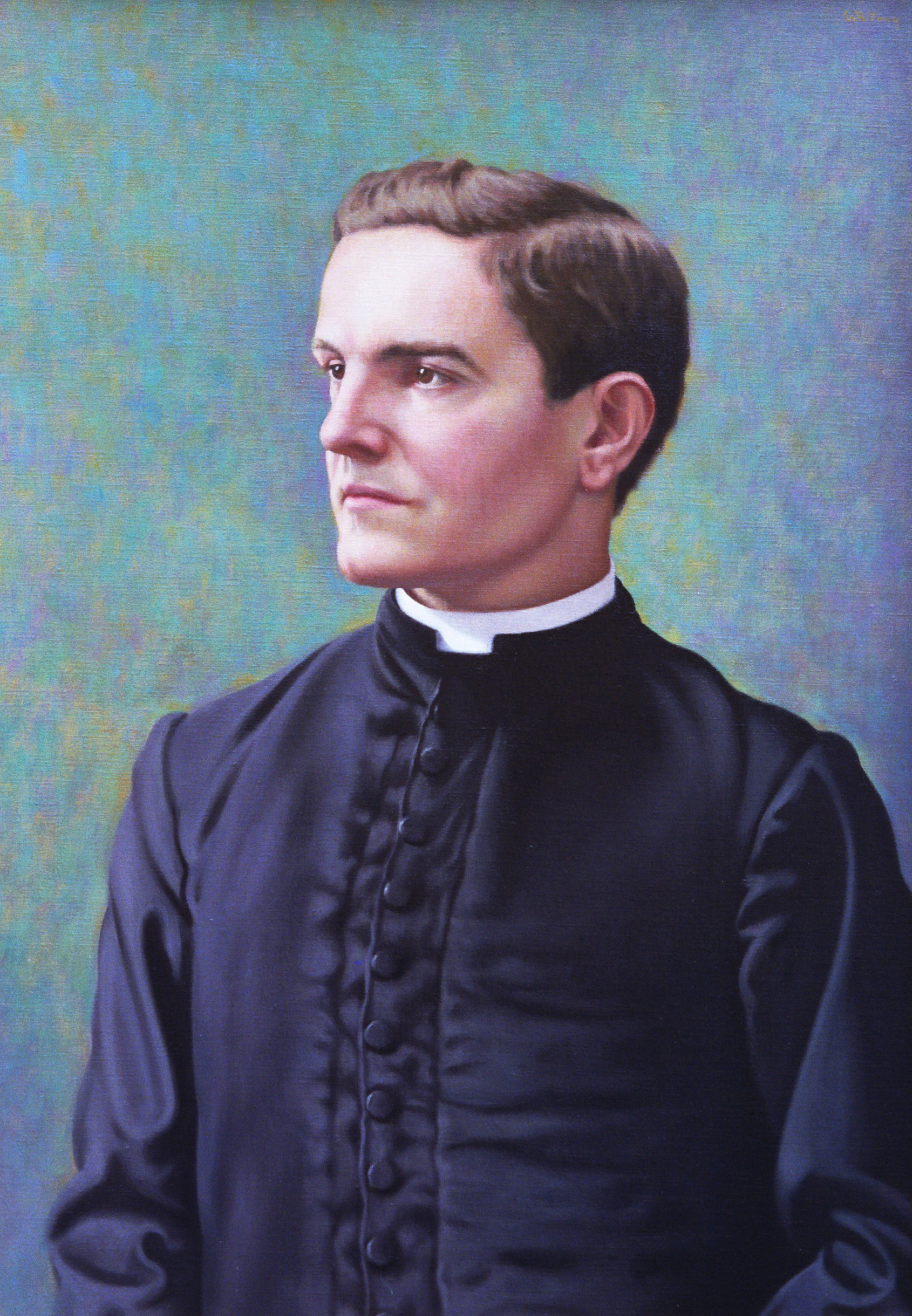
Blessed Michael McGivney - founder of the Knights of Columbus. Attended St. Mary's Seminary from 1873 to 1877

- William O. Brady, (1899–1961), Archbishop of Saint Paul and Minneapolis, in St. Paul, Minnesota
- Raymond E. Brown,(1928–1998), biblical/theological scholar of the Sulpician Fathers, served at the nominally Protestant-led, famous Union Theological Seminary in New York City
- Edward Mann Butler, (1784–1855), first president of the University of Louisville, in Louisville, Kentucky
- Patrick Joseph Byrne, (1888–1950), Maryknoll Missionary who served as Apostolic Delegate to the Republic of Korea, in Seoul
- James Carroll, (1791–1873), U.S. Representative (Congressman) in the twenty-sixth United States Congress (relative of Bishop John Carroll of the Diocese and later Archdiocese of Baltimore), in Baltimore, Maryland
- Samuel Eccleston, (1801–1851), fifth Archbishop of Baltimore, (1831–1854), Baltimore, Maryland
- Terence P. Finnegan, (1904–1990), Chief of Chaplains of the U.S. Air Force, at The Pentagon, U.S. Department of Defense, Washington, D.C.
- John Samuel Foley, (1833–1918), Bishop of Detroit, in Detroit, Michigan
- James Cardinal Gibbons, (1834–1921), ninth Cardinal Archbishop of Baltimore, (1877–1921) in Baltimore, Maryland
- Benjamin Ignatius Hayes, (1815–1877), lawyer, resided in Los Angeles, elected first California District Court Judge of the newly established "First Judicial District of California" from 1852 to 1864 for the southern California Counties of Los Angeles, San Diego and San Bernardino Counties. Writer/Author about early California province, republic and state history plus legal practices, law and precedents.
- Peter Leo Ireton, (1882–1958), Bishop of Richmond, in Richmond, Virginia
- John Joseph Kain, (1841–1903), Archbishop of Saint Louis, in St. Louis, Missouri
- Edward Kavanagh, (1795–1844), seventeenth Governor of Maine at the State Capitol, in Augusta, Maine
- David Kundtz, self-help author and psychotherapist; ordained to the priesthood in 1963 for the Diocese of Boise
- Cornelius Leary (1813–1893), U.S. Representative in the 37th U.S. Congress
- William Francis Malooly, (born 1944), Bishop of Wilmington in Wilmington, Delaware
- Thomas Mardaga, (1913–1984), sixth Bishop of Wilmington in Wilmington, Delaware
- William Matthews, (1770–1854), seventh President of Georgetown College and first British-American-born Catholic priest
- Michael J. McGivney, (1852–1890), American Catholic priest based in New Haven, Connecticut, founded the Knights of Columbus
- Edward Mooney, (1882–1958), Cardinal Archbishop of Detroit, in Detroit, Michigan
- Martin John O'Connor, (1900–1986), bishop and rector of the Pontifical North American College, at Vatican City, in Rome, Italy
- Bernard O'Reilly, (1803–1856), Bishop of Hartford, in Hartford, Connecticut
- Patrick Thomas O'Reilly, (1833–1892), first Bishop of Springfield in Springfield, Massachusetts
- Richard Phelan (1828–1904), Bishop of Pittsburgh in Pittsburgh, Pennsylvania
- Edward Coote Pinkney, (1802–1828), poet, lawyer, sailor, professor, and editor
- John Baptist Pitaval, (1858–1928), Archbishop of Santa Fe in Santa Fe, New Mexico
- Joseph C. Plagens, (1880–1943), Bishop of Grand Rapids in Grand Rapids, Michigan
- Michael Portier, (1795–1859), first Bishop of Mobile in Mobile, Alabama
- Ignatius A. Reynolds, (1798–1855), Bishop of Charleston in Charleston, South Carolina
- John T. Richardson, (1923–2022), President of DePaul University in Chicago, Illinois
- John Joyce Russell, (1897–1993), Bishop of Richmond in Richmond, Virginia
- William Thomas Russell, (1863–1927), Bishop of Charleston, in Charleston, South Carolina
- Venerable Aloysius Philip Schwartz, American Catholic priest, missionary, and founder of the Sisters of Mary
- Augustus John Schwertner, (1870–1939), Bishop of Wichita in Wichita, Kansas
- Jerome Sebastian, (1895–1960), Auxiliary Bishop of the Archdiocese of Baltimore in Baltimore, Maryland
- F. Richard Spencer, (born 1951), current auxiliary bishop of the Archdiocese for the Military Services
- Walter Francis Sullivan, (1928–2012), Bishop of Richmond, in Richmond, Virginia
- John Payne Todd (1792–1852), step-son of fourth President James Madison, (1751–1836, served 1809–1817)
- Thomas Joseph Toolen, (1886–1976), Bishop of Mobile in Mobile, Alabama
- Severn Teackle Wallis (1816–1894), noted lawyer, scholar, civic leader in Baltimore, Maryland
- Vincent Stanislaus Waters, (1904–1974), Bishop of Raleigh in Raleigh, North Carolina
- Joseph Clement Willging, (1884–1959), Bishop of Pueblo in Pueblo, Colorado
- David Zubik, (born 1949), Bishop of Pittsburgh in Pittsburgh, Pennsylvania

== See also ==
- National Catholic Educational Association
