= Francisco González Valer =

Spanish-born American Catholic prelate (1939–2024)

His Excellency, The Most Reverend Francisco González Valer S.F.
- Auxiliary Bishop of Washington; Titular Bishop of Lamphua
- Church: Catholic Church; Latin Church
- Archdiocese: Washington
- Appointed: December 28, 2001
- Installed: February 11, 2002
- Retired: May 27, 2014
- Other post: Titular Bishop of Lamphua (2001‍–‍2024)

Orders
- Ordination: May 1, 1964 by John Joyce Russell
- Consecration: February 11, 2002 by Theodore Edgar McCarrick, James Aloysius Hickey, and Leonard Olivier

Personal details
- Born: May 22, 1939 Arcos de Jalón, Soria, Spain
- Died: March 4, 2024 (aged 84) Barcelona, Spain
- Motto: Pax et amor (Latin for 'Peace and love')

Styles of Francisco González Valer
- Reference style: His Excellency; The Most Reverend
- Spoken style: Your Excellency
- Religious style: Bishop

Francisco González Valer, S.F. (May 22, 1939 – March 4, 2024) was a Spanish-born prelate of the Catholic Church in the United States. González served as an auxiliary bishop of the Archdiocese of Washington, D.C., from 2001 to 2014.

== Biography ==
=== Early life ===
One of five children, Francisco González Valer was born on May 22, 1939, in Arcos de Jalón in the province of Soria, Spain. He had a brother and sister who are both members of Catholic religious orders in Spain. González entered the Seminario Misional de la Sagrada Familia in Barcelona in 1951, and took his final vows in the religious congregation of the Sons of the Holy Family (SF) in 1960.

González came to the United States to study theology at the Catholic University of America, obtaining a Master of Arts degree in comparative international education in 1967.

=== Priesthood ===
On May 1, 1964, González was ordained into the priesthood for the SF by Bishop John J. Russell at Sacred Heart Cathedral in Richmond, Virginia.

In 1966, González became a teacher at the Academy of the Holy Cross in Kensington, Maryland, serving there until 1971. González then held pastoral assignments in the Archdiocese of Santa Fe, also serving as advocate and pro-synodal judge at the archdiocesan marriage tribunal. In 1975, González returned to Spain to teach and perform pastoral work for a year. In 1982, after returning to the United States, the SF assigned González as pastor of Our Lady of Peace Parish in Greeley, Colorado, serving there until 1983.

In 1984, González moved back to Maryland, teaching at St. John's School in Frederick, Maryland. In 1986, He was appointed director of Hispanic, Cursillo, and Charismatic movements in the Archdiocese of Washington. He was named the national chaplain for Cursillo in 1987, serving there until 1989. González was appointed coordinator of the Hispanic Family Life Office in 1992. In 1993, González started writing a weekly column for the El Pregonero newspaper, an archdiocesan newspaper.

The SF in 1996 named González as pastor of Our Lady of Sorrows Parish in Takoma Park, Maryland. The next year, he was transferred to the position of episcopal vicar for Hispanic Catholics. González's congregation elected him three times as a delegate to their General Chapters. He also served as rector of Holy Family Seminary, the SF seminary in Silver Spring, Maryland, and as vice-provincial superior for the SF in the United States until 2001.

=== Auxiliary bishop of Washington ===
On December 28, 2001, Pope John Paul II, appointed González as an auxiliary bishop of Washington and titular bishop of Lamphua. He was consecrated on February 11, 2002, by then Cardinal Theodore McCarrick, with Cardinal James Hickey and Bishop Leonard Olivier serving as co-consecrators, at the Basilica of the National Shrine of the Immaculate Conception in Washington, D.C.. González was the first member of his order to be appointed a bishop.

=== Retirement and death ===
On May 27, 2014, González submitted his letter of resignation as auxiliary bishop of Washington to Pope Francis, having reached the mandatory retirement age for bishops of 75. On October 8, 2021, González moved back to Spain to be with his family.

González died in Barcelona, Spain, on March 4, 2024, at age 84.

== See also ==
- Catholic Church hierarchy
- Catholic Church in the United States
- Historical list of the Catholic bishops of the United States
- List of Catholic bishops in the United States
- Lists of patriarchs, archbishops, and bishops

== Episcopal succession ==
Catholic Church titles
Preceded by —	Auxiliary Bishop of Washington; 2001–2014	Succeeded by —
Preceded by Philip Huang Chao-ming	Titular Bishop of Lamphua; 2001–2024	Succeeded by Vacant
