= Walter Francis Sullivan =

American prelate

His Excellency, The Most Reverend Walter Francis Sullivan
- Bishop of Richmond; Titular Bishop of Selsea
- Church: Roman Catholic Church
- See: Diocese of Richmond
- In office: July 19, 1974 to September 16, 2003
- Predecessor: John Joyce Russell
- Successor: Francis X. DiLorenzo
- Previous posts: Auxiliary Bishop of Richmond; 1970 to 1974.

Orders
- Ordination: May 9, 1953 by Peter Leo Ireton
- Consecration: July 19, 1974 by John Joyce Russell

Personal details
- Born: June 10, 1928 Washington, D.C., U.S.
- Died: December 11, 2012 (aged 84) Richmond, Virginia, U.S.
- Education: St. Mary's Seminary; Catholic University of America
- Motto: To unite all in Christ

Walter Francis Sullivan (June 10, 1928 – December 11, 2012) was an American prelate of the Roman Catholic Church. He served as the eleventh bishop of the Diocese of Richmond in Virginia from 1974 to 2003. Sullivan previously served as an auxiliary bishop of the same diocese from 1970 to 1974.

From 2003 until his death, Sullivan resided in Saint Paul's Parish in Richmond and continued to be active in the diocese, assisting his successor Bishop Francis X. DiLorenzo.

== Biography ==
=== Early life ===
Sullivan was born on June 10, 1928, in Washington, D.C. He attended St. Charles College and St. Mary's Seminary, both in Baltimore, Maryland.

=== Priesthood ===
Sullivan was ordained a priest at the Cathedral of the Sacred Heart in Richmond, Virginia, by Bishop Peter Leo Ireton for the Diocese of Richmond on May 9, 1953. He served as associate pastor at St. Andrew's Parish in Roanoke, Virginia, and St. Mary's Parish in Hampton, Virginia. In 1960, he graduated from the Catholic University of America in Washington, D.C., with a degree in canon law. He became secretary of the diocesan Tribunal in May of that year.Sullivan was named chancellor of the diocese in February 1965 and rector of the cathedral in October 1967.

=== Auxiliary Bishop and Bishop of Richmond ===
On October 15, 1970, Pope Paul VI appointed Sullivan as an auxiliary bishop of Richmond and titular bishop of Selsea. He was consecrated at the Cathedral of the Sacred Heart on December 1, 1970, by Bishop John Russell. On June 4, 1974, Paul VI appointed Sullivan as bishop of Richmond: he was installed on July 19, 1974.

Sullivan served on the boards of the Center for Theology and Public Policy in Washington, D.C.; the Virginia Interfaith Center for Public Policy in Richmond; the Christian Children's Fund in Richmond; the Catholic Committee of Appalachia; and numerous diocesan boards. He was a board member of the National Catholic Office for Persons with Disabilities and the National Conference of Catholic Bishops.

In 1977, Sullivan established a joint Catholic and Episcopalian parish, Holy Apostles in Virginia Beach, Virginia. The church had separate altars for the two denominations. That same year, he established the diocesan Commission on Sexual Minorities to reach out to LGBT Catholics. When the Virginia Holocaust Museum in Richmond was being planned, he made a $50,000 personal donation to it.

Sullivan served as bishop-president of Pax Christi USA, the national Catholic peace movement, from 1991 to 2001. He also served on the writing committee for the 10th anniversary statement of the US Conference of Catholic Bishops' peace pastoral, "The Harvest of Justice is Sown in Peace" (1993).

=== Retirement ===
Sullivan's resignation as bishop of Richmond was accepted on September 16, 2003, by Pope John Paul II. In 2012, despite being debilitated from inoperable liver cancer, Sullivan temporarily left the hospital for a prison visit. On the Sunday before he died, 400 people serenaded him outside his house, singing his favorite hymn, "Sweet, Sweet Spirit." Walter Sullivan died on December 11, 2012, in Richmond at age 84.

== Viewpoints ==
=== War ===
In March 2003, Sullivan criticized the US invasion of Iraq. He said that he regretted "that our nation's leaders have determined that war is necessary to resolve our differences with Iraq."

=== Capital punishment ===
In 2004, Sullivan made this statement about the death penalty:

"They send people to death because it is like a trophy to be exhibited: the more killed, the better it is. Elections are won this way in the United States."

Catholic Church titles
Preceded by John Joyce Russell	Bishop of the Diocese of Richmond; 1974–2003	Succeeded by Francis X. DiLorenzo
Preceded by Thomas Gumbleton	Bishop president of Pax Christi USA; 1991–2001	Succeeded by Gabino Zavala
