= Barry C. Knestout =

Catholic bishop

His Excellency, The Most Reverend Barry Christopher Knestout
- Bishop of Richmond
- Church: Roman Catholic Church
- See: Diocese of Richmond
- Appointed: December 5, 2017
- Installed: January 12, 2018
- Predecessor: Francis X. DiLorenzo
- Previous post: Auxiliary Bishop of Washington and Titular Bishop of Leavenworth (2008-2018)

Orders
- Ordination: June 24, 1989 by James Aloysius Hickey
- Consecration: December 29, 2008 by Donald Wuerl, Francisco González Valer, and Martin Holley

Personal details
- Born: June 11, 1962 (age 64) Cheverly, Maryland, US
- Education: Mount St. Mary's Seminary; University of Maryland
- Motto: Christ our hope

Styles of Barry Christopher Knestout
- Reference style: His Excellency; The Most Reverend
- Spoken style: Your Excellency
- Religious style: Bishop

Barry Christopher Knestout (born June 11, 1962) is an American Catholic prelate who has served as bishop of Richmond in Virginia since 2017.

Previously, Knestout served as the priest secretary for Cardinal James Hickey of Washington and then-Cardinal Theodore McCarrick. Knestout also served as an auxiliary bishop of the Archdiocese of Washington in the District of Columbia, assisting Cardinal Donald Wuerl.

== Biography ==
=== Early life ===
Barry Knestout was born in Cheverly, Maryland, on June 11, 1962, to Thomas and Caroline Knestout. Thomas was a deacon who served as a cryptologist for the National Security Agency and as the director of the Office of the Permanent Diaconate for the Archdiocese of Washington. Barry Knestout has five brothers and three sisters. A younger brother, Mark Knestout, is a priest in the Archdiocese of Washington.

As a child, Barry Knestout lived with his family in Ankara, Turkey, for four years. On returning to the United States, he attended St. Pius X School and Bowie Senior High School, both in Bowie, Maryland. Knestout then studied at the University of Maryland in College Park, Maryland, obtaining a Bachelor of Arts degree in architecture in 1984.

In 1985, having decided to become a priest, Knestout entered Mount St. Mary's Seminary in Emmitsburg, Maryland. He earned a Master of Divinity degree in 1988 and a Master of Theology degree in moral theology in 1989.

=== Priesthood ===
Knestout was ordained to the priesthood for the Archdiocese of Washington at the Cathedral of St. Matthew the Apostle in Washington, D.C., by Cardinal James Hickey on June 24, 1989. After his ordination, the archdiocese assigned Knestout to serve as associate pastor at the following parishes:

- St. Bartholomew in Bethesda, Maryland (1989 to 1993)
- St. Peter in Waldorf, Maryland (1993 to 1994)

Hickey named Knestout as his priest-secretary in 1994, a position he would hold until Hickey's death in 2004. The Vatican raised Knestout to the rank of monsignor in 1999. In 2001, Hickey appointed Knestout as executive director of the archdiocesan office of youth ministry, a post he held for two years. Knestout also served as priest-secretary for McCarrick from 2003 to 2004.

In 2004, the archdiocese assigned Knestout to serve as pastor of St. John the Evangelist Parish in Silver Spring, Maryland. McCarrick appointed him as archdiocesan secretary for pastoral life and social concerns in 2006. In April 2007, Knestout became vicar general and moderator of the curia of the archdiocese.

In 2008, Wuerl appointed Knestout to co-chair the Papal Visit Planning Committee in 2008, overseeing preparations for Pope Benedict XVI's 2008 visit to the United States. In planning the papal visit, Knestout collaborated with his brother Mark, who was director of the archdiocese Office of Worship at the time. Barry Knestout ran a contest for architecture students at The Catholic University of America in Washington to design the altar and chair for the pope to use when celebrating mass at Nationals Park in that city. The Vatican later awarded Knestout a Holy Cross Pro Ecclesia et Pontifice for his work on the papal visit.

=== Auxiliary Bishop of Washington ===
Coat of arms as auxiliary bishop of Washington

On November 18, 2008, Knestout was appointed titular bishop of Leavenworth and an auxiliary bishop of Washington by Benedict XVI. Knestout was consecrated on December 29, 2008, by Wuerl, with Bishops Francisco Valer and Martin Holley serving as co-consecrators, at the Cathedral of St. Matthew the Apostle. Knestout was the first native of Prince George's County in Maryland to serve as a bishop for the archdiocese.

=== Bishop of Richmond ===
On December 5, 2017, Knestout was appointed the 13th bishop of Richmond by Pope Francis. He was installed on January 12, 2018, at the Cathedral of the Sacred Heart in Richmond, Virginia.

In February 2019, Knestout released a list of 42 diocesan priests with credible accusations of sexual abuse of minors. In June 2018, following McCarrick's resignation from the college of cardinals, Knestout denied knowing of any sexual abuse allegations against McCarrick while serving as his priest-secretary:

My first assignment was in 2001 while still serving as priest-secretary to Cardinal James A. Hickey. I was asked to also assist as priest-secretary to his successor, Cardinal McCarrick for six months. Despite the double assignment during those six months, most of my time was spent with the elderly Cardinal Hickey – with whom I worked for nearly a decade. In 2003, I was assigned to the Chancery for a year as one of two priest-secretaries at the time for Cardinal McCarrick as his appointment scheduler. During that year, Cardinal McCarrick traveled frequently in his work with Catholic Relief Services (CRS) and in his other duties as Cardinal.

In May 2020, Knestout suspended Reverend Mark White from ministry for violations of canon law. White had been writing a blog that accused Knestout, Francis and the church hierarchy of covering up McCarrick's crimes. In 2019, Knestout had ordered White to stop writing the blog. When White resumed it later that year, Knestout obtained a trespass order, barring him from church properties. In June 2020, White's petition to the Congregation for Clergy in Rome to remain in his parishes was rejected.

In October 2020, Knestout announced a $6.3 million settlement to 51 people who were sexually abused as children by diocesan clergy. He also established the Independent Reconciliation Program to help heal the victims. In February 2023, Knestout protested a leaked internal memo from the Richmond office of the Federal Bureau of Investigation (FBI). The memo mentioned the Priestly Fraternity of St. Peter (FSSP) and the Society of St. Pius X (SSPX) as possible contact points in the Richmond area for white nationalists. Several days earlier, the FBI had retracted the memo. Knestout in July 2023 announced the suspension from ministry of Reverend Walter Lewis, a retired priest. The diocese had received allegations that Lewis had committed acts of sexual abuse while serving as pastor of St. Anne Parish in Bristol, Virginia.

== Viewpoints ==
=== Abortion ===
In February 2018, Knestout criticized US Senators Tim Kaine and Mark Warner for voting against the proposed Born-Alive Abortion Survivors Protection Act, which failed to pass in the US Senate.

=== Euthanasia ===
Knestout in February 2024 condemned the proposed Death with Dignity bill in the Virginia General Assembly that would have legalized assisted suicide supervised by a physician.

== See also ==
- Catholic Church hierarchy
- Catholic Church in the United States
- Historical list of the Catholic bishops of the United States
- List of Catholic bishops of the United States
- Lists of patriarchs, archbishops, and bishops

Catholic Church titles
Preceded by Francis X. DiLorenzo	Bishop of Richmond; 2018–present	Succeeded by Incumbent
Preceded by –	Auxiliary Bishop of Washington; 2008–2018	Succeeded by -
