= James Flaherty =

James Flaherty may refer to:

- James A. Flaherty (1853–1937), American lawyer and Supreme Knight of the Knights of Columbus
- James Louis Flaherty (1910–1975), American Catholic bishop
- Jim Flaherty (1949–2014), Canadian politician
