= Thomas Quinlan =

Thomas Quinlan may refer to:

- Thomas Quinlan (impresario) (1881–1951), British musical impresario
- Thomas F. Quinlan (1894–1970), Irish Roman Catholic bishop in Korea
- Thomas J. Quinlan (1929–2012), American Roman Catholic priest
