= Andrew Brennan (bishop) =

American Catholic bishop (1877–1956)

His Excellency, The Most Reverend Andrew James Louis Brennan
- Bishop of Richmond titular bishop of Telmissus
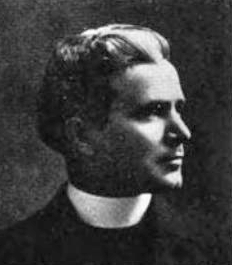
- See: Diocese of Richmond
- Appointed: February 23, 1923
- Installed: May 28, 1926
- Term ended: April 14, 1945
- Predecessor: Denis J. O'Connell
- Successor: Peter Leo Ireton
- Previous posts: Auxiliary Bishop of Scranton; 1923 to 1926

Orders
- Ordination: December 17, 1904 by Pietro Respighi
- Consecration: April 15, 1924 by Michael John Hoban

Personal details
- Born: December 14, 1877 Towanda, Pennsylvania, US
- Died: May 23, 1956 (aged 78) Norfolk, Virginia, US
- Denomination: Roman Catholic
- Parents: James and Ellen (née Flood) Brennan
- Education: College of the Holy Cross (AB); St. Bernard's Seminary; Pontifical North American College (DD)
- Motto: Ut sim fidelis (May I be faithful)

Andrew James Louis Brennan (December 14, 1877 – May 23, 1956) was an American prelate of the Roman Catholic Church. He served as bishop of Richmond in Virginia from 1926 to 1945. He previously served as an auxiliary bishop of the Diocese of Scranton in Pennsylvania from 1923 to 1926.

== Biography ==
=== Early life ===
Andrew Brennan was born on December 14, 1877, in Towanda, Pennsylvania, to James and Ellen (née Flood) Brennan. He studied at the College of the Holy Cross in Worcester, Massachusetts, obtaining a Bachelor of Arts degree in 1900. He then attended St. Bernard's Seminary in Rochester, New York, before going to Rome to study at the Pontifical North American College.

=== Priesthood ===
Brennan was ordained to the priesthood in Rome by Cardinal Pietro Respighi for the Diocese of Scranton on December 17, 1904. He earned a Doctor of Divinity degree in Rome in 1905. Following his return to Pennsylvania, he taught Greek and Latin at St. Thomas College in Scranton, Pennsylvania, from 1905 to 1908. He also served as chancellor of the diocese from 1908 to 1923. While chancellor, Brennan wrote the "Scranton, Diocese of" article for the Catholic Encyclopedia. Brennan served as rector of St. Peter's Cathedral in Scranton from 1914 to 1924.

=== Auxiliary Bishop of Scranton ===
On February 23, 1923, Brennan was appointed auxiliary bishop of the Diocese of Scranton and titular bishop of Thapsus by Pope Pius XI. He received his episcopal consecration at Saint Peter's Cathedral on April 15, 1923, from Bishop Michael John Hoban, with Bishops Bernard Mahoney and John Murray serving as co-consecrators. In addition to his episcopal duties, Brennan served as pastor of St. Mary of Mount Carmel Parish in Dunmore, Pennsylvania.

=== Bishop of Richmond ===
Brennan was appointed the eighth bishop of Richmond on May 28, 1926, by Pius XI. In 1929, at Brennan's suggestion, the Holy Name Society of Richmond establish the Catholic Laymen's League of Virginia. It was created to counteract the flow of anti-Catholic bigotry and misinformation in the local media and from some Protestant ministers. Brennan suffered a paralytic stroke in 1934 and again in 1935.

=== Retirement ===
Pope Pius XII accepted Brennan's resignation as bishop of Richmond for health reasons on April 14, 1945; he was appointed titular bishop of Telmissus on the same date. Andrew Brennan died on May 23, 1956, at St. Vincent de Paul Hospital in Norfolk, Virginia, at age 78.

Catholic Church titles
Preceded by Denis J. O'Connell	Bishop of Richmond; 1926–1945	Succeeded by Peter Leo Ireton
Preceded by –	Auxiliary Bishop of Scranton; 1923–1926	Succeeded by –
