= Holy Cross Regional Catholic School (Lynchburg, Virginia) =

Private Catholic school in Virginia, U.S.

Location
- 2125 Langhorne Road; Lynchburg, Virginia 24501; United States; 37°24′46″N 79°10′40″W

Information
- Type: Private, Coeducational
- Religious affiliation: Roman Catholic
- Established: 1879
- Status: Defunct
- Closed: 2020
- Head of school: Doug Washington
- Chaplain: Father Jim Gallagher
- Grades: PK–12
- Colors: Green and White
- Team name: Gaels
- Accreditation: Southern Association of Colleges and Schools
- Website: hcrs-va.org

Holy Cross Regional Catholic School was a private, Roman Catholic school in Lynchburg, Virginia, for Pre-K through 12th grade. It was in association with the Roman Catholic Diocese of Richmond, which permanently closed the school after years of declining enrollment led to financial exigency.

== Background ==
Holy Cross Regional Catholic School was a college preparatory school for students in pre-Kindergarten through twelfth grade. The school was founded in 1879 by the Daughters of Charity, an order of religious sisters begun by St. Elizabeth Ann Seton. Increased enrollment resulted in a move to in 1960 to a building located on Langhorne Road.

On March 20, 2007, the schools of the Diocese of Richmond, which includes Holy Cross Regional Catholic School, were the first Catholic school system in the nation to receive District Accreditation from the Southern Association of Colleges and Schools and Schools Council on Accreditation and School Improvement (SACS/CASI).

The diocese began allowing the school to get low interest financing in 2012.

=== Closure ===
From 2002 to 2019, the number of students went to 39% of the previous level. In 2019 the enrollment count was 156, with four of them in the 12th grade.

In 2019 the school administration announced that effective the end of the school year in 2020, the school would close forever. In 2021 the diocese sold the property.

In response to the closure of Holy Cross Catholic, a teacher announced plans to create a replacement K-8 school.

== Academics ==
=== Pre-Kindergarten and Kindergarten ===
Full day programs were (8:10-2:50) Monday-Friday. In addition, an After School Program was available for all ages.

Elementary, Grades 1-5

=== Middle School, Grades 6-8 ===
Holy Cross offered a college preparatory middle school program with opportunities to participate in athletics, service projects, volunteer options, and numerous extracurricular activities. Other enrichment opportunities included:

- Accelerated Math Program option
- High school credit opportunities in Math, Foreign Languages, and Science
- Field trips, academic contests, and class retreats

=== High School, Grades 9-12 ===
Holy Cross Catholic School offered a college preparatory curriculum.

- General, Advanced, and Honors Diplomas were available
- Over 60% of the seniors took one or more AP classes
- Dual Enrollment opportunities with Central Virginia Community College
- 100% of the graduating class was accepted into a college or university
- Athletic options included baseball, basketball, golf, soccer, tennis, and volleyball
- Over fifteen academic clubs, performing arts opportunities, and service organizations
