= Francis X. DiLorenzo =

Catholic prelate

His Excellency, The Most Reverend Francis Xavier DiLorenzo
- Bishop of Richmond
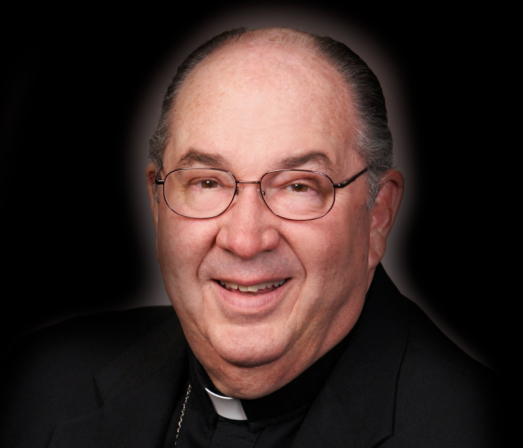
- Church: Catholic Church
- Archdiocese: Baltimore
- Diocese: Richmond
- Appointed: March 31, 2004
- In office: May 24, 2004 — August 17, 2017
- Predecessor: Walter Francis Sullivan
- Successor: Barry C. Knestout
- Previous posts: Auxiliary Bishop of Scranton (1988 to 1994); Bishop of Honolulu (1994 to 2004)

Orders
- Ordination: May 18, 1968 by John Krol
- Consecration: March 8, 1988 by James Timlin, J. Carroll McCormick, and Anthony Bevilacqua

Personal details
- Born: April 15, 1942 Philadelphia, Pennsylvania
- Died: August 17, 2017 (aged 75) Richmond, Virginia
- Education: St. Charles Borromeo Seminary; Alphonsian Academy; Pontifical University of St. Thomas Aquinas
- Motto: Christ our hope

Styles of Francis Xavier DiLorenzo
- Reference style: His Excellency; The Most Reverend
- Spoken style: Your Excellency
- Religious style: Bishop

Francis Xavier DiLorenzo (April 15, 1942 – August 17, 2017) was an American prelate of the Roman Catholic Church. He served as bishop of the Diocese of Richmond in Virginia from 2004 until his death in 2017.

Previously, DiLorenzo was the fourth bishop of the Diocese of Honolulu in Hawaii from 1994 to 2004 and an auxiliary bishop of the Diocese of Scranton in Pennsylvania from 1988 to 1994.

== Biography ==
=== Early life ===
DiLorenzo was born on April 15, 1942, in Philadelphia, Pennsylvania, the oldest of three children of Samuel and Anita Porrino DiLorenzo. He attended St. Callistus School and St. Thomas More High School, both in Philadelphia. He then entered St. Charles Borromeo Seminary in Wynnewood, Pennsylvania.

=== Priesthood ===
DiLorenzo was ordained to the priesthood by Cardinal John Krol in Philadelphia on May 18, 1968, at age 26. DiLorenzo studied in Rome, earning a Licentiate in Sacred Theology from the Alphonsian Academy and a Doctor of Sacred Theology degree from the Pontifical University of St. Thomas Aquinas. DiLorenzo returned to the United States to work at Saint Pius X High School in Pottstown, Pennsylvania as a chaplain and teacher of theology. He later served as chaplain and associate professor of moral theology at Immaculata College in East Whiteland Township, Pennsylvania.

In 1983, Pope John Paul II named DiLorenzo as a chaplain of his holiness. That same year, the archdiocese appointed him as vice rector of St. Charles Borromeo Seminary; he eventually became rector. DiLorenzo also served on the Archdiocesan Committee and was a prosynodal judge of the Metropolitan Tribunal. He was named by the Vatican as a member of the papal household and received the title prelate of honor of his holiness.

=== Auxiliary Bishop of Scranton ===
On January 26, 1988, John Paul II appointed DiLorenzo as an auxiliary bishop of Scranton and titular bishop of Tigias; he was consecrated at Saint Peter's Cathedral in Scranton on March 8, 1988, by Bishop James Timlin.

In 1994, Bishop Joseph Ferrario of the Diocese of Honolulu requested that the Holy See accept his resignation due to poor health. Pope John Paul II appointed DiLorenzo as apostolic administrator of the diocese, while still serving in Scranton, on October 12, 1993.

=== Bishop of Honolulu ===
The coat of arms of Bishop DiLorenzo as bishop of Honolulu from 1994 to 2004.

John Paul II appointed DiLorenzo as bishop of Honolulu on November 29, 1994. His installation included hula dancing. In attendance were Archbishop Agostino Cacciavillan, Cardinal Pio Taofinu'u and Archbishop John R. Quinn. In 1997 DiLorenzo defended the use of hula in a variety of religious services in the diocese despite the Holy See's prohibition on liturgical dance, calling the hula a native "sacred gesture".

At the 2002 convention of the U.S. Conference of Catholic Bishops (USCCB), DiLorenzo spoke in favor of tighter restrictions on priests accused of sexual abuse of minors. The new policy, adopted by the USCCB, prohibited accused priests from interacting with parishioners, but allowed them to remain in the priesthood.

On January 29, 2003, DiLorenzo removed Reverend Roberto Batoon as pastoral administrator of Molokai Catholic Community, a cluster of parishes on the Island of Molokai in Hawaii. Batoon had been accused of sexual abuse by several individuals when he was a priest in the Philippines. DiLorenzo is often credited with creating the first zero tolerance policy on allegations of sexual abuse at the hands of priests—a policy that predated the national Catholic sex abuse scandals in the early 2000s.

DiLorenzo hired Jerry Rauckhorst to run Catholic Charities Hawaii, which he did for the next 21 years.

=== Bishop of Richmond ===
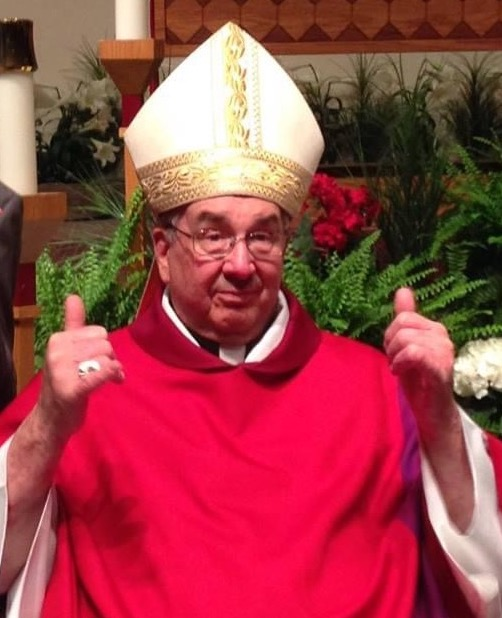
Bishop DiLorenzo at the Church of the Epiphany, Chesterfield County, Virginia (2014)

On March 31, 2004, John Paul II appointed DiLorenzo as bishop of Richmond. He was installed there on May 24, 2004.

==== Personnel changes ====
Upon his installation, DiLorenzo reactivated the diocese's liturgical commission. He named Reverend Russell Smith, the parochial vicar at St. Elizabeth Ann Seton Parish in New Kent County, as the diocesan theologian. This post had been vacant since 1998. As theologian, Smith examined all draft documents for conformance to Catholic teaching and issue approvals authorizing the publication of all printed materials. DiLorenzo noted that these kinds of checks and controls were needed because, he alleged, some people in the diocese were used to living outside the traditional boundaries of Catholicism.

DiLorenzo forcibly retired Reverend Thomas J. Quinlan, pastor of Holy Family Parish in Virginia Beach, Virginia, for a history of using offensive language during mass. It culminated with what DiLorenzo termed a sacrilegious reference to Mary, mother of Jesus, at a Christmas Eve mass. Although many parishioners appealed this decision, others applauded it, wondering why DiLorenzo had not acted sooner.

==== Diocesan administration ====
DiLorenzo moved his residence from Cathedral Place in Richmond to Midlothian, Virginia. Some Catholics raised questions about the move and see it as a way to distance himself from his flock. But DiLorenzo responded that he was only a 25 minute drive from the diocesan offices and that the move saved the diocese money: "Do I need to live in a three-story building by myself? I don't think so." The three-story house was converted into offices for those working in a building that the diocese was renting for $35,000 a year. "We saved ourselves thirty-some thousand a year," said DiLorenzo, "and I moved to Midlothian, a very quiet place."

DiLorenzo ended the diocesan sexual minorities commission, established by his predecessor in 1977. He explained his decision:

"What was being done was not a ministry. It was trying to make a statement... for people who see themselves discriminated against. The statement that needed to be made has been made. We are not going to make a big deal about what your fantasy sexual life is".

He added that there are moral expectations for everyone:

"I think most people would agree that the ministry is to call all persons to Jesus Christ in discipleship. The gender issue was not raised by Jesus.... Jesus called everyone to holiness. Are there certain groups in our population that need help in that journey?"

DiLorenzo increased the number of clustered parishes. He also brought in consultants to review some diocesan departments and commissions. He also planned to sell St. Mary Church in Chesapeake, Virginia, but did not proceed due to public relation concerns.

==== San Lorenzo Spiritual Center controversy ====
In 2004, DiLorenzo was drawn into a controversy at the San Lorenzo Spiritual Center in Virginia Beach. The center was a spiritual and cultural organization for 23,000 Filipinos living in Hampton Roads, Virginia area. In April 2004, a group of current and former members sent a petition to DiLorenzo complaining about Reverend Pantaleon Manalo, the center administrator. They accused Manalo of committing financial improprieties, accumulating unexplained personal wealth, missing annual financial reports, abusing his power and making inappropriate sexual statements.

In response, the vicar forane for the diocese, Monsignor Thomas J. Caroluzza, asked for Manalo's resignation in December 2004. Later that month, DiLorenzo terminated Manalo,, but then temporarily stayed that decision. After further investigation, DiLorenzo announced that Manalo had done nothing wrong, since the diocese had investigated the center and not Manalo. However, DiLorenzo ordered him to resign from his leadership post. DiLorenzo appointed Reverend Salvador Anonuevo, pastor of Saint Luke Parish in Virginia Beach, as the new center administrator. Manalo was allowed to continue there as a spiritual director

Manalo then sued the petitioner group, seeking $1.35 million for defamation. In August 2005, Judge Padrick of the Circuit Court of Virginia dismissed the defamation lawsuit, terming it an "intrusion into church affairs and violated the religious protections of the U.S. Constitution and the Virginia Constitution".

In January 2007, DiLorenzo removed Reverend Rodney L. Rodis from public ministry. The pastor of Immaculate Conception Parish in Buckner, Virginia, and St. Jude Parish in Mineral, Virginia, Rodis had been arrested for the theft of over $600,000 from the two parishes. During its investigation, the diocese also discovered that Rodis had a wife and three children living in a nearby county.

=== Retirement ===
In early 2017, DiLorenzo sent a letter of resignation as bishop of Richmond to Pope Francis in early 2017. Francis DiLorenzo died from heart and kidney failure on August 17, 2017, at St. Mary's Hospital in Richmond at age 75.

== See also ==
- Catholic Church hierarchy
- Catholic Church in the United States
- Historical list of the Catholic bishops of the United States
- List of Catholic bishops of the United States
- Lists of patriarchs, archbishops, and bishops
- Sexual abuse scandal in Honolulu diocese

== Episcopal succession ==
Catholic Church titles
Preceded by Walter Francis Sullivan	Bishop of Richmond; 2004– 2017	Succeeded by Barry C. Knestout (designate)
Preceded by Joseph Anthony Ferrario	Bishop of Honolulu; 1994–2004	Succeeded by Clarence Richard Silva
Preceded by –	Auxiliary Bishop of Scranton; 1988–1994	Succeeded by –
