= William Thomas Russell =

American prelate

His Excellency, The Right Reverend William Thomas Russell
- Bishop of Charleston
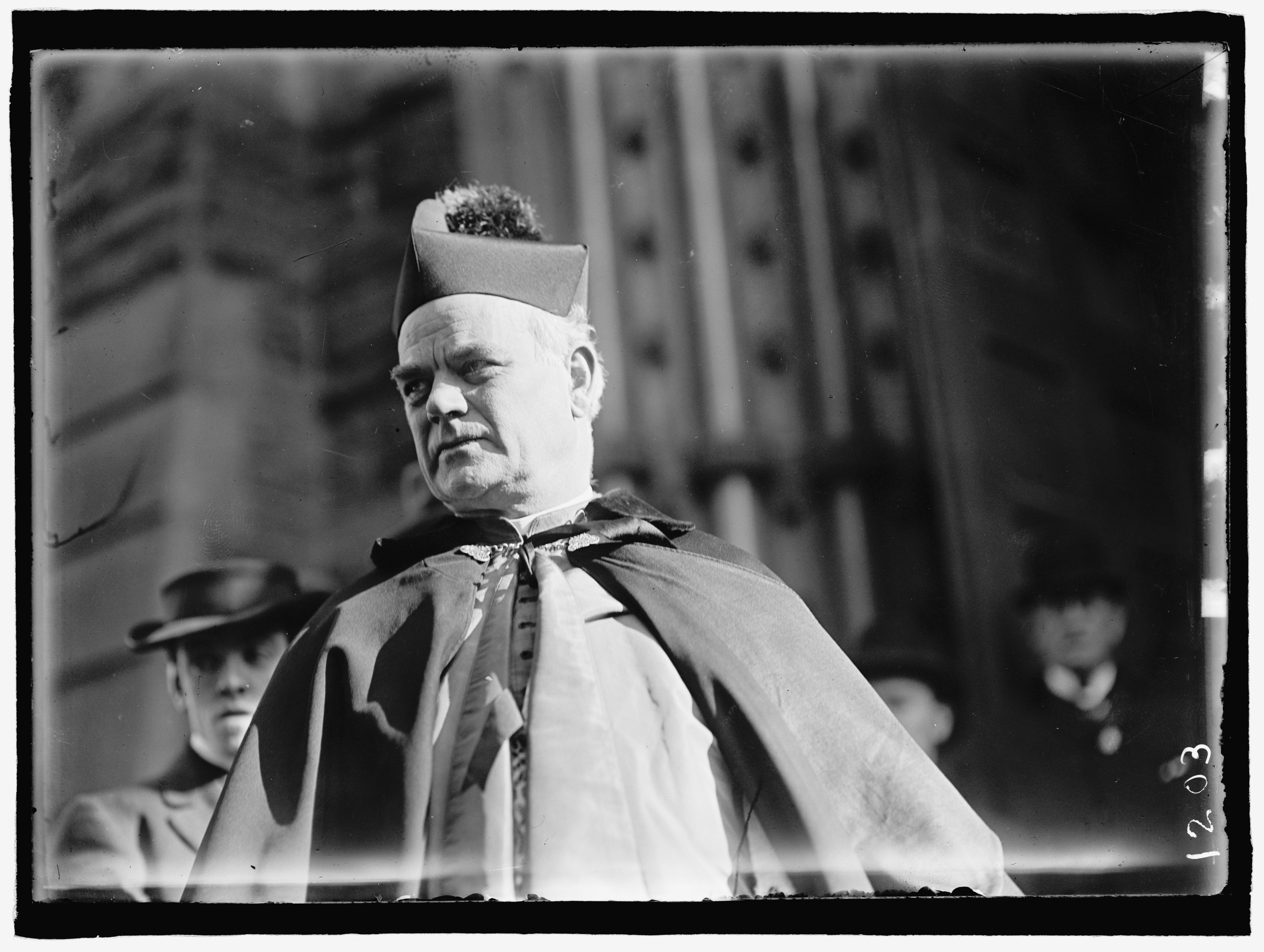
- See: Diocese of Charleston
- In office: March 15, 1917 to March 18, 1927
- Predecessor: Henry P. Northrop
- Successor: Emmet M. Walsh

Orders
- Ordination: June 21, 1889 by James Gibbons
- Consecration: March 15, 1917 by James Gibbons

Personal details
- Born: October 20, 1863 Baltimore, Maryland
- Died: March 18, 1927 (aged 63) Charleston, South Carolina, US
- Denomination: Roman Catholic
- Education: Loyola College; St. Charles College; Pontifical North American College; Catholic University of America
- Motto: Alias oves habeo (I have other sheep)

William Thomas Russell (October 20, 1863 – March 18, 1927) was an American prelate of the Roman Catholic Church. He served as bishop of the Diocese of Charleston in South Carolina from 1917 until his death in 1927.

== Biography ==
=== Early life and education ===
William Russell was born on October 20, 1863, in Baltimore, Maryland, to William and Rose Russell. He received his early education at the parochial school of St. Patrick's Parish in Baltimore. At age 14, he entered St. Charles College in Ellicott City, Maryland. Five years later, due to poor health, he returned to Baltimore to convalesce while attending Loyola College. After he recovered, Russell re-entered St. Charles, remaining there for four more years. He was then sent to Rome to study at the Pontifical North American College. However, bad health forced Russell again to return to Baltimore, where he continued his theological studies at St. Mary's Seminary.

=== Priesthood ===
On June 21, 1889, Russell was ordained to the priesthood in Baltimore for the Archdiocese of Baltimore by Cardinal James Gibbons. After his ordination, Russell was assigned as pastor of St. James Parish in Hyattsville, Maryland. In addition to his pastoral duties, he studied at the Catholic University of America in Washington, D.C., earning a Licentiate of Sacred Theology. He remained at St. James until 1894, when he became private secretary to Cardinal Gibbons and curate at the Cathedral of the Assumption in Baltimore

In 1908, Russell was named pastor of St. Patrick's Parish in Washington, D.C. He there earned a reputation as an eminent preacher. In 1909, he inaugurated the Pan-American Mass, an annual liturgical celebration held at St. Patrick's on Thanksgiving. Before being discontinued in 1914, the mass was attended by President William Howard Taft and representatives of 21 nations in the Americas. Russell was raised to the rank of domestic prelate by Pope Pius X in 1911, and named an honorary member of the Veterans of the Spanish War for his service as chaplain at Camp Chickamauga during the Spanish-American War. He published Maryland, the Land of Sanctuary in 1907, and authored the article on the Archdiocese of Baltimore in the Catholic Encyclopedia.

=== Bishop of Charleston ===
On December 7, 1916, Russell was appointed the fifth bishop of Charleston by Pope Benedict XV. He received his episcopal consecration on March 15, 1917, from Cardinal James Gibbons at Cathedral of the Assumption. Bishops John Monaghan and Owen Corrigan served as co-consecrators. He selected as his episcopal motto: Alias Oves Habeo (Latin: "I Have Other Sheep").

In addition to his episcopal duties, Russell served on the executive committee of the National Catholic War Council, and was head of the press department of the National Catholic Welfare Council. His relative, John Russell, later served as bishop of Charleston.

=== Death ===
William Russell died on March 18, 1927, in Charleston at age 63.

== See also ==
Catholic Church titles
Preceded by Henry P. Northrop	Bishop of Charleston; 1917–1927	Succeeded by Emmet M. Walsh
