= Francis J. Parater =

American Catholic seminarian, canonization candidate (1897–1920)

Servant of God Frank Parater
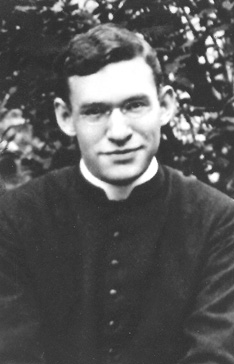

Personal details
- Born: Francis Joseph Parater Jr. October 10, 1897 Richmond, Virginia, U.S.
- Died: February 7, 1920 (aged 22) Rome, Italy
- Buried: Campo Verano, Rome
- Occupation: Seminarian

Francis Joseph Parater Jr. (October 10, 1897 – February 7, 1920) was an American Catholic seminarian from the Diocese of Richmond in Virginia who died of rheumatic fever at the age of 22 during his theological studies in Rome. His cause for canonization, the process by which one is declared a saint, was opened in 2001. He was declared a Servant of God in 2002 by Bishop Walter F. Sullivan.

== Life ==
Frank Parater was born on October 10, 1897, to a Catholic family in Richmond, Virginia, the son of Captain Francis J. Parater Sr. and his second wife, Mary Richmond. While growing up, he served as an altar boy, and attended the Xaverian Brothers' School (subsequently called Saint Patrick's School) and Benedictine High School (subsequently called Benedictine College Preparatory) in Richmond. In 1917, he graduated as the valedictorian of his class. Parater was active in scouting, and achieved the rank of Eagle Scout.

Parater decided to pursue a vocation to the priesthood after high school and began college at Belmont Abbey Seminary in 1917. As a seminarian, he was noted for his dedication to prayer and his intellectual and physical abilities. In 1919, his bishop, Denis J. O'Connell, sent him to study theology at the Pontifical North American College in Rome. He officially began his studies there on November 25, 1919.

In January 1920, Parater became very ill with rheumatic fever. He received last rites and died on February 7. After his death, his "Act of Oblation," a sort of prayer and spiritual testament he had written, was discovered. Both Pope Benedict XV and Pope Pius XI asked for copies of the document, and it has been published in English and in the L'Osservatore Romano in Italian. His body is interred in the mausoleum of the Pontifical North American College in Rome's Campo Verano cemetery.

== Cause for canonization ==
The nihil obstat of the Holy See to begin the cause for Frank Parater's canonization was granted on May 8, 2001. The bishop of Richmond at the time, Walter F. Sullivan, established the tribunal on March 24, 2002. The postulator of the cause is Rev. J. Scott Duarte, J.C.D.

== See also ==
- List of American candidates for sainthood
