= Vincent Stanislaus Waters =

American prelate

His Excellency, The Most Reverend Vincent Stanislaus Waters
- Bishop of Raleigh
- See: Diocese of Raleigh
- Installed: March 15, 1945
- Term ended: December 3, 1974
- Predecessor: Eugene J. McGuinness
- Successor: Francis Joseph Gossman
- Other post: Chancellor of the Diocese of Richmond

Orders
- Ordination: December 8, 1931 by Francesco Marchetti Selvaggiani
- Consecration: May 15, 1945 by Peter Leo Ireton

Personal details
- Born: August 15, 1904 Roanoke, Virginia, US
- Died: December 3, 1974 (aged 70) Raleigh, North Carolina, US
- Denomination: Roman Catholic
- Education: Belmont Abbey College

Ordination history of Vincent Stanislaus Waters
History
Episcopal consecration
- Consecrated by: Peter Leo Ireton (Bishop of Richmond)
Episcopal succession
Bishops consecrated by Vincent Stanislaus Waters as principal consecrator
- Charles Borromeo McLaughlin: April 15, 1964
- George Edward Lynch: January 6, 1970

Vincent Stanislaus Waters (August 15, 1904 – December 3, 1974) was an American Catholic prelate who served as Bishop of Raleigh from 1945 until his death in 1974. He is best known for desegregating his diocese early on in the civil rights movement.

== Biography ==
=== Early life and education ===
Vincent Waters was born on August 15, 1904, in Roanoke, Virginia, to Michael Bernard and Mary Frances (née Crowley) Waters. He attended Belmont Abbey College in Belmont, North Carolina from 1920 to 1925, and then entered St. Charles College in Ellicott City, Maryland (1925-1926) and St. Mary's Seminary in Baltimore, Maryland (1926-1928). Waters furthered his studies at the Pontifical North American College in Rome.

=== Ordination and ministry ===
Waters was ordained to the priesthood for the Diocese of Richmond in Rome by Cardinal Francesco Selvaggiani on December 8, 1931. Following his return to Virginia in 1932, Waters served as a curate at Holy Cross Parish in Lynchburg, Virginia, until 1936, when he was transferred to Sacred Heart Cathedral in Richmond, Virginia. Waters served as chancellor of the diocese from 1936 to 1943, and director of the diocesan Mission Fathers from 1943 to 1945.

=== Bishop of Raleigh ===
On March 15, 1945, Waters was appointed the third bishop of the Diocese of Raleigh by Pope Pius XII. He received his episcopal consecration on May 15, 1945, from Bishop Peter Ireton, with Bishops Gerald O'Hara and Emmet M. Walsh serving as co-consecrators.

In 1953, a year before Brown v. Board of Education decision by the US Supreme Court, Waters ordered the desegregation of all Catholic churches and schools in the diocese. He described racial segregation as a product of "darkness," and declared that "the time has come for it to end." He also said,

"I am not unmindful, as a Southerner, of the force of this virus of prejudice among some persons in the South, as well as in the North. I know, however, that there is a cure for this virus, and that is our faith."

Bishop Michael Begley said of Waters,

"[his] missionary zeal and his concern for God's people cannot be measured. He was a leader in many fields, one of which was civil rights, as he fought for the civil rights of the black people in integrating schools, churches and all Catholic institutions."

Waters attended all four sessions of the Second Vatican Council in Rome between 1962 and 1965. Waters was later accused by some of the diocesan clergy of holding on to idle church property worth millions of dollars while some parishes were in debt. He also denied requests for the creation of a priests' senate, and had his resignation requested by around twenty percent of the clergy. In 1972, Waters expelled five Sisters of Providence nuns from the diocese for not wearing their religious habits while teaching.

Vincent Waters died from a heart attack at his residence in Raleigh on December 3, 1974, at age 70. He is buried in the cemetery of Our Lady of Guadalupe Catholic Church in Newton Grove, North Carolina.

== See also ==
- Catholic Church hierarchy
- Catholic Church in the United States
- Historical list of the Catholic bishops of the United States
- List of Catholic bishops of the United States
- Lists of patriarchs, archbishops, and bishops

== Episcopal succession ==
Catholic Church titles
Preceded by Eugene J. McGuinness	Bishop of Raleigh; 1945—1974	Succeeded by Francis Joseph Gossman
