= John Joyce Russell =

American prelate

His Excellency, The Most Reverend John Joyce Russell
- Bishop of Richmond
- Church: Roman Catholic Church
- See: Diocese of Richmond
- In office: July 3, 1958 – April 28, 1973
- Predecessor: Peter Leo Ireton
- Successor: Walter Francis Sullivan
- Previous posts: Bishop of Charleston; 1950 to 1958

Orders
- Ordination: July 8, 1923 by William Thomas Russell
- Consecration: March 14, 1950 by Amleto Cicognani

Personal details
- Born: December 1, 1897 Baltimore, Maryland, US
- Died: March 17, 1993 (aged 95) Richmond, Virginia, US
- Education: St. Charles College; St. Mary's Seminary; Pontifical Urban University
- Motto: Per matrem dei (Through the mother of God)

Ordination history of John Joyce Russell
History
Episcopal consecration
- Consecrated by: Amleto Giovanni Cicognani
Episcopal succession
Bishops consecrated by John Joyce Russell as principal consecrator
- James Louis Flaherty: October 15, 1966
- Walter Francis Sullivan: December 1, 1970

John Joyce Russell (December 1, 1897 – March 17, 1993) was an American prelate of the Roman Catholic Church, serving as bishop of the Diocese of Richmond in Virginia from 1958 to 1973. He previously served as bishop of the Diocese of Charleston in South Carolina from 1950 to 1958.

== Biography ==
=== Early life ===
John Russell was born on December 1, 1897, in Baltimore, Maryland, to John and Mary (née Joyce) Russell. John Russell attended Calvert Hall College High School and Loyola High School, both in Towson, Maryland.

From 1912 to 1917, he studied at St. Charles College in Ellicott City, Maryland. Russell earned his Master of Arts degree from St. Mary's Seminary in Baltimore in 1919, and a Doctor of Sacred Theology degree from the Pontifical Urbaniana University in Rome in 1923. Russell was a schoolmate of the seminarian Francis J. Parater, now a servant of god.

=== Priesthood ===
John Russell was ordained to the priesthood in Rome by Bishop William Russell, his relative, for the Archdiocese of Baltimore on July 8, 1923. Following his return to Baltimore, John Russell served as a curate at St. Martin Parish in Baltimore from 1923 to 1937. He also served as diocesan director of Catholic Big Brothers and of the Holy Name Societies from 1927 to 1946. From 1929 to 1946, he was diocesan director of the Catholic Evidence Guild.

Russell served as pastor of St. Ursula Parish in Baltimore from 1937 to 1946, and was named a domestic prelate by the Vatican in 1945. Russell then served as pastor of St. Patrick Parish in Washington, D.C. from 1946 to 1948 and as diocesan director of Catholic Charities (1946–1950). From 1948 to 1950, he was pastor of the Church of the Nativity.

=== Bishop of Charleston ===
On January 28, 1950, Russell was appointed bishop of Charleston by Pope Pius XII. He received his episcopal consecration at St. Matthew's Cathedral in Washington D.C. on March 14, 1950, from Archbishop Amleto Cicognani, with Archbishop Patrick O'Boyle and Bishop John Michael McNamara serving as co-consecrators.

=== Bishop of Richmond ===
Russell was named the tenth bishop of Richmond by Pius XII on July 3, 1958; he was installed on September 30, 1958. From 1962 to 1965, Russell attended the Second Vatican Council in Rome. In implementing the Council's reforms, Russell established a diocesan Commission on Ecumenical Affairs in 1963, and a diocesan pastoral council and a council of priests in 1966. A champion of civil rights for African-Americans, he required an interview with the parents of prospective students for Richmond's Catholic schools, looking for signs of racism.

=== Death and legacy ===
Russell's resignation as bishop of Richmond was accepted by Pope Paul VI on April 28, 1973. John Russell died on March 17, 1993, at St. Joseph's Home in Richmond at age 95.

Catholic Church titles
Preceded by Emmet M. Walsh	Bishop of Charleston; 1950–1958	Succeeded by Paul John Hallinan
Preceded by Peter Leo Ireton	Bishop of Richmond; 1958–1973	Succeeded by Walter Francis Sullivan
