= Thomas J. Quinlan =

American Catholic priest (1929–2012)

Thomas J. Quinlan (April 23, 1929 – April 24, 2012) was an American Catholic priest of the Diocese of Richmond.

== Career ==
Father Quinlan (TQ) was ordained priest on May 1, 1958, and was named a curate at Blessed Sacrament Parish in Alexandria, Virginia. He subsequently served at:

• Blessed Sacrament Catholic Church in Alexandria (05/22/58 - 01/26/63) - Associate Pastor

• Assumption Parish in Keyser, West Virginia (01/27/63 - 08/15/63) - Associate Pastor

• Sacred Heart Catholic Church in Norfolk, Virginia (08/16/63 - 05/31/68) - Associate Pastor

• Sacred Heart Catholic Church in Covington, Virginia (01/01/68 - 12/06/68) - Pastor

• St. Vincent De Paul Catholic Church in Newport News (12/07/68 - 07/26/71) - Pastor

• Good Shepherd Catholic Church in Mount Vernon, Virginia Alexandria (07/27/71 - 09/03/74) - Pastor

• Basilica of Saint Mary of the Immaculate Conception in Norfolk (10/01/74 - 06/01/85) - Pastor

• Sabbatical and Runaway from the Bishop (06/01/85 - 05/25/86)

• St. Kateri Tekakwitha Catholic Church in Tabb (05/26/86 - 06/11/00) - Founding Pastor

• Church of the Holy Family in Virginia Beach (06/12/00 - 06/13/05) - Pastor

TQ was instrumental in providing a Haitian village with a freshwater well and a school by partnering their parish with Holy family.

Father Quinlan was also the president of the priest senate in the Richmond diocese.

Throughout his entire career as a Catholic Priest, T.Q. has emphasized the importance of caring for the poor, the marginalized, and the disenfranchised. At his prior assignment, St. Kateri Tekakwitha, he founded a thrift shop in Poquoson, VA to specifically help the poor.

Father Quinlan was known for his "wake up" approach to teaching the Gospel and the message of Jesus Christ. His homilies tended to spark lively discussion within the communities he served. His style and approach to getting people involved in the Church and in the community, occasionally generated interest in the media.

The Bishop of Richmond, Francis X. DiLorenzo, retired Father Quinlan in June, 2005, from service at Holy Family in Virginia Beach. A Christmas Eve homily, which made references to Mary's humanly giving birth to Jesus, offended some members of the parish and was reported to Bishop DiLorenzo.

According to local newspapers, Father Quinlan drove a Volkswagen down the aisle during a Palm Sunday procession at Good Shepherd Catholic Church. At another Palm Sunday Mass, "T.Q." drove a three-ton forklift down the center aisle at The Basilica of St. Mary of the Immaculate Conception in Norfolk VA. Jet Magazine, August 18, 1977 The "yellow brick road" imagery was a metaphor for Jesus' pilgrimage to Jerusalem. Father Quinlan occasionally costumed himself as The Grinch or as Superman at the beginning of a Mass. Another endeavor included a psychedelic Mass with lighting effects.

On 30 January 2006, The Catholic Virginian (the official newspaper of the Roman Catholic Diocese of Richmond), printed the following regarding Fr. Quinlan:

"The Rev. Thomas Quinlan, a retired priest of the Diocese of Richmond, can no longer celebrate the sacraments publicly. He can celebrate Mass privately. Bishop DiLorenzo said he took this action as a response to Father Quinlan's behavior that has 'engendered anxiety and emotional upset which interferes with an individual's religious experience.'"
