= Diocese of Richmond =

Latin Catholic jurisdiction in the United States

Coordinates: 37°32′50.8″N 77°27′07.7″W

Diocese of Richmond Diœcesis Richmondiensis

Catholic
- Cathedral of the Sacred Heart

- Coat of arms

Location
- Country: United States
- Territory: Central and Southern Virginia, as well as the Eastern Shore of Virginia
- Ecclesiastical province: Baltimore
- Metropolitan: Baltimore

Statistics
- Area: 36,711 sq mi (95,080 km^{2})
- Population: Total; Catholics: (as of 2015); 4,942,100; 236,061 (4.7%)
- Parishes: 142
- Schools: 28

Information
- Denomination: Catholic
- Sui iuris church: Latin Church
- Rite: Roman Rite
- Established: July 11, 1820; 206 years ago
- Cathedral: Cathedral of the Sacred Heart
- Patron saint: Vincent de Paul

Current leadership
- Pope: Leo XIV
- Bishop: Barry C. Knestout
- Metropolitan Archbishop: William E. Lori

Map
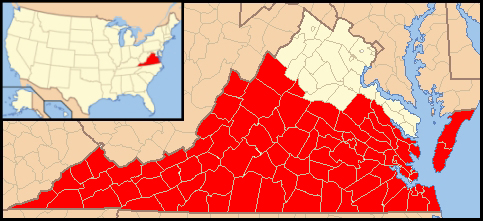

Website
- www.richmonddiocese.org

The Diocese of Richmond (Latin: Diœcesis Richmondiensis) is a Latin Church diocese of the Catholic Church in Virginia in the United States. It is a suffragan diocese of the metropolitan Archdiocese of Baltimore.

The diocese's current bishop is Barry C. Knestout, who was appointed by Pope Francis on December 5, 2017.

== Statistics ==
The Diocese of Richmond encompasses all of central and southern Virginia, the Hampton Roads area, and the Eastern Shore of Chesapeake Bay.

As of 2022, the diocese had 135 diocesan and religious priests serving a Catholic population of 226,674 in 138 parishes and eight missions. The diocese was operating nine hospitals and seven facilities for the elderly.

== History ==
=== 1600 to 1800 ===
Prior to the American Revolution, few Catholics lived in the British Colony of Virginia. Attempts to found Catholic settlements in Virginia were made by Lord Baltimore in 1629, and by Captain George Brent in 1687. In 1634, John Altham, a Jesuit companion of Andrew White, performed missionary work among the Native American tribes living on the south bank of the Potomac River.

The colonial government of Virginia soon enacted stringent laws against the practice of Catholicism. In 1687, Catholic priests Edmonds and Raymond were arrested at Norfolk, Virginia, for exercising their priestly functions. During the last quarter of the 18th century, the few Catholic settlers at Aquia Creek near the Potomac, were attended by John Carroll and other Jesuit missionaries from Maryland.

=== 1800 to 1820 ===
With the 1786 passage of the Virginia Statute for Religious Freedom, proposed by future US President Thomas Jefferson, Catholics were granted religious freedom in the new State of Virginia. Jean Dubois, accompanied by several French priests and letters of introduction from the Marquis de Lafayette, arrived in Norfolk in August 1791. in December 1791, the Virginia General Assembly invited Dubois to celebrate a Mass in the courtroom of the new Virginia State House. It was the first Mass conducted anywhere in Richmond.

Future US President James Monroe hosted Dubois in Richmond until he was able to rent a house there. Dubois later opened a school to teach French, the classics and arithmetic. Virginia Governor Patrick Henry helped Dubois learn English. For two years, Dubois mainly celebrated Mass in rented rooms or at the homes of Richmond's few Catholic families.

According to tradition, Alexandria had a log chapel with an unknown resident Catholic priest by 1776. John Thayer from Boston was stationed at the chapel in 1794. Francis Neale erected a brick church in Alexandria in 1796 and constructed a larger one there in 1811. The Jesuit Anthony Kohlmann and future Bishop Benedict Fenwick frequently officiated in Alexandria.

The first Catholic church in Norfolk was St. Patrick's in 1791. Its parishioners were refugees who had fled France after the French Revolution in 1789. It is the oldest parish in the diocese. Around 1796, the priest James Bushe started building new church in Norfolk. He was succeeded there by the future Archbishop Leonard Neale.

=== 1820 to 1850 ===
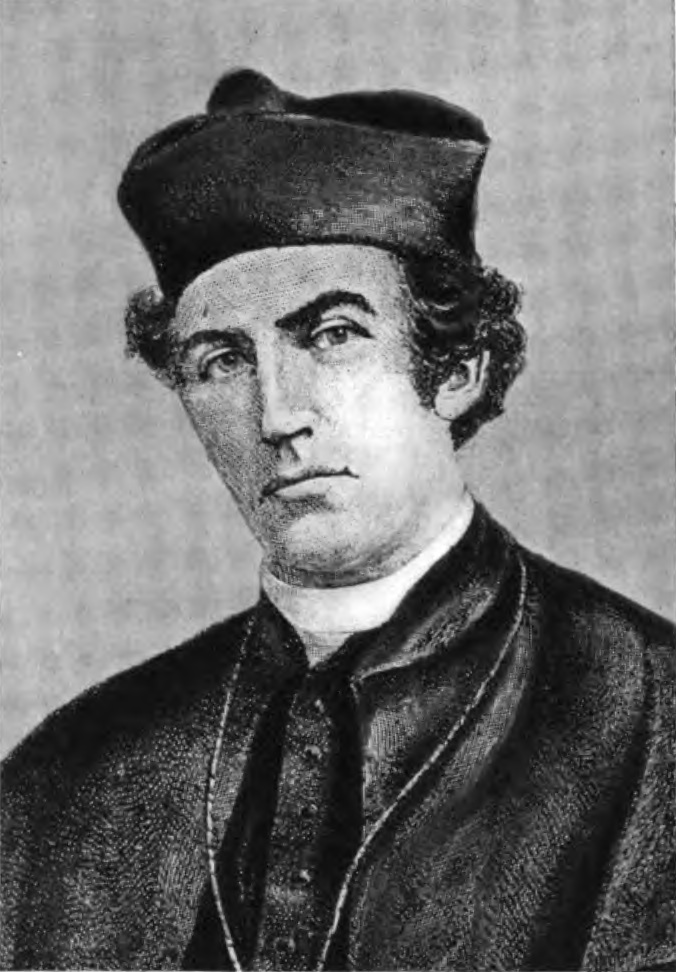
Bishop Kelly (pre-1914)

Pope Pius VII erected the Diocese of Richmond on July 11, 1820. He removed all of Virginia (except for the two counties of the Eastern Shore region) and present-day West Virginia from the Archdiocese of Baltimore. Pius VII appointed Patrick Kelly as its first bishop.After arriving in New York City in 1820, Kelly traveled to Baltimore to meet Bishop Ambrose Maréchal. Kelly wrote to his brother about Maréchal:

He did not receive me over kindly, and tried to persuade me it would be dangerous to take possession of my See; but his arguments did not satisfy me, and I arrived Norfolk on 19th January.

In January 1821, Kelly took up residence in Norfolk which had a larger Catholic population than the episcopal see in Richmond. While bishop, Kelly opened the first Catholic school in the diocese and engaged in missionary efforts. Kelly was soon involved in disputes with Maréchal over their jurisdictions. To end the fighting, Pius VII appointed Kelly as bishop of the Diocese of Waterford and Lismore in Ireland in early 1822. There would be no new bishop in Richmond for the next 18 years.

Pope Gregory XVI named Richard Whelan of Richmond as the new bishop of that diocese in 1840. Since Kelly's departure in 1822, the diocese had been vacant. During that period, Richmond had become a stronghold of the Know-Nothing political party, known for its anti-Catholic bigotry and violence. As the diocese only had six priests, Whelan appealed to the Societies for the Propagation of the Faith in Paris, Lyon, France, and Vienna in the Austrian Empire to recruit priests. He also established a seminary college outside Richmond, where he resided and taught classes whenever he was in town. Whelan also established several parishes, missions and schools.

In 1848, Whelan petitioned Pope Pius IX to divide the Diocese of Richmond into two dioceses, with the Allegheny Mountains serving as the boundary. In 1850, Pope Pius IX erected the Diocese of Wheeling. He removed from the Diocese of Richmond all of Virginia west of the Allegheny Mountain. Pius IX named Whelan bishop of the new diocese and replaced him in Richmond with John McGill of the Diocese of Bardstown.

=== 1850 to 1870 ===
Bishop McGill (pre-1914)

When McGill arrived in Richmond in 1850, the diocese had 7,000 Catholics, eight priests, and 10 churches. He convened the first diocesan synod in 1855. During his tenure, Virginia was devastated by yellow fever and cholera epidemics. Pius IX in 1858, transferred the territory of Alexandria to the Diocese of Richmond. The Federal government in 1846 had retroceded the city of Alexandria back to Virginia from the District of Columbia.

During the American Civil War of the early 1860s, Catholics in the Confederate States were unable to purchase Catholic books published in the North. To fill the gap, McGill wrote, "The True Church Indicated to the Inquirer" and "Our Faith, the Victory", republished as "The Creed of Catholics". He also visited Union Army prisoners of war in the Libby Prison in Richmond, doing what he could to aid them. In 1867, McGill brought the Sisters of Charity from Emmitburgh, Maryland, to set up a school in the diocese. McGill died in 1872 and Pius IX named James Gibbons, then vicar apostolic of North Carolina, as the new bishop of Richmond. Gibbons stayed in Richmond for five years, at which point Pius IX appointed him coadjutor archbishop of Baltimore.

The start of the American Civil War in 1865 had led to the formation of the state of West Virginia. It consisted of the western counties of Virginia, which had seceded from Virginia rather than be part of the breakaway Confederate States. However, the new state boundary between Virginia and West Virginia did not coincide with the boundary between the Dioceses of Wheeling and Richmond. This disparity endured for over a century. Pope Pius IX erected the new Diocese of Wilmington in 1868. As part of that new diocese, the pope removed two Eastern Shore counties from the Diocese of Richmond.

=== 1870 to 1910 ===
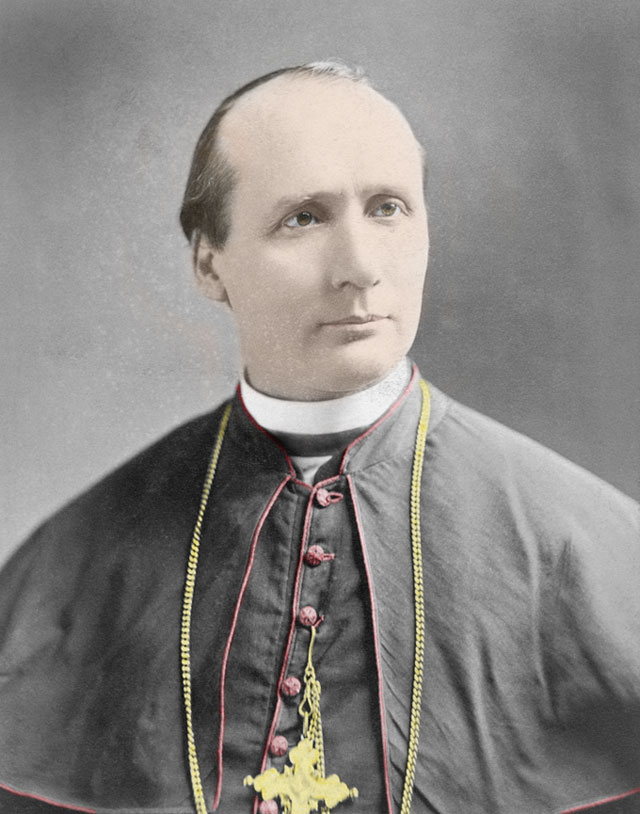
Bishop Keane

After McGill died in 1872, Pope Leo XIII appointed John J. Keane of the Archdiocese of Baltimore as the new bishop of Richmond. As bishop, Keane established the Confraternity of the Holy Ghost, a Catholic fellowship, in the diocese. He published A Sodality Manual for the Use of the Servants of the Holy Ghost in 1880. Despite opposition, Keane founded schools and churches for Catholic African-Americans in the diocese. He addressed Protestant groups to educate them about the Catholic Church. Keene was appointed rector of the Catholic University of America in Washington D.C. in 1886. He resigned his post as bishop two years later to serve full time as rector.

In 1889, Leo XIII appointed Augustine Van de Vyver as bishop of the Diocese of Richmond. In 1901, philanthropist Thomas Ryan and his wife donated almost $500,000 to buy the land and construct a new Sacred Heart Cathedral in Richmond. It was consecrated in 1906. While bishop, Van de Vyver open new religious congregations, schools and other Catholic institutions. With assistance from a donor, Van de Vyver opened an industrial college for African-American boys in Rock Castle, Virginia. Katherine Drexel, mother superior of the Sisters of the Blessed Sacrament. opened a school for African-American girls.

In August 1902, Joseph Anciaux a Belgian Josephite priest in Virginia wrote a letter to the Congregation of the Propaganda in Rome, condemning acceptance by the U.S. Catholic hierarchy of racial segregation in the United States. He called it a radical and non-Catholic policy, and accused Van de Vyver personally of timidity in the face of "negro haters". In October 1902, Van de Vyver forced Anciaux to leave the diocese.

=== 1910 to 1970 ===
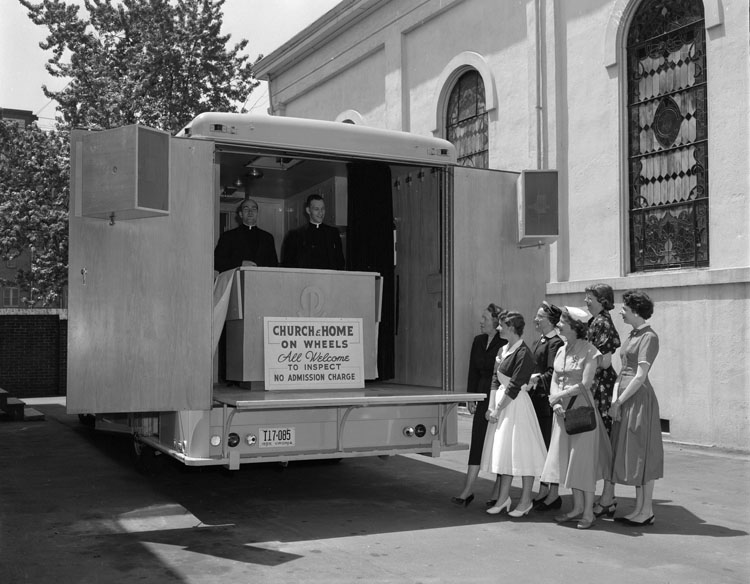
Catholic "church on wheels" in Richmond (1955)

After Van de Vyver died in 1911, Pope Pius X named Auxiliary Bishop Denis J. O'Connell of the Archdiocese of San Francisco as the new bishop of Richmond. The first parish in Virginia Beach, the Star of the Sea, was established in 1915.

O'Connell resigned due to bad health in 1926 and Pope Pius XI named Auxiliary Bishop Andrew Brennan of the Diocese of Scranton to replace him. In 1929, at Brennan's suggestion, the Holy Name Society of Richmond establish the Catholic Laymen's League of Virginia. It was created to counteract the flow of anti-Catholic bigotry and misinformation in the media and from some Protestant ministers.

In 1935, Pius XI named Peter Ireton of Baltimore to assist Brennan as coadjutor bishop of the Diocese of Richmond, a job Ireton would hold for ten years. When Brennan resigned in 1945, Ireton automatically succeeded him as bishop of Richmond. During his tenure as bishop, Ireton established 42 parishes, built 24 schools, and increased the Catholic population from 37,000 to 147,000.

Ireton died in 1958 and Pius XI appointed Bishop John Russell from the Diocese of Charleston as his replacement. In implementing the Second Vatican Council reforms, Russell established a diocesan Commission on Ecumenical Affairs in 1963, and a diocesan Pastoral Council and a Council of Priests in 1966. A champion of civil rights, he had the parents of prospective students for Richmond's Catholic schools be interviewed for signs of racism.

=== 1970 to 2000 ===
In 1970, Pope Paul VI named Walter Sullivan as auxiliary bishop in Richmond. When Russell resigned as bishop of Richmond in 1973, the pope appointed Sullivan as the new bishop. In 1974, Paul VI established the current boundaries of the Diocese of Richmond by:

- Transferring the two Eastern Shore counties, ceded to the Diocese of Wilmington in 1868, back to the Diocese of Richmond
- Erecting the new Diocese of Arlington, taking Northern Virginia from the Diocese of Richmond
- Realigning the boundary between the Dioceses of Richmond and Wheeling to match the Virginia-West Virginia state line

In 1977, Sullivan established a joint Catholic and Episcopalian parish, Holy Apostles in Virginia Beach. The church had separate altars for the two denominations. That same year, he established the diocesan Commission on Sexual Minorities to reach out to LGBTQ+ Catholics.

In March 1994, after the suicide of a 21-year-old man, his parents requested that the diocese not allow the priest John Hesch to participate in his funeral Mass, prompting a diocesan investigation of Hesch. It revealed allegations by the deceased that Hesch had molested him during the 1980s when he was a student at St. Benedict School. In June 1994, Bishop Sullivan confronted Hesch with the accusations. Later that day, Hesch committed suicide. In July 1994, former St. Benedict teacher Jacqueline M. Mishkel said she and another teacher reported Hesch to the diocese in 1985, alleging that students told her Hesch had them feel his exposed penis during sex education classes. She said the diocese told her Hesch would be sent away for counseling, but nothing happened.

In April and August 1996, according to the 2023 Attorney General's Report on Child Sexual Abuse in the Archdiocese of Baltimore, two men reported to the diocese that they had been molested as teenagers by priest John Bostwick III between 1980 and 1982, alleging Bostwick fondled one's genitals and tried the same with the other. Sullivan in November 1996 suspended Bostwick, then serving in Louisiana, and ordered him to attend a treatment facility, which Bostwick refused. Bostwick was never returned to ministry.

=== 2000 to 2010 ===
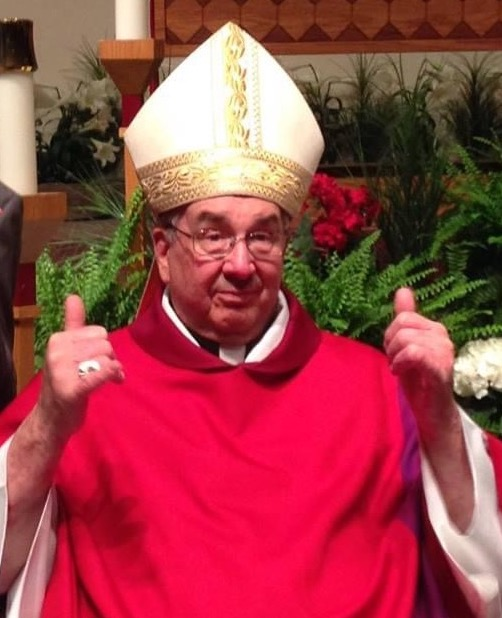
Bishop DiLorenzo (2014)

In July 2003, the diocese was sued for defamation for $14 million by Carole Kahwajy, a principal of St. Benedict School in Richmond who was fired by the diocese in January 2002. Kahwajy claimed that diocesan officials had spread a story that she had covered up the sexual abuse of boys at St. Benedict by priest John Hesch. She also claimed that diocese said she was sexually abusing boys at the school and had an intimate relationship with another priest. In 2003, after 33 years as bishop, Sullivan retired.

Pope John Paul II named Bishop Francis X. DiLorenzo of the Diocese of Honolulu as Sullivan's replacement in 2004. Upon his installation, DiLorenzo reactivated the diocese's liturgical commission to assert control over any statements or documents produced by clergy within the diocese. DiLorenzo in 2006 forcibly retired Thomas J. Quinlan, pastor of Holy Family Catholic Church in Virginia Beach for a history of using provocative language during Mass. The situation had culminated with what DiLorenzo termed a sacrilegious reference to Mary, mother of Jesus, by Quinlan at a Christmas Eve Mass.

DiLorenzo moved his residence from Cathedral Place in Richmond to Midlothian. Some Catholics raised questions about the move and see it as a way to distance himself from his flock. But DiLorenzo responded that he is only 25 minutes away from the diocesan offices and that the move saved the diocese money: "Do I need to live in a three-story building by myself? I don't think so." The three-story house was turned into offices for those working in a building that the diocese was renting for $35,000 a year. "We saved ourselves thirty-some thousand a year," said DiLorenzo, "and I moved to Midlothian, a very quiet place."

=== 2010 to present ===
In 2013, the diocese reported an increase in the number of seminarians preparing for the priesthood. According to Michael Boehling, the typical candidate was in his early to mid-20s, and was a college graduate with a degree in history, science or mathematics. "They are articulate and bright, well-rounded individuals who are mature for their age,"

A judge in 2016 dismissed a lawsuit filed by a former diocesan employee. The diocese had hired John Murphy to serve as executive director of the Saint Francis Home in Richmond. The diocese fired him a week later after learning that he was in a same-sex marriage. Murphy asked for a dismissal after reaching a financial settlement with the diocese.

DiLorenzo ended the diocesan sexual minorities commission, which his predecessor had established in 1977. DiLorenzo increased the number of clustered parishes. He also brought in consultants to review some diocesan departments and commissions for dissolution. DiLorenzo died in August 2017. His replacement as bishop was Auxiliary Bishop Barry C. Knestout from the Archdiocese of Washington, appointed by Pope Francis in 2017.

In January 2019, Knestout gave permission to the Episcopal Diocese of Southern Virginia to use Saint Bede Catholic Church in Williamsburg for the ordination of Susan B. Haynes as its new bishop. The Episcopal diocese did not have a cathedral and usually rotated locations for its ordinations and other events. The announcement of the ordination was met with opposition by some Catholics who objected to holding a non-Catholic worship service and the episcopal ordination of a woman in a Catholic church. Over 3,000 people signed an online petition condemning the action. Two days later, the Diocese of Southern Virginia announced it would celebrate Haynes' ordination elsewhere. In February 2019, Bishop Knestout released a list of 42 priests with "credible and substantiated" accusations of sexual abuse against them, covering allegations from the 1950s to 1993. The list included Bishop Carroll Dozier of the Diocese of Memphis, who was accused sex abuse while serving in the Diocese of Richmond. Four more names were added to the list in July 2021.

In 2019, Knestout instructed Mark White, a diocesan priest, to shut down his blog, under pain of removal from the priesthood. White had criticized the church hierarchy's handling of the child sexual abuse crisis. His targets included former Cardinal Theodore McCarrick, for whom Knestout had served as priest secretary, and Cardinal Donald Wuerl, with whom Knestout had worked as auxiliary bishop. In May 2020, Knestout removed White from his parish, trespassed him from the parish residence, and ordered him to take up residence at a retreat center and undertake a ministry to prisoners. In June 2020, the Vatican denied White's appeal of Knestout's decree. In October 2020, the Richmond newspapers revealed that the diocese had paid $6.3 million to settle 51 out of 68 claims of sexual abuse. In 2021, White said that Knestout was petitioning the Vatican to laicize him.

== Bishops ==
=== Bishops of Richmond ===
1. Patrick Kelly (1820–1822), appointed Bishop of Waterford and Lismore
2. Richard Vincent Whelan (1841–1850), appointed Bishop of Wheeling
3. John McGill (1850–1872)
4. James Gibbons (1872–1877), appointed Archbishop of Baltimore (elevated to Cardinal in 1886)
5. John Joseph Keane (1878–1888), appointed Rector of The Catholic University of America and Archbishop of Dubuque
6. Augustine Van de Vyver (1889–1911)
7. Denis Joseph O'Connell (1912–1926)
8. Andrew James Louis Brennan (1926–1945)
9. Peter Leo Ireton (1945–1958)
10. John Joyce Russell (1958–1973)
11. Walter Francis Sullivan (1974–2003)
12. Francis Xavier DiLorenzo (2004–2017)
13. Barry Christopher Knestout (2018–present)

=== Auxiliary Bishops of Richmond ===
- Joseph Howard Hodges (1952–1961), appointed Bishop of Wheeling
- Ernest Leo Unterkoefler (1962–1964), appointed Bishop of Charleston
- James Louis Flaherty (1966–1975)
- Walter Francis Sullivan (1970–1974), appointed Bishop of Richmond
- David Edward Foley (1986–1994), appointed Bishop of Birmingham

=== Other diocesan priests who became bishops ===
- Francis Janssens, appointed Bishop of Natchez in 1881 and later Archbishop of New Orleans
- Vincent Stanislaus Waters, appointed Bishop of Raleigh in 1945
- Carroll Thomas Dozier, appointed Bishop of Memphis in 1970
- Antons Justs, appointed Bishop of Jelgava, Latvia in 1995

== Notable people ==
- Francis J. Parater (1897–1920), seminarian and candidate for canonization

== Knights of Columbus ==
The Knights of Columbus has several councils in the Diocese of Richmond. One of its best known services is the KOVAR drive, which raises money for Virginians with intellectual disabilities.

== Education ==
As of 2022, the Diocese of Richmond had 29 schools serving approximately 9,200 students.

=== High schools ===
- Benedictine College Preparatory – Richmond
- Blessed Sacrament Huguenot Catholic School – Powhatan
- Cardinal Newman Academy – Bon Air
- Catholic High School – Virginia Beach
- Cristo Rey Richmond High School – Richmond
- Peninsula Catholic High School – Newport News
- Roanoke Catholic School – Roanoke
- Saint Gertrude High School – Goochland
- St. Vincent de Paul Virtual Academy – Newport News. It is administered by Peninsula Catholic High School.
- Walsingham Academy – Williamsburg

=== Closed schools ===
Holy Cross Regional Catholic School – Lynchburg

=== Lower Schools ===
The Diocese of Richmond oversees other Catholic education options across Virginia that are administered by different parishes, religious orders and private lay groups.

=== Higher Education ===
Bon Secours Memorial College of Nursing – Henrico

== See also ==
- Historical list of the Catholic bishops of the United States
- List of Catholic bishops in the United States
- List of Catholic dioceses in the United States
- List of Catholic archdioceses (by country and continent)
- List of Catholic dioceses (alphabetical) (including archdioceses)
- List of Catholic dioceses (structured view) (including archdioceses)
