= Peter Leo Ireton =

American prelate

His Excellency, The Most Reverend Peter Leo Ireton
- Bishop of Richmond; Titular Bishop of Cyme
- See: Diocese of Richmond
- In office: April 14, 1945 to April 26, 1958
- Predecessor: Andrew James Louis Brennan
- Successor: John Joyce Russell
- Previous post: Coadjutor Bishop of Richmond (1935 to 1945)

Orders
- Ordination: June 20, 1906 by James Gibbons
- Consecration: October 23, 1935 by Michael Joseph Curley

Personal details
- Born: September 21, 1882 Baltimore, Maryland, US
- Died: April 27, 1958 (aged 75) Washington, D.C., US
- Denomination: Roman Catholic
- Education: St. Charles College; St. Mary's Seminary
- Motto: In nomine Jesu (In the name of Jesus)

Peter Leo Ireton (September 21, 1882 – April 27, 1958) was an American prelate of the Roman Catholic Church. He served as bishop of the Diocese of Richmond in Virginia from 1945 until his death in 1958.

== Biography ==
=== Early life ===
Ireton was born on September 21, 1882, in Baltimore, Maryland to John and Mary (née Sheridan) Ireton; his father was from County Wexford, Ireland. He studied at St. Charles College in Catonsville, Maryland, and at St. Mary's Seminary in Baltimore.

Ireton was ordained to the priesthood for the Archdiocese of Baltimore by Cardinal James Gibbons on June 20, 1906. He then studied for a year at the Apostolic Mission House in Washington, D.C. Returning to Baltimore, Ireton served as a curate at St. Gregory's Parish in Baltimore until 1926, when he became pastor of St. Ann's Parish in Baltimore. He became instrumental in founding the Junior Holy Name Society and the Big Brother Movement. He was named a domestic prelate with the title of monsignor by the Vatican in 1929.

=== Coadjutor Bishop and Bishop of Richmond ===
On August 3, 1935, Ireton was appointed coadjutor bishop and apostolic administrator of Richmond and titular bishop of Cyme by Pope Pius XI. He received his episcopal consecration at the Baltimore Cathedral on October 23, 1935. His principal consecrator was Archbishop Michael Curley, with Bishops Thomas O'Reilly and James Ryan serving as co-consecrators.

Following the resignation of Bishop Andrew Brennan, Ireton automatically became the ninth bishop of Richmond on April 14, 1945. Ireton was named by the Vatican as an assistant at the pontifical throne in 1956. During his tenure as bishop, Ireton established 42 parishes, built 24 schools, and increased the Catholic population from 37,000 to 147,000.

=== Death and legacy ===
On April 26, 1958, Ireton became very ill after giving a presentation at Marymount University in Arlington, Virginia; he was rushed to Georgetown University Hospital in Washington, D.C. Peter Ireton died the next day at age 75.Bishop Ireton High School in Alexandria, Virginia is named in his honor.

Catholic Church titles
Preceded by Andrew James Louis Brennan	Bishop of Richmond; 1945—1958	Succeeded by John Joyce Russell
