= Cathedral of the Sacred Heart (Richmond, Virginia) =

Catholic church in Virginia, United States

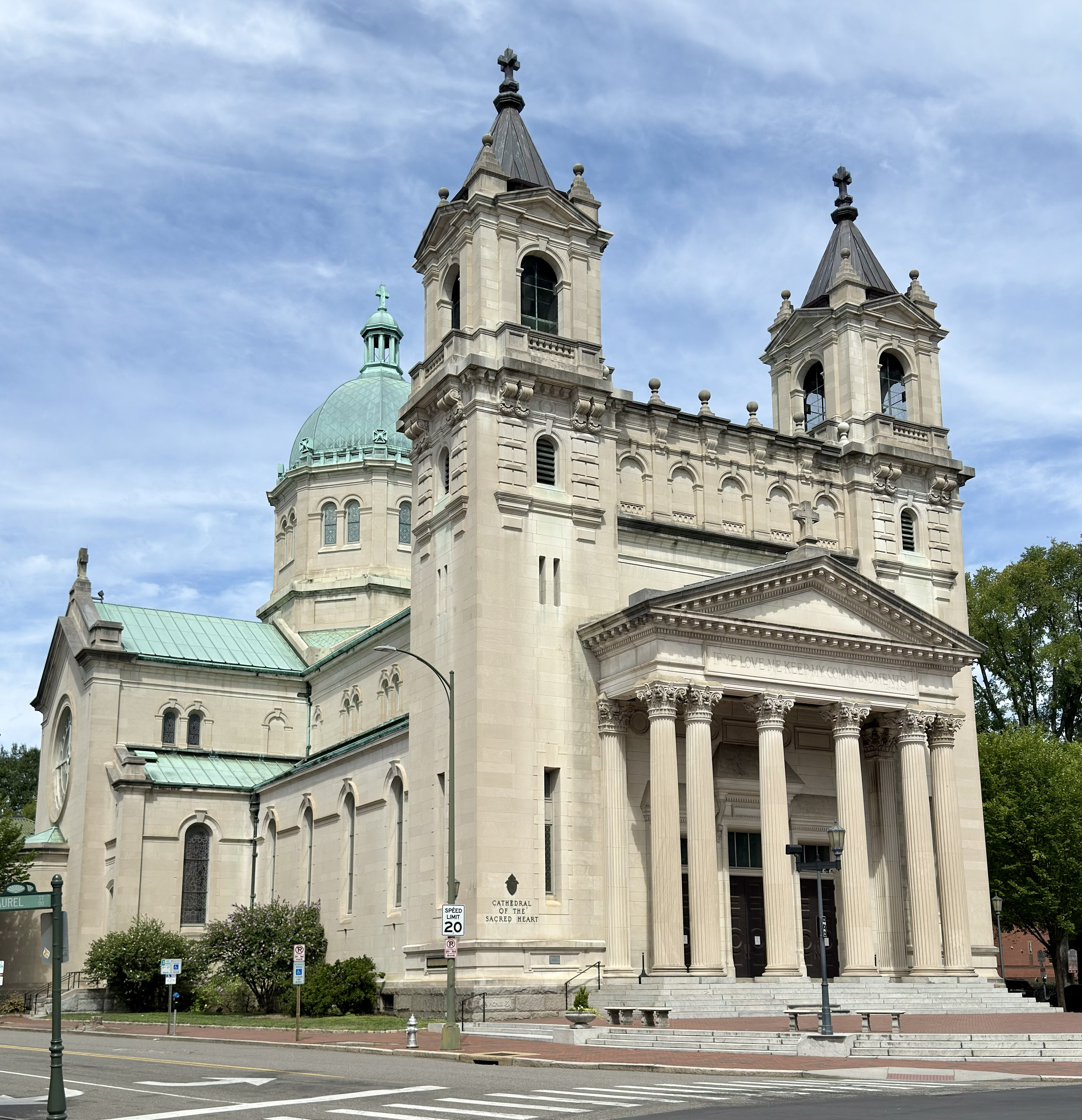
- Cathedral of the Sacred Heart in 2025

- Location within Virginia
- 37°32′50.8″N 77°27′7.7″W
- Location: 823 Cathedral Place; Richmond, Virginia
- Country: United States
- Denomination: Catholic
- Sui iuris church: Latin Church
- Tradition: Roman Rite
- Website: www.richmondcathedral.org

History
- Status: Cathedral
- Consecrated: November 29, 1906

Architecture
- Architect: Joseph Hubert McGuire
- Style: Renaissance Revival
- Groundbreaking: 1903
- Completed: 1905
- Construction cost: $19350000

Specifications
- Length: 206 feet (63 m)
- Width: 144 feet (44 m)
- Height: 144 feet (44 m)
- Materials: Virginia granite (foundation), Indiana limestone (walls), Copper (dome)

Administration
- Diocese: Diocese of Richmond

Clergy
- Bishop: Barry C. Knestout
- Rector: Anthony E. Marques

U.S. National Register of Historic Places
- Designated: July 8, 1982
- Reference no.: 82004584

U.S. Historic district – Contributing property
- Designated: July 5, 1984
- Part of: Monroe Park Historic District
- Reference no.: 84003572

Virginia Landmarks Register
- Designated: December 15, 1981
- Reference no.: 127-0137

The Cathedral of the Sacred Heart in Richmond, Virginia, is a Catholic cathedral that is the seat of the Diocese of Richmond. The property is located along North Laurel Street at 823 Cathedral Place, facing Monroe Park, one block north of Main Street. Construction of the cathedral was begun in 1903, financed by donations of Thomas Fortune Ryan and his wife; it was the only cathedral at that time known to be constructed by the exclusive patronage of a single family.

The cathedral was completed in 1905 and consecrated on November 29, 1906. The cathedral is a Virginia Historic Landmark and is on the National Register of Historic Places.

The Cathedral of the Sacred Heart hosts the Catholic campus ministry for Virginia Commonwealth University.

== Background ==
The first cathedral for the Diocese of Richmond was St. Peter's Cathedral, constructed in 1834. By the 1860s, Bishop John McGill realized that it was too small for the growing Catholic population in Richmond. He found a lot in the city for the new cathedral in 1867, but only had funds to purchase a small part of it. A fundraising attempt to buy the lot failed in 1886.

In 1901, Bishop Augustin Van de Vyver suggested to the philanthropists Thomas Fortune Ryan and Ida Mary Barry that they donate money to buy the remaining property and finally construct the new cathedral. Ryan and Barry donated $500,000 ($19,350,000 today) to cover the project costs.

== Construction ==
To design Sacred Heart Cathedral, Ryan and Barry chose architect Joseph Hubert McGuire of New York City, He created a masterplan for the cathedral, a bishop's residence and a rectory, filling the entire property. The cornerstone for Sacred Heart was laid June 4, 1903, by Reverend Conway of St. Ignatius Parish in New York City. The marble block for the cornerstone was sourced from the Garden of Gethsemane in Jerusalem.

Sacred Heart Cathedral was consecrated on November 29, 1906. According to a diocesan official at the time, Sacred Heart was the only cathedral in the world erected through the "sole munificence of one family".

After the Second Vatican Council of the early 1960s, the diocese radically altered the cathedral interior. They replaced the original high altar with a free-standing altar. The nave was expanded, allowing for a larger, more open sanctuary. The marble altar rails were removed and the confessionals repurposed into display cases. The iconography and statuary were removed from the sanctuary.

The diocese was forced to replace the Spanish tiles on the bell tower roofs in 2017 due to their deteriorated condition. During a thunderstorm, one tile fell onto a parked car. The diocese installed copper roofs on the towers, topping one with a copper cross.

In 2024, the diocese installed an Opus 55 pipe organ with over 4,330 pipes in the cathedral.

== Cathedral exterior ==
Sacred Heart Cathedral was designed with Italian Renaissance Revival architecture. The exterior is constructed from Virginia granite and Indiana limestone; ceramic tiles and a copper-jacketed dome 118 feet (36 m) across complete the roof. The cathedral's two bell towers rise 90 feet (27 m) above the ground and are topped with copper roofs.

The cathedral portico is supported by fluted Corinthian columns; the entablature features the phrase "If Ye Love Me Keep My Commandments". The underside of the pediment is lined with fireproof tiles designed by Rafael Guastavino.

== Landmark ==
Sacred Heart Cathedral is a Virginia Historic Landmark and is on the National Register of Historic Places.

== Gallery ==
Cathedral exterior (circa 1914)

Cathedral Interior (circa 1914)

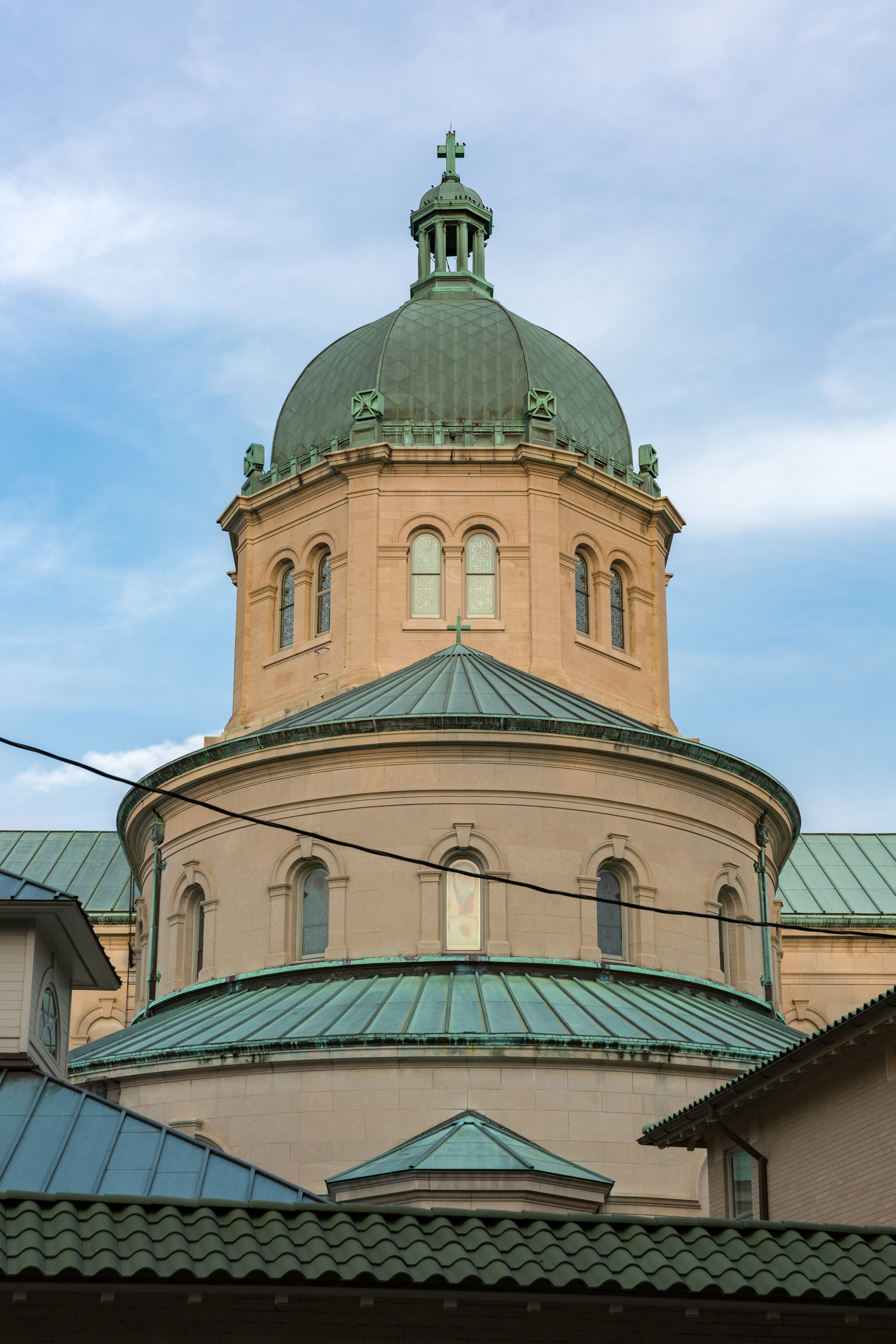
Cathedral absis and dome (2017)

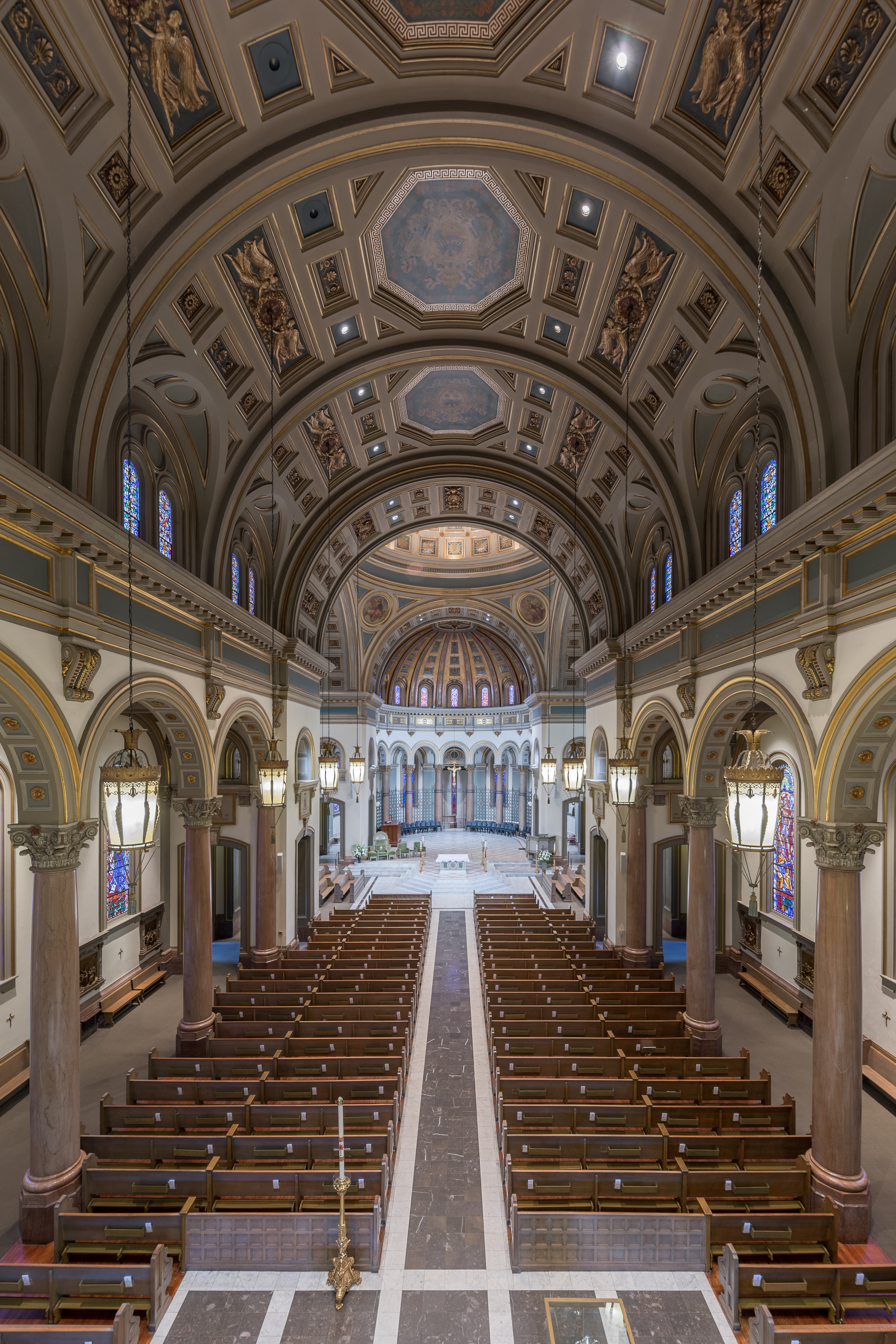
Chancel at end of cathedral nave (2017)

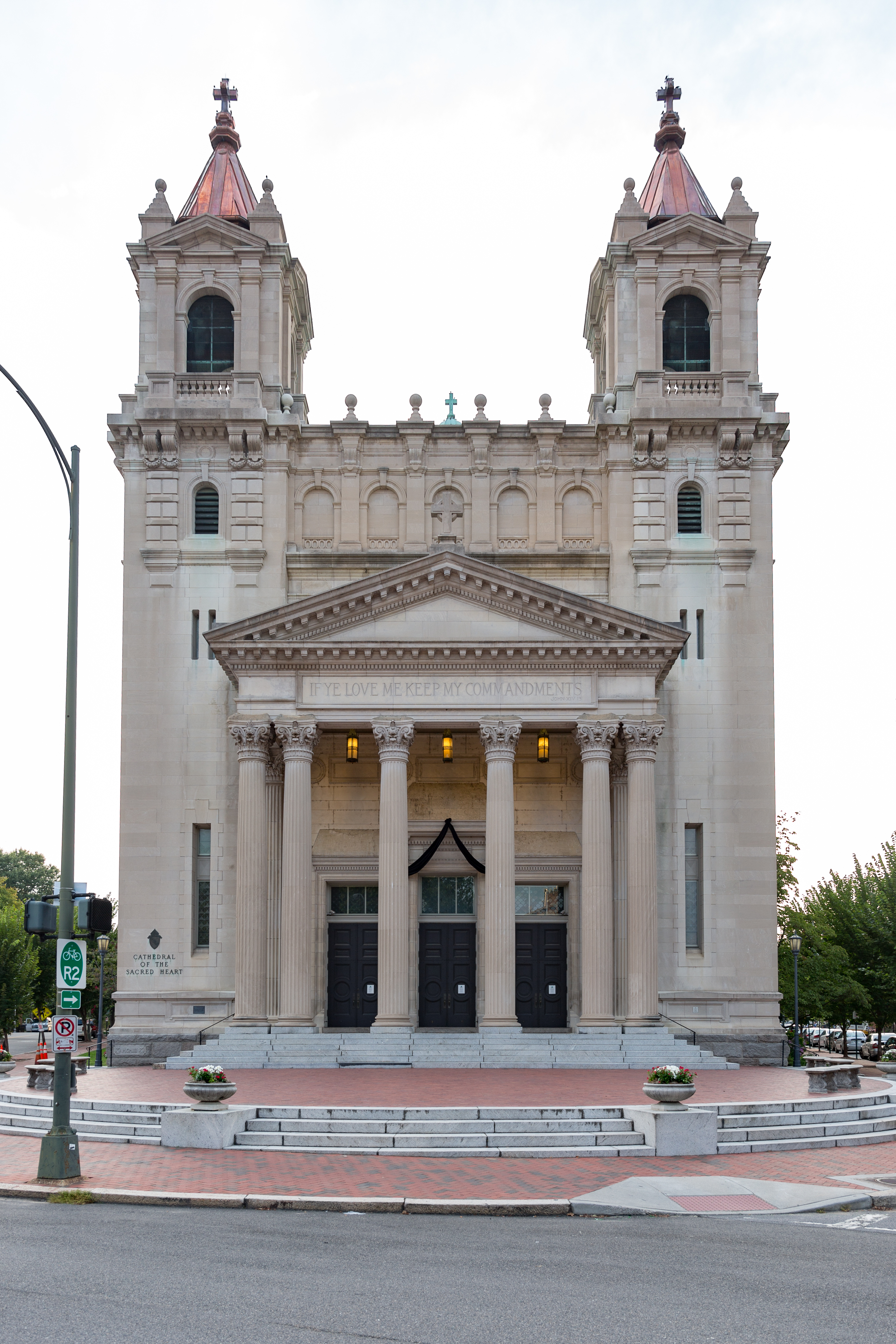
Western entrance to cathedral (2017)

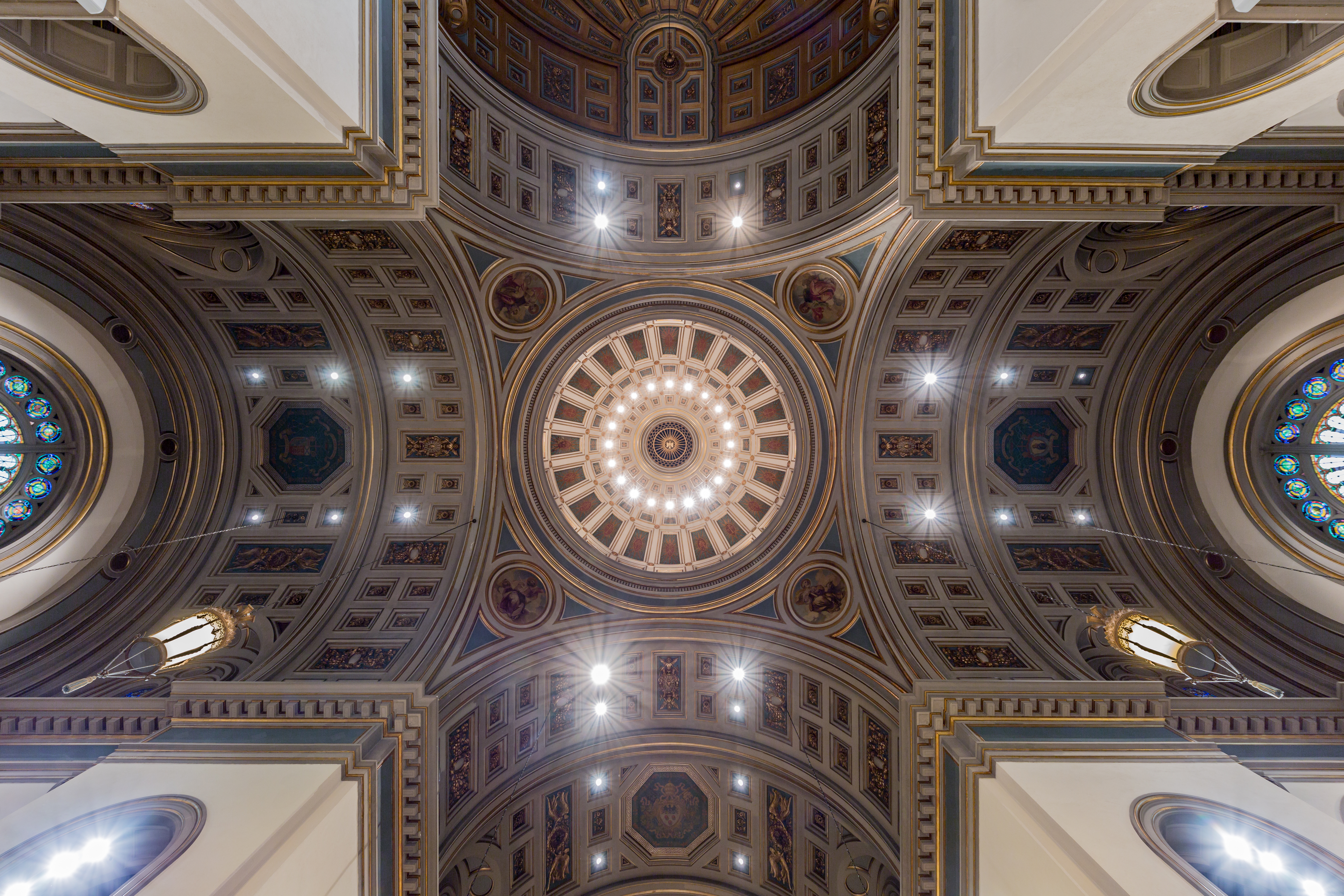
Crossing with dome in cathedral ceiling (2017)

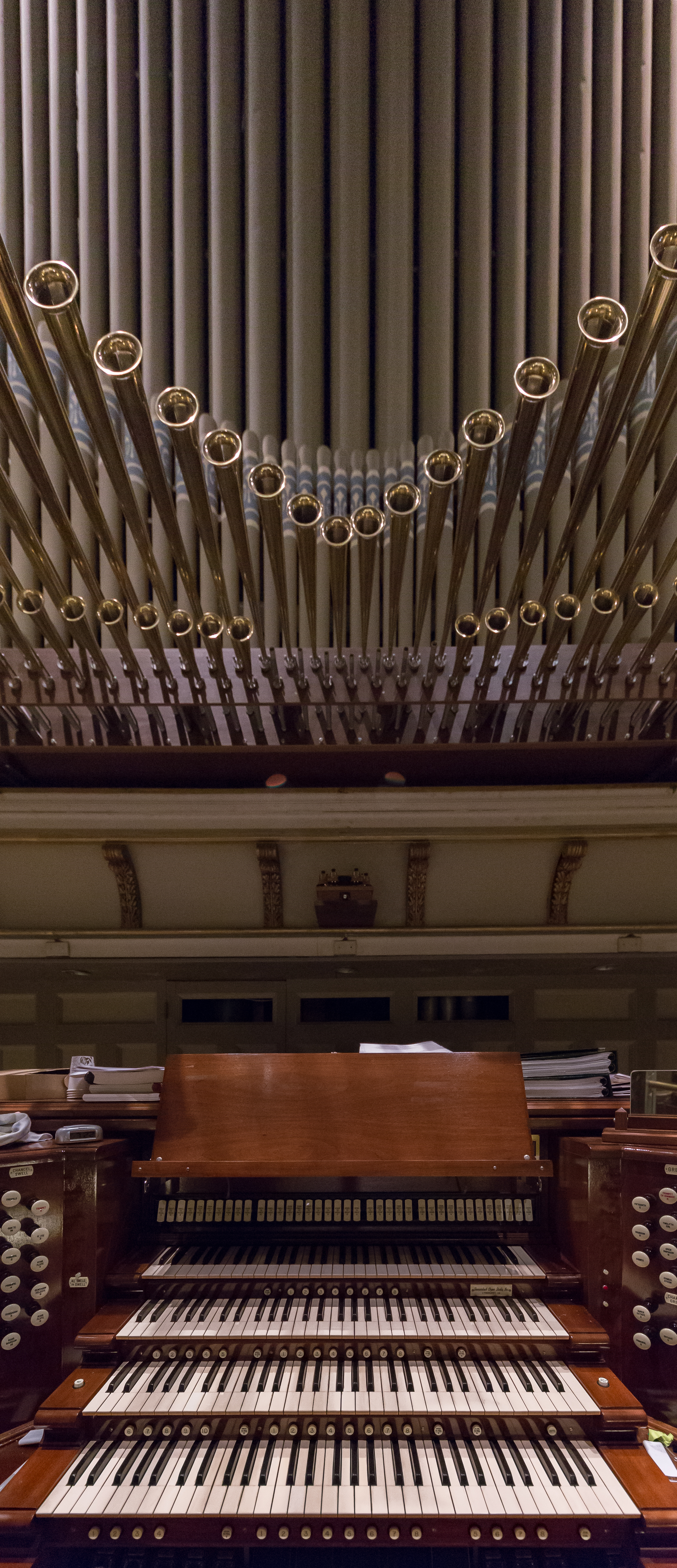
Pipe organ in cathedral (2017)

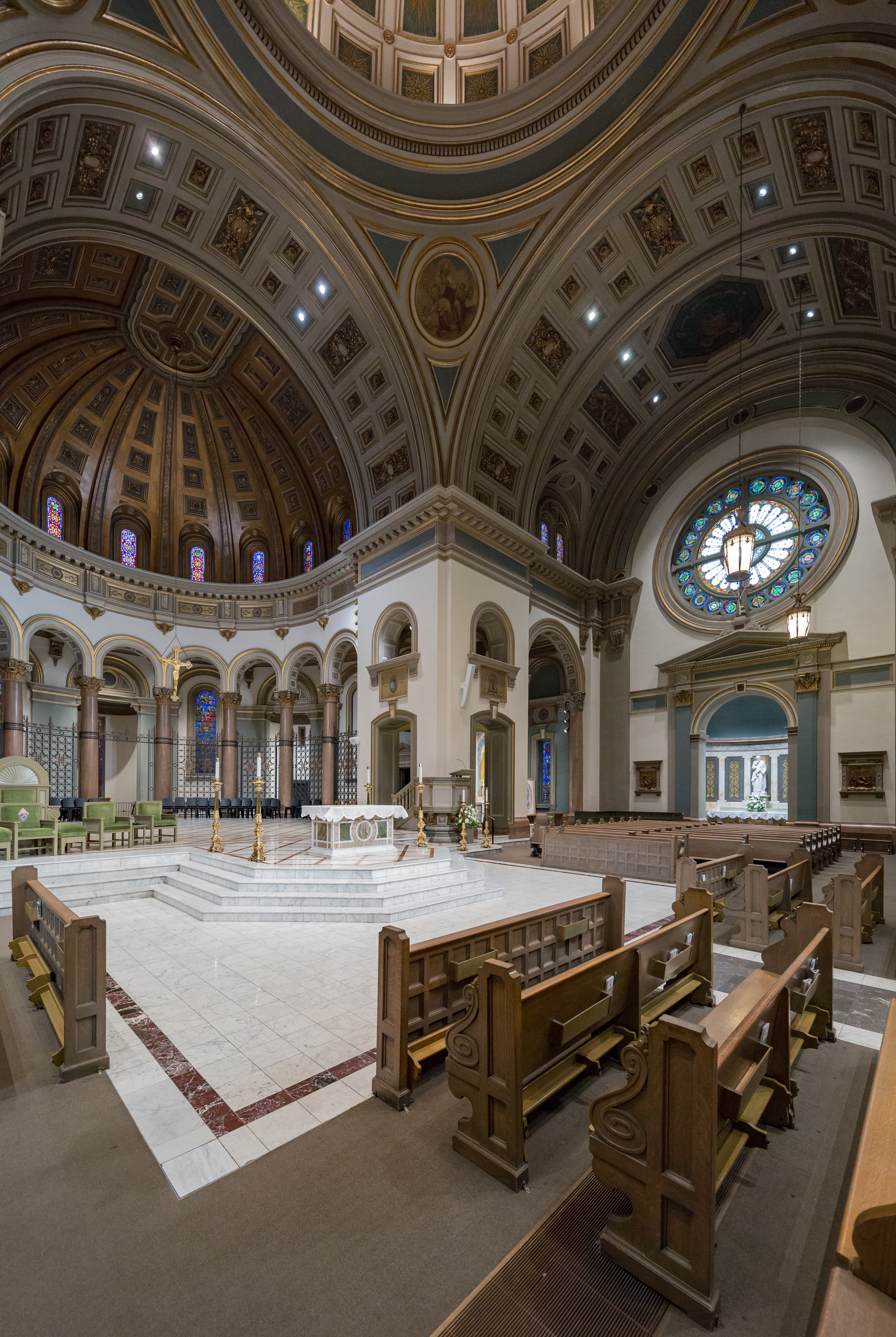
Main altar in cathedral sanctuary (2017)

== See also ==
- List of Catholic cathedrals in the United States
- List of cathedrals in the United States
