= List of South Carolina High School League football champions =

The South Carolina High School League (SCHSL) is an organization that regulates high school sports in South Carolina. Each year since 1916, the SCHSL has crowned a state champion in football. Every fall, a postseason consisting of a 32 school bracket is played to determine a winner.

The divisions for football are based on school enrollment. Divisions include:

- AAAAA (quin-A or 5A)
- AAAA (quad-A or 4A)
- AAA (triple-A or 3A)
- AA (double-A or 2A)
- A (one-A or 1A)

The SCHSL historically had a B and C division but these divisions are no longer used.

== Champions ==
=== AAAAA ===
Year	Champion	Champion Coach	Score	Runner-up	Runner-up Coach	Ref
2016	Dutch Fork	Tom Knotts	28-21	Boiling Springs	Rick Tate	
2017	Dutch Fork	Tom Knotts	28-27	Dorman	Dave Gutshall	
2018	Dutch Fork	Tom Knotts	59-20	T.L. Hanna	Jeff Heron	
2019	Dutch Fork	Tom Knotts	34-31	Dorman	Dave Gutshall	
2020	Dutch Fork	Tom Knotts	28-6	T.L. Hanna	Jason Tone	
2021	Gaffney	Dan Jones	22-19	Dutch Fork	Tom Knotts	
2022	Dutch Fork	Tom Knotts	47-10	Fort Dorchester	Steve LaPrad	
2023	Dutch Fork	Tom Knotts	21-6	White Knoll	Nick Pelham	
2024–present	See AAAAA Division I and II					

==== AAAAA Division I (2024–present) ====
Year	Champion	Champion Coach	Score	Runner-up	Runner-up Coach	Ref
2024	Dutch Fork	Tom Knotts	35–21	Summerville	Ian Rafferty	
2025	Dutch Fork	Tom Knotts	40–20	Summerville	Ian Rafferty	

==== AAAAA Division II (2024–present) ====
Year	Champion	Champion Coach	Score	Runner-up	Runner-up Coach	Ref
2024	Northwestern	Page Wofford	34–31	Irmo	Aaron Brand	
2025	Northwestern	Page Wofford	55–13	Irmo	Aaron Brand	

=== AAAA ===
Year	Champion	Champion Coach	Runner-up	Runner-up Coach	Ref
1968	Greenwood	J.W. Babb	Hartsville	Carroll Wright	
1969	Edmunds	Steve Satterfield	Gaffney	Robert E. Prevatte	
1969	Wilkinson	Shelley Wright	Barr Street	-	
1970	Lower Richland	Mooney Player	Eau Claire	Jimmy Satterfield	
1971	Orangeburg-Wilkinson	Dick Sheridan	Union	Paul Love	
1972	Easley	Larry Bagwell	Lower Richland	Mooney Player	
1973	Spring Valley	Joe Turbeville	Spartanburg	W.A. Carr	
1974	Spring Valley	Joe Turbeville	T.L. Hanna	James C. Fraser	
1975	Spring Valley	Joe Turbeville	Irmo	Reed Charpia	
1976	Greenwood	J.W. Babb	Summerville	John McKissick	
1977	Eastside	John P. Carlisle	Spring Valley	Joe Turbeville	
1978	Summerville	John McKissick	Irmo	Joe Turbeville	
1979	Summerville	John McKissick	Irmo	Joe Turbeville	
1980	Irmo	Joe Turbeville	Summerville	John McKissick	
1981-2015	See AAAA Division I and II				
2016	South Pointe	Strait Herron	Hartsville	Jeff Calabrese	
2017	South Pointe	Strait Herron	Hartsville	Jeff Calabrese	
2018	Myrtle Beach	Mickey Wilson	Greer	Will Young	
2019	Wren	Jeff Tate	Myrtle Beach	Mickey Wilson	
2020	A.C. Flora	Dustin Curtis	North Myrtle Beach	Matt Reel	
2021	South Pointe	Devonte' Holloman	Beaufort	Bryce Lybrand	
2022	South Florence	Drew Marlowe	Northwestern	Page Wofford	
2023	Westside	Brian Lane	South Florence	Drew Marlowe	
2024	South Florence	Drew Marlowe	Westside	Brian Lane	
2025	South Pointe	Bobby Collins	South Florence	Drew Marlowe	

==== AAAA Division I (1981-2015) ====
Year	Champion	Champion Coach	Score	Runner-up	Runner-up Coach	Ref
1981	Berkeley	Gerald Moody	18-15	Gaffney	A.L. Curtis	
1982	Summerville	John McKissick	23-13	Spartanburg	Fred Kyzer	
1983	Summerville	John McKissick	21-7	Gaffney	A.L. Curtis	
1984	Summerville	John McKissick	16-12	Spartanburg	Allen Sitterle	
1985	Gaffney	A.L. Curtis	41-30	Sumter	Tom Lewis	
1986	Summerville	John McKissick	28-3	Gaffney	A.L. Curtis	
1987	Sumter	Tom Lewis	24-21	Spartanburg	Allen Sitterle	
1988	Spring Valley	Jerry Brown	3-0	Gaffney	A.L. Curtis	
1989	Northwestern	Jimmy Wallace	21-6	Lancaster	Johnny Roscoe	
1990	Sumter	Tom Lewis	17-7	Rock Hill	Jim Ringer	
1991	Spartanburg	Doc Davis	28-16	Sumter	Tom Lewis	
1992	Gaffney	Joe Montgomery	27-24	Sumter	Tom Lewis	
1993	Northwestern	Jimmy Wallace	2-0	Gaffney	Joe Montgomery	
1994	Spartanburg	Doc Davis	24-17	Dorman	Dave Gutshall	
1995	Spartanburg	Doc Davis	28-14	Sumter	Tom Lewis	
1996	Spartanburg	Doc Davis	28-6	Rock Hill	Jim Ringer	
1997	Gaffney	Joe Montgomery	37-30	Northwestern	Jimmy Wallace	
1998	Summerville	John McKissick	31-23	Gaffney	Joe Montgomery	
1999	Stratford	Ray Stackley	24-17	Dorman	Dave Gutshall	
2000	Dorman	Dave Gutshall	31-24	Lexington	Jim Satterfield	
2001	Spartanburg	Doc Davis	24-21	Northwestern	Jimmy Wallace	
2002	Rock Hill	Jim Ringer	19-0	Irmo	Bob Hanna	
2003	Gaffney	Phil Strickland	28-21	Sumter	Paul Sorrells	
2004	Rock Hill	Jim Ringer	21-7	Stratford	Ray Stackley	
2005	Gaffney	Phil Strickland	33-32	Summerville	John McKissick	
2006	Gaffney	Phil Strickland	45-0	Irmo	Bob Hanna	
2007	Byrnes	Chris Miller	48-9	Summerville	John McKissick	
2008	Byrnes	Chris Miller	31-21	Sumter	Paul Sorrells	
2009	Dorman	Dave Gutshall	28-17	Byrnes	Chris Miller	
2010	Byrnes	Chris Miller	34-14	Dorman	Dave Gutshall	
2011	Byrnes	Chris Miller	31-24	Gaffney	Dan Jones	
2012	Gaffney	Dan Jones	34-22	Dutch Fork	Tom Knotts	
2013	Dutch Fork	Tom Knotts	54-14	Sumter	Reggie Kennedy	
2014	Hillcrest	Greg Porter	47-17	Dutch Fork	Tom Knotts	
2015	Fort Dorchester	Steve LaPrad	59-31	Dorman	Dave Gutshall	

==== AAAA Division II (1981-2015) ====
Year	Champion	Champion Coach	Runner-up	Runner-up Coach	Ref
1981	Hartsville	Johnny Roscoe	Airport	Les Evans	
1982	Middleton	Jim Werden	Northwestern	Bobby Ivey	
1983	Laurens	Buddy Jennings	Walterboro	Gyles Hall	
1984	Laurens	Buddy Jennings	Hartsville	Lewis Lineberger	
1985	Hillcrest	Tom McIntyre	Byrnes	Bo Corne	
1986	Byrnes	Bo Corne	Berkeley	Gerald Moody	
1987	Hartsville	Lewis Lineberger	Westside	Ted Luckadoo	
1988	Hartsville	Lewis Lineberger	North Augusta	Bill Utsey	
1989	North Augusta	Bill Utsey	Lower Richland	Bill Kimrey	
1990	Union	Shell Dula	Lancaster	Johnny Roscoe	
1991	Laurens	Bobby Ivey	Lower Richland	Bill Kimrey	
1992	Aiken	Doug Painter	Hartsville	Lewis Lineberger	
1993	Richland Northeast	Joe Wingard	Hartsville	Lewis Lineberger	
1994	Berkeley	Jerry Brown	Dillon	Jackie Hayes	
1995	Union	Shell Dula	Walterboro	Leroy Riley	
1996	Berkeley	Jerry Brown	Darlington	Gerald Harrison	
1997	Walterboro	Leroy Riley	Hartsville	Lewis Lineberger	
1998	Marlboro County	Dean Boyd	Ridge View	Kirk Burnett	
1999	Greenwood	Shell Dula	Aiken	Carey Johnson	
2000	Greenwood	Shell Dula	Aiken	Carey Johnson	
2001	Marlboro County	Dean Boyd	Conway	Chuck Jordan	
2002	Byrnes	Bobby Bentley	Conway	Chuck Jordan	
2003	Byrnes	Bobby Bentley	Conway	Chuck Jordan	
2004	Byrnes	Bobby Bentley	Irmo	Bob Hanna	
2005	Byrnes	Bobby Bentley	Richland Northeast	Jay Frye	
2006	Greenwood	Shell Dula	Conway	Chuck Jordan	
2007	Clover	Jet Turner	Beaufort	Mark Clifford	
2008	South Pointe	Bobby Carroll	Northwestern	Jimmy Wallace	
2009	Berkeley	Jerry Brown	Northwestern	Jimmy Wallace	
2010	Northwestern	Jimmy Wallace	Greenwood	Gene Cathcart	
2011	Goose Creek	Check Reedy	Greenwood	Gene Cathcart	
2012	Greenwood	Gene Cathcart	Northwestern	Kyle Richardson	
2013	Northwestern	Kyle Richardson	Stratford	Ray Stackley	
2014	Spartanburg	Chris Miller	York	Bobby Carroll	
2015	Northwestern	Kyle Richardson	Lexington	Josh Stepp	

=== AAA ===
Year	Champion	Champion Coach	Runner-up	Runner-up Coach	Ref
1957	Dreher	Charlie Stuart	Greenwood	J.W. Babb	
1958	Anderson	-	-	-	
1959	Dreher	Charlie Stuart	Greenwood	J.W. Babb	
1960	Gaffney	Bob Prevatte	Greenwood	J.W. Babb	
1961	Greenwood	J.W. Babb	Gaffney	Bob Prevatte	
1962	Greenville	J.A. Moore	Greenwood	J.W. Babb	
1963	Gaffney	Bob Prevatte	Greenwood	J.W. Babb	
1964	Gaffney	Bob Prevatte	Eau Claire	Art Baker	
1965	Gaffney	Bob Prevatte	Greenwood	J.W. Babb	
1966	Brookland-Cayce	Bettis Herlong	Rock Hill	Tommy Oates	
1967	Eau Claire	Steve Robertson	Rock Hill	Tommy Oates	
1968	James Island	Rupert E. Drews	Woodruff	W.L. Varner	
1969	Westside	William Roberts	-	Butler	
1970	Palmetto	Charlie D. Martin	Southside (F)	R.E. Wilson	
1971	Abbeville	Preston Cox	Pageland	W.E. Few	
1972	Clinton	Keith Richardson	Hanahan	Billy Siegler	
1973	Fort Johnson	Wayne Sweeney	Clinton	Keith Richardson	
1974	James Island	Reed Charpia	Clinton	Keith Richardson	
1975	Clinton	Keith Richardson	Myrtle Beach	Doug Shaw	
1976	Byrnes	Dalton Rivers	Bishop England	John Cantey	
1977	Clinton	Keith Richardson	James Island	Pascal Crosby	
1978	Clinton	Keith Richardson	James Island	Pascal Crosby	
1979	Cheraw	Burney Bourne	Strom Thurmond	Keith McAlister	
1980	Myrtle Beach	Doug Shaw	Strom Thurmond	Keith McAlister	
1981	Myrtle Beach	Doug Shaw	Broome	Dalton Rivers	
1982	Byrnes	Bo Corne	Myrtle Beach	Doug Shaw	
1983	Myrtle Beach	Doug Shaw	Clinton	Keith Richardson	
1984	Myrtle Beach	Doug Shaw	J.L. Mann	Bill Utsey	
1985	Clinton	Keith Richardson	Middleton	Jim Werden	
1986	York	Bill Pate	Strom Thurmond	Keith McAlister	
1987	Clinton	Keith Richardson	Marion	Bob Rankin	
1988	Manning	Charlie Combs	Daniel	Dick Singleton	
1989	Greer	Stuart Holcombe	Aiken	Dusty Triplett	
1990	Camden	Billy Ammons	Hilton Head	Dan Utley	
1991	Daniel	Allen Sitterle	Stall	Jerry Stoots	
1992	Daniel	Allen Sitterle	Cheraw	Burney Bourne	
1993	Cheraw	Burney Bourne	Clinton	Andy B. Young	
1994	Greer	Stuart Holcombe	Manning	Andrew Heddy	
1995	Daniel	Allen Sitterle	Strom Thurmond	Brian Smith	
1996	Fairfield-Central	Buddy Pough	Seneca	Tom Bass	
1997	Fairfield-Central	Tony Felder	Daniel	Allen Sitterle	
1998	Daniel	Allen Sitterle	Manning	Barry Avant	
1999	Union	Mike Anthony	Dillon	Jackie Hayes	
2000	Union	Mike Anthony	Manning	Barry Avant	
2001	Camden	Jimmy Neal	Union	Mike Anthony	
2002	Union	Mike Anthony	Camden	Jimmy Neal	
2003	Greer	Travis Perry	West Florence	Jeff Calebrese	
2004	Belton-Honea Path	Wayne Green	Dillon	Jackie Hayes	
2005	Strom Thurmond	Lee Sawyer	Clinton	Andy Young	
2006	Blythewood	Jeff Scott	Timberland	Art Craig	
2007	Wilson	Darryl Page	Chester	Victor Floyd	
2008	Myrtle Beach	Scott Earley	Chester	Maurice Flowers	
2009	Clinton	Andy Young	Myrtle Beach	Mickey Wilson	
2010	Myrtle Beach	Mickey Wilson	South Pointe	Bobby Carroll	
2011	South Pointe	Strait Herron	Bluffton	Ken Cribb	
2012	Hartsville	Jeff Calabrese	Union County	Steve Taneyhill	
2013	Myrtle Beach	Mickey Wilson	Daniel	Randy Robinson	
2014	South Pointe	Strait Herron	Hartsville	Jeff Calabrese	
2015	South Pointe	Strait Herron	Midland Valley	Rick Knight	
2016	Chapman	Mark Hodges	Dillon	Jackie Hayes	
2017	Dillon	Jackie Hayes	Chapman	Mark Hodges	
2018	Chester	Victor Floyd	Dillon	Jackie Hayes	
2019	Chapman	Mark Hodges	Dillon	Jackie Hayes	
2020	Daniel	Jeff Fruster	Camden	Brian Rimpf	
2021	Daniel	Jeff Fruster	Camden	Brian Rimpf	
2022	Beaufort	Bryce Lybrand	Powdersville	Robert Mustar	
2023	Daniel	Jeff Fruster	Camden	Brian Rimpf	
2024	Oceanside Collegiate	John Patterson	Belton-Honea Path	Russell Blackston	
2025	Oceanside Collegiate	Brent LaPrad	Belton-Honea Path	Russell Blackston	

=== AA ===
Year	Champion	Champion Coach	Runner-up	Runner-up Coach	Ref
1944	Rock Hill	Walter Jenkins	-	-	
1945	Rock Hill	Walter Jenkins	-	-	
1946	North Charleston	-	Camden	-	
1947	Greenwood	J.W. Babb	North Charleston	-	
1948	Greenwood	J.W. Babb	-	-	
1949	Florence	-	Anderson	-	
1950	Dreher	Red Myers	-	-	
1951	North Charleston	-	Greenville	AJ "Slick" Moore	
1952	Rock Hill	Dusty Oates Sr.	Conway	-	
1953	Dreher	Red Myers	-	-	
1954	Florence	-	Greenwood	J.W. Babb	
1955	Dreher	Red Myers	-	-	
1956	Camden	-	Lancaster	-	
1957	North Augusta	Cally Gault	Lancaster	-	
1958	Lancaster	Wade Corn	Winyah	J.C. Hudson	
1959	Orangeburg	G.E. Runager	Easley	W.A. Carr	
1960	North Augusta	Cally Gault	Clinton	Claude Howe	
1961	Easley	W.A. Carr	Garrett	Gene Limehouse	
1962	Chester	R.E. Wilson	Eau Claire	Art Baker	
1963	Camden	W.L. Lynch	Easley	W.A. Carr	
1964	Woodruff	W.L. Varner	Berkeley	Gerald Moody	
1965	Daniel	Dick Singleton	Berkeley	Gerald Moody	
1966	Easley	Larry Bagwell	St. Andrews	Jerry Weed	
1967	Strom Thurmond	Hubert Morris	Laurens	Ray Spoon	
1968	Winnsboro	Joe Turbeville	Strom Thurmond	Hubert Morris	
1969	Webber	-	Voorhees	-	
1970	Lake View	W.L. Pate	Leavelle McCampbell	William D. Kight	
1971	Lake View	W.L. Pate	St. Angela	H.C. Caver	
1972	Bishopville	J.W. Jones	Woodruff	W.L. Varner	
1973	Chapin	Cecil Woolbright	Bamberg-Ehrhardt	Leon Maxwell	
1974	Chapin	Cecil Woolbright	Bamberg-Ehrhardt	Leon Maxwell	
1975	Woodruff	W.L. Varner	Bamberg-Ehrhardt	Leon Maxwell	
1976	Woodruff	W.L. Varner	Lake View	W.L. Pate	
1977	Woodruff	W.L. Varner	Mayo	Virgil G. Wells	
1978	Woodruff	W.L. Varner	Andrews	Simon Lewis	
1979	Batesburg-Leesville	S. Edward Porter	Woodruff	W.L. Varner	
1980	Woodruff	W.L. Varner	Swansea	Doug Bennett	
1981	Abbeville	Mike Hendricks	Wade Hampton	Arlo Hill	
1982	Ninety Six	Shell Dula	Barnwell	Mac Wier	
1983	Woodruff	W.L. Varner	St. John's (JI)	Bob Biggerstaff	
1984	Woodruff	W.L. Varner	St. John's (JI)	Bob Biggerstaff	
1985	Mid-Carolina	Lon Armstrong	Barnwell	Mac Wier	
1986	Silver Bluff	Clayton Chriswell	Batesburg-Leesville	Gary Smallen	
1987	Barnwell	Mac Wier	Central	Al Usher	
1988	Barnwell	Mac Wier	Central	Al Usher	
1989	Central	Al Usher	Bamberg-Ehrhardt	Leon Maxwell	
1990-1991	See AA Division I and II				
1992	Swansea	Robert Maddox	Batesburg-Leesville	Phil Strickland	
1993	Swansea	Robert Maddox	Woodruff	W.L. Varner	
1994	Swansea	Robert Maddox	Central	Al Usher	
1995	Batesburg-Leesville	Phil Strickland	Barnwell	Mac Wier	
1996	Abbeville	Dennis Botts	Allendale-Fairfax	Barry Avant	
1997	Central	Al Usher	Barnwell	Mac Wier	
1998	Emerald	Frank Hill	Batesburg-Leesville	Phil Strickland	
1999	Batesburg-Leesville	Phil Strickland	Ninety Six	Mike Doolittle	
2000	Silver Bluff	Al Lown	Abbeville	Dennis Botts	
2001	Silver Bluff	Al Lown	Batesburg-Leesville	Phil Strickland	
2002	Carvers Bay	Nate Thompson	Abbeville	Dennis Botts	
2003	Central	Joey Mangum	Batesburg-Leesville	Courtney McInnis	
2004	Broome	Bill Owens	Cheraw	Johnny White	
2005	Batesburg-Leesville	Courtney McInnis	Cheraw	Johnny White	
2006	Cheraw	Johnny White	Newberry	Sam Baird	
2007	Cheraw	Johnny White	Chapman	Kevin Farmer	
2008	Dillon	Jackie Hayes	Central	Joey Mangum	
2009	Dillon	Jackie Hayes	Central	Joey Mangum	
2010	Central	Joey Mangum	Dillon	Jackie Hayes	
2011-2015	See AA Division I and II				
2016	Abbeville	James Nickles	Batesburg-Leesville	Perry Woolbright	
2017	Abbeville	James Nickles	Bamberg-Ehrhardt	Kevin Crosby	
2018	Abbeville	James Nickles	Barnwell	Dwayne Garrick	
2019	Saluda	Stewart Young	Barnwell	Dwayne Garrick	
2020	Abbeville	James Nickles	Marion	Randall State	
2021	Gray Collegiate	Adam Holmes	Silver Bluff	De'Angelo Bryant	
2022	Abbeville	James Nickles	Oceanside Collegiate	Chad Wilkes	
2023	Oceanside Collegiate	Chad Wilkes	Gray Collegiate	Adam Holmes	
2024	Clinton	Corey Fountain	Barnwell	Brian Smith	
2025	Strom Thurmond	Andrew Webb	Hampton County	Robert Hanna	

==== AA Division I (1990-1991, 2011-2015) ====
Year	Champion	Champion Coach	Runner-up	Runner-up Coach	Ref
1990	Silver Bluff	Butch Jacobs	Central	Al Usher	
1991	Silver Bluff	Butch Jacobs	Woodruff	Willie Varner	
2011	Timberland	Art Craig	Woodruff	Brian Lane	
2012	Dillon	Jackie Hayes	Fairfield-Central	Demetrius Davis	
2013	Dillon	Jackie Hayes	Fairfield-Central	Demetrius Davis	
2014	Dillon	Jackie Hayes	Newberry	Phil Strickland	
2015	Dillon	Jackie Hayes	Newberry	Phil Strickland	

==== AA Division II (1990-1991, 2011-2015) ====
Year	Champion	Champion Coach	Runner-up	Runner-up Coach	Ref
1990	Bamberg-Ehrhardt	Leon Maxwell	Andrew Jackson	Andy Tweito	
1991	Abbeville	Dennis Botts	Swansea	Robert Maddox	
2011	Bishop England	John Cantey	Central	Joey Mangum	
2012	Bishop England	John Cantey	Abbeville	Jamie Mickles	
2013	Batesburg-Leesville	Jerry Brown	Silver Bluff	Al Lown	
2014	Timberland	Art Craig	Keenan	Quinn McCollum	
2015	Abbeville	James Nickles	Silver Bluff	Al Lown	

=== A ===
Year	Champion	Champion Coach	Runner-up	Runner-up Coach	Ref
1932	Spartanburg	Red Dobson	Gaffney	L.F. Carson	
1933	Columbia	-	-	-	
1934	Gaffney	Harry Harmon	Spartanburg	Red Dobson	
1935	Chester	L.A. Spearman	Gaffney	Harry Harmon	
1936	Chester	-	Camden	-	
1937	Easley	-	Camden	-	
1938	Columbia	Rhame	Gaffney	Harry Harmon	
1939	Columbia/Parker	Rhame/-	-	-	
1940	Greenville/Anderson	Speer/Dillard	-	-	
1941	No Results				
1942	Anderson	-	-	-	
1943	Greenville/Columbia	-/Rhame	-	-	
1944	Camden	-	-	-	
1945	Honea Path	J.H. Coleman	Aiken	-	
1946	No Results				
1947	Dillon	Dudley Saleeby	Walhalla	-	
1948	Lexington	J.W. Ingram	Dillon	Dudley Saleeby	
1949	Lexington	J.W. Ingram	-	-	
1950	Lexington	J.W. Ingram	Aynor	Jack Hall	
1951	Aynor	Jack Hall	-	-	
1952	Pickens	-	Lake City	-	
1953	Mullins	-	Pickens	-	
1954	Mullins	-	Pickens	-	
1955	St. Andrews	-	Olympia	Bobby Giles	
1956	Woodruff	W.L. Varner	St. Andrews	-	
1957	Woodruff	W.L. Varner	Langley-Bath-Clear	-	
1958	Winnsboro	Bob Donaldson	Batesburg-Leesville	Gus Allen	
1959	Winnsboro	Bob Donaldson	Berkeley	Gerald Moody	
1960	Berkeley	Gerald Moody	York	Jack Miller	
1961	Lake View	James F. Piner	Honea Path	Norman King	
1962	Saluda	Mooney Player	Woodruff	W.L. Varner	
1963	Saluda	Mooney Player	York	Jack Miller	
1964	Ware Shoals	Richard C. Weber	Lexington	J.W. Ingram	
1965	Lower Richland	Mooney Player	Ware Shoals	John T. Lay	
1966	Pendleton	Ronald D. Grace	Batesburg-Leesville	W.R. McGill	
1967	Lower Richland	Mooney Player	Winnsboro	Joe Turbeville	
1968	St. John's (JI)	Bob Biggerstaff	Heath Springs	Sidney Cauthen	
1969	Carver	-	Edgewood	-	
1970	Blackville	Jim Phillips	Swansea	Douglas Bennett	
1971	Lockhart	Lawrence Vanderford	Blackville	Jim Phillips	
1972	North	Kermit Littlefield	Whitmire	William O. Johnson	
1973	McColl	Clyde Parrish	Jonesville	Jerry Cash	
1974	Swansea	Douglas Bennett	Jackson	Wayne Marchant	
1975	Swansea	Douglas Bennett	Calhoun Falls	Joe Rosser	
1976	Blacksburg	Bob Blanton	H.E. McCracken	Daniel Utley	
1977	Christ Church	Harry Sprouse	H.E. McCracken	Daniel Utley	
1978	Whitmire	William O. Johnson	Williston-Elko	James E. Hewitt	
1979	Williston-Elko	James E. Hewitt	Jonesville	Jerry Cash	
1980	Williston-Elko	James E. Hewitt	Whitmire	Jim D. Rich	
1981	Lake View	W.L. Pate	Whitmire	Jim D. Rich	
1982	Ware Shoals	Tommy E. Davis	Blackville-Hilda	Tim Moore	
1983	Blackville-Hilda	Tim Moore	Ware Shoals	Tommy E. Davis	
1984	Blackville-Hilda	Tim Moore	Lewisville	Jimmy Wallace	
1985	East Clarendon	Mickey Moss	Timmonsville	Bill Tate	
1986	Lewisville	Jimmy Wallace	Timmonsville	Bill Tate	
1987	Lewisville	Bennie McMurray	Aynor	David Maness	
1988	Blackville-Hilda	Mike Pope	Aynor	David Maness	
1989	Lake View	Jewell McLaurin	Lewisville	Bennie McMurray	
1990	Jonesville	Pat Littlejohn	Lake View	Jewell McLaurin	
1991	See A Division I and II				
1992	Timmonsville	Bill Tate	Lake View	Jewell McLaurin	
1993	Johnsonville	Doug Hinson	Buford	Ernie Hughes	
1994	Choppee	John H. Spears	Timmonsville	Bill Tate	
1995	Blackville-Hilda	David Berry	Timmonsville	Bill Tate	
1996	Lewisville	Bennie McMurray	Johnsonville	Doug Hinson	
1997	Lake View	Jewell McLaurin	McCormick	Michael Allen	
1998	Lewisville	Bennie McMurray	Johnsonville	Doug Hinson	
1999	Timmonsville	Bill Tate	Williston-Elko	Charlie Combs	
2000	Ninety Six	Mike Doolittle	Lamar	J.R. Boyd	
2001	Ninety Six	Mike Doolittle	Timmonsville	Bill Tate	
2002	Lamar	J.R. Boyd	Lake View	Jewell McLaurin	
2003	Lamar	J.R. Boyd	Lake View	Jewell McLaurin	
2004	Lamar	J.R. Boyd	Calhoun Falls	Eddie Roberts	
2005	Blackville-Hilda	David Berry	Calhoun County	Tommy Brown	
2006-2015	See A Division I and II				
2016	Lake View	Daryl King	Lamar	Corey Fountain	
2017	Lamar	Corey Fountain	Baptist Hill	Marion Brown	
2018	Green Sea-Floyds	Donnie Keifer	Lamar	Corey Fountain	
2019	Green Sea-Floyds	Donnie Keifer	Ridge Spring-Monetta	Brian Smith	
2020	Southside Christian	Mike Sonneborn	Lake View	Daryl King	
2021	Southside Christian	Mike Sonneborn	Bamberg-Ehrhardt	Robert Williams	
2022	Christ Church	Quin Hatfield	Johnsonville	Ken Cribb	
2023	Christ Church	Quin Hatfield	Johnsonville	Ken Cribb	
2024	Abbeville	Jamie Nickles	Cross	Shaun Wright	
2025	Bamberg-Ehrhardt	Corey Crosby	Lamar	Tyler Boyd	

==== A Division I (1991, 2006-2015) ====
Year	Champion	Champion Coach	Runner-up	Runner-up Coach	Ref
1991	Great Falls	Danny Sawyer	Timmonsville	Bill Tate	
2006	Carvers Bay	James Thompson	Chesterfield	Steve Tanneyhill	
2007	Chesterfield	Steve Tanneyhill	Carvers Bay	James Thompson	
2008	Chesterfield	Steve Tanneyhill	Carvers Bay	James Thompson	
2009	Chesterfield	Steve Tanneyhill	Lamar	J.R. Boyd	
2010	Abbeville	James Nickles	Bamberg-Ehrhardt	Kevin Crosby	
2011	Abbeville	James Nickles	Hemingway	Ken Cribb	
2012	Christ Church	Don Frost	Johnsonville	Lewis Lineberger	
2013	Christ Church	Don Frost	Carvers Bay	Nate Thompson	
2014	Christ Church	Don Frost	Bamberg-Ehrhardt	Kevin Crosby	
2015	Southside Christian	Jason Kaiser	Allendale-Fairfax	Eddie Ford	

==== A Division II (1991, 2006-2015) ====
Year	Champion	Champion Coach	Runner-up	Runner-up Coach	Ref
1991	Lake View	Jewell McLaurin	Lewisville	Bennie McMurray	
2006	Lake View	Jewell McLaurin	Ridge Spring-Monetta	Mark Rogers	
2007	Blackville-Hilda	David Berry	Great Falls	Kenneth Schofield	
2008	Scott's Branch	James Johnson	Williston-Elko	Dwayne Garrick	
2009	Williston-Elko	Dwayne Garrick	Scott's Branch	James Johnson	
2010	Scott's Branch	James Johnson	Williston-Elko	Dwayne Garrick	
2011	Christ Church	Don Frost	Lake View	Daryl King	
2012	Cross	Shaun Wright	McCormick	Brian Neal	
2013	Hunter-Kinard-Tyler	Dan Holland	Timmonsville	Bill Tate	
2014	Hunter-Kinard-Tyler	Dan Holland	Lake View	Daryl King	
2015	Lamar	Corey Fountain	C.E. Murray	-	

=== B ===
Year	Champion	Champion Coach	Runner-up	Runner-up Coach
1926	Thornwell	-	Mullins	-
1927	Batesburg-Leesville	Jack Wilson	Lancaster	-
1928	Batesburg-Leesville	Jack Wilson	Chester	-
1929	Chester	-	Camden	-
1930	Chester	-	Marion	-
1931	Camden	-	Chester	-
1932	Chester	-	Camden	-
1933	Johnston	-	Camden	-
1934	Great Falls	-	Camden	-
1935	Beaufort	-	Great Falls	-
1936	Camden	-	Honea Path	-
1937	Honea Path	-	North Charleston	-
1938	Lake View	Harry Bolick	Clinton	Robert P. Wilder
1939	Clinton	Robert P. Wilder	Lake View	Harry Bolick
1940	Kingstree	Jimmy Welch	Olympia	Bill Simpson
1941	Saluda	Tommy Hite	Marion	Cliff Morgan
1942	No Results			
1943	Olympia	Zip Hanna	Allendale	-
1944	Mullins	Edgar Cox	Olympia	Lit Durham
1945	Beaufort	-	Clover	-
1946	Mullins	-	Olympia	Lit Durham
1947	Liberty	-	Summerville	Harvey Kirkland
1948	Summerville	Harvey Kirkland	Olympia	Lit Durham
1949	Summerville	Harvey Kirkland	-	-
1950	Moultrie	-	North Augusta	-
1951	Kershaw	Marion Boan	Mullins	-
1952	St. Andrews	Hazel Gillstrap	Olympia	Bobby Giles
1953	Olympia	Bobby Giles	Berkeley	Gerald Moody
1954	Barnwell	Charlie Seay	Langley-Bath-Clearwater	Clyde Parrish
1955	Summerville	John McKissick	Saluda	Bettis Herlong
1956	Summerville	John McKissick	Saluda	Bettis Herlong
1957	Johnston	-	Ridgeland	-
1958	St. Matthews	Thad Ott	Ninety Six	-
1959	Johnston	Vernon Dusenbury	St. Matthews	Thad Ott
1960	Swansea	Douglas Bennett	St. Matthews	Thad Ott
1961	East Clarendon	H.E. Hall	Swansea	Douglas Bennett
1962	Ninety Six	Jack Pitts	East Clarendon	H.E. Hall
1963	Bamberg	Dick Weldon	Dixie	Henry C. Oates
1964	Kershaw	W.E. Few	Bamberg	Dick Weldon
1965	East Clarendon	H.E. Hall	Kershaw	W.E. Few
1966	Kershaw	W.E. Few	Lamar	John Socha
1967	Allendale-Fairfax	Bobby McLellan	Kershaw	W.E. Few

=== C ===
Year	Champion	Champion Coach	Runner-up	Runner-up Coach
1932	Ninety Six	-	Sardis	-
1933	No Results			
1934	Epworth Orphanage	-	Summerville	-
1935	Epworth Orphanage	-	Olanta	-
1936	St. Paul's	-	Epworth Orphanage	-
1937	Epworth Orphanage	Ernest Correll	Greeleyville	-
1938	Epworth Orphanage	Ernest Correll	Hillcrest	-
1939	Epworth Orphanage	Ernest Correll	Cilo	-
1940	Hillcrest	-	Thornwell Orphanage	-
1941	Thornwell	-	Pinewood	-
1942	No Results			
1943	No Results			
1944	St. Paul's	-	Gable	-
1945	Monetta	George W. Sawyer	-	-
1946	St. Stephen	Charles F. Keence	McCormick	W.H. Bill Weldon
1947	Blackville	-	Dentsville	E.L. Wright
1948	McCormick	W.H. Bill Weldon	Gable	-
1949	Central	Fleming D. Thornton	Olar	-
1950	Heath Springs	-	Macedonia	-
1951	Central	Fleming D. Thornton	North	Jud Davis
1952	Central	Fleming D. Thornton	St. John's	Bob Stutts
1953	St. John's	-	Heath Springs	-
1954	Norway	-	Thornwell	-
1955	St. John's	-	Thornwell	-
1956	Elloree	-	Heath Springs	-
1957	Springfield	Earl Bethea	Heath Springs	-
1958	St. John's	-	Jackson	-
1959	Furman	Hugh Betchman	Thornwell	D.S. Templeton
1960	Elloree	Joseph D. Parker	Bethune	Clifton Price
1961	Cameron	R.E. Hussey	St. Stephen	Leon Maxwell
1962	St. Stephen	Leon Maxwell	Norway	Byron L. King
1963	Norway	Byron L. King	Jefferson	John L. Byrd
1964	Norway	Byron L. King	St. Stephen	Leon Maxwell
1965	Elloree	Joseph D. Parker	Heath Springs	Sidney Cauthen
1966	Elloree	Joseph D. Parker	Heath Springs	Sidney Cauthen
1967	Heath Springs	Sidney Cauthen	St. Stephen	Leon Maxwell

=== Pre 1932 ===
Year	Champion	Champion Coach	Score	Runner-up	Runner-up Coach
1916	Florence	H.H. Painter	33-14	Chester	-
1917	Florence	Hoyt Wilson	40-0	Winnsboro	-
1918	Florence	W.L. Booker	No Title Game		
1919	Florence	R.E. Browne Jr	No Title Game		
1920	Charleston	Carl Prause	No Title Game		
1921	Charleston	Carl Prause	34-0	Chester	William K. Magill
1922	Charleston	Carl Prause	48-0	Gaffney	L.F. Carson
1923	Thornwell	Lonnie McMillian	28-7	Columbia	Henry Lightsey
1924	Columbia	Henry Lightsey	36-0	Gaffney	L.F. Carson
1925	Columbia	Henry Lightsey	24-0	Gaffney	L.F. Carson
1926	Columbia	-	25-14	Gaffney	L.F. Carson
1927	Gaffney	Herman Smith	8-0	Columbia	-
1928	Gaffney	Herman Smith	20-14	Columbia	-
1929	Gaffney	L.F. Carson	20-14	Columbia	-
1930	Columbia	-	-	-	-
1931	Gaffney/Orangeburg (Co-Champions)	L.F. Carson/-	-	-	

=== Most State Championships ===
Team	Titles	Years Won
Gaffney	18	1927, 1928, 1929, 1931, 1934, 1960, 1961, 1963, 1964, 1965, 1985, 1992, 1997, 2003, 2005, 2006, 2012, 2021
Abbeville	13	1971, 1981, 1991, 1996, 2010, 2011, 2015, 2016, 2017, 2018, 2020, 2022, 2024
Summerville	12	1948, 1949, 1955, 1956, 1969, 1978, 1979, 1982, 1983, 1984, 1986, 1998
Byrnes	11	1976, 1982, 1986, 2002, 2003, 2004, 2005, 2007, 2008, 2010, 2011
Woodruff	10	1956, 1957, 1965, 1975, 1976, 1977, 1978, 1980, 1983, 1984
Lake View	9	1938, 1961, 1970, 1971, 1981, 1989, 1991, 1997, 2006
Dutch Fork	10	2013, 2016, 2017, 2018, 2019, 2020, 2022, 2023, 2024, 2025
Clinton	9	1939, 1972, 1975, 1977, 1978, 1985, 1987, 2009, 2024
Blackville-Hilda	8	1947, 1970, 1983, 1984, 1988, 1995, 2005, 2007
Columbia	8	1924, 1925, 1926, 1930, 1933, 1938, 1939, 1943
Greenwood	8	1947, 1948, 1961, 1968, 1976, 1999, 2000, 2006
Daniel	8	1966, 1991, 1992, 1995, 1998, 2020, 2021, 2023
Batesburg-Leesville	7	1927, 1928, 1979, 1995, 1999, 2005, 2013
Camden	7	1931, 1936, 1944, 1957, 1964, 1990, 2001
Spartanburg	7	1932, 1991, 1994, 1995, 1996, 2001, 2014
Myrtle Beach	7	1980, 1981, 1983, 1984, 2008, 2010, 2018
Chester	7	1929, 1930, 1932, 1935, 1936, 1963, 2018
