= Philip Simmons High School =

High school in South Carolina, United States

Coordinates: 32.91728°N 79.85068°W

Location
- 3080 River Village Drive; Charleston, (Berkeley County), South Carolina 29492; United States

Information
- Type: Public high school
- Principal: Chris Buchholz
- Staff: 55.40 (FTE)
- Enrollment: 809 (2023-2024)
- Student to teacher ratio: 14.60
- Colors: Purple, black and gray
- Nickname: Iron Horses
- Website: https://www.bcsdschools.net/o/psh

Philip Simmons High School is a high school in Charleston, South Carolina, United States. It is part of the Berkeley County School District, and is named after Philip Simmons.

Opened in 2017, it serves Daniel Island, an area of Charleston; Thomas Island; Huger, and the Cainhoy Peninsula. These areas were previously zoned to Hanahan High School or Timberland High School (South Carolina) .

Its campus has 107 acres (43 ha) of land, and the school building will have 219,000 square feet (20,300 m^{2}) of space.

Chris Buchholz is the principal.

== History ==
The school officially opened on August 17, 2017. Dr. James A. Spencer was the first principal, and Brion Packett was the first assistant principal for athletics. Prior to his appointment, Spencer was the principal of Marrington Middle School of the Arts.

== Feeder patterns ==
Its feeder schools are Daniel Island K-8, Cainhoy Elementary, Philip Simmons Elementary, and Philip Simmons Middle.
