= Philip Simmons =

American blacksmith

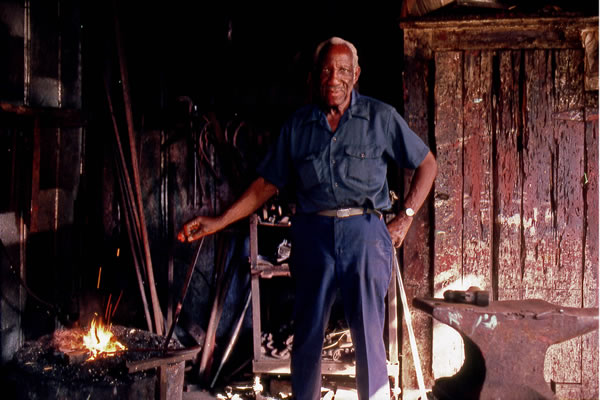
- Simmons in 1982
- Born: June 9, 1912; Daniel Island, South Carolina, U.S.
- Died: June 22, 2009 (aged 97); Charleston, South Carolina
- Occupations: Artisan, ironworker

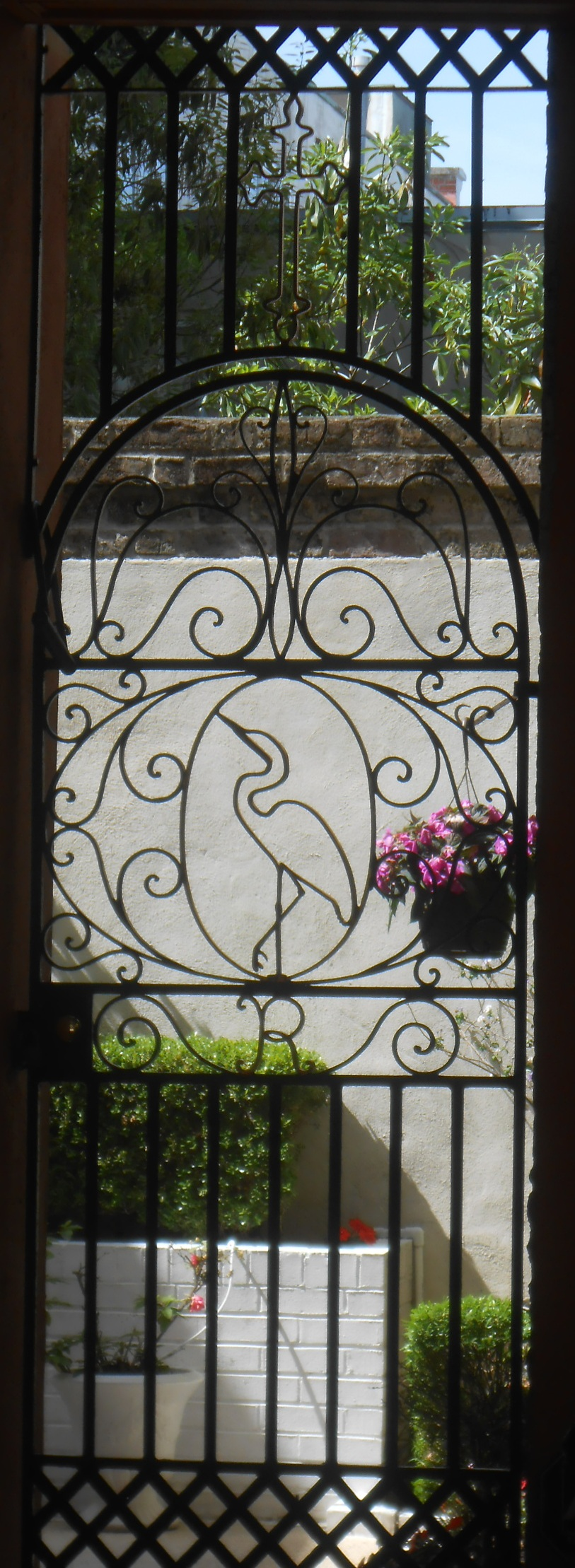
One of Simmons' most photographed works is the Egret Gate at 2 St. Michael's Alley in Charleston, South Carolina.

Philip Simmons (June 9, 1912 – June 22, 2009) was an American artisan and blacksmith specializing in the craft of ironwork. Simmons spent 78 years as a blacksmith, focusing on decorative iron work. When he began his career, blacksmiths in Charleston made practical, everyday household objects, such as horseshoes. By the time he retired 77 years later, the craft was considered an art form rather than a practical profession.

Examples of Simmons' work, including iron gates, can be seen throughout the city of Charleston, South Carolina, as well as the rest of South Carolina Lowcountry. His pieces are displayed at the Smithsonian Museum, South Carolina State Museum, Paris, France, and China.

== Biography ==
Philip Simmons was born on June 9, 1912, in Daniel Island, South Carolina. He was raised by his grandparents, before being sent to Charleston in 1920 to live with his mother when he was 8 years old. Simmons resided on Vernon Street and enrolled in school at the Buist Elementary School, which is now known as the Buist Academy. Later in his life, Simmons would design and create the iron arch which now stands over the school's entry gate.

Simmons became interested in the craftspeople who lived in his neighborhood, and soon began visiting various workshops near his home. In particular, Simmons became interested in a smithy on Charlotte Street run by Peter Simmons, who was not related to Philip. Philip Simmons soon quit school and began an apprenticeship with Peter Simmons, a former slave, when he was 13 years old. He became a full blacksmith when he was 18 years old, after a five-year apprenticeship.

Simmons began working with ornamental and decorative ironwork in 1938 at his own blacksmith shop.

In the early 1940s, Simmons began working with a Charleston businessman named Jack Krawcheck. Krawcheck commissioned a wrought iron gate for the rear of his store, which was located on King Street. However, Simmons had to create the gate out of scrap iron because the demand for iron during World War II made it impossible to acquire new iron. This was the first iron gate that Simmons ever crafted and delivered to a customer. The Krawcheck family would ultimately acquire more than 30 iron pieces from Simmons during his career.

Though he had begun working on ornamental ironwork in 1938, the Krawcheck gate marked a turning point in Simmons' career as an iron artisan. Over the course of his seven decades long career, Simmons created over 500 separate pieces, including iron balconies, window grilles, fences and gates. For example, Simmons forged and designed five iron gates along Stolls Alley in Charleston alone. In 1976, he created a "star and fish gate" for the Smithsonian Institution, which was designed to look like the fish was swimming.

Simmons also created smaller, metal objects to supplement his income, including tools, shutter dog and fireplace pokers. In 1970, Simmons created a cup holder for a Volvo, which was crafted from a coat hanger.

Most of his work was created at his workshop at his home on Blake Street.

=== Recognition ===
John Michael Vlach, an author and professor of American studies at George Washington University, penned a biography of Simmons and his work in a 1981 book entitled Charleston Blacksmith: The Work of Philips Simmons. The book was re-released as a second, updated edition eleven years later. In a separate essay called, "The Buildings of Charleston," Vlach later wrote of Simmons' career, "At the outset of his career he took orders; now he gives them...In the midst of his time-bound trade and even while preserving the historic appearance of Charleston, he remains his own man. He has found self-expression in the communal tradition."

The National Endowment for the Arts bestowed Simmons with a National Heritage Fellowship in 1982. During his acceptance speech at the ceremony, which Simmons gave following a performance by a blues group, Simmons remarked, "My instrument is an anvil. I guess some of you have heard me play ... a tune on the anvil, the old blacksmith tune. ... I'm proud of that anvil, really proud. ... That anvil fed me when I was hungry and that anvil clothed me when I was naked. That anvil put shoes on my feet."

Although he officially retired at age 75, Simmons continued to teach his craft to younger artisans late into his life. In 1991, the Vestry of his church, St. John's Reformed Episcopal Church, formed the Philip Simmons Foundation, a nonprofit 501(c)(3) organization to develop and maintain a commemorative garden on the grounds of the church as a tribute to the man and his work. The church and garden is located at 91 Anson Street in downtown Charleston, South Carolina. In 2004, a gate designed by Simmons and executed by artisans he taught received a commemorative plaque from the General Services Administration's Art in Architecture Program.

A documentary on Simmon's life titled Keeper of The Gate won the 1995 Southeastern Regional Emmy Award in the category of Cultural Documentary. It was written and directed by David Flander. Simmons and Flander struck a friendship during filming and remained friends. They would go to local Charleston sporting events together.

In 2006, Simmons received an honorary doctorate from South Carolina State University for his contributions to the field of metalworking.

== Later life ==
Simmons moved from his home to the Bishop Gadsden Retirement Community in Charleston in the spring of 2008. He died there on June 22, 2009, at 9 P.M. at the age of 97.

== Awards and honors ==
Simmons was a recipient of a 1982 National Heritage Fellowship awarded by the National Endowment for the Arts, which is the United States government's highest honor in the folk and traditional arts. That year's fellowships were the first bestowed by the NEA. On January 31, 1994, he was inducted into the South Carolina Hall of Fame.

South Carolina Governor David Beasley bestowed the Order of the Palmetto, the state's highest honor, on Simmons in 1998. He was later awarded the Elizabeth O'Neill Verner Governor's Award for "Lifetime Achievement in the Arts" in May 2001. He was also honored by the South Carolina Legislature for his work.

Berkeley County School District honored Simmons by naming three public schools located on Daniel Island, his birthplace, after the artist and educator. These include Philip Simmons Elementary, Philip Simmons Middle and Philip Simmons High. All three schools incorporate design elements reminiscent of his work, and murals of his likeness. The sports teams of all three schools are named the Iron Horses in his honor.

=== List of awards ===
- 1982, National Endowment for the Arts, National Heritage Fellowship
- 1982, Lifetime Achievement Award, South Carolina General Assembly for "lifetime achievement" and commissions for public sculptures by the South Carolina State Museum and the city of Charleston
- 1994, South Carolina Hall of Fame, Myrtle Beach, South Carolina
- 1998, Order of the Palmetto, the highest civilian award given in South Carolina, by Governor David Beasley
- 2001, Elizabeth O'Neill Verner Governor's Award for "Lifetime Achievement in the Arts"
