= Curtis Campbell =

Curtis Campbell may refer to:

- Curtis Campbell (writer)
- Curtis Campbell (executive)
