= Javon Kinlaw =

Trinidadian American football player (born 1997)

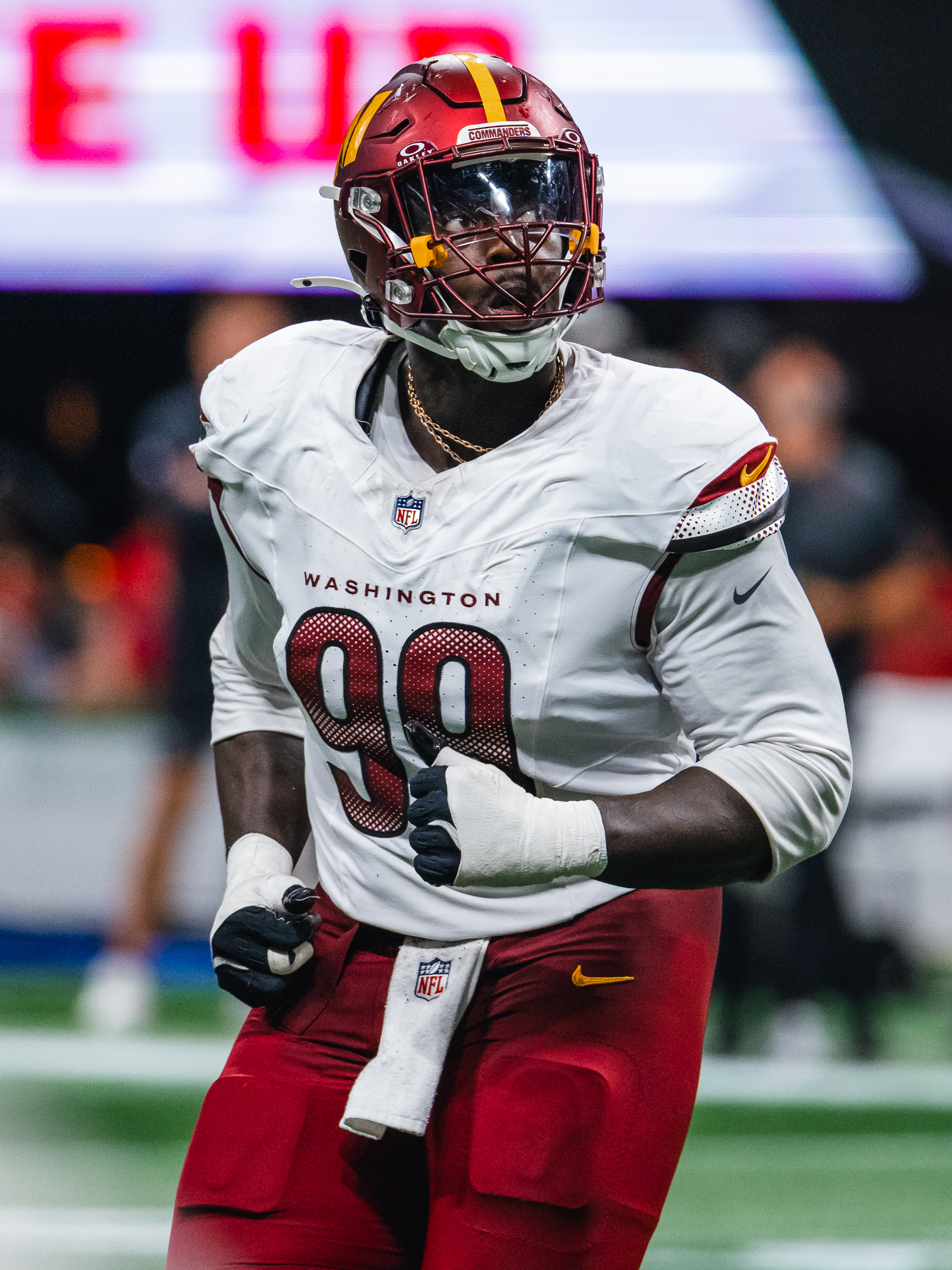
- Kinlaw with the Washington Commanders in 2025

No. 99 – Washington Commanders
- Position: Defensive tackle
- Roster status: Injured reserve

Personal information
- Born: 3 October 1997 (age 29); Port of Spain, Trinidad
- Listed height: 6 ft 5 in (1.96 m)
- Listed weight: 319 lb (145 kg)

Career information
- High school: Goose Creek (Goose Creek, South Carolina, U.S.)
- College: Jones County (2016); South Carolina (2017–2019)
- NFL draft: 2020: 1st round, 14th overall pick

Career history
- San Francisco 49ers (2020–2023); New York Jets (2024); Washington Commanders (2025–present)

Awards and highlights
- PFWA All-Rookie Team (2020); First-team All-American (2019)

Career NFL statistics as of Week 5, 2026
- Tackles: 164
- Sacks: 10.5
- Forced fumbles: 3
- Fumble recoveries: 1
- Pass deflections: 9
- Interceptions: 1
- Touchdowns: 1
- Stats at Pro Football Reference

Javon Kinlaw (born 3 October 1997) is a Trinidadian American professional football defensive tackle for the Washington Commanders of the National Football League (NFL). He played college football for the Jones County Bobcats and South Carolina Gamecocks and was selected by the San Francisco 49ers in the first round of the 2020 NFL draft. Kinlaw has also played for the New York Jets.

== Early life ==
Kinlaw spent part of his childhood homeless in Washington, D.C. after immigrating from Trinidad and Tobago with his mother and two siblings. He attended Goose Creek High School in Goose Creek, South Carolina.

== College career ==
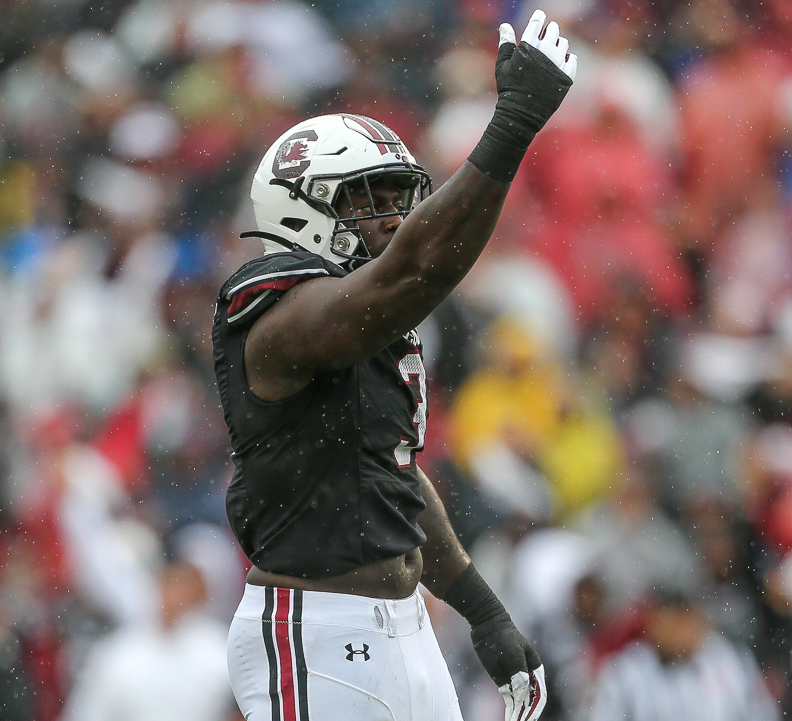
Kinlaw with the South Carolina Gamecocks in 2019

Kinlaw played his freshman season for the Jones County Bobcats in Ellisville, Mississippi, before transferring to the University of South Carolina in 2017. In his first year at South Carolina in 2017, he played in all 13 games with 10 starts and had 20 tackles. In 2018, he started all 12 games and had 38 tackles and 4.5 sacks. Kinlaw returned to South Carolina for his senior season in 2019.

== Professional career ==
Pre-draft measurables
Height	Weight	Arm length	Hand span	Wingspan
6 ft 5 1/8 in (1.96 m)	324 lb (147 kg)	34 7/8 in (0.89 m)	10 1/2 in (0.27 m)	6 ft 11 3/4 in (2.13 m)
All values from NFL Combine

=== San Francisco 49ers ===
Kinlaw was selected by the San Francisco 49ers in the first round (14th overall) of the 2020 NFL draft. The 14th overall pick was acquired originally from the Tampa Bay Buccaneers after the 49ers traded down with the first round pick (13th overall) they originally acquired in the DeForest Buckner trade. He signed his four-year rookie contract with the team on 26 June 2020, worth a fully guaranteed $15.48 million, including an $8.8 million signing bonus.

During Week 10 against the New Orleans Saints, Kinlaw recorded his first career sack on quarterback Taysom Hill during the 27–13 loss. Kinlaw was placed on the reserve/COVID-19 list by the team on 18 November 2020, and activated on 27 November. In Week 12 against the Los Angeles Rams, Kinlaw intercepted a pass thrown by Jared Goff and returned it for a 27-yard touchdown during the 23–20 win. This was his first career interception and touchdown. Kinlaw was named Pepsi Rookie of the Week for his performance against the Rams. As a rookie, Kinlaw appeared in 14 games and started 12. He recorded 1.5 sacks, 33 total tackles, one interception, and four passes defended. He was named to the PFWA All-Rookie Team.

On 30 October 2021, Kinlaw was placed on injured reserve. He played in four games on the 2021 season.

On 15 October 2022, Kinlaw was placed on injured reserve. He was activated on 23 December. He started in all six of his regular season appearances and the 49ers' three postseason games.

On 29 April 2023, the 49ers declined the fifth-year option of Kinlaw's rookie contract, making him a free agent in the 2024 offseason. In the 2023 season, Kinlaw appeared in all 17 games and started six. He finished with 3.5 sacks, 25 total tackles, and three passes defended.

=== New York Jets ===
On March 14, 2024, Kinlaw signed a one-year contract with the New York Jets. He started in all 17 games. He finished with 4.5 sacks, 40 total tackles (27 solo), two forced fumbles, and one fumble recovery.

=== Washington Commanders ===
On March 14, 2025, Kinlaw signed a three-year contract with the Washington Commanders, worth a maximum of $45 million with $30 million guaranteed. In Week 16 of the 2025 season, he was ejected for throwing a punch after a brawl broke out between the Washington defense and Philadelphia offense in the fourth quarter. In the 2025 season, he started all 17 games. He finished with 43 total tackles (24 solo).

On November 3, 2026, Kinlaw was placed on injured reserve due to a knee injury he suffered in the Week 6 game. The next day it was confirmed he would miss the remainder of the 2026 season after receiving surgery to repair his MCL.

== Career statistics ==
Legend
**Bold**	Career high

=== NFL ===
==== Regular season ====
Year	Team	Games		Tackles					Fumbles				Interceptions					
Year	Team	GP	GS	Comb	Solo	Ast	Sacks	TFL	FF	FR	Yds	TD	Int	Yds	Avg	Lng	TD	PD
2020	SF	14	12	33	15	18	1.5	3	0	0	0	0	**1**	**27**	**27.0**	**27**	**1**	**4**
2021	SF	4	4	8	1	7	0.0	0	0	0	0	0	0	0	0.0	0	0	0
2022	SF	6	6	4	2	2	0.0	0	0	0	0	0	0	0	0.0	0	0	0
2023	SF	17	6	25	13	12	3.5	4	0	0	0	0	0	0	0.0	0	0	3
2024	NYJ	17	17	40	**27**	13	**4.5**	**5**	**2**	**1**	**4**	0	0	0	0.0	0	0	0
2025	WAS	17	17	**43**	24	**19**	0.0	**5**	1	0	0	0	0	0	0.0	0	0	0
2026	WAS	5	5	11	6	5	1.0	2	0	0	0	0	0	0	0.0	0	0	2
Career		80	67	164	88	76	10.5	19	3	1	4	0	1	27	27.0	27T	1	9

==== Postseason ====
Year	Team	Games		Tackles					Fumbles				Interceptions					
Year	Team	GP	GS	Comb	Solo	Ast	Sacks	TFL	FF	FR	Yds	TD	Int	Yds	Avg	Lng	TD	PD
2022	SF	3	3	5	2	**3**	0.0	1	0	0	0	0	0	0	0.0	0	0	0
2023	SF	3	0	**9**	**7**	2	0.0	**2**	0	0	0	0	0	0	0.0	0	0	0
Career		6	3	14	9	5	0.0	3	0	0	0	0	0	0	0.0	0	0	0

=== College ===
College statistics
Year	Team	GP	Tackles					Interceptions		Fumbles	
Year	Team	GP	Solo	Ast	Tot	Loss	Sk	Int	PD	FF	FR
2017	South Carolina	7	12	5	17	2.0	0.0	0	1	1	**2**
2018	South Carolina	10	**15**	15	30	**9.0**	4.0	0	**5**	**2**	0
2019	South Carolina	12	**15**	**20**	**35**	6.0	**6.0**	0	2	0	**2**
Career		29	42	40	82	17.0	10.0	0	8	3	4
