= Timberland High School =

Timberland High School may refer to:

- Timberland High School (Missouri) - Wentzville, Missouri (St. Louis area)
- Timberland High School (South Carolina) - St. Stephen, South Carolina
