= John Bickley House =

Coordinates: 32.786081°N 79.942706°W

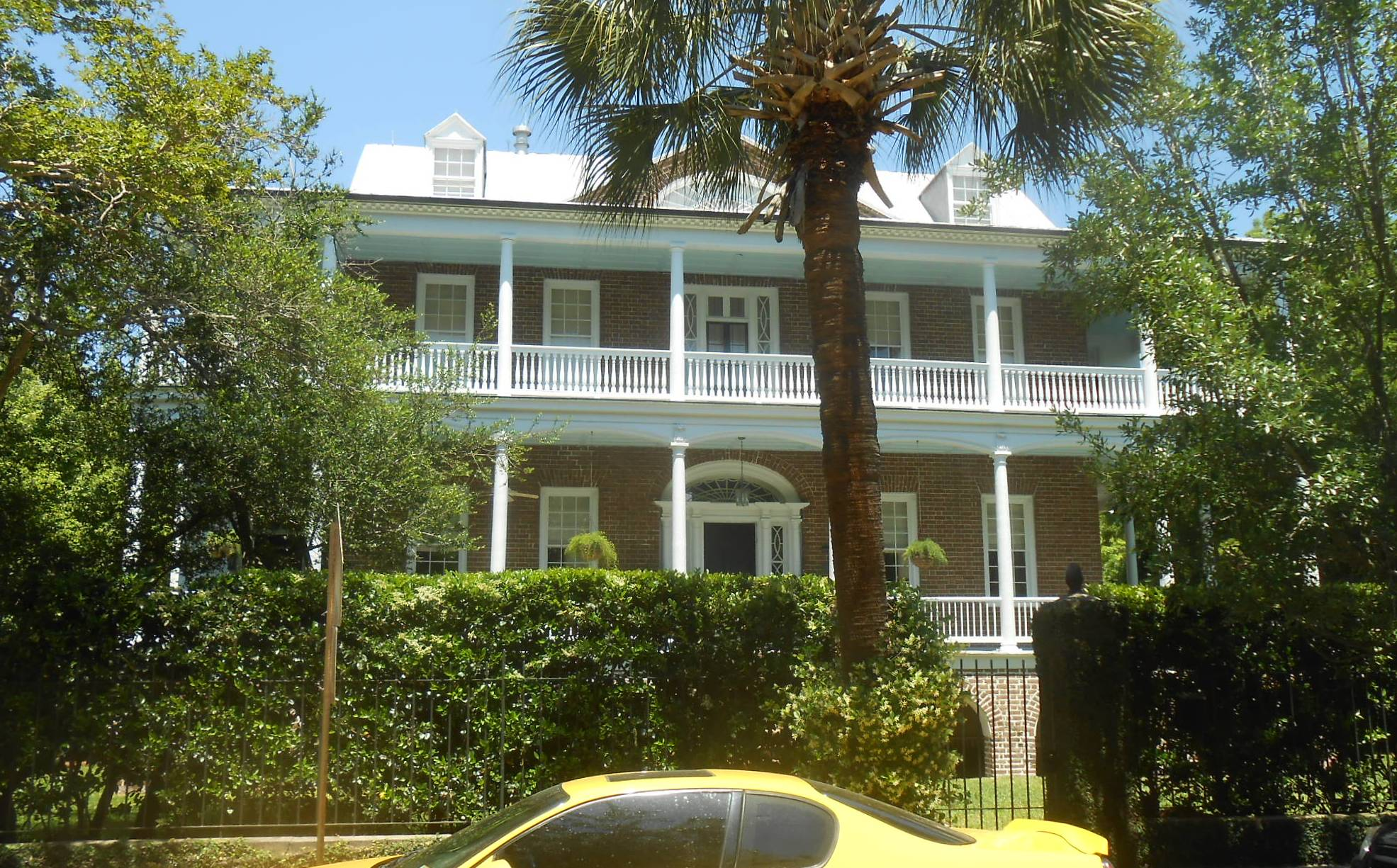
The John Bickley House, 64 Vanderhorst St., Charleston, South Carolina

The John Bickley House is an early 19th-century house at 64 Vanderhorst St., Charleston, South Carolina. The construction date for the house has been the subject of debate for many years, but the current consensus places the date as after 1824. John Bickley bought the property upon which the house stands in 1824 for $707.94, and in 1826, the house was placed in a trust for his wife, Mary Desel. The low price for the large lot (even by the standards of that period) and the transfer to the trust suggest that the house was built for Bickley. Bickley was a lumber factor who also planted rice at Woodstock Plantation in Goose Creek, South Carolina. The two-and-a-half-story Flemish bond, brick house sits on a high basement with a two-story piazza along the south facade that wraps to each side. In both interior and exterior details, the house reflects the Regency style.

Former South Carolina Gamecock football equipment manager, Peter Zervos, grew up in this house.

As of 2025, it remains privately owned.
