= Tracy White =

American football player (born 1981)

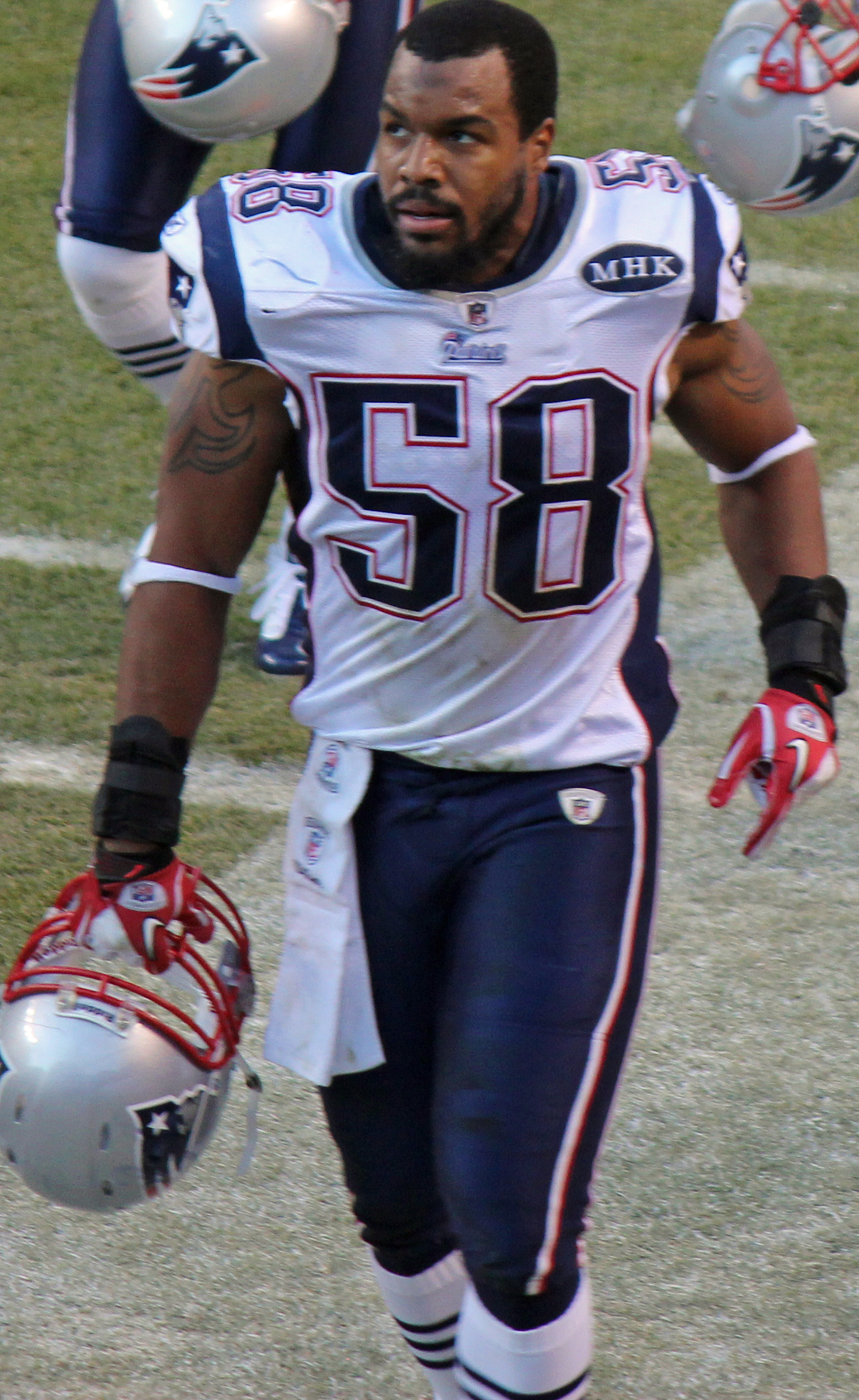
- White in 2011

No. 59, 54, 58
- Position: Linebacker

Personal information
- Born: April 14, 1981 (age 45); Charleston, South Carolina, U.S.
- Listed height: 6 ft 0 in (1.83 m)
- Listed weight: 234 lb (106 kg)

Career information
- High school: Timberland (St. Stephen, South Carolina)
- College: Howard
- NFL draft: 2003: undrafted

Career history
- Seattle Seahawks (2003−2004); Jacksonville Jaguars (2005); Green Bay Packers (2006−2008); Philadelphia Eagles (2008−2009); New England Patriots (2010−2012)

Awards and highlights
- 3× All-MEAC (2000–2002); 2× MEAC Defensive Player of the Year (2001, 2002)

Career NFL statistics
- Total tackles: 187
- Sacks: 1
- Fumble recoveries: 3
- Interceptions: 1
- Defensive touchdowns: 1
- Stats at Pro Football Reference

Tracy Donnel White (born April 14, 1981) is an American former professional football player who was a linebacker in the National Football League (NFL). He played college football for the Howard Bison. White was signed by the Seattle Seahawks as an undrafted free agent in 2003.

White was also a member of the Jacksonville Jaguars, Green Bay Packers, Philadelphia Eagles, and New England Patriots.

== Early life ==
White was born in Charleston, South Carolina. He attended Timberland High School in St. Stephen, South Carolina, and played linebacker and kicker on his high school football team. He also participated in wrestling and track and field.

== College career ==
White started all 44 games played at Howard University and led the team each season in tackles, becoming the school's all-time leader with 500, to go along with 22 sacks and six interceptions. As a junior, he was named the Black College Defensive Player of the Year. He was twice named Mid-Eastern Athletic Conference Defensive Player of the Year and was a three-time All-MEAC selection. Following the 2002 season, White played in the East–West Shrine Game, the only Division I-AA player to participate that year. While at Howard University, White became a member of Phi Beta Sigma fraternity.

== Professional career ==
Pre-draft measurables
Height	Weight	Arm length	Hand span	40-yard dash	Vertical jump
5 ft 11 in (1.80 m)	228 lb (103 kg)	32 in (0.81 m)	9 7/8 in (0.25 m)	4.54 s	31 in (0.79 m)
Measurables were taken at Pro Day.

=== Seattle Seahawks ===
After being undrafted in the 2003 NFL draft, White signed with the Seattle Seahawks on May 1, 2003. After spending two seasons with the Seahawks, in which he saw mostly special teams work, he was waived on September 3, 2005.

=== Jacksonville Jaguars ===
White was immediately claimed off waivers by the Jacksonville Jaguars. He played in 15 games, again mostly on special teams. On December 28, before the season finale, he was placed on the injured reserve list with an ankle injury. The Jaguars did not offer him a contract for the next season, making him a free agent.

=== Green Bay Packers ===
White signed with the Green Bay Packers on March 17, 2006. On March 16, 2008, White re-signed with the Packers to a two-year contract after visits with the Denver Broncos and Pittsburgh Steelers. The contract was worth $1.8 million and the deal included a $250,000 signing bonus.

White became an unrestricted free agent after the 2007 season but was re-signed by the Packers on March 25, 2008. He was released by the Packers on October 7 after practice squad linebacker Danny Lansanah was promoted to the active roster.

=== Philadelphia Eagles ===
On October 14, 2008, the Philadelphia Eagles signed White to a two-year contract. He was primarily used as a special-teams player. He re-signed with the Eagles on July 31, 2010, to a one-year contract.

=== New England Patriots ===
On September 4, 2010, the Eagles traded White to the New England Patriots for an undisclosed late round pick in the 2012 NFL draft. Playing in 16 games, all as a reserve, White finished second on the team with 18 special teams tackles.

At the end of the 2011 season, White and the Patriots appeared in Super Bowl XLVI. He started in the game, but the Patriots lost to the New York Giants by a score of 21–17.

After his time with the Patriots, White did not sign with another NFL team and eventually retired from professional football.
