= Daniel Island =

Island in South Carolina, US

Coordinates: 32.8591°N 79.9120°W

Daniel Island, South Carolina is a 4,000-acre (16 km^{2}) body of land located in the city of Charleston, South Carolina, United States. Named after its former inhabitant, the colonial governor of the Carolinas, Robert Daniell, the island is located in Berkeley County and situated between the Cooper and Wando Rivers. As of July 2012 it is being developed as a master-planned community complete with residential neighborhoods, parks, trails, recreational amenities and a downtown that is home to shops, restaurants, schools, churches and offices for businesses. Daniel Island is an island, bordered to the west by the Cooper River, the east by the Wando River, and the north by the connected Nowell and Beresford Creeks.

== History ==
Daniel Island was initially inhabited by the Ittiwan people, a native tribe also commonly referred to as the Etiwan. In 1947, the land was purchased by the Harry Frank Guggenheim Foundation and used primarily for farming, cattle ranching, and as a private hunting retreat, the island remained undeveloped until the early 1990s when the newly constructed I-526 expressway was completed. At that time, the Guggenheim Foundation sponsored the development of a master plan that would guide the island’s development as a natural extension of this affluent suburb of Charleston. Development of the first residential properties began in 1996, and in 1997 the island was purchased by the Daniel Island Company, a developer of master-planned communities. Hundreds of acres of parks have since been created.

== City planning and facilities ==
One professional sports facility - the Credit One Stadium – is located on the island, along with a private country club, the Daniel Island Club, with golf courses by Tom Fazio and Rees Jones. The club hosted the Nationwide Tour Championship, the final event of the Nationwide Tour from 2009-2011. There are also three churches and three schools on the island. The community and its developers have been nationally recognized for responsible planning and "smart growth" practices with numerous awards and accolades. It was a 2007 recipient of an "Award for Excellence" from the Urban Land Institute.

Daniel Island is home to eight main parks, with each neighborhood on the island having its own park. The eight parks are Barfield Park, Center Park, Cochran Park, Codner's Ferry Park, Daniel Island Park, Etiwan Park, Pierce Park and Smythe Park. Daniel Island also has a downtown area where many businesses, restaurants, doctors' offices, shops and condominiums are located.

== Education ==
There are three schools located on Daniel Island: the DI Academy (pre-K), Daniel Island School (K–8) and Bishop England High School (9–12), a private Roman Catholic high school that has an estimated student body of 700 students.

The Daniel Island School, a part of the Berkeley County School District, was constructed in 2006. The building, with a capacity of 1,200 students serves Daniel Island and Thomas Island. In 2016 the school was overcrowded, with over 1,400 students, but it was relieved in 2016 by the opening of Philip Simmons Elementary and Middle School, which began to serve the Cainhoy Peninsula, previously served by Daniel Island School. Residents in Daniel Island were initially zoned to Hanahan High School in Hanahan but in 2017, Daniel Island was rezoned to Philip Simmons High School. The community was previously zoned to Hanahan Elementary School and Hanahan Middle School.

Daniel Island has a public library, a branch of the Berkeley County Library System.

Church of the Holy Spirit on Daniel Island hosts two educational programs as well: a pre-school called Holy Spirit Island School which teaches age one through four, and Daniel Island Music Academy, a music lessons school specializing in private lessons for ages six and up.

== Sports ==
Daniel Island was home to the Charleston Battery. They played in the MUSC Health Stadium located on Daniel Island Drive. The Volvo Car Open, a professional tennis tournament, is played at the Family Circle Tennis Center. The tournament is also known as the Charleston Open.

== Notable residents ==
- Nancy Mace
- Frank Abagnale
