= Brandon Shell =

American football player (born 1992)

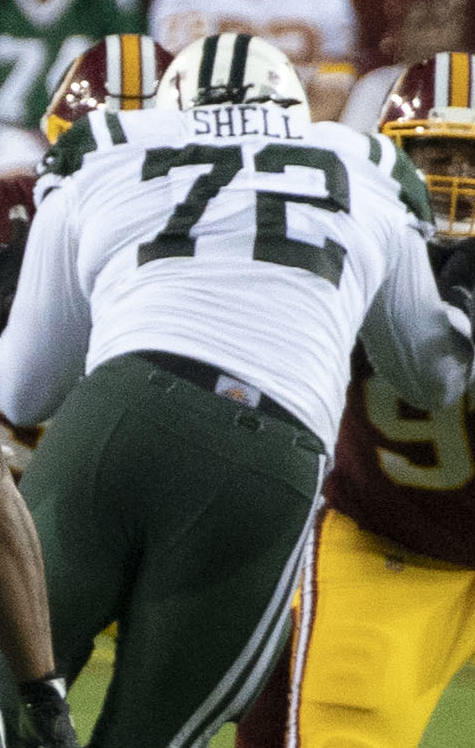
- Shell with the New York Jets in 2018

No. 72, 71, 68
- Position: Offensive tackle

Personal information
- Born: February 6, 1992 (age 34); Goose Creek, South Carolina, U.S.
- Listed height: 6 ft 5 in (1.96 m)
- Listed weight: 324 lb (147 kg)

Career information
- High school: Goose Creek
- College: South Carolina (2011–2015)
- NFL draft: 2016: 5th round, 158th overall pick

Career history
- New York Jets (2016–2019); Seattle Seahawks (2020–2021); Miami Dolphins (2022); Buffalo Bills (2023)*
- * Offseason or practice squad member only

Career NFL statistics
- Games played: 70
- Games started: 61
- Stats at Pro Football Reference

Brandon McArthur Shell (born February 6, 1992) is an American former professional football player who was an offensive tackle for seven seasons in the National Football League (NFL). He played college football for the South Carolina Gamecocks. He is the great nephew of Pro Football Hall of Fame tackle Art Shell.

== Early life ==
A native of Goose Creek, South Carolina, Shell attended West Ashley high school for his freshman year later transferring to Goose Creek High School, where he was an All-American offensive lineman. Regarded as a four-star recruit by Rivals.com, Shell was ranked as the fourth best offensive tackle in his class.

== College career ==
Shell attended the University of South Carolina, where he played college football. He made 47 consecutive starts for the Gamecocks. As a redshirt senior in 2015, Shell earned the start at left tackle for every game. In 2014 and 2013, Shell played every game at right tackle. In 2012 as a redshirt freshman, Shell started at left tackle before transitioning to right side. For the 2012 season he started 10 out of 13 games and earned Freshman All-Southeastern Conference honors and was named first-team Freshman All-American by FoxSportsNext.com.

Shell was invited to play in the East–West Shrine Game following his senior season.

== Professional career ==
=== Pre-draft ===
Coming out of college, Shell was projected by many analysts to be either a sixth or seventh round selection. He was ranked the 20th best offensive tackle out of the 108 available by NFLDraftScout.com.

Pre-draft measurables
Height	Weight	Arm length	Hand span	40-yard dash	10-yard split	20-yard split	20-yard shuttle	Three-cone drill	Vertical jump	Broad jump	Bench press
6 ft 5 3/8 in (1.97 m)	324 lb (147 kg)	34 3/4 in (0.88 m)	10 3/4 in (0.27 m)	5.22 s	1.75 s	2.92 s	4.62 s	7.62 s	30 1/2 in (0.77 m)	9 ft 4 in (2.84 m)	22 reps
All values from NFL Combine and South Carolina Pro Day

=== New York Jets ===
Shell was selected in the fifth round with the 158th overall pick by the New York Jets in the 2016 NFL draft. On May 7, 2016, the Jets signed Shell to a four-year, $2.91 million rookie contract with a signing bonus of $551,133.

Shell became a starter for the Jets in 2017, starting 12 games at right tackle, missing four games due to shoulder and neck injuries and a concussion.

In 2018, Shell started the first 14 games at right tackle before suffering a knee injury in Week 15. He was placed on injured reserve on December 19, 2018.

=== Seattle Seahawks ===
On March 24, 2020, Shell signed a two-year, $11 million contract with the Seattle Seahawks. He was placed on the reserve/COVID-19 list by the team on January 2, 2021, and activated three days later.

In the 2021 season, Shell started 10 games for the Seahawks before being placed on injured reserve with a shoulder injury.

=== Miami Dolphins ===
On September 19, 2022, Shell signed with the practice squad of the Miami Dolphins. He was elevated for Week 6 and started at right tackle. He was signed to the active roster on October 22.

=== Buffalo Bills ===
On June 1, 2023, Shell signed with the Buffalo Bills. He announced his retirement from the NFL on August 15, 2023.
