= Marcus Howard =

American football player (born 1985)

No. 92
- Position: Defensive end

Personal information
- Born: October 10, 1985 (age 41); Huger, South Carolina, U.S.
- Listed height: 6 ft 1 in (1.85 m)
- Listed weight: 245 lb (111 kg)

Career information
- High school: Hanahan
- College: Georgia
- NFL draft: 2008: 5th round, 161st overall pick

Career history
- 2008: Indianapolis Colts
- 2010: Tennessee Titans
- 2011–2017: Edmonton Eskimos

Awards and highlights
- Grey Cup champion (2015); CFL West All-Star (2011); 2008 Sugar Bowl MVP

Career NFL statistics
- Games played: 9
- Total tackles: 14
- Sacks: 1.5
- Forced fumbles: 1
- Stats at Pro Football Reference
- Stats at CFL.ca

Marcus Howard (born October 10, 1985) is an American former professional football player who was a defensive end in the National Football League (NFL) and Canadian Football League (CFL). He was selected by the Indianapolis Colts in the fifth round of the 2008 NFL draft. He played college football for the Georgia Bulldogs.

Howard was also a member of the Tennessee Titans and Edmonton Eskimos.

== Early life ==
Howard played high school football at Hanahan High School in Hanahan, South Carolina. While there he played running back and linebacker and was a three-time all-region and two-time class 2-A all-state choice. As a senior, he was the class 2-A Defensive Player of the Year. He also played basketball and ran track.

== College career ==
Howard played college football at Georgia. He played both defensive end and linebacker. During his senior year, he started all 13 games and achieved First-team All-SEC honors after recording 41 tackles, 10.5 sacks, and three forced fumbles. He finished his career with 79 tackles, 12 sacks, and four forced fumbles. He won the 2008 Sugar Bowl MVP after he posted 3.5 sacks, one forced fumble which he recovered in the end zone for a touchdown, and a deflected pass which was intercepted by teammate Dannell Ellerbe.

== Professional career ==
=== Indianapolis Colts ===
Howard was selected by the Indianapolis Colts in the fifth round of the 2008 NFL draft with the 161st overall pick. He was waived on September 5, 2009.

=== Tennessee Titans ===
Howard signed a future contract with the Tennessee Titans on January 13, 2010. He was waived on August 12. He was later re-signed, only to be released again on July 28, 2011.

=== Edmonton Eskimos ===
On August 1, 2011, Howard signed a contract with the Edmonton Eskimos of the Canadian Football League (CFL). He played for the Eskimos from 2011 to 2017. He was named a CFL West All-Star in 2011.
