= Berkeley County School District =

School district in South Carolina, United States

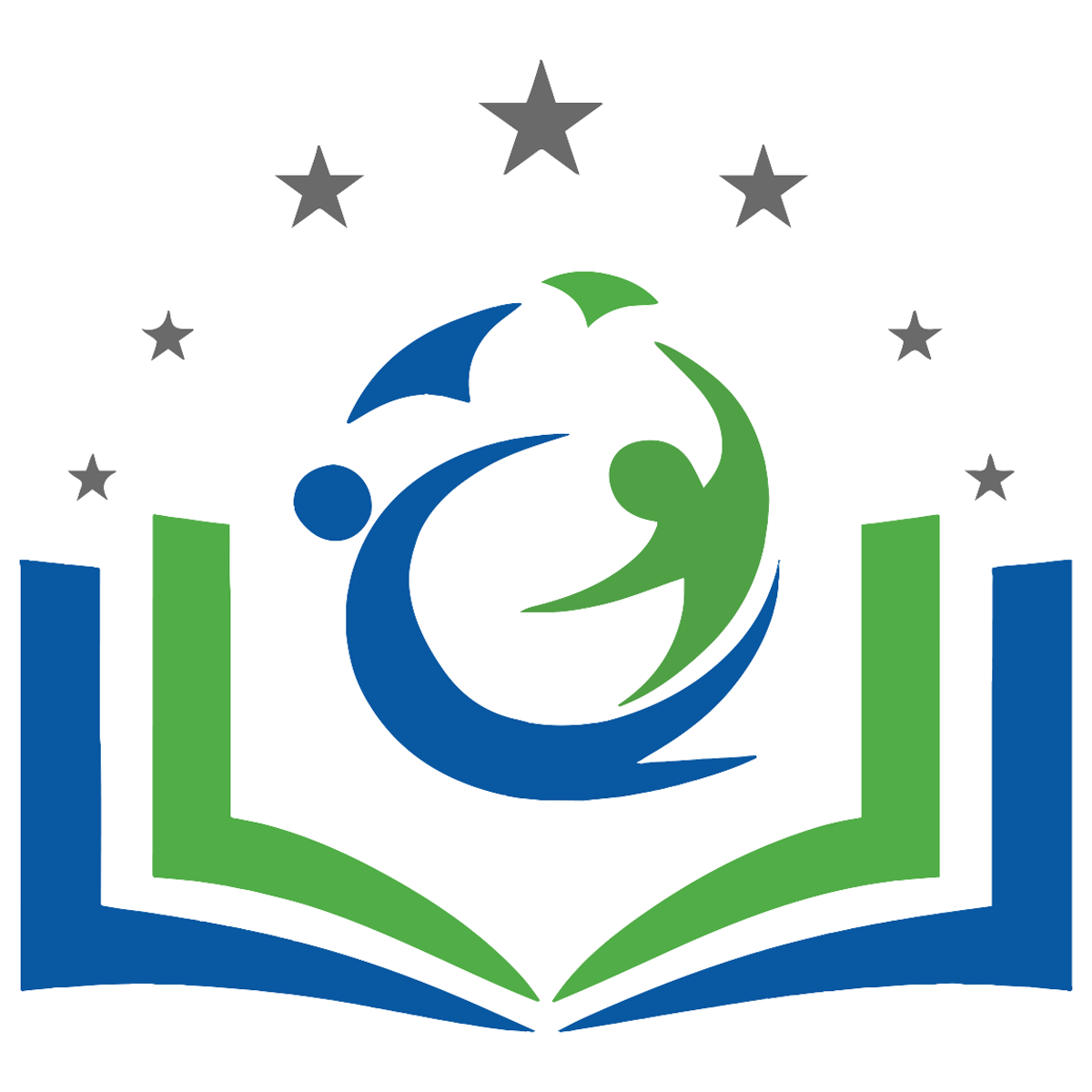

Address
- 107 Main Street Moncks Corner, Berkeley, South Carolina, 29461; United States

District information
- Type: Public
- Grades: PreK–12
- Superintendent: Dr. Anthony Dixon
- Deputy superintendent(s): Dr. Karen Whitley
- Chair of the board: Sally Wofford
- Schools: 48
- Budget: $486,007,922.00
- NCES District ID: 4501170

Students and staff
- Students: 36,575
- Teachers: 2,287.0 (FTE)
- Staff: 1,524.2
- Student–teacher ratio: 15.99

Other information
- Website: www.bcsdschools.net

The Berkeley County School District is a school district within Berkeley County, South Carolina, United States. It is based in Moncks Corner and serves all of Berkeley County including the portion of the City of Charleston on Daniel Island and the Cainhoy Peninsula.

Its attendance area is the entire county.

== History ==
Berkeley County School District was founded in 1912 in Moncks Corner, S.C.

In 2011 Rodney Thompson became the superintendent. By 2015 he received a criminal indictment on a school bond campaign-related ethics offense, and he was removed from his position. The district made two attempts at finding a new superintendent, with the second occurring after a finalist dropped out of the process. The district selected Brenda Blackburn, previously the Montgomery County Public Schools (Virginia) superintendent, and she took the position on November 1, 2015.

By 2017 the Federal Bureau of Investigation (FBI) investigated potential embezzlement. The district fired chief financial officer Brantley Thomas on February 7, 2017. In March of that year superintendent Brenda Blackburn resigned, and Deon Jackson became the interim superintendent.

In August 2017, Dr. Eddie Ingram was hired as the superintendent of Berkeley County School District. Ingram came to BCSD after having previously served as the superintendent for Darlington County School District in Darlington, SC for several years. Prior to his time in Darlington, Ingram spent four years as the superintendent of Franklin County Schools in North Carolina. He also spent time working in North Carolina's state education department. Dr. Ingram is credited with assisting BCSD in several positive movements, including but not limited to a focus on innovation in the classroom and personalized learning. Ingram encouraged "unhitching teachers from the post" and discouraged "teaching to the test."

Dr. Ingram retired from Berkeley County School District in summer of 2021, and Mr. Deon Jackson was selected as the district 's superintendent.

On November 15, 2022, Mr. Deon Jackson was terminated from his position as Superintendent by a board vote of 6-3. On the same day the Berkeley County Board of Education voted to terminate the in-house lawyer, Tiffany Richardson, by a vote of 6-3. Mr. Deon Jackson was replaced by Superintendent, Dr. Anthony Dixon, by a board vote of 6-1. Dr. Anthony Dixon was previously employed by the Berkeley County School District as Chief of Academics and Innovation as well as Chief of Secondary Schools (2020-2022). He was then hired by the Charleston County School District as the interim Chief of Schools in August 2022.

In October 2025, due to overcrowding in the district's current schools, two new schools, named Bee Tree Elementary and Midtown Middle schools, are being constructed near Summerville, South Carolina and are set to open in August 2026.

== School Board ==
District	Name	Position	Term ends
At-Large	Cindy Coats	Member	11/2028
1	Mr. Michael Ramsey	Vice-Chair	11/2028
2	Mr. Stafford McQuillin	Member	11/2026
3	Mr. Joseph Baker	Member	11/2028
4	Mrs. Kathy Littleton	Member	11/2026
5	Angelina Davenport	Member	11/2028
6	Mrs. Sally Wofford	Chair	11/2026
7	Mrs. Yvonne Bradley	Member	11/2028
8	Dr. Crystal Wigfall	Member	11/2026

== Superintendents ==
Name	Position
Dr. Anthony Dixon	Superintendent
Dr. Karen Whitley	Deputy Superintendent

== District Executives ==
Name	Position
Diane Driggers	Chief Technology and Infrastructure Officer
Aimee Fulmer	Chief Human Resources Officer
Adam Davis	Chief Operations Officer
Tim McDowell	Chief Pupil Services Officer
Dr. Kylon Middleton	Chief Officer of Inclusive Excellence and Student Support
Katie Tanner	Chief Communications & Community Engagement Officer
Marcie Abrahamson	Chief Finance Officer
Dr. Susan Gehlmann	Chief Academics and Innovation Officer

== Schools ==
=== Magnet schools ===
- Berkeley Middle College
- Berkeley Center for the Arts (at GCH)
- Marrington Middle School of the Arts
- Howe Hall AIMS Elementary
- H.E. Bonner Elementary

=== High schools ===
Traditional:

- Berkeley High School
- Cane Bay High School
- Cross High School
- Goose Creek High School
- Hanahan High School
- Philip Simmons High School
- Stratford High School
- Timberland High School

Alternative:

- Berkeley County Next Step Learning Center (formerly Berkeley Alternative School)

=== K-8 schools ===
- Daniel Island School
- Carolyn Lewis School

=== Middle schools ===
- Berkeley Middle School
- Cane Bay Middle School
- College Park Middle School
- Hanahan Middle School
- Macedonia Middle School
- Midtown Middle School
- St. Stephen Middle School
- Sangaree Middle School
- Sedgefield Middle School
- Philip Simmons Middle School
- Westview Middle School

=== Elementary schools ===
- Bee Tree Elementary
- Berkeley Elementary
- Berkeley Intermediate
- Boulder Bluff Elementary
- Bowen's Corner Elementary
- Cainhoy Elementary
- Cane Bay Elementary
- College Park Elementary
- Cross Elementary
- Devon Forest Elementary
- Foxbank Elementary
- Goose Creek Elementary
- H.E. Bonner Elementary
- Hanahan Elementary
- J.K. Gourdin Elementary
- Marrington Elementary
- Mount Holly Elementary
- Nexton Elementary
- Philip Simmons Elementary
- St. Stephen Elementary
- Sangaree Elementary
- Sangaree Intermediate
- Westview Elementary
- Westview Primary
- Whitesville Elementary
