= Otranto Plantation Indigo Vats =

- U.S. National Register of Historic Places
- Location within South Carolina Location within the United States
- Location: Secondary Road 503, east of Goose Creek, near Goose Creek, South Carolina
- Coordinates: 32°59′2″N 79°55′57″W
- Area: less than one acre
- NRHP reference No.: 89002150
- Added to NRHP: December 21, 1989

Otranto Plantation Indigo Vats are historic indigo vats located near Goose Creek, Berkeley County, South Carolina. Indigo vats are where fermentation and settlement processes for production of indigo dyestuff were accomplished. Each vat measures approximately 14 feet square and has a stuccoed interior. The upper vat, known as the "steeper vat", was used for the fermentation of indigo plants with the liquor drawn through a small portal into the "beater vat" below. The liquor was agitated, allowed to settle, and the remaining sludge strained, molded into cakes, and dried. The Otranto Plantation Indigo Vats were relocated by the Verona Chemical Company, later Mobay Corporation, from Otranto Plantation to their present site in 1979 to save them from demolition. They are the only such structures know to be in existence in South Carolina.

It was listed in the National Register of Historic Places in 1989.
