= Justin Smoak =

American baseball player (born 1986)

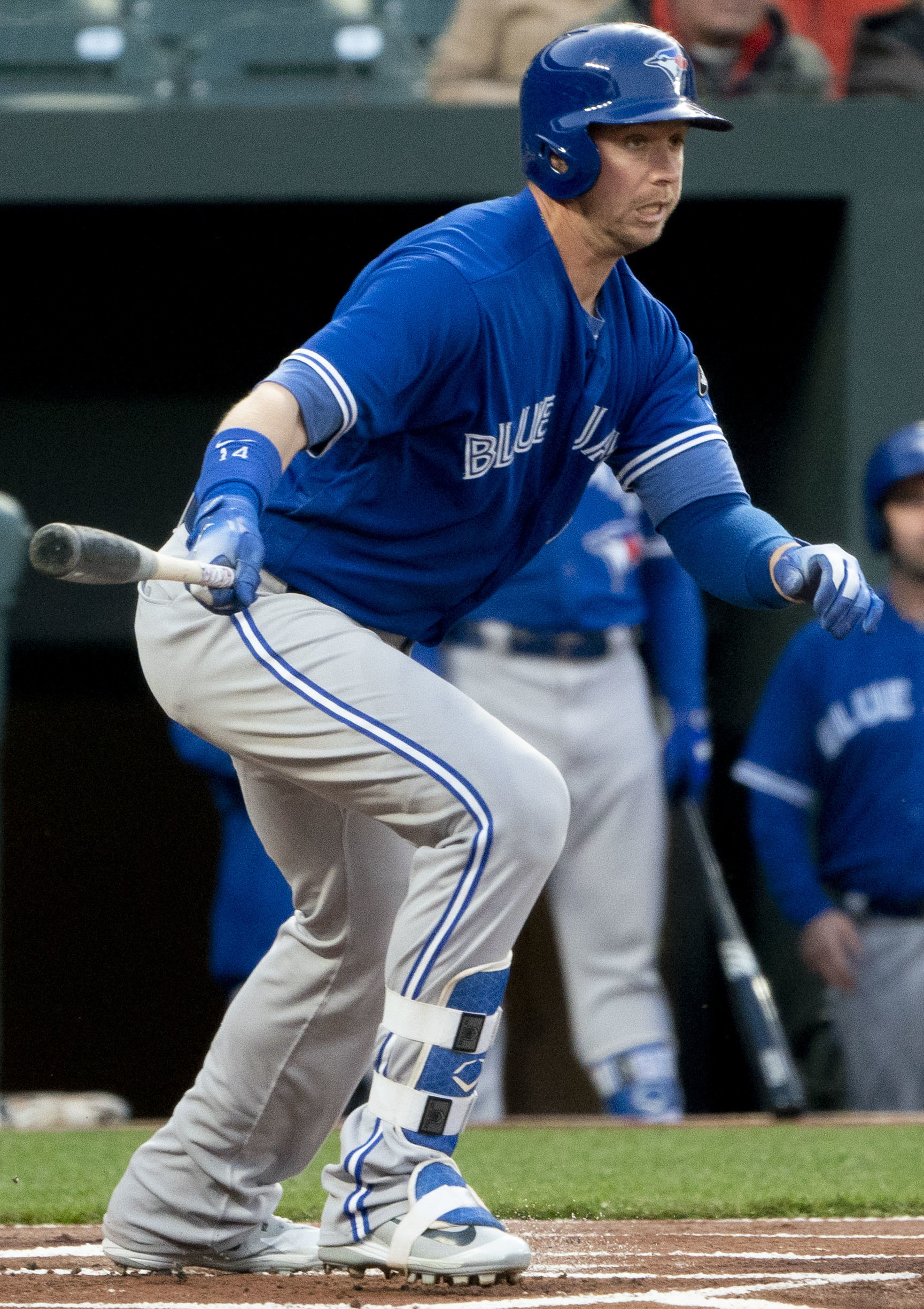
- Smoak with the Toronto Blue Jays in 2018
- First baseman
- Born: December 5, 1986 (age 39); Goose Creek, South Carolina, U.S.
- Batted: Switch Threw: Left

Professional debut
- MLB: April 23, 2010, for the Texas Rangers
- NPB: April 27, 2021, for the Yomiuri Giants

Last appearance
- MLB: September 17, 2020, for the San Francisco Giants
- NPB: June 11, 2021, for the Yomiuri Giants

MLB statistics
- Batting average: .229
- Home runs: 196
- Runs batted in: 570

NPB statistics
- Batting average: .272
- Home runs: 7
- Runs batted in: 14
- Stats at Baseball Reference

Teams
- Texas Rangers (2010); Seattle Mariners (2010–2014); Toronto Blue Jays (2015–2019); Milwaukee Brewers (2020); San Francisco Giants (2020); Yomiuri Giants (2021)

Career highlights and awards
- All-Star (2017)
Medals
Men's baseball
Representing United States
Baseball World Cup
Gold medal – first place	2009 Nettuno	National team
Pan American Games
Silver medal – second place	2007 Rio de Janeiro	National team

Justin Kyle Smoak (born December 5, 1986) is an American former professional baseball first baseman. He played in Major League Baseball (MLB) for the Texas Rangers, Seattle Mariners, Toronto Blue Jays, Milwaukee Brewers, and San Francisco Giants and in Nippon Professional Baseball (NPB) for the Yomiuri Giants.

Smoak played baseball for Stratford High School and the University of South Carolina. He was the 11th overall selection in the 2008 MLB draft by the Texas Rangers. He made his MLB debut with the Rangers in 2010, and was traded to the Seattle Mariners that season. He was claimed by the Blue Jays off waivers in 2014, and played for them until 2019. He was an All Star in 2017, and was fifth in the American League that season with 38 home runs.

== High school ==
Smoak graduated from Stratford High School in 2005, after four years of high school baseball. It wasn't until his junior year that scouts began to notice his talent, as they were originally there to scout his teammate and friend, Matt Wieters. He was named by American Baseball Coaches Association, Baseball America, and Collegiate Baseball as a 2005 high school All-American. He was also one of 36 high school players in the nation to play in the 2005 high school All-American baseball game, named South Carolina AAAA Player of the Year in 2004 and 2005, named co-Mr. Baseball for 2005 in South Carolina (alongside Gamecock teammate Reese Havens), made the 2004 and 2005 South Carolina AAAA All-State team, and a member of the 2005 South Carolina AAAA state championship team while with the Stratford Knights. He was initially drafted by the Oakland Athletics as a 16th-round pick in 2005 upon graduation, but instead attended the University of South Carolina.

== College ==
Smoak went on to play college baseball for the South Carolina Gamecocks for three years. After batting .303 with 17 home runs and 63 RBIs, Smoak earned Freshman All-American honors. He followed up with a .315 batting average, 22 home runs, and 72 RBIs in his sophomore year, good enough to be tabbed as a third-team All-American. For his junior year, Smoak batted .383, with 23 home runs and 72 RBIs. Smoak was a semi-finalist for the Golden Spikes Award in 2007 and 2008. Smoak is South Carolina's all-time home run king with 62, having broken Hank Small's record of 48, which stood for over 30 years. He is also South Carolina's career leader in RBIs and walks.

== Cape Cod League and Team USA ==
In the summer of 2006, Smoak played for the Cotuit Kettleers in the Cape Cod Baseball League (CCBL). He led all hitters with 11 home runs, a .565 slugging percentage, and 21 extra-base hits, en route to the MVP award. Smoak is a member of the CCBL Hall of Fame class of 2022.

In the summer of 2007, Smoak was a representative for Team USA. During the 2007 Pan American Games, Smoak struggled, hitting .190 for the tournament. He won a silver medal there, when his team lost to Cuba in the finals. Later, he competed with Team USA again in the 2007 World Port Tournament. However, he didn't fare much better, as he finished with a .208 average, though he did lead the tournament with three doubles. In all, Smoak hit .223 and had a .380 slugging percentage for Team USA over the summer.

In 2009, Smoak again represented his country in the IBAF Baseball World Cup. Smoak hit nine home runs and drove in 22 runs, and was named to the 2009 IBAF World Cup All-Tournament Team along with fellow Team USA players Terry Tiffee and Jon Weber. He was also named the 2009 Baseball World Cup's Most Valuable Player. He won the USA Baseball Richard W. "Dick" Case Player of the Year Award in 2009.

== Professional career ==
=== Draft ===
Smoak was the 11th overall selection in the 2008 MLB draft by the Texas Rangers. USA Today opined that "getting Smoak at No. 11 may be the best-value pick of the first round."

Several scouting reports wrote that Smoak's biggest strength was his ability to hit for both power and average on both sides of the plate. Some scouts compared Smoak to fellow switch hitters Mark Teixeira and Chipper Jones. Smoak's defense was described by mlb.com as follows: "He's got an average arm, but it's good enough for first base... He's not bad around the base with good hands.... The lack of footspeed and heavy lower half provide very limited range." Baseball America wrote that, as a first baseman, Smoak had "Gold Glove-caliber actions and soft hands", as well as "advanced footwork and instincts at first base", though they wrote that he had merely adequate arm strength. As to his running speed, mlb.com wrote: "He's below average, with heavy legs. He's a bit stiff and knock-kneed."

=== Texas Rangers ===
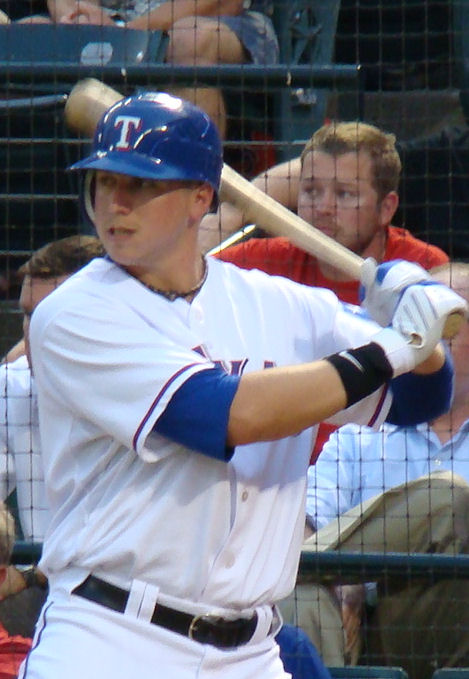
Smoak as a rookie for the Texas Rangers in 2010

Smoak did not sign a professional contract until 15 minutes before MLB's deadline for teams to sign draft picks, with Texas general manager Jon Daniels saying: "This is a day we would have liked to have seen happen two months ago, but we think 10 or 15 years from now that will be irrelevant." The Rangers gave Smoak a $3.5 million signing bonus and assigned him to one of their Single-A affiliates, the Clinton LumberKings.

Smoak began play in the 2009 season for the Double–A Frisco RoughRiders. He was promoted on July 8, 2009, to the Triple-A Oklahoma City RedHawks. Smoak entered 2010 ranked among the best prospects in baseball.

Smoak was called up by the Rangers on April 22, 2010, and made his MLB debut the following evening in a game against the Detroit Tigers. He recorded his first MLB hit on April 26, against the Tigers. Smoak set a franchise record by drawing at least one walk in each of his first four games. Smoak got his first MLB home run against the White Sox on April 29 off Gavin Floyd, and hit his first MLB home run while batting right-handed on May 3, against Oakland off Jerry Blevins. On June 13, playing in Milwaukee, Smoak became the first player in Rangers history to strike out five times in a nine-inning game. In 2010 for Texas, he batted .209/.316/.353.

=== Seattle Mariners ===
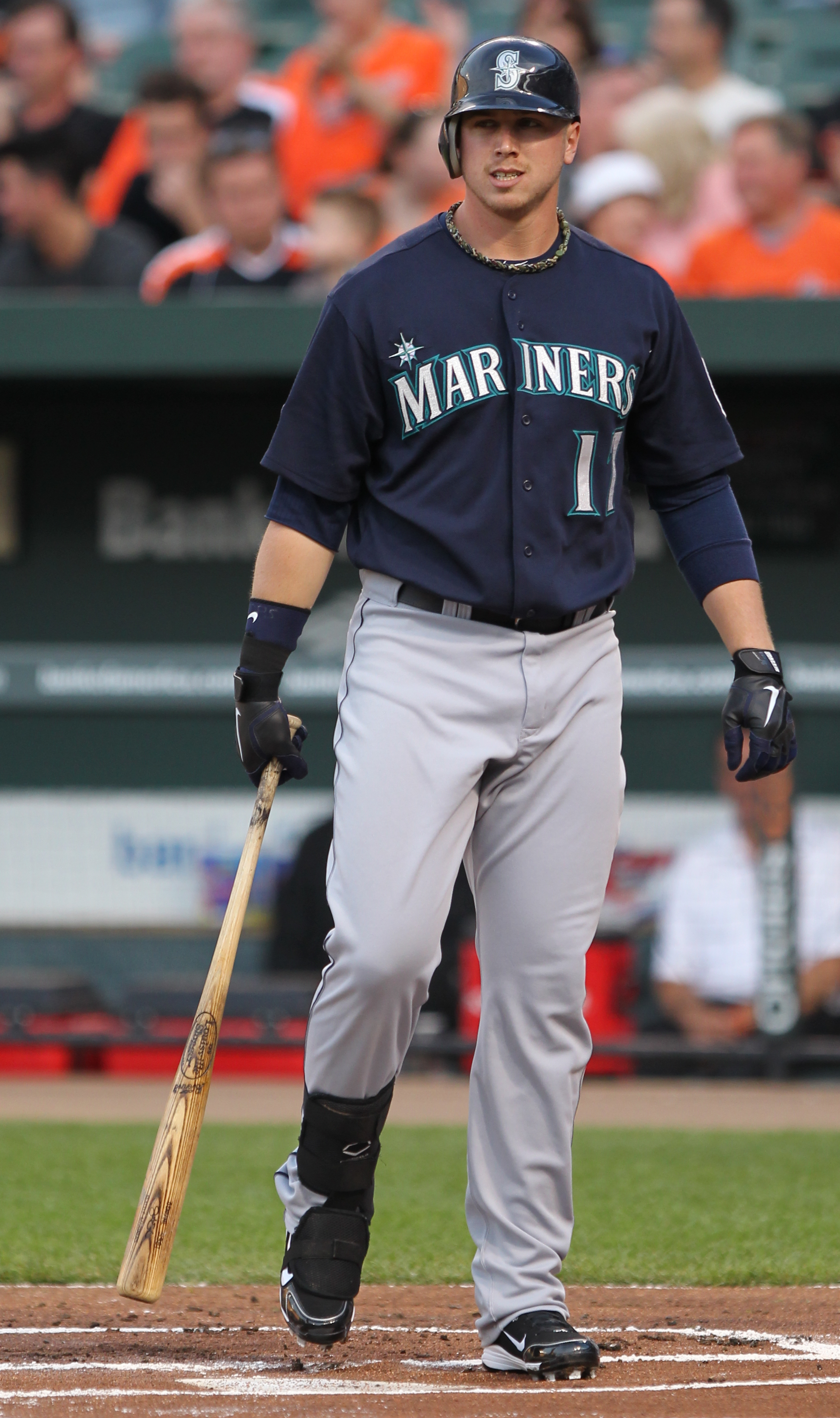
Smoak with the Seattle Mariners in 2011

On July 9, 2010, Smoak was traded to the Seattle Mariners with prospects Blake Beavan, Josh Lueke, and Matt Lawson, for Cliff Lee and Mark Lowe. Smoak was sent down to Triple-A Tacoma on July 31. He returned to the Mariners on September 18 and batted .340 with three home runs in the final 14 games of his rookie season. Former Seattle SuperSonics announcer Kevin Calabro gave him the nickname "The Freak From Goose Creek". In 2010, he batted .239/.287/.407 for Seattle, with five home runs and 14 RBIs.

In 2011, Smoak appeared in 123 games and hit .234/.323/.396 with 15 home runs and 55 RBIs.

On July 23, 2012, Smoak was optioned to Triple-A Tacoma, after his batting average dropped down to .189 in the middle of a 1-for-25 slump. A few weeks later he was brought back up to the Mariners due to an injury to first baseman Mike Carp. In 2012, he batted .217/.290/.364 with 19 home runs and 51 RBI in 132 games played.

Smoak hit 20 home runs in 131 games played during the 2013 campaign.

In 2014, his final season in Seattle, Smoak batted .202/.275/.339 with seven home runs and 30 RBIs in 80 games.

=== Toronto Blue Jays ===
On October 28, 2014, the Toronto Blue Jays claimed Smoak off of waivers. On December 2, Smoak was non-tendered by the Blue Jays, making him a free agent. One day later, they re-signed him to a one-year, $1 million contract for the 2015 season.

He made his debut with Toronto on Opening Day, as a defensive replacement for Edwin Encarnación. On April 22, 2015, Smoak set the all-time record for most plate appearances without hitting a triple to open a career. He extended the record to 2,317 plate appearances, before hitting his first career triple on June 12, against the Boston Red Sox. In a game at Yankee Stadium on August 8, Smoak hit his first career grand slam, and also became the first Blue Jay to hit a grand slam against the Yankees at their home field. He split time at first base for most of the 2015 season with Chris Colabello. In 132 games, Smoak batted .226 with 18 home runs and a career-high 59 RBIs. From 2010 to 2015, his defense was below-average for a major league first baseman, as measured by UZR (Ultimate Zone Rating) and DRS (Defensive Runs Saved).

Smoak signed a one-year, $3.9 million contract for the 2016 season with the Blue Jays on December 2, 2015. He changed his uniform number from 13 back to 14, which he had vacated for David Price. On April 5, 2016, he stole his first base in 433 games. On May 3, Smoak hit a game-tying solo home run in the bottom of the ninth inning, and in the tenth inning, hit a walk-off two-run home run to defeat the Texas Rangers 3–1. On July 16, Smoak signed a two-year, $8.25 million extension with the Blue Jays that included a $6 million option for a third year, with a $250,000 buyout. He had an 0-for-29 slump with runners in scoring position, one at bat short of the team's all-time record for the longest hitless streak with runners in scoring position. Smoak played in 126 games for the Blue Jays in 2016, and hit .217/.314/.391 with 14 home runs and 34 RBIs. He struck out 112 times in 341 plate appearances; his 32.8% strikeout rate was the 6th-highest in major league baseball for players with at least 330 plate appearances.

He was included on the team's Wild Card and Division Series rosters, but was left off the Championship Series roster. On October 15, Smoak was added to Toronto's ALCS roster after Devon Travis was removed due to injury.

In 2017, Smoak was the American League starting first baseman for the 2017 Major League Baseball All-Star Game. At the time, Smoak had a .303 batting average and 22 home runs, both of which were career highs. On August 25, Smoak hit his 35th home run of the season, and broke José Cruz Jr.'s franchise record for home runs in a single season by a switch-hitter. Smoak ended the 2017 season batting .270 with 128 strikeouts in 560 at bats, and as the Blue Jays' leader in both home runs (38) and RBIs (90), while seeing the highest percentage of curveballs of all MLB hitters (16.6%).

Smoak struggled to match his 2017 offensive numbers the following season. On August 20, 2018, Smoak cleared revocable waivers ahead of the August 31 trade deadline, fueling speculation that he was about to be moved. By the end of the season, Smoak batted .242 with 156 strikeouts in 505 at bats, and was tied for first on the team in home runs (25) and led the team in RBIs (77) and OBP (.350). He struck out in 26.3% of his at bats, the 8th-highest rate in the American League.

=== Milwaukee Brewers ===
On December 19, 2019, Smoak signed a one-year, $5 million contract with the Milwaukee Brewers. Smoak was designated for assignment by the Brewers on September 3, 2020. To that point, he had hit .186/.262/.381 with five home runs over 126 plate appearances. He was released on September 7.

=== San Francisco Giants ===
On September 9, 2020, Smoak signed a minor league contract with the San Francisco Giants. Smoak was selected to the active roster the next day. After going hitless in six at-bats, the Giants designated Smoak for assignment on September 21. On September 23, Smoak was released.

=== Yomiuri Giants ===
On January 7, 2021, Smoak signed with the Yomiuri Giants of Nippon Professional Baseball (NPB). On June 18, Smoak decided to leave the Giants and Japan in order to return to the United States to be with his family. In 34 games with Yomiuri, Smoak batted .272/.336/.482 with 7 home runs and 14 RBI.

== Personal life ==
In November 2010, Smoak married his high school sweetheart, Kristin Bevacqua. They have two daughters. In April 2011, Smoak's father, Keith, with whom he had been very close, died of cancer.

== See also ==
- List of Toronto Blue Jays team records
