= Stratford High School (South Carolina) =

Coordinates: 33.0126715°N 80.0859218°W

Location
- 951 Crowfield Blvd; Goose Creek, South Carolina 29445; United States

Information
- Type: Public high school
- Established: 1983 (43 years ago)
- School district: Berkeley County School District
- Superintendent: Anthony Dixon
- CEEB code: 410831
- Principal: Brion Packett
- Teaching staff: 165.00 (on an FTE basis)
- Grades: 9–12
- Enrollment: 2,710 (2023-2024)
- Student to teacher ratio: 16.42
- Campus type: Suburban
- Colors: Red and black
- Mascot: Knight
- Nickname: The Knights
- Yearbook: Excalibur
- Website: https://www.bcsdschools.net/SHS

Stratford High School is a public high school located in Goose Creek, South Carolina. It serves grades 9–12 and is a part of the Berkeley County School District. The school was originally built in 1981, and opened in 1983 with approximately 1100 students. An addition was added in 1998 to increase the physical capacity to 1600 students. The high school now serves over 1800 students who are housed in 113 classrooms in the main building and 16 portable classrooms outside the main building.

== Notable alumni ==
- Mario Anderson – Class of 2019, college football player
- Harold Green – Class of 1986, football player
- Justin Smoak – Class of 2005, baseball player
- Matt Wieters – Class of 2004, baseball player
