= Goose Creek, South Carolina =

Goose Creek
- City
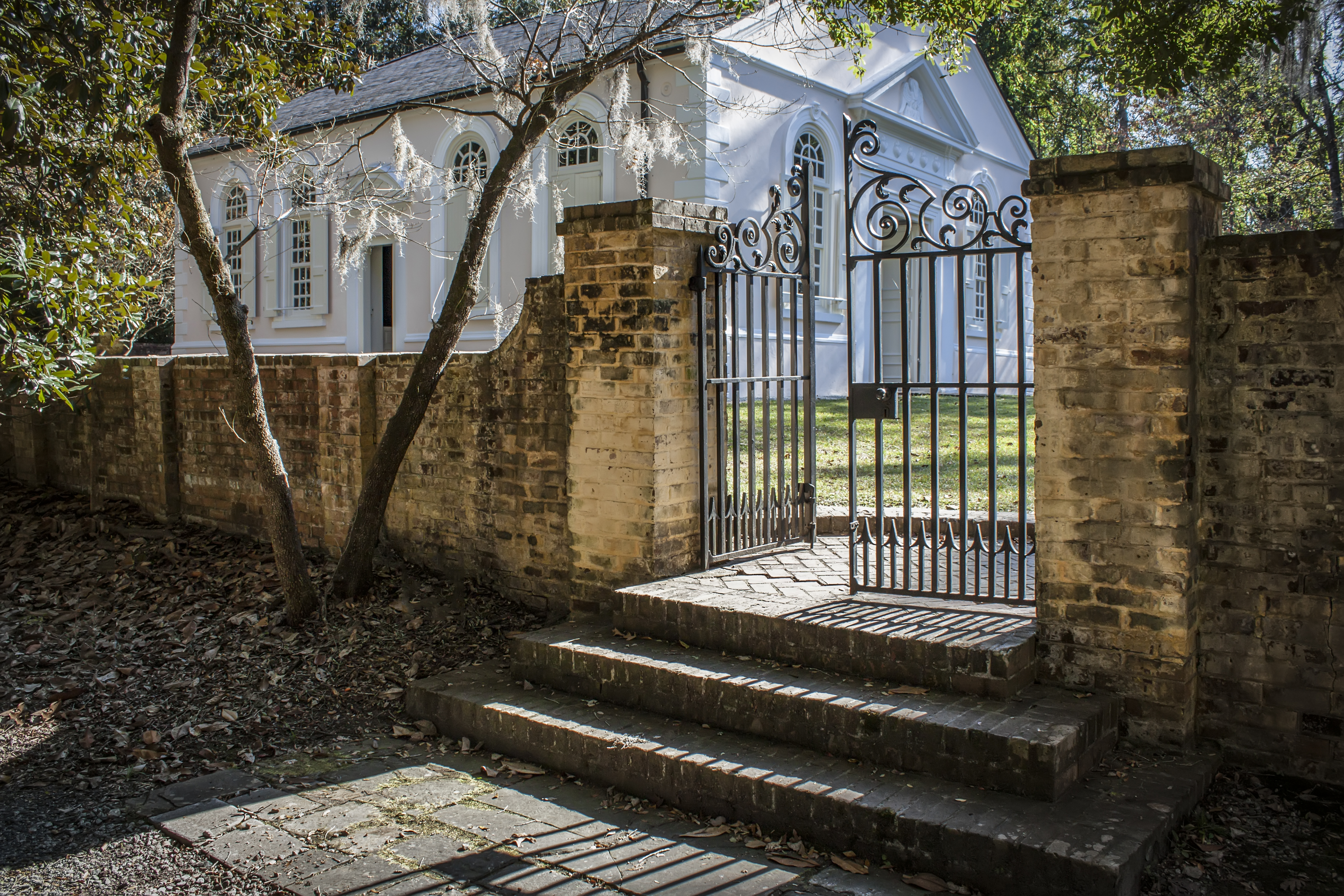
- St. James' Church

- Flag Seal
- Motto: "Small Town Vibe. Big Time Recreation."
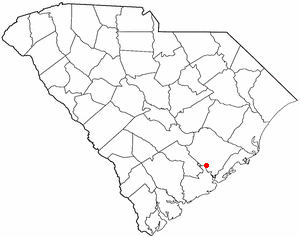
- Location in South Carolina

- Location in the United States
- Coordinates: 33°00′36″N 80°00′26″W
- Country: United States
- State: South Carolina
- County: Berkeley
- Incorporated: 1961
- Named for: A creek resembling a goose

Area
  - Total: 42.84 sq mi (110.95 km^{2})
  - Land: 42.34 sq mi (109.67 km^{2})
  - Water: 0.49 sq mi (1.28 km^{2}) 1.14%
- Elevation: 13 ft (4.0 m)

Population (2020)
  - Total: 45,946
  - Density: 1,085.0/sq mi (418.93/km^{2})
- Time zone: UTC−5 (Eastern (EST))
  - Summer (DST): UTC−4 (EDT)
- ZIP Code: 29445
- Area codes: 843, 854
- FIPS code: 45-29815
- GNIS feature ID: 2403714
- Website: www.goosecreeksc.gov

Goose Creek is the most populous city in Berkeley County in the U.S. state of South Carolina. The population was 45,946 at the 2020 census, making it the 7th-most populous city in the state. Most of Naval Support Activity Charleston is in Goose Creek. As defined by the U.S. Office of Management and Budget, and used only by the U.S. Census Bureau and other federal agencies for statistical purposes, Goose Creek is included within the Charleston-North Charleston, SC Metropolitan Statistical Area.

== History ==
Although the city of Goose Creek was established in 1961, its history dates back many centuries. In the 1670s the Etiwan moved to the area to escape the Westo, seeking protection among the plantations of early colonists who were often referred to as the "Goose Creek men", mostly settled a few miles north of Charleston near a stream called Goose Creek, a tributary of the Cooper River. The Goose Creek men became leaders of the early Indian trade, and by the 1690s many held important offices in the colonial government. At first the Goose Creek men dealt mainly in Indian slaves, while later the deerskin trade dominated. Several colonial governors were Goose Creek men, such as James Moore and Robert Daniell. Other prominent men included brothers Daniel and Pierre Bacot.

The Otranto Plantation Indigo Vats and St. James Church are listed on the National Register of Historic Places.

== Geography ==
Goose Creek is located in southern Berkeley County. It is bordered to the east by the Cooper River and the Back River, to the southeast by an outer portion of the city of Charleston, to the southwest by the city of Hanahan and (farther to the west) the city of North Charleston in Charleston County, and to the west by the unincorporated community of Ladson.

According to the United States Census Bureau, the city has a total area of 42.84 square miles (111.0 km^{2}), of which 42.35 square miles (109.7 km^{2}) is land and 0.49 square miles (1.3 km^{2}) (1.14%) is water.

== Demographics ==
Historical population
Census	Pop.	Note	%±
1970	3,825		—
1980	17,811		365.6%
1990	24,692		38.6%
2000	29,208		18.3%
2010	35,938		23.0%
2020	45,946		27.8%
2025 (est.)	52,010	▲	13.2%
U.S. Decennial Census

=== 2020 census ===
As of the 2020 census, Goose Creek had a population of 45,946 people and 10,341 families. The median age was 33.1 years; 23.1% of residents were under the age of 18 and 11.9% were 65 years of age or older. For every 100 females there were 104.3 males, and for every 100 females age 18 and over there were 103.9 males age 18 and over.

As of the 2020 census, 96.0% of residents lived in urban areas, while 4.0% lived in rural areas.

As of the 2020 census, there were 16,298 households in Goose Creek, of which 35.9% had children under the age of 18 living in them. Of all households, 52.8% were married-couple households, 15.9% were households with a male householder and no spouse or partner present, and 25.8% were households with a female householder and no spouse or partner present. About 21.0% of all households were made up of individuals and 6.7% had someone living alone who was 65 years of age or older.

As of the 2020 census, there were 17,269 housing units, of which 5.6% were vacant. The homeowner vacancy rate was 1.4% and the rental vacancy rate was 8.3%.

Racial composition as of the 2020 census
Race	Number	Percent
White	27,725	60.3%
Black or African American	9,995	21.8%
American Indian and Alaska Native	292	0.6%
Asian	1,620	3.5%
Native Hawaiian and Other Pacific Islander	66	0.1%
Some other race	2,244	4.9%
Two or more races	4,004	8.7%
Hispanic or Latino (of any race)	4,349	9.5%

=== 2010 census ===
At the 2010 census there were 35,938 people, 8,947 households, and 7,443 families residing in the city. The population density was 921.6 inhabitants per square mile (355.8/km^{2}). There were 9,482 housing units at an average density of 299.2 units per square mile (115.5 units/km^{2}). The racial makeup of the city was 78.50% White, 14.22% African American, 0.59% Native American, 2.66% Asian, 0.12% Pacific Islander, 1.56% from other races, and 2.36% from two or more races. Hispanic or Latino of any race were 4.05% of the population.

There were 8,947 households, out of which 49.7% had children under the age of 18 living with them, 68.9% were married couples living together, 10.6% had a female householder with no husband present, and 16.8% were non-families. 12.9% of all households were made up of individuals, and 2.9% had someone living alone who was 65 years of age or older. The average household size was 2.94 and the average family size was 3.22.

In the city, the distribution of the population by age was 29.6% under the age of 18, 18.2% from 18 to 24, 32.5% from 25 to 44, 15.4% from 45 to 64, and 4.3% who were 65 years of age or older. The median age was 26 years. For every 100 females, there were 115.7 males. For every 100 females age 18 and over, there were 120.3 males.

The median income for a household in the city was $45,919, and the median income for a family was $47,937. Males had a median income of $31,965 versus $23,754 for females. The per capita income for the city was $16,905. About 5.8% of families and 6.8% of the population were below the poverty line, including 8.0% of those under the age of 18 and 7.3% of those 65 and older.

== Armed forces ==
Portions of the Charleston metropolitan area (Charleston, North Charleston, Goose Creek, and Hanahan) are home to branches of the United States military. During the Cold War, the Naval Base (1902–1996) became the third largest U.S. homeport serving over 80 ships and submarines. In addition, the Charleston Naval Shipyard repaired frigates, destroyers, cruisers, sub tenders, and submarines. The shipyard was also equipped for the refueling of nuclear subs.

During this period, the Weapons Station was the Atlantic Fleet's loadout base for all nuclear ballistic missile submarines. Two SSBN "Boomer" squadrons and a sub tender were homeported at the Weapons Station, while one SSN attack squadron, Submarine Squadron 4, and a sub tender were homeported at the Naval Base. At the 1996 closure of the Station's Polaris Missile Facility Atlantic (POMFLANT), over 2,500 nuclear warheads and their UGM-27 Polaris, UGM-73 Poseidon, and UGM-96 Trident I delivery missiles (SLBM) were stored and maintained, guarded by a U.S. Marine Corps security force company.

In 2010, the Air Force base (3,877 acres) and Naval Weapons Station (>17,000 acres) merged to form Joint Base Charleston. Today, Joint Base Charleston, encompassing over 20,877 acres (8,449 ha) and supporting 53 military commands and federal agencies, provides service to over 79,000 airmen, sailors, soldiers, Marines, Coast Guardsmen, DOD civilians, dependents, and retirees.

=== Navy ===
- Naval Weapons Station, Joint Base Charleston (>17,000 acres (6,900 ha), 27 square miles (70 km^{2})), Goose Creek, and Hanahan
- Naval Information Warfare Center Atlantic (NAVWAR)
- Naval Nuclear Power Training Command
- Nuclear Power School
- Nuclear Power Training Unit
- Moored Training Nuclear Submarine, USS Daniel Webster (SSBN-626)
- Moored Training Nuclear Submarine, USS Sam Rayburn (SSBN-635)
- Moored Training Nuclear Submarine, USS La Jolla (SSN-701), 2015 delivery
- Moored Training Nuclear Submarine, USS San Francisco (SSN-711), After 2015 delivery
- Naval Consolidated Brig, Charleston, East Coast
- Mobile Mine Assembly Unit Eleven (MOMAU-11)
- Naval Operations Support Center Charleston
- Navy Reserve Center
- Navy Munitions Command CONUS, Detachment Charleston
- Explosive Ordnance Detachment
- Naval Health Clinic Charleston
- Navy Dental Clinic

=== Marines ===
- Marine Corps Reserve Center, Naval Weapons Station

=== Army ===
- South Carolina Army National Guard
- Army Reserve Training Center
- 841st Army Transportation Battalion
- 1182nd Army Deployment & Distribution Support Battalion
- 1189th Army Transportation Brigade, Reserve Support Command
- Army Strategic Logistics Activity
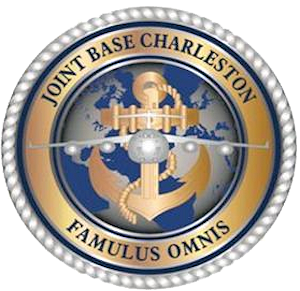
Joint Base Charleston

United States Marine Corps

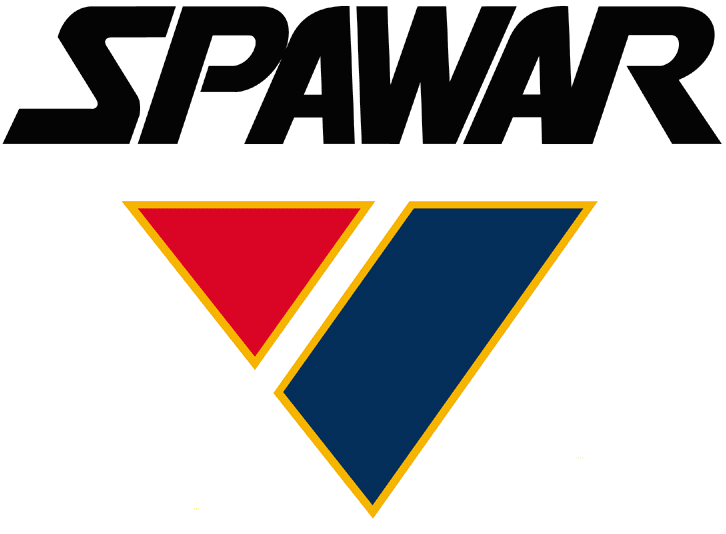
SPAWAR Systems Center Atlantic

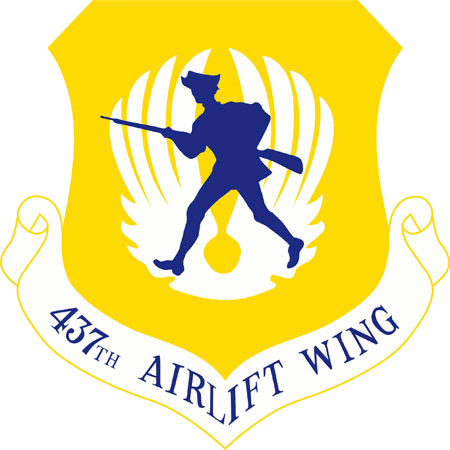
The 437 Airlift Wing

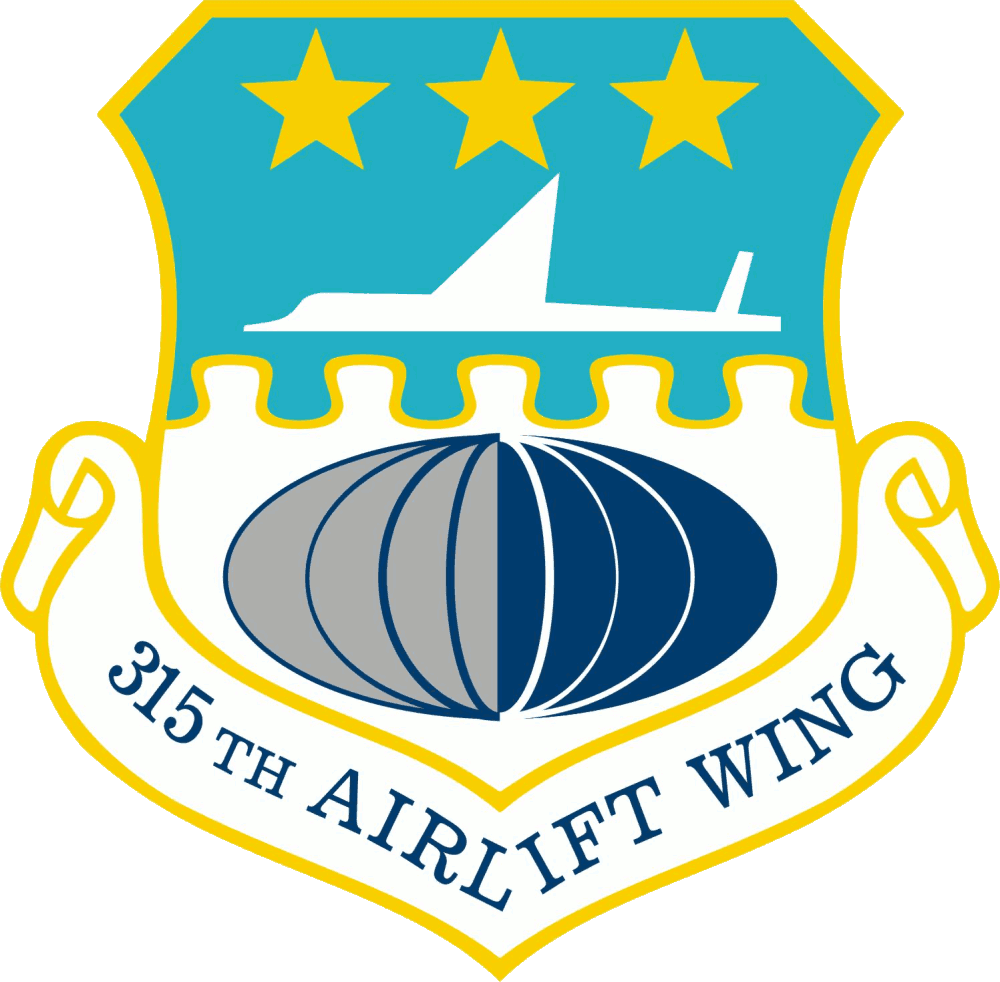
The 315 Airlift Wing

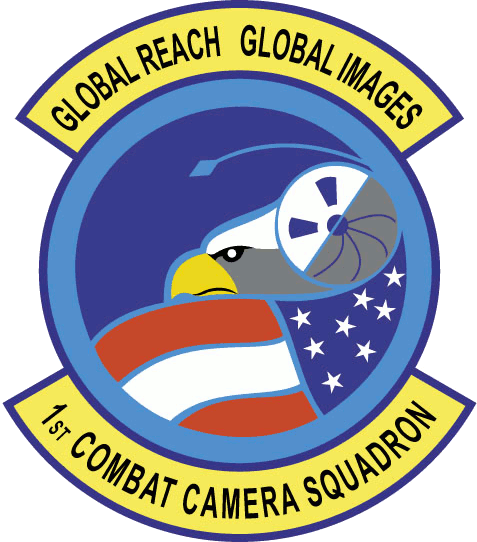
The 1st Combat Camera Squadron

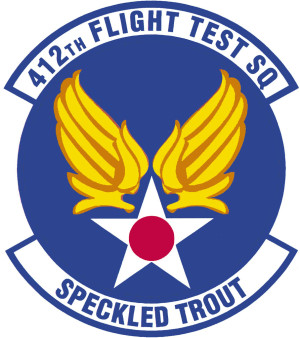
The 412 Flight Test Squadron

U.S. Army Corps of Engineers

== Police force ==
The Goose Creek Police Department is housed at the Marguerite H. Brown Municipal Center, along with the City Hall and Municipal Court, and is an active department within the community of Goose Creek. The Goose Creek Police Department is a CALEA accredited agency and works to maintain a good relationship with the citizens using the community policing method.

== Education ==
There are three high schools that serve the Goose Creek area. Goose Creek High School and Stratford High School serve students inside Goose Creek, while Cane Bay High School is located outside Goose Creek city limits and serves students from both in and out of Goose Creek's city limits. Goose Creek High School is the home of the Berkeley County School of the Arts (BCA) Program.

Goose Creek has a public library, a branch of the Berkeley County Library System.

== Notable people ==
- Curtis Campbell, president and CEO of H&R Block
- Madelyn Cline, actress
- Sean McPherson, South Dakota state legislator
- Brandon Shell, offensive lineman, New York Jets and Seattle Seahawks
- Justin Smoak, Major League Baseball player
- Thomas Porcher Stoney, 53rd Mayor of Charleston, South Carolina
- Matt Wieters, Major League Baseball player
- Joseph Young, orchestra conductor
- Amari Middleton aka. OsamaSon, Underground rapper

== See also ==
- List of municipalities in South Carolina
