= Cane Bay High School =

Public school in Summerville, South Carolina, US

Location
- 1624 State Road; Summerville, South Carolina 29486; United States
- Coordinates: 33°6′7″N 80°7′20″W

Information
- Type: Public secondary school
- Established: August 2008 (17 years ago)
- School district: Berkeley County School District
- CEEB code: 411880
- Principal: Christopher Buchholz
- Assistant Principals: Brigid Creeden, Ryan Rosendahl, Jeffrey Snow, Jonathan Rose, Amy Ray-Smith
- Teaching staff: 136.50 (on an FTE basis)
- Grades: 9–12
- Enrollment: 2,490 (2023–2024)
- Student to teacher ratio: 18.24
- Colors: Black, Blue, and White
- Nickname: Cobras
- Rivals: Berkeley HS, Wando HS, Stratford HS, Summerville HS
- Website: www.bcsdschools.net/o/cbh

Cane Bay High School is a public secondary school located in Summerville, South Carolina. It is part of the Berkeley County School District and serves students in grades 9 through 12. The school was established in 2008 and, as of the 2023–2024 academic year, has an enrollment of approximately 2,490 students.

== History ==
Cane Bay High School opened in August 2008 with students in grades 9 and 10. By 2010, the school expanded to include all four grade levels. Its growth has been attributed to residential development in the surrounding areas, including Cane Bay Plantation, Nexton Village, and Carnes Crossroads. The school has been led by six different school principals.

Its main feeder school Cane Bay Middle School opened in 2012; in 2004 and 2023, respectively, Sangaree Middle School and Carolyn Lewis School opened, serving as feeder schools. Split feeder schools Westview Middle School, Berkeley Preparatory Academy, and Midtown Middle School opened in 2004, 2021, and 2026, respectively.

== Academics ==
The school offers a range of academic programs, including Advanced Placement (AP) courses, Honors classes, and Career and Technical Education (CTE). Specialized programs such as Project Lead the Way and a Gifted & Talented curriculum are also available. In 2025, the Berkeley County School District claimed that graduating seniors earned a total of $4,804,357 in scholarships.
