= Curtis Campbell (executive) =

American business executive (born 1972)

- Born: Curtis A. Campbell; 1972 (age 53–54)
- Occupation: Business executive
- Known for: President and CEO of H&R Block; Former president and CEO of TaxAct

Curtis A. Campbell (born 1972) is an American business executive. Since 2026 he serves as president and chief executive officer of H&R Block, and formerly held executive posts with TaxAct, Amazon Web Services and Dell.

== Education and background ==
Campbell is a graduate of Goose Creek High School in Goose Creek, South Carolina.

He earned a bachelor's degree in business administration from The Citadel and a Master of International Business from the University of South Carolina.

== Career ==
In May 2024, Campbell joined H&R Block as President, Global Consumer Tax and Chief Product Officer. He was elevated to his current position on January 1, 2026, upon the retirement of Jeff Jones.

Prior to joining Block, Campbell served as the president and CEO of TaxAct from 2018 until 2022, when the company was sold to Blucora, Inc. After the sale, he continued to lead the company until 2023.

Prior to TaxAct, Campbell held top level executive positions at Capital One, and Intuit.

Since 2021, Campbell has been a member of the board of directors of Jack Henry & Associates, a NASDAQ-listed financial technology company.
