= Goose Creek High School =

Public high school in Goose Creek, South Carolina, U.S.

Coordinates: 32°58′27″N 80°00′59″W

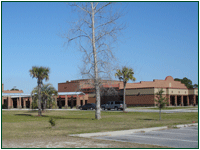

Location
- 1137 Redbank Road; Goose Creek, South Carolina; United States

Information
- Type: Public high school
- Established: 1969 (57 years ago)
- School district: Berkeley County School District
- Superintendent: Deon Jackson
- CEEB code: 410830
- Principal: William Wilson
- Teaching staff: 112.00 (on an FTE basis)
- Grades: 9–12
- Enrollment: 2,002 (2023–2024)
- Student to teacher ratio: 17.88
- Colors: Black and gold
- Mascot: Gators
- Nickname: Gators nation
- Yearbook: L'Esprit
- Website: www.bcsdschools.net/gch

Goose Creek High School is a public high school located in Goose Creek, South Carolina, United States. It is a part of the Berkeley County School District.

Goose Creek High School offers grades 9–12. It is a public high school, and was founded in 1970.

== Athletics ==
As of 2012, sports offered at Goose Creek High include baseball, boys' basketball, girls' basketball, cheerleading, cross country, football, track and field, soccer, softball, swimming, girls' tennis, girls' volleyball, and wrestling.

=== State championships ===
- 2009 – boys basketball
- 2011 – varsity football
- 2012 – girls basketball

== Notable alumni ==
- Curtis Campbell (1990), president and CEO of H&R Block
- Javon Kinlaw – National Football League (NFL) defensive tackle for the Washington Commanders.
- Brandon Shell – former NFL offensive tackle, son of Art Shell
- OsamaSon – Rapper, songwriter
- Paul Blase — First South Carolinian trained professional ice hockey player (US, Europe), Class of 2008.
