= Hanahan High School =

Location
- 6015 Murray Drive; Hanahan, South Carolina, Berkeley County 29410; United States
- 32.9154167°N 80.0078183°W

Information
- School type: Public high school
- Founded: 1958 (68 years ago)
- School board: Berkeley County School Board
- School district: Berkeley County School District
- Superintendent: Dr. Anthony S. Dixon
- CEEB code: 411524
- Chair: Doug Cooper
- Principal: Dr. Taylor J. Bradley
- Teaching staff: 64.00 (FTE)
- Grades: 9–12
- Gender: Co-educational
- Enrollment: 1,061 (2024–2025)
- Student to teacher ratio: 16.58
- Campus size: 23 acres
- Campus type: Suburban
- Colors: Orange and blue
- Athletics: Football, Baseball, Soccer, Track & Field, Lacrosse, Basketball, Golf, Tennis, Softball, Cross Country, Wrestling, Cheerleading, Swimming, Marching Band
- Mascot: Hawk
- Nickname: Hawks
- Rival: Bishop England High School
- Yearbook: Talon
- Website: www.bcsdschools.net/o/hhs

Hanahan High School is a public high school located in Hanahan, South Carolina, United States. It serves grades 9 through 12 and is a part of the Berkeley County School District. The principal is Dr. Taylor J. Bradley.

== History ==
Hanahan High School was opened in the fall of 1958 with 282 students, but demand quickly exceeded its capacity. An additional eight-room portion was begun on June 20, 1960 along the northern side of the original building. In 1969, a science wing of 11,000 square feet was added to the eastern end of the original building. Most of the original structure and additions were demolished and rebuilt starting in 2000 according to plans by F.W. Architects, Inc.

== Notable alumni ==
- Bryce Florie, former baseball pitcher
- Brandon Ford, former football player
- Marcus Howard, former football player
- Bobbie Phillips, actress
