= Timberland High School (South Carolina) =

High school in South Carolina, United States

Coordinates: 33.337°N 79.891°W

Location
- 1418 Gravel Hill Road; St. Stephen, (Berkeley County), South Carolina 29479; United States

Information
- Type: Public high school
- Principal: Tim Evans
- Staff: 49.80 (FTE)
- Enrollment: 724 (2023-2024)
- Student to teacher ratio: 14.54
- Colors: Green and orange
- Mascot: T-Wolves
- Nickname: Wolves

Timberland High School is a consolidated high school located in St. Stephen, South Carolina, United States. It is a part of the Berkeley County School District.

Timberland High serves the residents of Northern Berkeley County after the disbandment of St. Stephen High School, Macedonia High School, and Cainhoy High School. Timberland High School serves students from grades 9 to 12. In the 2016/2017 academic year, it had an enrollment of 688 students.

The Timberland High School mascot is a wolf. Its athletic program includes football, volleyball, boys' basketball, girls' basketball, wrestling, baseball, softball, girls' track, boys' track, girls' soccer, and boys' soccer.
