= Coal in Poland =

Coal mines in Poland

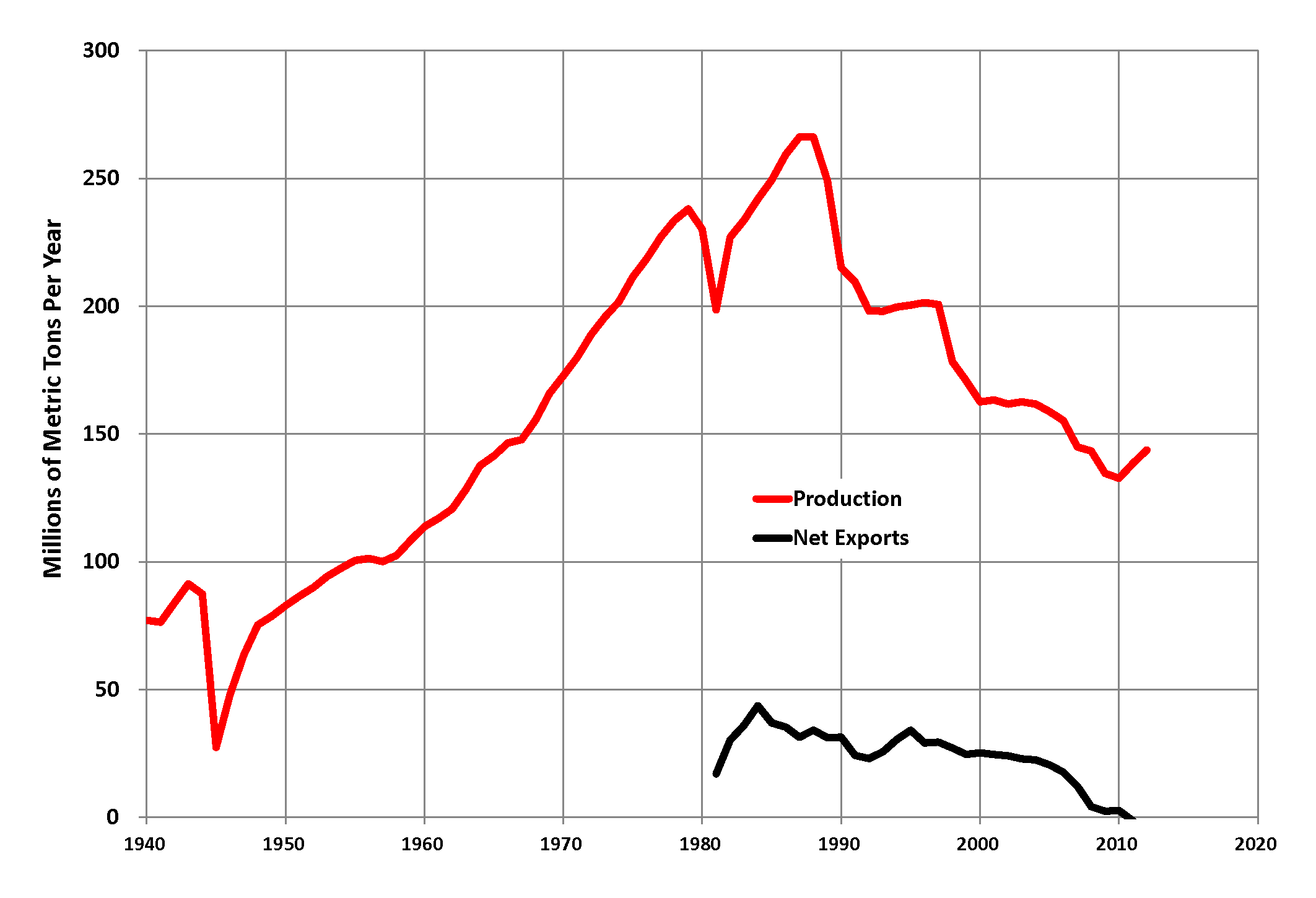
Coal production in Poland (1940–2012)

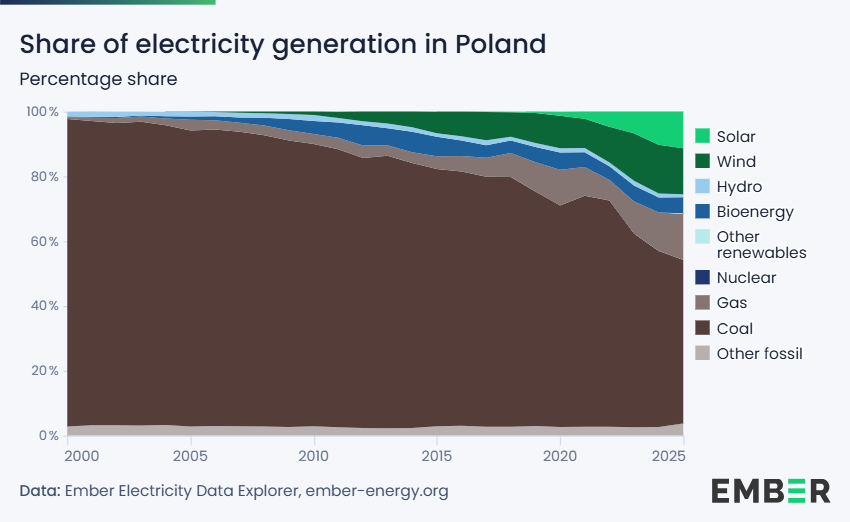
Poland electricity generation by source - percentage share

Coal in Poland is partly mined and partly imported. Poland is the second-largest coal-mining country in Europe, after Germany, and the ninth-largest coal producer in the world. The country consumes nearly all the coal it mines, and is no longer a major coal exporter.

Coal mines are concentrated mainly in Upper Silesia. The most profitable mines were Marcel Coal Mine and Zofiówka Coal Mine. Every third home in Poland uses coal for heating. Poland is the only EU country which mines hard coal.

In 2025 half of Poland's electricity was generated from coal. However extraction became increasingly difficult and expensive, and became uncompetitive against Russian imports, which were cheaper and of higher quality. Sometime after the 2022 Russian invasion of Ukraine Poland stopped importing from them. Coal mining now relies on government subsidies, taking billions of zloty every year. In 2020, the government and mining union agreed a plan to phase out coal by 2049, but this has been criticised by environmentalists as too late to be compatible with the Paris Agreement to limit climate change. As of 2025 methane still leaks from coal mines despite EU Methane Regulation.

== History ==
144 million metric tons of coal was mined in 2012, providing 55 percent of the country's primary energy consumption. In communist times (1945–1989) one of the most important and largest mines was 1 Maja Coal Mine.

In 2020, coal played a significant role in Poland's energy mix, making up to 69.5% of the nation's energy production and 68.5% of its electricity generation. It accounted for 40.2% of the Total Energy Supply (TES). The largest portion of coal consumption was in electricity and heat generation, representing 75.6% of the total demand. The industrial sector followed, utilizing 14.5%, and buildings were responsible for 9.9% of coal usage.

As of early 2022, Poland imported roughly a fifth of its coal, with 75% of these imports coming from Russia. In late March 2022, Poland's government announced that it would ban Russian coal imports due to the 2022 Russian invasion of Ukraine, with imports from Russia to cease entirely by April or May 2022. The effectiveness of this decision has been questioned as any trade ban would be likely to contravene European Union (EU) rules because the vast majority of Russian coal is imported by private companies. The Polish government has not outlined plans on how it will replace Russian imports (which stood at 8.3 mln tons or around 66% of all coal imported to Poland in 2021) or deal with reduced coal supply. Russia's Ministry of Energy expressed doubt that Poland would be able to rapidly replace Russian coal.

== Coal policy ==
Poland's coal policy, under the Energy Policy of Poland 2040 (EPP2040), aims to reduce coal use while maintaining economic stability in impacted regions. This includes decreasing coal's share in electricity from 68.5% in 2020 to 11–56% by 2040, influenced by European Union Emissions Trading System (ETS) prices. The strategy promotes gas, renewable, and nuclear energy, and seeks to phase out coal in heating by 2030 in urban areas and by 2040 in rural areas, with an exemption for "smokeless" coal, which is processed to reduce pollution and is allowed through 2040 to support domestic coal demand while mitigating air pollution.

As part of implementing these strategies, major utilities like PGE SA and Tauron Polska Energia SA are planning a carve-out of their coal-fired power plants into a separate entity by 2025. This move is crucial for these companies to reduce their direct exposure to coal, enabling them to regain access to financial markets and to fund further investments in renewable energy and other sustainable technologies.

The EU Just Transition Fund, with a EUR 17.5 billion budget, is expected to allocate EUR 3.5 billion to Poland to aid the transition. A 2021 agreement with coal trade unions plans the gradual closure of hard coal mines by 2049.

== Health impact ==
Coal mines are affecting the public health of the Polish population. Greenpeace estimate that in Poland 5,400 people per year die because of pollution from burned coal. There is also a link between the impact of air pollution on the public health of people. Pollution of coal mines in Poland caused approximately 630 cases of chronic bronchitis, 1,310 admissions to the hospitals, in total 359,200 and 27,830 asthma attacks for children under 18 years.

== Greenhouse gas emissions ==
Between 2010 and 2020, Poland observed a reduction in energy-related CO_{2} emissions, particularly from coal, which is a significant source of the country's emissions. CO_{2} emissions attributable to coal usage declined from 215 million tonnes (Mt) in 2010 to 157 Mt in 2020, representing 58% of Poland's total energy-related emissions by the end of the decade.

== Environment ==
Coal mining has dropped the water level of Lake Ostrowskie by almost two meters in the Kuyavia–Pomerania and the lakes in the Powidz Landscape Park. According to the University of Life Sciences in Poznań, the water drainage in the Kleczew brown coal mining areas has formed craters in the area.

In April 2008, five thousand people demonstrated in Kruszwica to protect cultural heritage and the nature reserve at Lake Gopło, against the Tomisławice opencast mine, which was due to open in 2009. This was the first protest of its kind in the country's history. Gopło Millennium Park (Nadgoplański Park Tysiąclecia) is protected by the European Union's Natura 2000 program and includes a major bird sanctuary.

== See also ==
- Coal mining
- Energy in Poland
