= Pospiech =

Pospiech or Pośpiech is a Polish surname. It may refer to:

- Margaret Pospiech, Polish writer and filmmaker
- Paweł Pośpiech (1879–1922), Polish priest, activist and journalist
