= Wodzisław Castle =

Wodzisław Castle Zamek w Wodzisławiu Śląskim
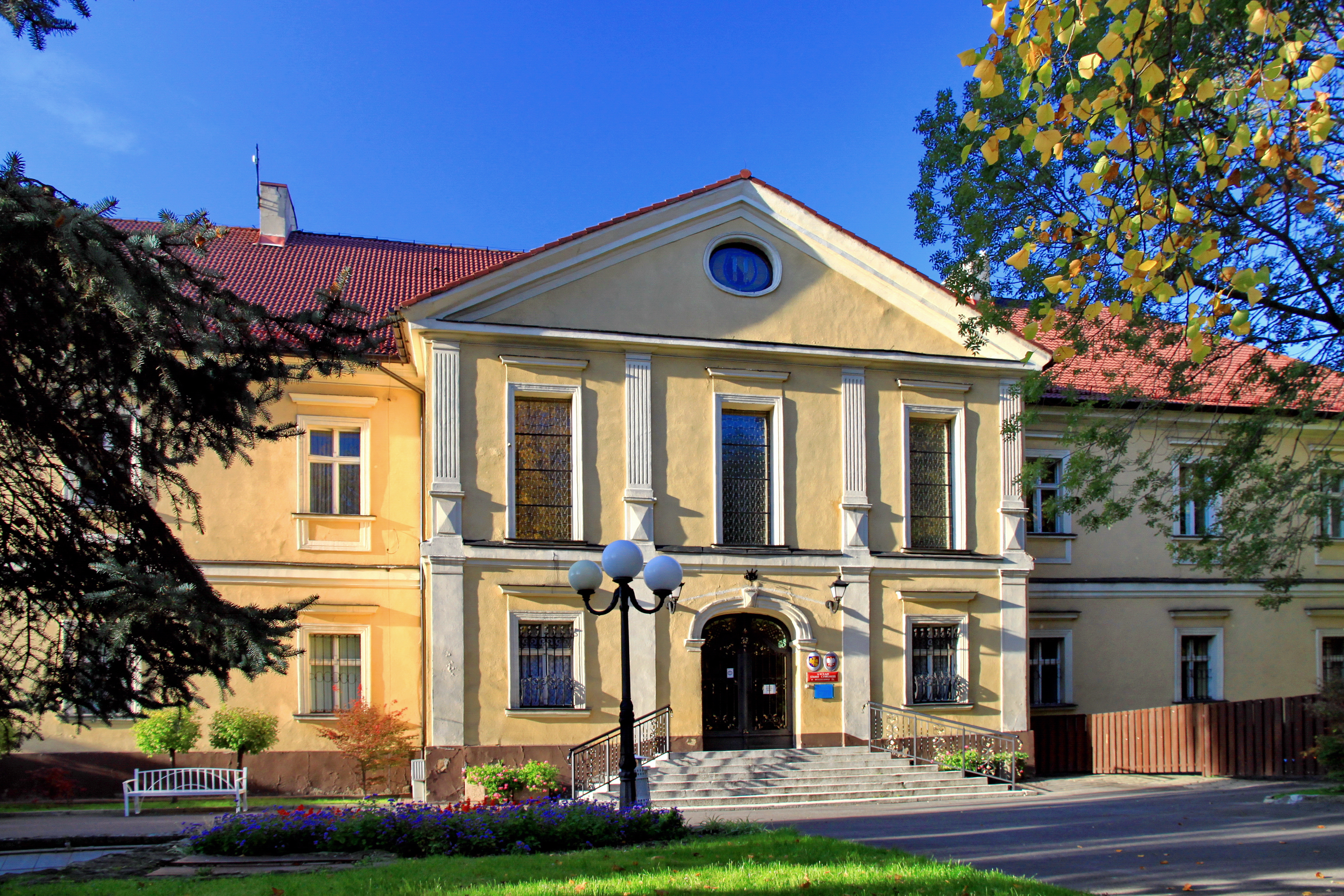
- Interactive map of the Wodzisław Castle; Zamek w Wodzisławiu Śląskim area

General information
- Architectural style: Classicism
- Location: Wodzisław Śląski, Poland
- Coordinates: 50°00′N 18°27′E
- Completed: 1745
- Owner: Museum in Wodzisław Śląski

Website
- Official Website (Polish)

The Wodzisław Castle (Polish: Zamek w Wodzisławiu Śląskim, German: Schloss Loslau) is a historic castle and palace located in the Wodzisław Śląski, in south Poland.

The old castle was built in the 13th century. The new residence Dietrichstein Palace (Polish: Pałac Dietrichsteinów) from 1745 is the oldest example of classicism architecture in Poland.

== See also ==
- Castles in Poland
