= Wilton Gregory =

American Catholic prelate (born 1947)

His Eminence Wilton Gregory
- Cardinal; Archbishop Emeritus of Washington
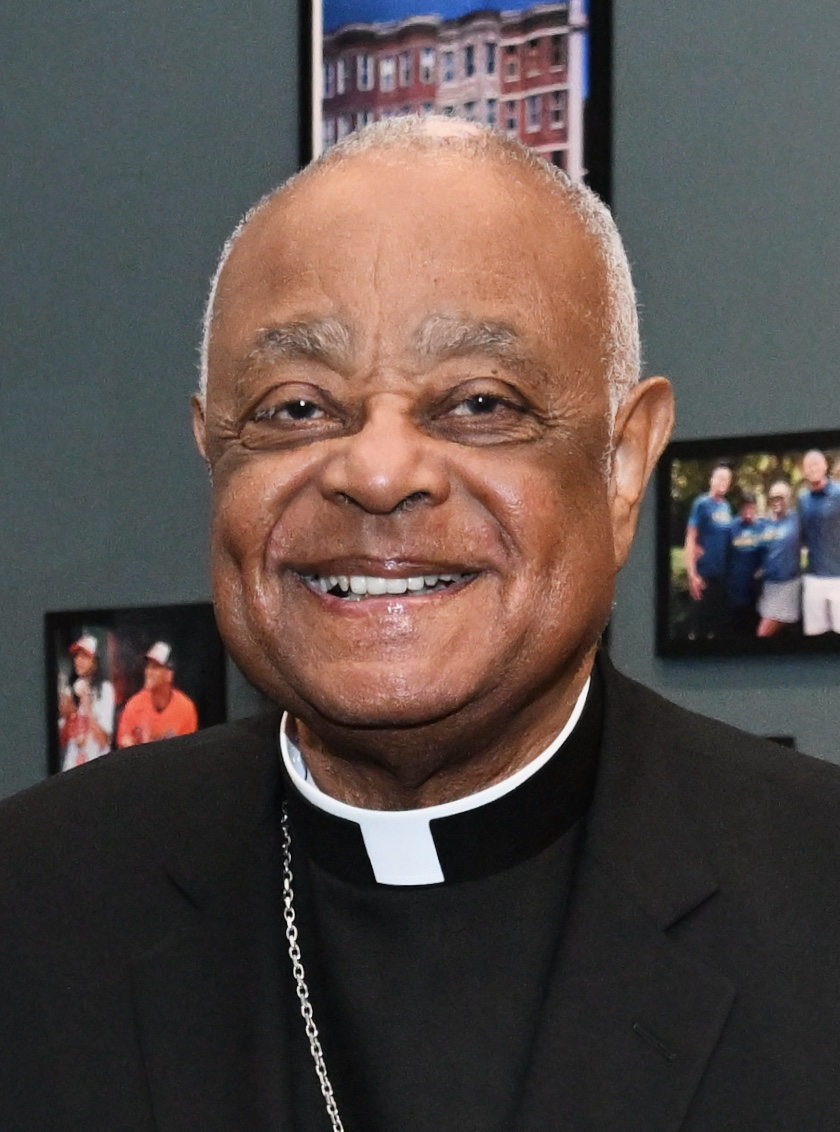
- Gregory in 2024
- Church: Catholic
- Archdiocese: Washington
- Appointed: April 4, 2019
- Installed: May 21, 2019
- Retired: January 6, 2025
- Predecessor: Donald William Wuerl
- Successor: Robert W. McElroy
- Other post: Cardinal-Priest of Immacolata Concezione di Maria a Grottarossa (2020-)
- Previous post: Auxiliary Bishop of Chicago and Titular Bishop of Oliva (1983–1993); Bishop of Belleville (1993–2004); Archbishop of Atlanta (2004–2019); Apostolic Administrator of Saint Thomas (2020-2021); Apostolic Administrator of Washington (2025)

Orders
- Ordination: May 9, 1973 by John Cody
- Consecration: December 13, 1983 by Joseph Bernardin
- Created cardinal: November 28, 2020 by Pope Francis
- Rank: Cardinal-Priest

Personal details
- Born: Wilton Daniel Gregory Jr. December 7, 1947 (age 78) Chicago, Illinois, U.S.
- Denomination: Catholic (Latin Church)
- Residence: Washington, D.C., U.S.
- Parents: Ethel Duncan; Wilton Gregory, Sr.
- Education: Niles College; University of St. Mary of the Lake; Pontifical Atheneum of St. Anselm
- Motto: We are the Lord's
- Styles
- Reference style: His Eminence; The Most Reverend Eminence
- Spoken style: Your Eminence
- Religious style: Cardinal
- Informal style: Cardinal

Wilton Daniel Gregory Jr. (born December 7, 1947) is an American Catholic prelate who served as Archbishop of Washington from 2019 to 2025. Pope Francis made him a cardinal in 2020, the first of African-American descent.

Gregory previously served as an auxiliary bishop of the Archdiocese of Chicago from 1983 to 1994; as Bishop of Belleville from 1994 to 2004; and as Archbishop of Atlanta from 2005 to 2019.

Gregory was the first African-American president of the United States Conference of Catholic Bishops (USCCB) from 2001 to 2004. He led the USCCB in issuing the "Charter for the Protection of Children and Young People" in response to the sexual abuse scandal in the American Catholic Church.

== Early life and education ==
Wilton Daniel Gregory Jr. was born on December 7, 1947, in Chicago, Illinois, to Ethel (née Duncan) and Wilton Gregory Sr. One of three children, he has two sisters: Elaine and Claudia. Gregory's parents divorced when he was young, and his grandmother, Etta Mae Duncan, subsequently moved in with the family at their home on the South Side of Chicago.

In 1958, Gregory was enrolled at St. Carthage Grammar School, a parochial school in Chicago. He later said that he decided then to become a priest, even though he was not a Catholic. At 11-years-old, Gregory was baptized and received his first communion in 1959, and was confirmed by Bishop Raymond Hillinger later that year.

After graduating from St. Carthage in 1961, Gregory attended Quigley Preparatory Seminary South, a minor seminary in Chicago. He then went to Niles College in Chicago and St. Mary of the Lake Seminary in Mundelein, Illinois.

== Ordination and ministry ==
At age 25, Gregory was ordained to the priesthood for the Archdiocese of Chicago on May 9, 1973. After his ordination, the archdiocese assigned him as an associate pastor at Our Lady of Perpetual Help Parish in Glenview, Illinois. In 1976, the archdiocese sent Gregory to Rome to begin graduate studies at the Pontifical Liturgical Institute at the Pontifical Athenaeum of St. Anselm. He completed his Doctor of Sacred Liturgy degree (SLD) there in 1980.

After returning to Illinois, Gregory was assigned to teach liturgy at Saint Mary of the Lake Seminary. He also served as a master of ceremonies under Cardinals John Cody and Joseph Bernardin.

== Episcopal ministry ==
=== Auxiliary bishop of Chicago ===
On October 31, 1983, Gregory was appointed by Pope John Paul II as an auxiliary bishop of Chicago and titular bishop of Oliva. At 35, he was the youngest bishop in the country. Gregory received his episcopal consecration on December 13, 1983, from Bernardin, with Bishops Alfred Abramowicz and Nevin Hayes serving as co-consecrators.

=== Bishop of Belleville ===
On December 29, 1993, John Paul II appointed Gregory as the seventh bishop of Belleville; he was installed on February 10, 1994.

In 1998, Gregory was elected as USCCB vice president and as the chair of several committees. Three years later, in 2001, he was elected as USCCB president, just the second African-American to head an episcopal conference. During Gregory's presidency, the USCCB issued the "Charter for the Protection of Children and Young People" in response to sex abuse cases by clergy. His term as USCCB president ended in 2004.

In 2002, in recognition of Gregory's handling of the sex abuse scandal, Time Magazine chose him as a Person of the Week.

=== Archbishop of Atlanta ===
Coat of arms as archbishop of Atlanta

John Paul II named Gregory as the seventh archbishop of Atlanta on December 9, 2004. His installation took place on January 17, 2005. He was the third African-American archbishop in the United States; the first two men, Eugene A. Marino and James P. Lyke, were also archbishops of Atlanta.

Gregory was active in the church in advocating for the prevention of child sexual abuse by Catholic clergy and religious, and for implementing policies to protect the faithful from sexual abuse. He had been one of the leading bishops in the United States regarding this endeavor. Gregory wrote a bi-weekly column for the archdiocesan newspaper, The Georgia Bulletin, entitled "What I have seen and heard". In it, he regularly shared reflections about his faith, work, and experiences.

In 2014, Gregory was criticized after the archdiocese used $2.2 million from a bequest to build a new archbishop's residence in the Buckhead section of Atlanta on church property. The archdiocese designed the residence to also serve as a banquet and conference facility. (Note: The Atlanta Archdiocese had received a $15 million bequest from the estate of Joseph Mitchell, a nephew of Gone with the Wind author Margaret Mitchell.) In March and April 2014, Gregory apologized to parishioners of the archdiocese, saying that he had:

failed to consider the impact on the families throughout the Archdiocese who, though struggling to pay their mortgages, utilities, tuition and other bills, faithfully respond year after year to my pleas to assist with funding our ministries and services.

Gregory ordered the archdiocese to sell the residence after living there only three months. In November 2014, the archdiocese sold the property for $2.6 million and Gregory moved into a $440,000 home in Smyrna, Georgia. At a 2017 conference at Boston College in Boston, Massachusetts, Gregory called Pope Francis's 2016 apostolic exhortation Amoris laetitia, on the pastoral love of families, as a:

...document that recognizes the real and serious problems and challenges facing families today, but at the same time it is a proclamation of hope through the mercy and grace of God.

Gregory said that Francis "challenges the church and its pastors to move beyond thinking that everything is black and white, so that we sometimes close off the way of grace and growth." In 2018, a group of Catholics petitioned Gregory to remove Monsignor Henry Gracz from the Shrine of the Immaculate Conception in Atlanta for allegedly contravening Catholic teaching. Gracz served there as a spiritual advisor to victims of sexual abuse. Gregory refused to remove him, saying,

Msgr. Gracz is following the admonition of Pope Francis to accompany people on the periphery of society. His priestly heart is not closed to those who find themselves misunderstood or rejected.

=== Archbishop of Washington ===
Coat of arms as archbishop of Washington

On April 4, 2019, Pope Francis named Gregory as archbishop of Washington. He was installed on May 21, 2019. In an August 2019 interview with Crux Magazine, Gregory criticized rhetoric from President Donald Trump, saying, "I fear that recent public comments by our president and others and the responses they have generated, have deepened divisions and diminished our national life"; he called for an "end" to "the growing plague of offense and disrespect in speech and actions."

In June 2020, Trump visited the Saint John Paul II National Shrine in Washington. Before the visit, police forcibly dispersed a group of protestors

in front of the shrine. During that visit, held to promote an executive order on religious freedom, Trump and First Lady Melania Trump stood in front of the statue of John Paul II for a photo opportunity for journalists. Along with other religious leaders, Gregory immediately condemned the visit, saying,

I find it baffling and reprehensible that any Catholic facility would allow itself to be so egregiously misused and manipulated in a fashion that violates our religious principles, which call us to defend the rights of all people even those with whom we might disagree… Saint Pope John Paul II was an ardent defender of the rights and dignity of human beings. His legacy bears vivid witness to that truth. He certainly would not condone the use of tear gas and other deterrents to silence, scatter or intimidate them for a photo opportunity in front of a place of worship and peace.

The National Catholic Register subsequently reported that the White House had privately invited Gregory to the National Shrine event. Gregory had declined the invitation, citing a prior commitment.

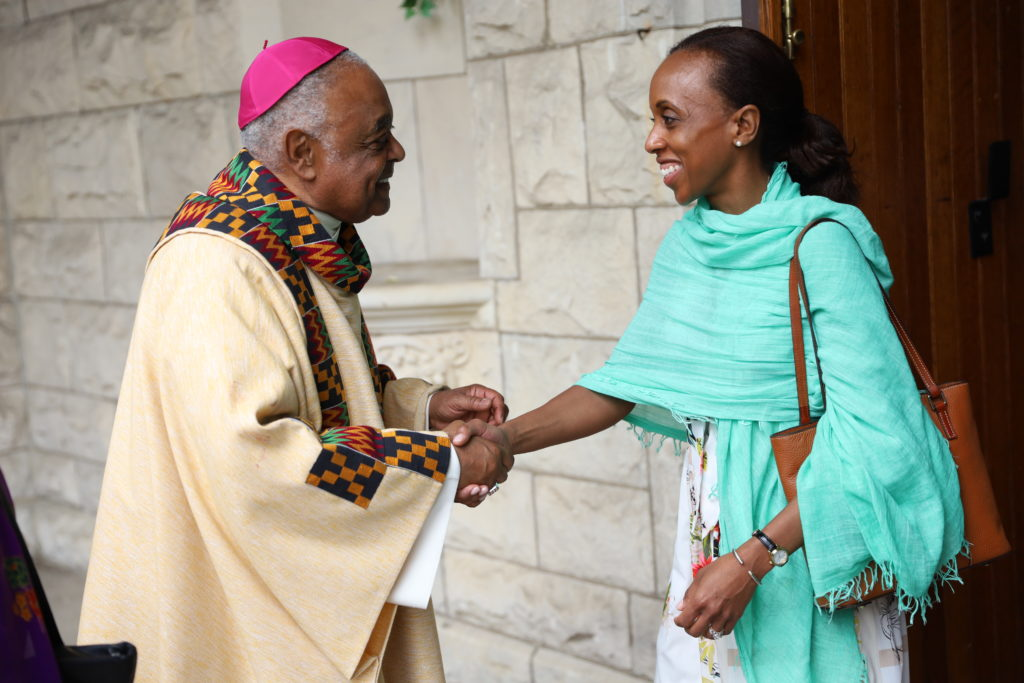
Archbishop Gregory at St. Augustine Church in Washington, D.C. (2019)

In September 2020, Francis appointed Gregory to serve as the apostolic administrator for the Diocese of Saint Thomas, a suffragan diocese of Washington. Gregory would deliver the invocation at the ceremony memorializing victims of the coronavirus pandemic prior to Vice President Joe Biden's inauguration as president. Like his predecessors, as archbishop of Washington, Gregory served as the chancellor of Catholic University of America.

Following the release of Traditionis custodes, which severely restricted the use of the Extraordinary Form of the Roman Rite, Gregory promulgated new liturgical norms in accordance with the motu proprio. He restricted celebrations of the extraordinary form in the archdiocese, to three locations. He also prohibited these celebrations during Christmas, the Easter Triduum, Easter Sunday and Pentecost Sunday, as well as prohibiting the celebration of other sacraments in that form. These restrictions upset some Catholics who had become attached to the Extraordinary Form.

Pope Francis accepted Gregory's resignation as archbishop of Washington on January 6, 2025, and named Cardinal Robert McElroy from the Diocese of San Diego to succeed him.

=== Elevation to cardinal ===
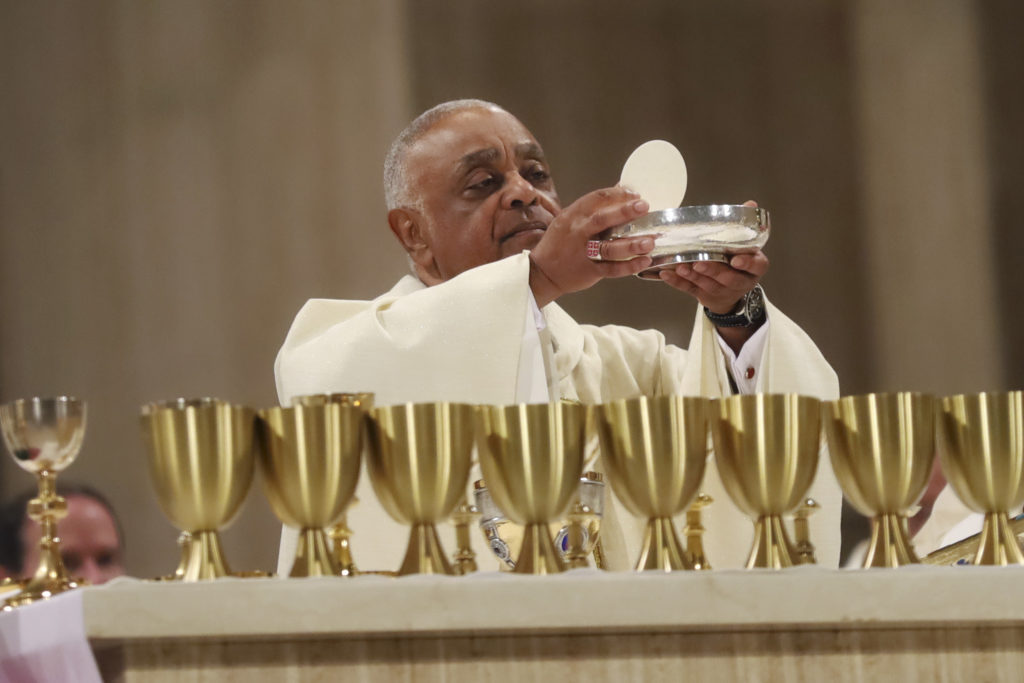
Archbishop Gregory celebrates Mass at the Basilica of the National Shrine of the Immaculate Conception (2019).

On October 25, 2020, Francis announced he would raise Gregory to the rank of cardinal at the consistory of November 28, 2020. At that consistory, Francis created him a cardinal-priest, with the titular church of Immacolata Concezione di Maria a Grottarossa in Rome. Gregory became the first African-American cardinal in history. In December 2020, Francis named Gregory as a member of the Dicastery for the Laity, Family and Life at the Vatican. Gregory participated as a cardinal elector in the 2025 papal conclave that elected Pope Leo XIV.

== Viewpoints ==
=== Abortion ===
After the November 2020 US election of Joe Biden as president, Gregory emphasized the need to "engage and dialogue" with the new administration. He noted a "clear divergence of opinions" with Biden on abortion rights for women, but a closer alignment of views with him on the "respect for the dignity of our immigrant community", on an "end to capital punishment", and "the pursuit of racial and social justice".

Gregory said he was "not going to veer" from the long-established practice of allowing Biden, a Catholic, to receive the eucharist. When asked why, Gregory said, "I don't want to go to the table with a gun on the table first."

=== Gun control ===
Gregory spoke out against the 2014 Safe Carry Protection Act, passed by the Georgia General Assembly. The new law permitted licensed gun owners to carry guns in churches and other public places. After the law passed, Gregory stated he would not allow guns in archdiocesan churches, except for those required by the military and police. He stated that guns in churches placed vulnerable individuals, such as children, the disabled, and the elderly, at risk. Furthermore, guns in church contravened Jesus' teachings of peace,"

Rather than make guns more available as a solution, we need leaders in government and society who will speak against violence in all aspects of life and who teach ways of reconciliation and peace and who make justice, not vengeance, our goal.

=== LGBTQ relations ===
In 2003, Gregory criticized the 2003 US Supreme Court decision on Lawrence v. Texas that declared laws criminalizing sodomy between consenting adults were unconstitutional. When asked in 2019 by a transgender person about whether the Catholic Church had a place for them, Gregory responded:

You belong to the heart of this Church. And there is nothing that you may do, may say, that will ever rip you from the heart of this Church. There is a lot that has been said to you, about you, behind your back, that is painful and is sinful. And so that's why I mentioned my conversations with Fortunate Families. We have to find a way to talk to one another. And to talk to one another, not just from one perspective, but to talk and to listen to one another. I think that's the way that Jesus ministered. He engaged people, he took them where they were at, and He invited them to go deeper, closer to God. So if you're asking me where do you fit? You fit in the family.

In October 2020, Gregory was interviewed in an Associated Press article that noted, "Gregory has drawn notice for his relatively inclusive approach for LGBTQ Catholics, and said it was essential that they be treated with respect."

== Honors ==
- Honorary doctorates from Spring Hill College in Mobile, Xavier University in Cincinnati, McKendree University, Lewis University, Fontbonne University, Catholic Theological Union in Chicago, and Boston College in 2018
- The Great Preacher Award from the Aquinas Institute of Theology in St. Louis, Missouri, in 2002
- Induction into the Martin Luther King Jr. Board of Preachers at Morehouse College in Atlanta in 2006

== See also ==
- Cardinals created by Pope Francis
- Catholic Church hierarchy
- Catholic Church in the United States
- Historical list of the Catholic bishops of the United States
- List of Catholic bishops of the United States
- Lists of patriarchs, archbishops, and bishops

== Notes ==
Catholic Church titles
Preceded by James Patrick Keleher	Bishop of Belleville; 1994–2004	Succeeded by Edward Kenneth Braxton
Preceded by Joseph Fiorenza	President of the United States Conference of Catholic Bishops; 2001–2004	Succeeded by William S. Skylstad
Preceded by John Francis Donoghue	Archbishop of Atlanta; 2005–2019	Succeeded by Gregory John Hartmayer
Preceded by Donald William Wuerl	Archbishop of Washington; 2019–2025	Succeeded by Robert W. McElroy
Preceded by Henryk Gulbinowicz	Cardinal-Priest of Immacolata Concezione di Maria a Grottarossa; 2020–present	Incumbent
