= Radlin II =

- District of Wodzisław Śląski
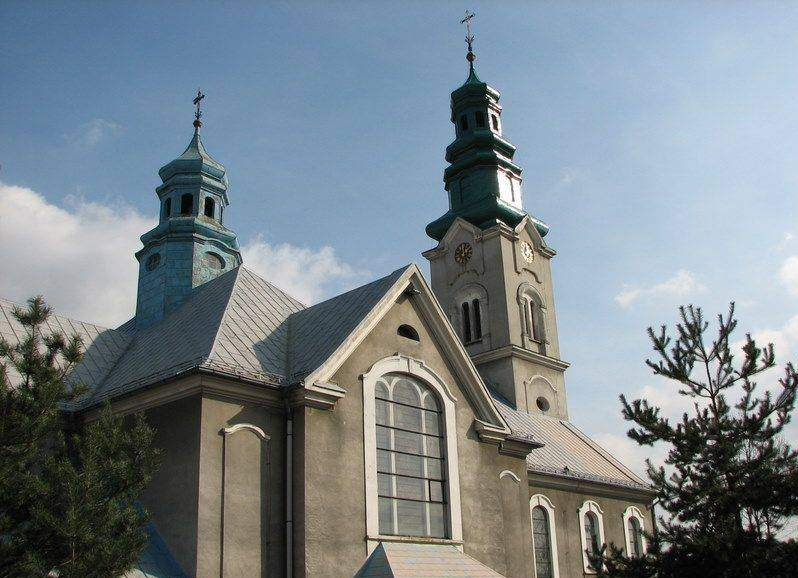
- Parish Church of St. Mary Magdalene in Radlin II
- Interactive map of Radlin II
- Coordinates: 50°01′31″N 18°27′10″E
- Country: Poland
- Voivodeship: Silesian
- Powiat: Wodzisław County
- Town: Wodzisław Śląski

Population (2006)
  - Total: 5,500
- Time zone: UTC+1
- Website: www.ospradlin2.com.pl

Radlin II (Radlin the Second) is a district of Wodzisław Śląski.

It is a suburban district, the historical part of Radlin, or Radlin proper. After administrative changes, it became part of Wodzisław Śląski.

Parts of national road No. 78 and railway line No. 158 with the Wodzisław Śląski Radlin stop run through Radlin II. The Lesznica River has its source in the district. Since 1907, the "OSP Radlin 2" unit has been operating in the district. There are also two Roman Catholic churches, dedicated to St. Mary Magdalene (Dolniok) and St. Isidore (Górniok).

The district consists of the former towns Radlin Górny, Radlin Dolny, Szarowiec, merged in the nineteenth century into the village of Radlin. The district has about 5500 inhabitants. The present town of Radlin is called "Radlin", despite the fact that it lies in the former villages of Biertułtowy, Głożyny and Obszary, which were formerly districts of Radlin (today called Radlin the Second).

From 1922 to 1939 and from 1945 to 1954 it was the seat of the Radlin gmina.

Bolesław Kominek, a Polish Catholic priest and cardinal, was born in Radlin in 1903.

== History ==
Radlin is an old town, but few mentions of it have survived in chronicles or in official records. Its name is probably derived from the word "radło" in the sense of a plow, or part of it, which indicates the agricultural character of the village. From the period of Tatar invasions in 1241, there is a legend according to which the Radlin peasants freed the prince besieged by the Tatars in the Wodzisław castle, for which he raised his rescuers to the nobility. The first mention of Radlin comes from 1365 and is included in the old deed of sale of the unknown Konrad von Radlin. He was the owner of all or part of Radlin, and after him the village passed into the hands of Plankuar, later Sednitzki. From 1602, the owner was Jerzy Charwat Plawetzki from Plawecz, while Radlin Górny without Szonowice belonged to the owner of Wodzisław, becoming part of the Wodzisławskie state country. Radlin also owned Obszary along with the so-called Pogwizdow. The first mention of them comes from 1696. They are known as Romanshof, after the Prussian landlord Roman, who owned quite extensive areas.

Radlin developed quite slowly. In 1783, it was inhabited by 51 settlers, 13 homesteaders and had only 279 inhabitants. Radlin Dolny belonged to the knightly estate for a long time, and in 1804 it belonged to the knight's estate. It passed into the hands of the owners of Wodzisław, because the Count of Wodzisław bought the entire Lower Radlin and part of the so-called Upper Szonowiec.

A longer note about this town can be found in documents from the late nineteenth century, more precisely in the records of Franiczek Henke, a historian of the Racibórz-Wodzisław region, who states that Radlin is one of the largest villages of the Rybnik powiat and consists of Radlin Górny, Dolny and Obszary. Henke reports that there were 51 farms in Radlin Górny, and as a result of parceling, the number of them increased to 70, but their usable area had significantly decreased. In addition, there were 89 cottagers, 2 water mills, 183 houses inhabited by 2190 inhabitants, including 11 Evangelicals and 2 Jews. The rest were Catholics.

The main center of activity was located in Radlin Dolny, where there was a primary school and a church – a branch of the Wodzisław parish, where the parish priest was Fr. Reszka. Until 1870 there was no obligation to attend school in these areas. Interested residents, e.g. from Obszary, sent their children to a school located in Radlin Dolny. In 1904, the parish in Radlin was separated from the parish of Wodzisław. In 1929, a new brick church of St. Mary Magdalene in Radlin was built. In the 1930s, Biertułtowy was incorporated into Radlin.

In 1975, Radlin was incorporated into Wodzisław Śląski. In 1997, Biertułtowy, Głożyny and Obszary separated from Wodzisław and formed the town of Radlin. However, as a result of the decision of the residents, the historic Radlin remained a district of Wodzisław. To distinguish it from the city of Radlin, it began to be called Radlin the Second.

== Streets ==
- Bojowników
- Bolesława Chrobrego
- Dąbrowskiego
- Dębowa
- Gołębia
- Głożyńska
- ks. Kominka
- Krupińskiego
- Kokoszycka
- Kosynierów
- Letnia
- Owocowa
- Pogodna
- Popiela
- Radlińska
- Radlińskie Chałupki
- rondo Św. Floriana
- Rybnicka
- Skłodowskiej-Curie
- Ustronna
- Wańkowicza
- Więźniów Politycznych
- Wysoka
- Zbożowa
- Ziemowita
- Ziołowa
- Zuchów
- Żniwna
- Żwirowa

== Gallery ==
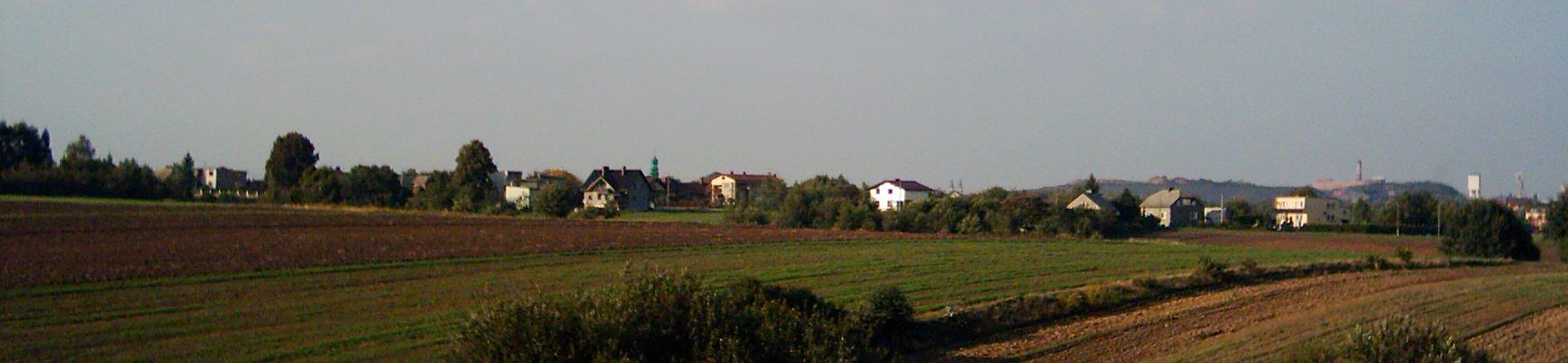
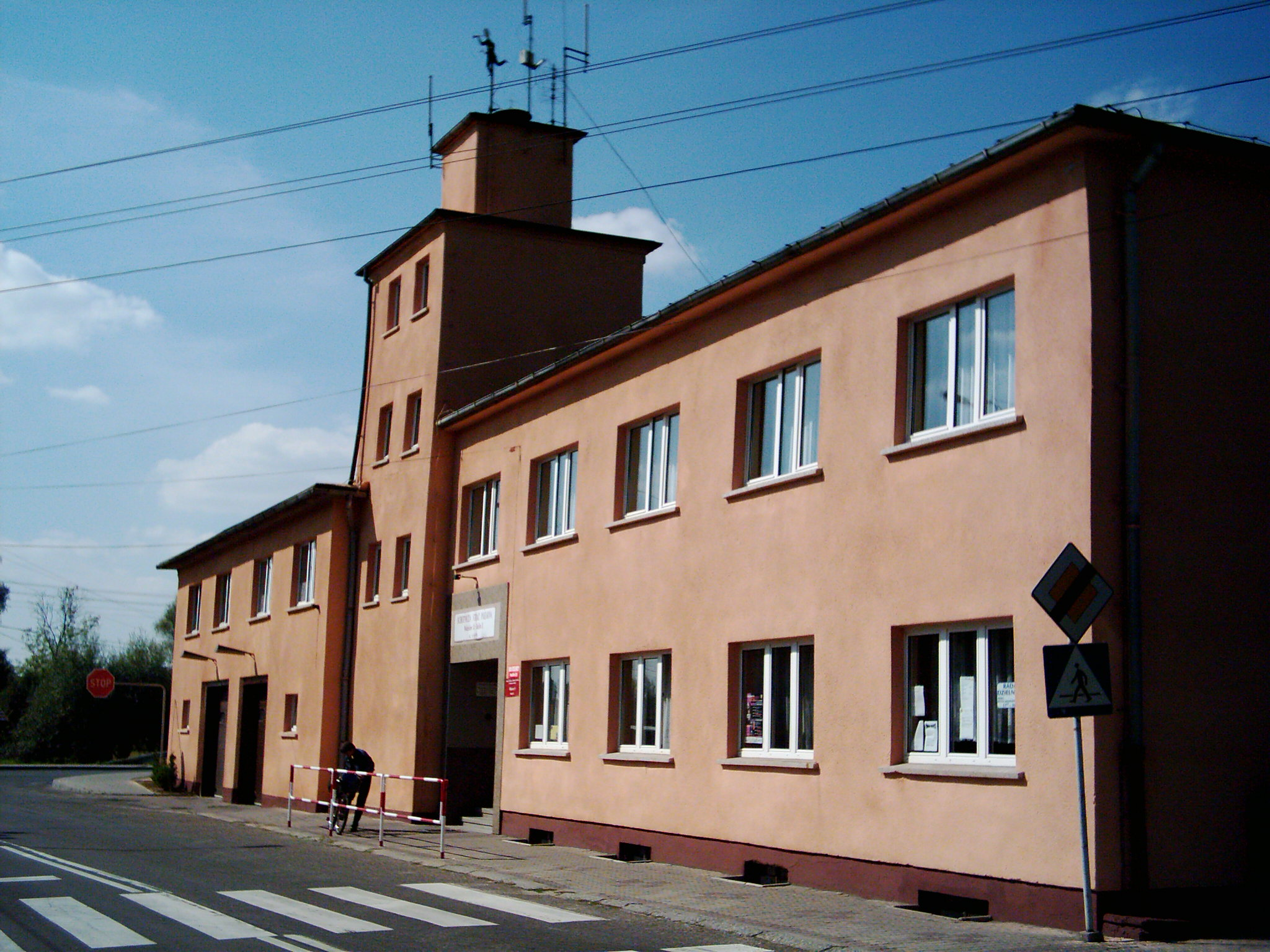
Radlin II Fire Station

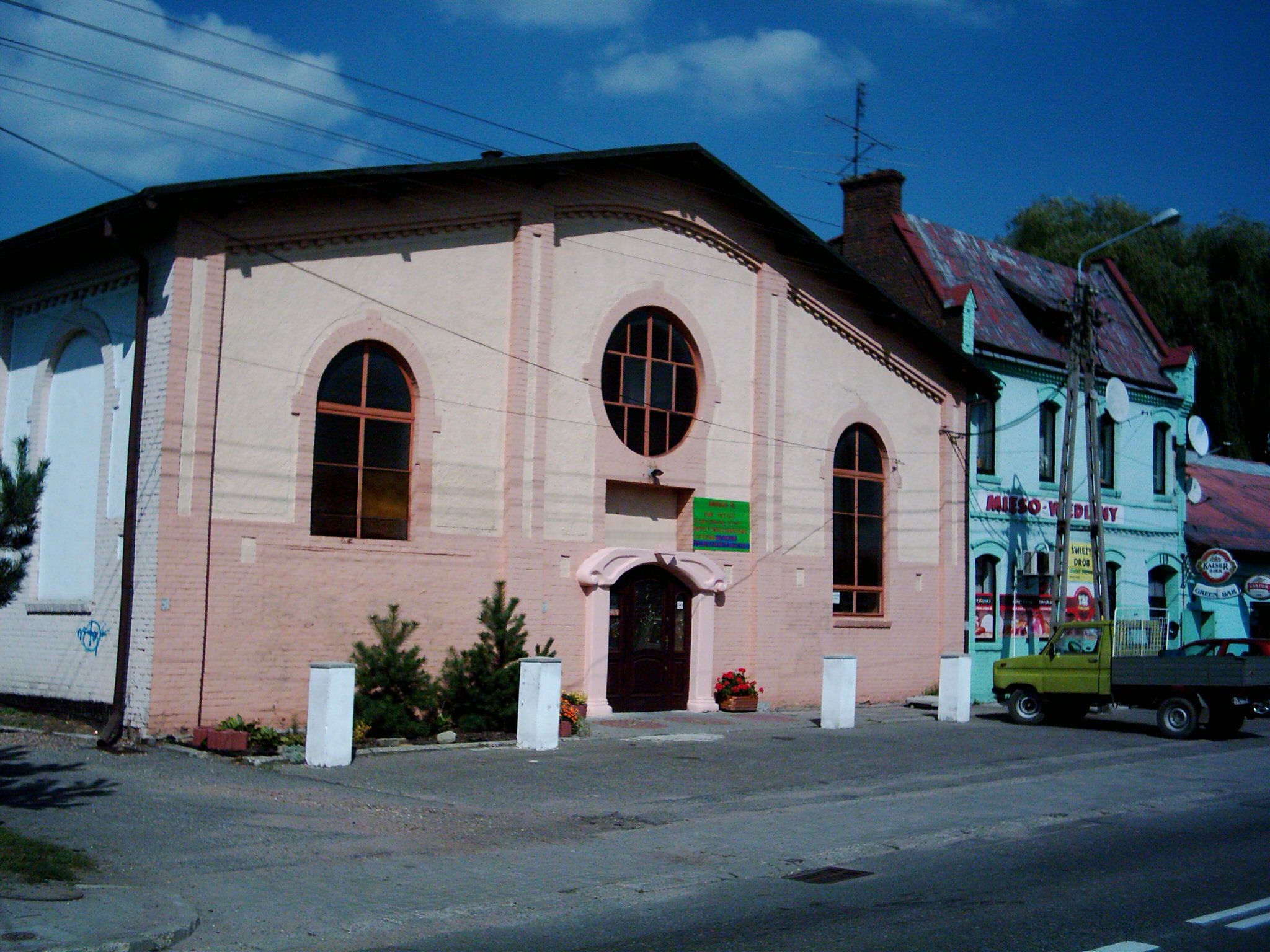
Historic inn in Radlin II, Wodzisław Śląski

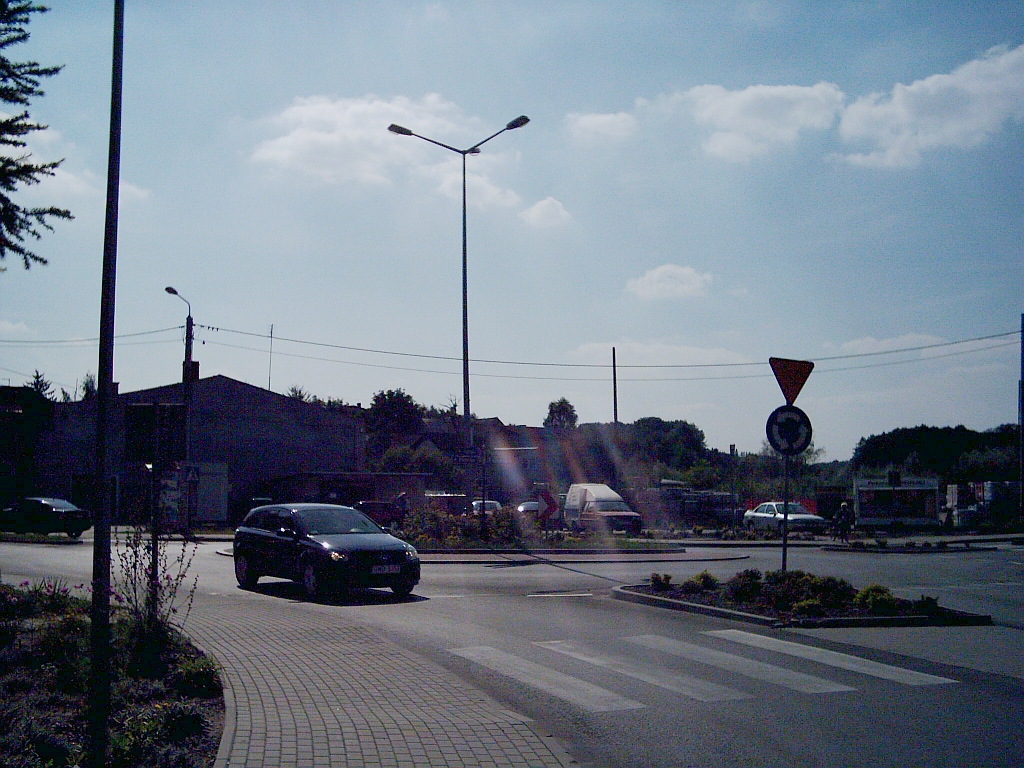
St. Florian's roundabout – Radlin II Center

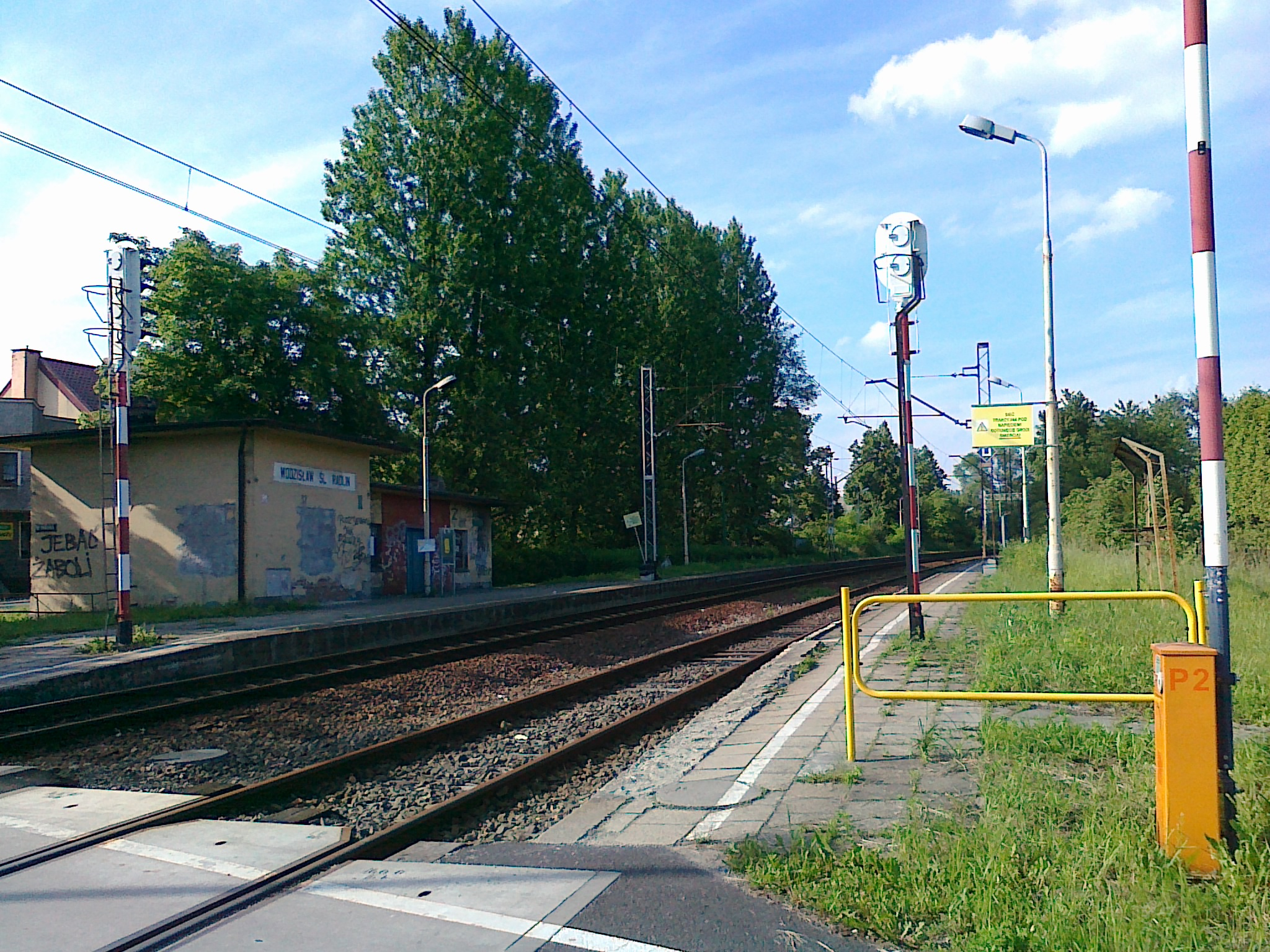
Wodzisław Śląski Radlin railway station

== People ==
- Bolesław Kominek, Archbishop of Wrocław, was born in Radlin II.
- Tomasz Sikora, silver medalist in biathlon at the 2006 Winter Olympics in Turin, was born in Wodzisław Śląski and lives in Radlin II.
- Jerzy Wójcik, a Polish Olympic fencer, was born in Radlin II.
