= Immacolata Concezione di Maria a Grottarossa =

Santa Maria Immacolata Concezione a Grottarossa
- Immaculate Conception of Mary at Grottarossa (in English); Immaculatæ Conceptionis Mariæ ad Saxa Rubra (in Latin)
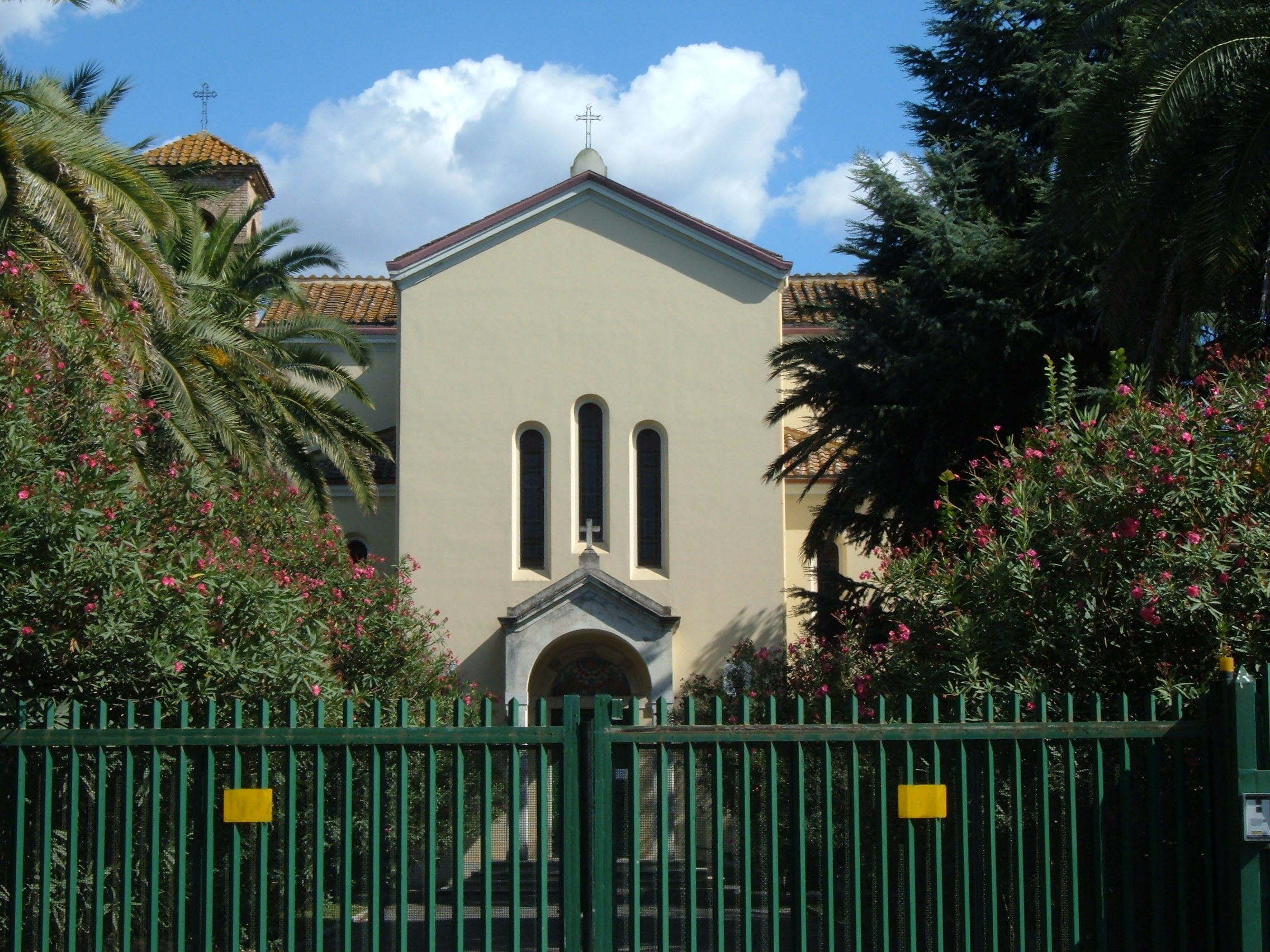
- Facade
- Click on the map for a fullscreen view
- 41°57′44″N 12°29′17″E
- Location: Via Flaminia, Rome
- Country: Italy
- Denomination: Roman Catholic
- Tradition: Roman Rite
- Website: Official website

History
- Status: Titular church
- Dedication: Mary, mother of Jesus
- Consecrated: 1937

Architecture
- Architect: Ettore Molinario
- Architectural type: Church
- Groundbreaking: 1935
- Completed: 1937

Administration
- District: Lazio
- Province: Rome

Santa Maria Immacolata Concezione a Grottarossa is a Catholic church in Rome's Grottarossa area, along the ancient Via Flaminia. It has been under the titular possession of Wilton Gregory of Washington since his elevation to the cardinalate in 2020.

== History ==
It was built in 1935 by Ettore Molinario to meet the spiritual needs of all the workers of the former farm that has given rise to Grottarossa village. It is set along Via Flaminia, "to Saxa Rubra", where, in the year 312, there was the historic battle between the armies of Constantine I and Maxentius. On 2 November 1986, the church received the visit of John Paul II, who at that time solemnly crowned a new image of Our Lady Immaculate. The church is home to the parish, which was established on June 4, 1937. It also is home to the cardinal's title of "Immaculate Conception of Mary in Grottarossa", instituted by Pope John Paul II May 5, 1985 by Papal Bull Purpuratis Patribus.

== Cardinal Priest ==
Pope John Paul II established it as a titular church on 25 May 1985.

- Henryk Gulbinowicz, 25 May 1985 – 16 November 2020
- Wilton Gregory, 28 November 2020 – present
