= Bolesław Kominek =

Polish cardinal (1903-1974)

His Eminence Bolesław Kominek
- Cardinal, Archbishop of Wrocław
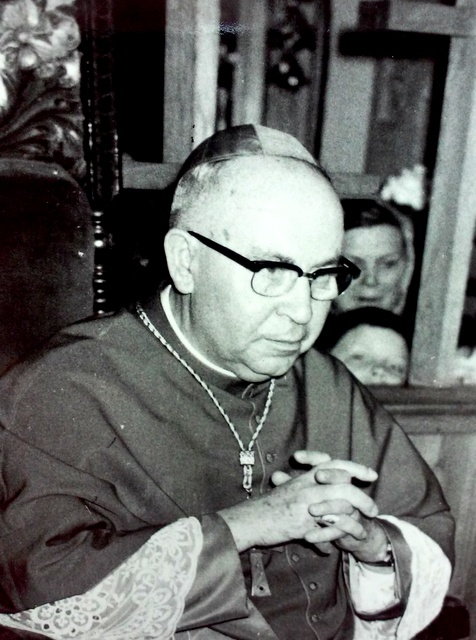
- The cardinal in the Saint Peter and Paul parish on 20 May 1973.
- Church: Roman Catholic Church
- Appointed: 28 June 1972
- Term ended: 10 March 1974
- Predecessor: Adolf Bertram
- Successor: Henryk Roman Gulbinowicz
- Other posts: Vice-President of the Council of European Bishops' Conferences (1972-74); Cardinal-Priest of Santa Croce in Via Flaminia (1973-74)
- Previous posts: Apostolic Administrator of Upper Silesia (1945-51); Titular Bishop of Sophene (1951-53); Titular Bishop of Vaga (1956-62); Titular Archbishop of Euchaitae (1962-72)

Orders
- Ordination: 11 September 1927 by Arkadiusz Lisiecki
- Consecration: 10 October 1954 by Franciszek Barda
- Created cardinal: 5 March 1973 by Pope Paul VI
- Rank: Cardinal-priest

Personal details
- Born: Bolesław Kominek; 23 December 1903 Radlin II, Wodzisław Śląski, German Empire
- Died: 10 March 1974 (aged 70) Wrocław, Poland
- Education: Jagiellonian University; Institut Catholique de Paris
- Motto: Virtus verbum crucis Dei
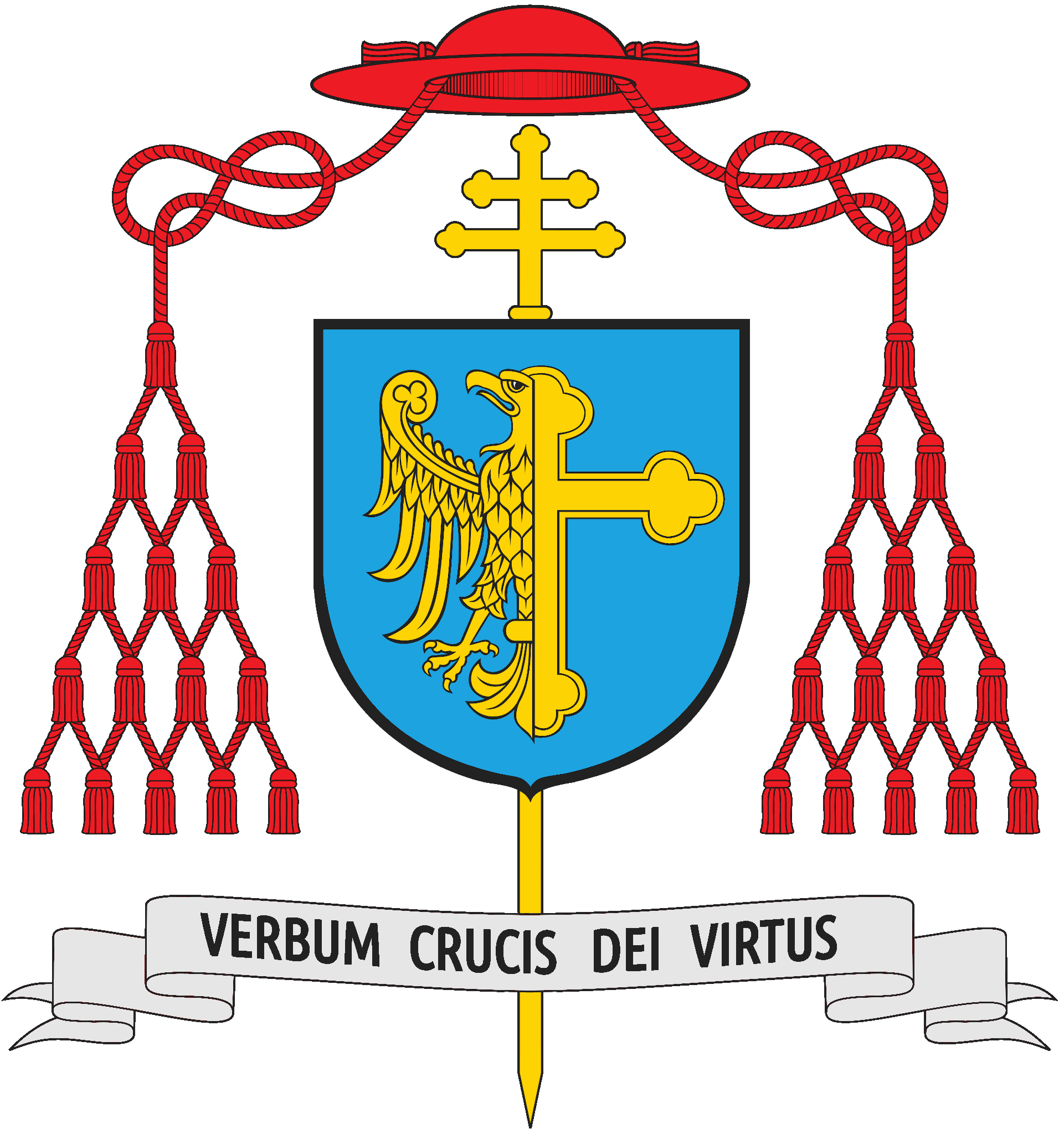
- Coat of arms

Styles of Bolesław Kominek
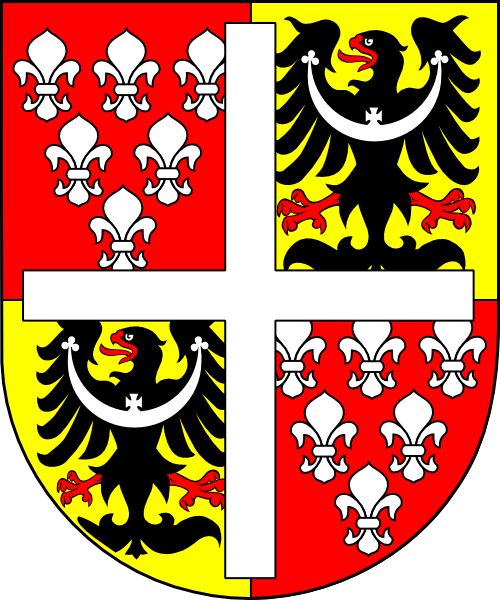
- Reference style: His Eminence
- Spoken style: Your Eminence
- Informal style: Cardinal
- See: Wrocław

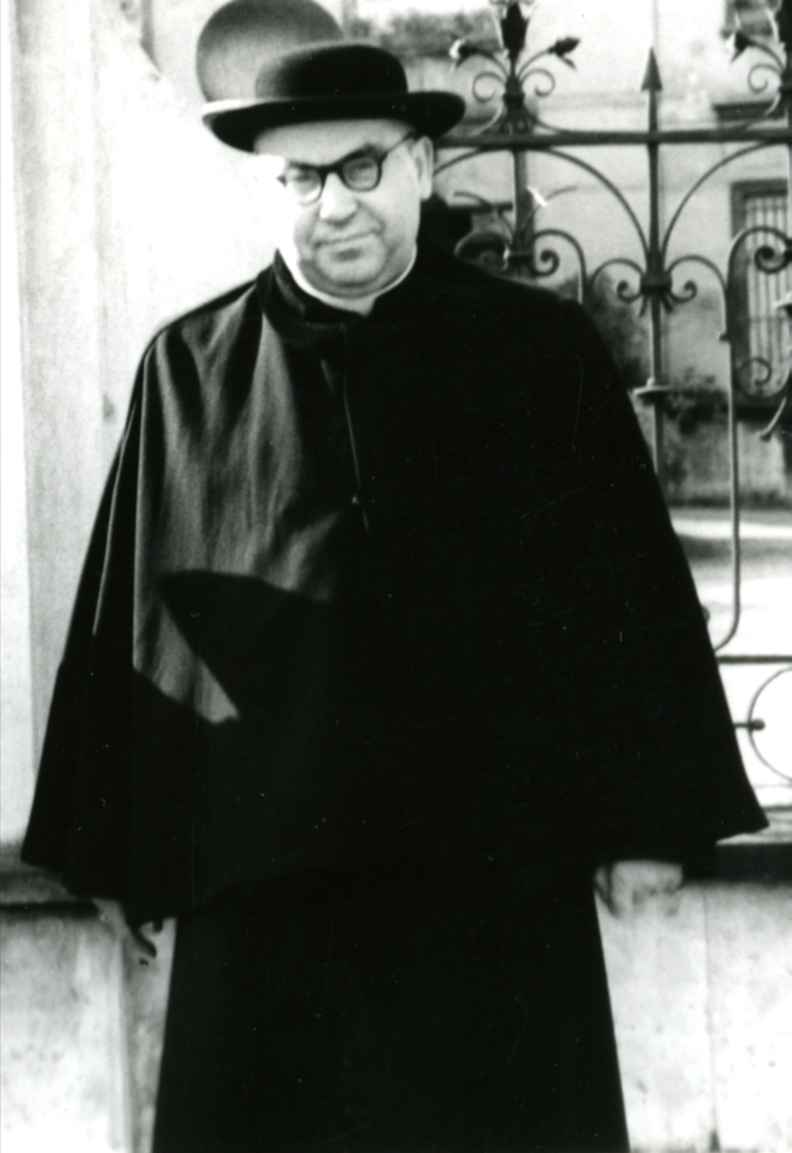
Bolesław Kominek

Bolesław Kominek (23 December 1903 – 10 March 1974) was a Polish cardinal of the Roman Catholic Church. He served as Archbishop of Wrocław from 1972 until his death, and was elevated to the cardinalate in 1973.

== Biography ==
Bolesław Kominek was born in Radlin II, Wodzisław Śląski, German Empire, to Franciszek, a miner, and Kataryna (née Kozielskich) Kominek. Studying at the gymnasium of Rybnik, and at the Catholic University of Kraków, he received the subdiaconate in 1926 from Cardinal August Hlond, S.D.B., and the diaconate in 1926 from Bishop Arkadiusz Lisiecki.

He was ordained to the priesthood by the same Bishop Lisiecki on 11 September 1927 in Katowice (Autonomous Silesian Voivodeship, Poland), and then furthered his studies at the Catholic Institute of Paris and did pastoral work among the Polish immigrants in Paris until 1930. Kominek did pastoral work in the Diocese of Katowice from 1930 to 1939, and with Polish fugitives during World War II until 1945, serving in Lublin, Katowice, and Upper Silesia.

With the unilateral shifting westward of the border between Poland and Germany, most of the archdiocese of Wrocław/Breslau was now within Poland, but smaller parts were in East Germany and Czechoslovakia. Until the matter was eased by a treaty between West Germany, claiming succession of pre-1945 Germany, and the People's Republic of Poland, the Holy See could not endorse the alteration of the border by reorganizing the identities and boundaries of dioceses untried. It continued therefore to recognize as vicar capitular of the archdiocese Father Ferdinand Piontek (1878–1963), a Polish-speaking German priest who had been elected after the death of Cardinal Adolf Bertram on 6 July 1945.

Cardinal Hlond, on the basis of special faculties granted to him but that in reality did not apply to the former German territories, required Piontek to resign from his position of vicar general of the territory east of the new border. On 28 February 1946 Pope Pius XII granted Piontek, when still residing in Wrocław, the rights of a residing bishop. Piontek was expelled from Poland to the British zone of occupation on 9 July, however, he could return to the archdiocese in March 1947, then taking office at the new ordinariate in East German Görlitz, built up since September 1945.

On 15 August 1945 Hlond appointed administrators for the three sections into which he divided the Polish archdiocesan territory with effect of 1 September. Kominek was the administrator whom he appointed for the area of Opole, an appointment that was not recognized by the Holy See. Kominek's ministry there was, in any case, interrupted on 26 January 1951 by the Polish Communist regime.

Soon after, on 26 April 1951, Pope Pius XII appointed Kominek titular bishop of Sophene and "Pastoral Representative" with residence in Wrocław. However, the Communist regime forbade him taking up residence there and from being consecrated. Nevertheless, Kominek was secretly consecrated as bishop on 10 October 1954 at the hands of Bishop Franciszek Barda, with Bishops Franciszek Jop and Wojciech Tomaka serving as co-consecrators. The consecration was kept secret until 1956, when he could finally move to Wrocław and was appointed on 1 December titular Bishop of Vaga. On 19 March 1962 he was raised in rank by being named titular Archbishop of Euchaitae and on 25 May 1962 was appointed apostolic administrator ad nutum Sanctae Sedis. On 28 September 1958, he and Bishop Jop were co-consecrators at the episcopal consecration by Archbishop Eugeniusz Baziak of Karol Wojtyla, the future Pope John Paul II, as an auxiliary bishop of the Archdiocese of Krakow.

Between 1962 and 1965, he attended sessions of the Second Vatican Council. It was there on 18 November 1965, during the end of deliberations, that the "Message of Polish Bishops to their German brothers" was delivered. This "Message of Reconciliation" was initiated by Archbishop Kominek and he was one of its foremost co-authors, along with Karol Wojtyla and others. This preamble to open dialogue ended, "In this general Christian and at the same time very humane spirit, we stretch out our hands to you from the benches of the ending Council, we forgive and ask for forgiveness. If you – the German bishops and the fathers of the Council – take our brotherly hands out in fraternity, then we will be able to celebrate our Millennium in a completely Christian way with a clear conscience. We cordially invite you to Poland."

This outreach angered the Communist hierarchy in Poland who claimed that among other things it interfered with the foreign policy of the state. It provoked verbal attacks on the Church by First Secretary Gomułka. Throughout the country the communist authorities unleashed a propaganda campaign against the episcopate and personally against Stefan Wyszyński, the Primate of Poland.

Church historians, such as Józef Pater, recognized the contribution of Cardinal Kominek to the normalization of diplomatic relations between Poland and Germany, which was finalized in the 1970 "Warsaw Agreement" which enabled stabilization of church organization in the western and northern reaches of Poland.

In June 1966, Życie Warszawy called for the replacement of Cardinal Stefan Wyszyński by Kominek. Kominek responded by stating, "On questions of the existence of the Church, we [the hierarchy] are always together".

On 28 June 1972 in response to the "Warsaw Agreement", Pope Paul VI appointed Kominek the second Archbishop of Wrocław. In the consistory of 5 March 1973, he made him cardinal priest of Santa Croce in Via Flaminia.

One year later, Cardinal Kominek died in Wrocław, at the age of 70. He is buried at the Wrocław Cathedral.

In 2005 a statue was erected to him in Wrocław. It is located on Piaskowa Island near the Tumski Bridge, at the entrance to Ostrów Tumski.

Catholic Church titles
Vacant Title last held by Adolf Bertram; 1945–1972 sede vacante	Archbishop of Wrocław; 1972–1974	Vacant Title next held by Henryk Gulbinowicz; 1974–1976 sede vacante
