= Henryk Gulbinowicz =

Catholic cardinal

His Eminence Henryk Roman Gulbinowicz
- Cardinal, Archbishop Emeritus of Wrocław
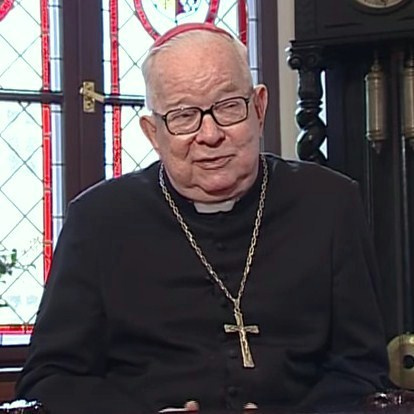
- Church: Catholic Church
- Archdiocese: Wrocław
- Appointed: 3 January 1976
- Term ended: 3 April 2004
- Predecessor: Bolesław Kominek
- Successor: Marian Gołębiewski
- Other post: Cardinal-Priest of Immacolata Concezione di Maria a Grottarossa
- Previous posts: Apostolic Administrator of Vilnius (1970–1976); Titular Bishop of Acci (1970–1976)

Orders
- Ordination: 18 June 1950 by Romuald Jałbrzykowski
- Consecration: 8 February 1970 by Stefan Wyszyński
- Created cardinal: 25 May 1985 by John Paul II
- Rank: Cardinal-Priest

Personal details
- Born: 17 October 1923 Wilno, Poland
- Died: 16 November 2020 (aged 97) Wrocław, Poland
- Denomination: Roman Catholic
- Motto: Patientia et Caritas (Patience and Love)
- Coat of arms

Henryk Roman Gulbinowicz (17 October 1923 – 16 November 2020) was a prelate of the Catholic Church who served as Archbishop of Wrocław from 1976 to 2004. Pope John Paul II made him a cardinal in 1985. In 2020, he was banned from making public appearances following a Holy See investigation that confirmed allegations that he had committed sexual abuse and evidence that he had been a secret police informant from 1969 to 1985. Following his death, Gulbinowicz was forbidden to have his funeral service at the city’s Cathedral of St. John the Baptist or to be buried in the cathedral.

Styles of Henryk Gulbinowicz
- Reference style: His Eminence
- Spoken style: Your Eminence
- Informal style: Cardinal
- See: Wrocław

== Biography ==
=== Early life and priesthood ===
Henryk Roman Gulbinowicz was born on 17 October 1923 in Wilno, Poland (now Vilnius, Lithuania). He grew up in Szukiszki (Šukiškės). He entered the archdiocesan seminary where he completed his secondary studies, upon being transferred to Białystok.

Archbishop Romuald Jalbrzykowski ordained him as a priest on 18 June 1950, and he was an associate pastor at Szudzialowo. After a year of parish experience, he was sent to Lublin to continue his preparation in theology at the Catholic University of Lublin. He earned a doctorate in moral theology in 1955. From 1956 to 1959 he was university chaplain in Białystok. He then taught in the seminary at Warmia, while also working in the diocesan Curia of Olsztyn.

=== Episcopacy ===
On 12 January 1970, Pope Paul VI appointed him titular Bishop of Acci and made him apostolic administrator of the Polish section of the Archdiocese of Vilnius (Białystok). The following 8 February he received his episcopal consecration from Cardinal Stefan Wyszyński.

On 3 January 1976, he became Archbishop of Wrocław.

A few days before martial law was imposed in 1981, the local Solidarity union branch withdrew from its bank account 80 million zlotys, the equivalent of USD 3 million in 2024, and deposited the cash with Gulbinowicz, who hid it from the communist regime during Solidarity's delegalisation.

=== Cardinalate ===
On 25 May 1985 Gulbinowicz was created cardinal by John Paul II.

He was recognized as a voice of the moderate wing of the church in Poland. Where Cardinal Glemp of Warsaw warned priests against involvement with Solidarity, Gulbinowicz intervened with the Communist government on behalf of striking railway repair yard workers. In 1985 he identified the Church closely with Lech Wałęsa's leadership and told crowds of union-supporting pilgrims "Hang in there, as we are hanging in". A year later he told a similar crowd: "Only the right to organize independent organizations will enable Poland to overcome the severe political and economic crises troubling this country." At a ceremony commemorating the 50th anniversary of the Soviet invasion of Poland, he counselled patience with the post-Soviet government's attempts to rebuild Poland's economy and political institutions. He said "every thinking person in Poland understands that the good toward which the nation is moving must be paid for at the beginning with sacrifices.... Some laughed at our ideals, and even at the people who were faithful to those ideals" and said that Solidarity had proved faithful to its principles. He also avoided Glemp's "nationalist tones". When he welcomed the Pope to Wrocław, he spoke of tolerance and said the city was the work of various nationalities and religions over the centuries.

==== Resignation ====
Pope John Paul accepted his resignation as Archbishop of Wrocław on 3 April 2004, when he was thought to be 75 years old, the age at which bishops are required to submit their resignations. It then transpired that in 1942, as a young man, Gulbinowicz had falsified his birth records to escape being sent to a labor camp in Germany, listing the year of his birth as 1928 instead of 1923. Though the falsification suggested he was ordained a priest at a very young age, his correct age only became public in 2004 when an Italian newspaper noted that John Paul had accepted his resignation as Bishop of Wrocław at the age of 80, not 75. In 2005, with the end of Pope John Paul's life approaching, the birth-year discrepancy became more important and was published more widely. Had Gulbinowicz been born in 1928, he would have been eligible to participate in a conclave to select John Paul's successor. With the correction, it was seen that he was past his 80th birthday and ineligible. Gulbinowicz told the Catholic Information Agency (Poland) that many of his peers employed this strategy and that after the war no one thought it necessary to restore his true birthdate to his documents. He said that his superiors had known the truth from the time he entered the seminary and that John Paul had known from before he became Pope. The correct birth date was printed in the Pontifical Yearbook presented to John Paul on 31 January 2005. (Note: Even in Poland his birth year was thought to be 1928 as late as October 2003, when he was reported to have reached the normal retirement age of 75.)

He was the author of a number of works in the new area of moral and doctrinal theology and on the formation of the clergy.

== Sexual abuse findings ==
On 6 November 2020, the Holy See's Nuncio to Poland announced that following a Vatican investigation regarding sex abuse allegations against Gulbinowicz, Gulbinowicz was now "barred from any kind of celebration or public meeting and from using his episcopal insignia, and is deprived of the right to a cathedral funeral and burial." He was ordered to pay "an appropriate sum" to his alleged victims.

== Death ==
Gulbinowicz died on 16 November 2020 at 10:40 AM, 10 days after the ruling against him was given, after having fallen unconscious in hospital. He was admitted to hospital in Wrocław on 10 November. He died due to respiratory and circulatory failure after having acute pneumonia. His body was cremated and the ashes buried on 23 November in secrecy at his family's tomb at Olsztyn, where his parents were buried.

== Notes ==
Catholic Church titles
New title	Titular Bishop of Acci; 12 January 1970 – 3 January 1976	Succeeded by Giuse Phan Văn Hoa
Preceded by Władysław Suszyński	Apostolic Administrator of Vilnius; 12 January 1970 – 3 January 1976	Succeeded by Edward Kisiel
Preceded by Bolesław Kominek	Archbishop of Wrocław; 3 January 1976 – 3 April 2004	Succeeded by Marian Gołębiewski
New title	Cardinal-Priest of Immacolata Concezione di Maria a Grottarossa; 25 May 1985 – 16 November 2020	Succeeded by Wilton Daniel Gregory
