= Henryk Siedlaczek =

Polish politician (born 1956)

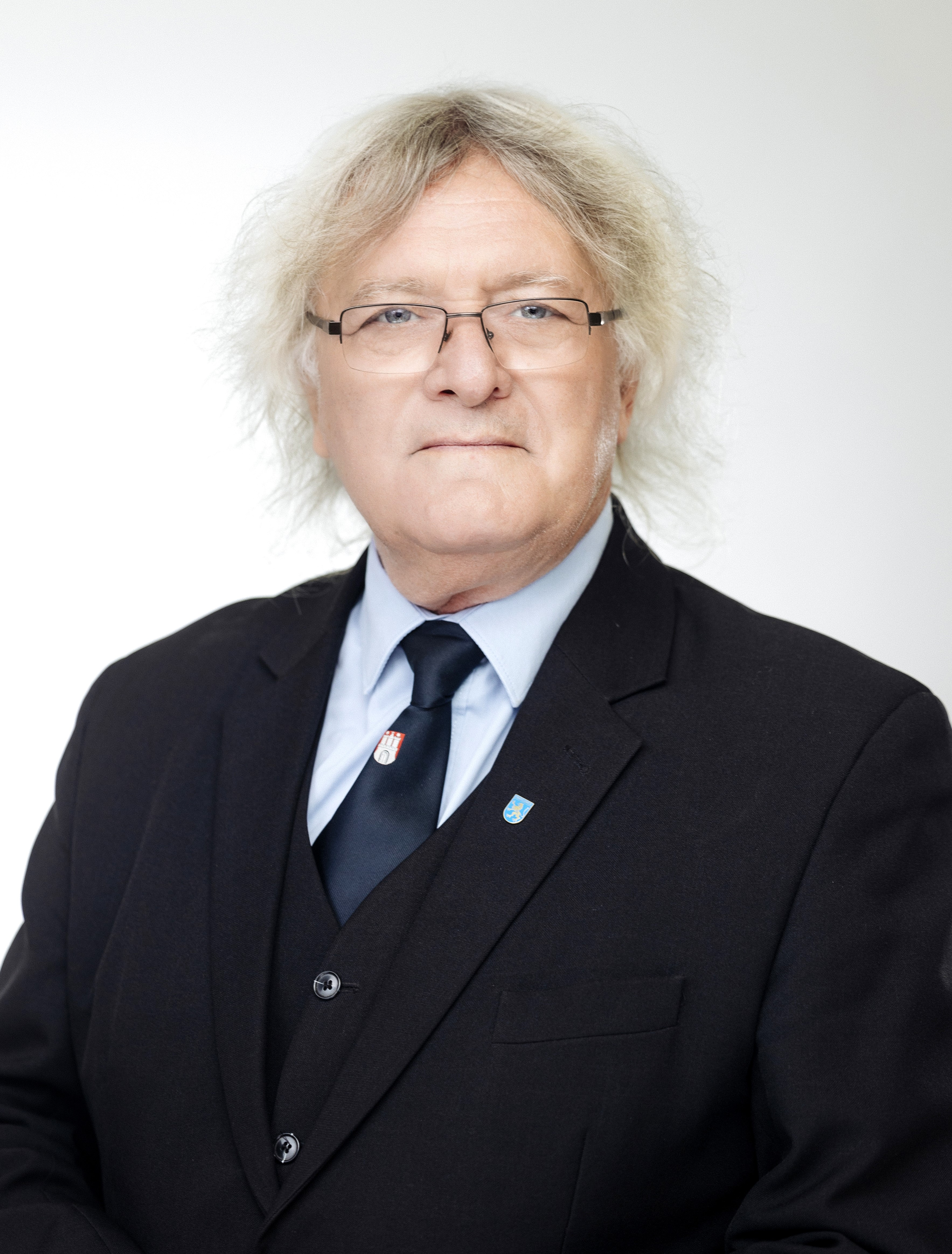

member of Sejm 2005-2007
- In office 25 September 2005 – ?

Personal details
- Born: 1956 (age 69–70) Wodzisław Śląski, Stalinogród Voivodeship, Polish People's Republic
- Party: Civic Platform

Henryk Piotr Siedlaczek (born 30 January 1956 in Wodzisław) is a Polish politician. He was elected to the Sejm on 25 September 2005, getting 7476 votes in 30 Rybnik district as a candidate from the Civic Platform list.

== See also ==
- Members of Polish Sejm 2005-2007
