= Wodzisław Śląski =

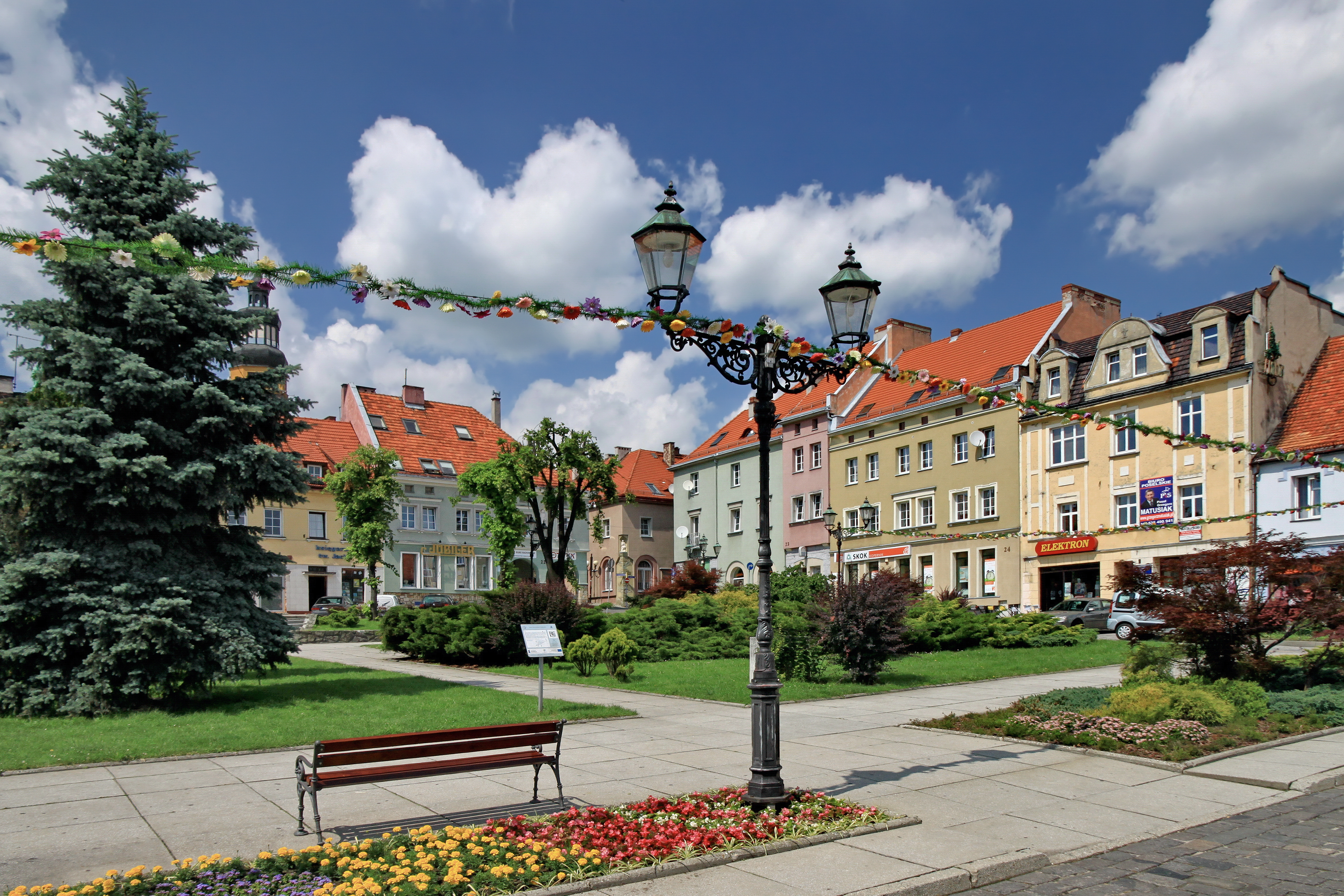
- Old City Square

- Flag Coat of arms
- Interactive map of Wodzisław Śląski
- Location within Silesian Voivodeship Location within Poland
- Coordinates: 50°0′N 18°27′E
- Country: Poland
- Voivodeship: Silesian
- County: Wodzisław Śląski
- Gmina: Wodzisław Śląski (urban gmina)
- City rights: 1257
- Named for: Vladislaus I of Opole

Government
  - City mayor: Mieczysław Kieca

Area
  - City: 49.62 km^{2} (19.16 sq mi)
- Highest elevation: 290 m (950 ft)
- Lowest elevation: 210 m (690 ft)

Population (2019-06-30)
  - City: 47,992
  - Density: 967.2/km^{2} (2,505/sq mi)
  - Metro: 650,000
- Time zone: UTC+1 (CET)
  - Summer (DST): UTC+2 (CEST)
- Postal code: 44-286 to 44–373
- Vehicle registration: SWD
- Website: www.wodzislaw-slaski.pl

Wodzisław Śląski (Polish: [vɔˈd͡ʑiswaf ˈɕlɔ̃skʲi];, Czech: Vladislav, Latin: Vladislavia, is a town in Silesian Voivodeship, southern Poland with 47,992 inhabitants (2019). It is the seat of Wodzisław County.

It was previously in Katowice Voivodeship (1975–1998); close to the border with the Czech Republic, about 350 kilometres (217 miles) south of Warsaw and about 140 kilometres (87 miles) west of Kraków, on the southern outskirts of the metropolitan area known as the Upper Silesian Coal Basin.

== Geography ==
=== Location ===
Wodzisław Śląski is an urban gmina in the south-eastern part of Upper Silesia, now in Silesian Voivodeship in south Poland, within the south portion of the Upper Silesian Coal Basin. It borders the towns of Pszów, Radlin and villages Marklowice, Mszana, Godów, Gorzyce and Lubomia. It lies between the Vistula and Oder rivers, near Czech border in the foreground Moravian Gate. Several rivers flow through the city, the major two being the Leśnica and "Zawadka" rivers. Within 500 km (311 mi) of Wodzisław Śląski are the capital cities of six countries: Berlin, Vienna, Prague, Bratislava, Budapest and Warsaw.

=== Climate ===
The climate of the area is continental humid. The average temperature is 8 °C (46 °F) (average −1.7 °C (28.9 °F) in January and up to average 17.7 °C (63.9 °F) in July). Yearly rainfall averages at 786 mm (30.94 in), the most rainy month being July. The area's characteristic weak and medium winds blow at about 4 m/s from the south-west (Moravian Gate).

=== Districts ===
The town is divided into 9 districts that have its own administrative body:

- Jedłownik Szyb
- Jedłownik-Turzyczka-Karkoszka
- Kokoszyce
- Nowe Miasto (new city)
- Trzy Wzgórza (Three Hills)
- Radlin II
- Stare Miasto (old city)
- Wilchwy
- Zawada

== History ==
Being a borderland town, Wodzisław Śląski is a centre of the Wodzisław County, formed during a historical process lasting many centuries. Rich excavations the oldest finds dated back to the Stone Age give evidence about its ancient inhabitants.

=== Middle Ages ===
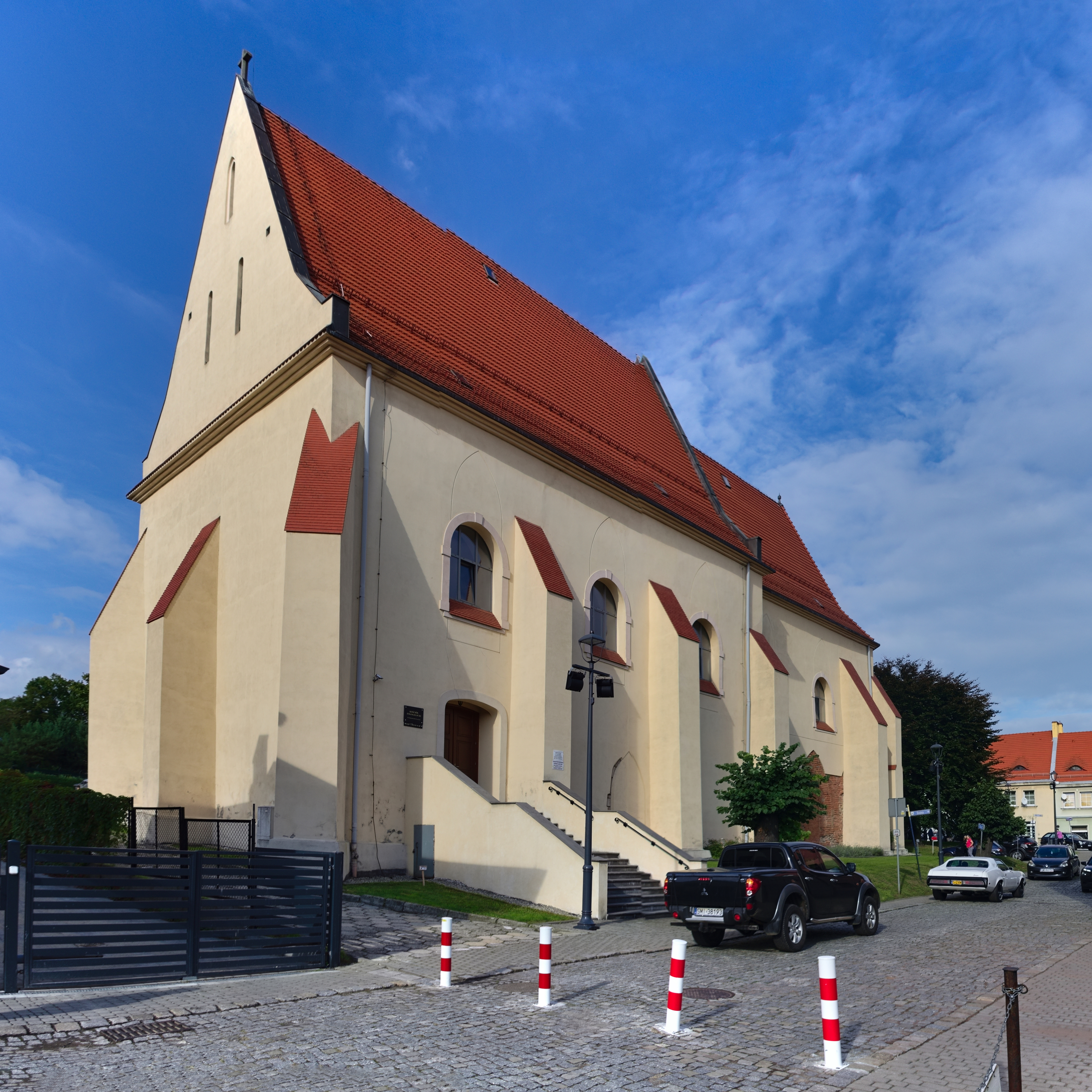
Medieval Minorite Church now Evangelical Holy Trinity Church

The city's name derives from the Piast Duke Władysław of Opole. He located the city and established the Wodzisław monastery about 1257.

The city's origins can be traced back into the 10th and 11th century, when three Slavic settlements existed on Wodzisław's present-day territory which eventually merged to form one town. In the course of the medieval eastward migration of Flemish and German settlers (Ostsiedlung), Wodzisław, as many other Polish settlements, was incorporated (granted city status and right) according to the so-called Magdeburg Law at some point before 1257 (the exact date remains unknown). This, however, is not to be confused with a change in national affiliation; Wodzisław continued to be part of the Kingdom of Poland, until most of Silesia became a fiefdom of the Bohemian crown in 1327. At that times of Duchess Constance, the town developed fast. Wodzisław was one of the most populated and richest towns of Upper Silesia. In 14 and 15th century the city continued to grow and developed into a regional trade centre. In the 15th century, the Hussites devastated the city. From 1526, Bohemia, including the fiefdom of Silesia, which Wodzisław was a part of, came under the authority of the Habsburg crown.

=== Early Modern Age ===
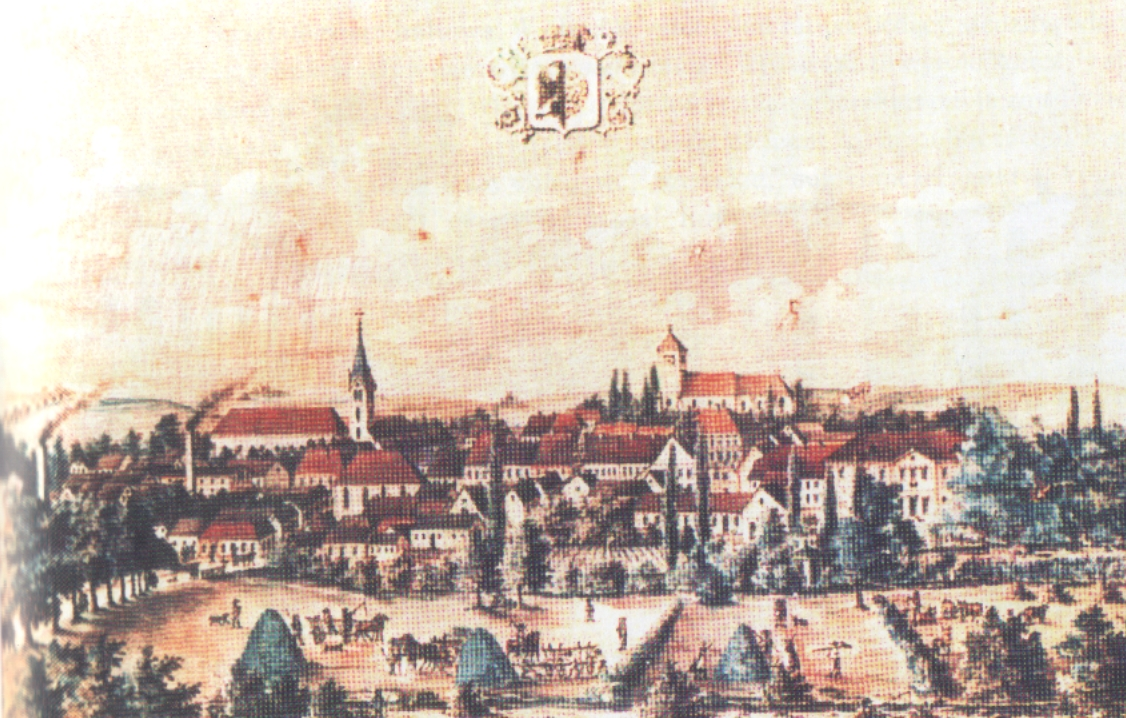
Loslau in 1874

After the end of the Thirty Years' War Wodzisław was destroyed. Never back to Middle Ages' "golden time". At the beginning of the War of the Austrian Succession between King Frederick II of Prussia (the Great) and the Habsburg empress Maria Theresa of Austria, the greatest part of Silesia, including Wodzisław, was annexed by the Kingdom of Prussia in 1740, which Austria eventually recognized in 1763. In 1815 the city became part of the Prussian Province of Silesia and was located in the Rybnik district. Coal mining gained importance for Wodzisław's economy as early as the 19th century.

=== 20th century ===
After the end of World War I in 1918, Polish statehood was restored. Amidst an atmosphere of ethnic unrest, a referendum was organized to determine the future national affiliation of Upper Silesia. In Wodzisław, out of 2,333 votes, 1,669 (72%) were in favour of Germany and 662 (28%) were in favour of Poland. However, the Rybnik district as a whole voted in favour of Poland with a 65% majority. The town and the largest part of the district were attached to the territory of the Second Polish Republic; Wodzisław thus became part of a Polish state for the first time since 1335 when Poland had ceded Silesia to Bohemia in the Treaty of Trentschin. The Upper Silesia plebiscite and eventual division of Upper Silesia were accompanied by three Silesian Uprisings of Polish militants. Within the Second Polish Republic of the interwar period, Wodzisław was part of the Silesian Voivodeship, which enjoyed far-reaching political and financial autonomy.

With the outbreak of World War II in 1939, Wodzisław was invaded and then occupied by Germany, being in the part of Poland that was directly incorporated into the German state. The population was ethnically categorized and either "re-Germanized" or disfranchised and partially expelled into the General Government as Poles. Two local Polish policemen were murdered by the Russians in the Katyn massacre in 1940.

On 22 January 1945 a death march from Nazi German's Auschwitz concentration camp, 35 mi (56 km) away, ended in Wodzisław Śląski, where the prisoners were put on freight trains to other camps. When the Soviet army advanced on Poland, nine days before the Soviets arrived, the Schutzstaffel had marched 60,000 prisoners out of the camp. Approximately 15,000 prisoners died on the way. There are memorials to the victims of the Holocaust from Wodzisław in Wodzisław and in the Baron Hirsch Cemetery Staten Island, New York where the Wodzisław landsmanshaft has a section.

On 26 March 1945 the Soviet army and 1st Czechoslovak Army Corps captured Wodzisław, which was then restored to Poland. Approximately 80% of the town was destroyed in World War II. The Old Town, including the Market Square, was fully restored after the war.

== Transport ==
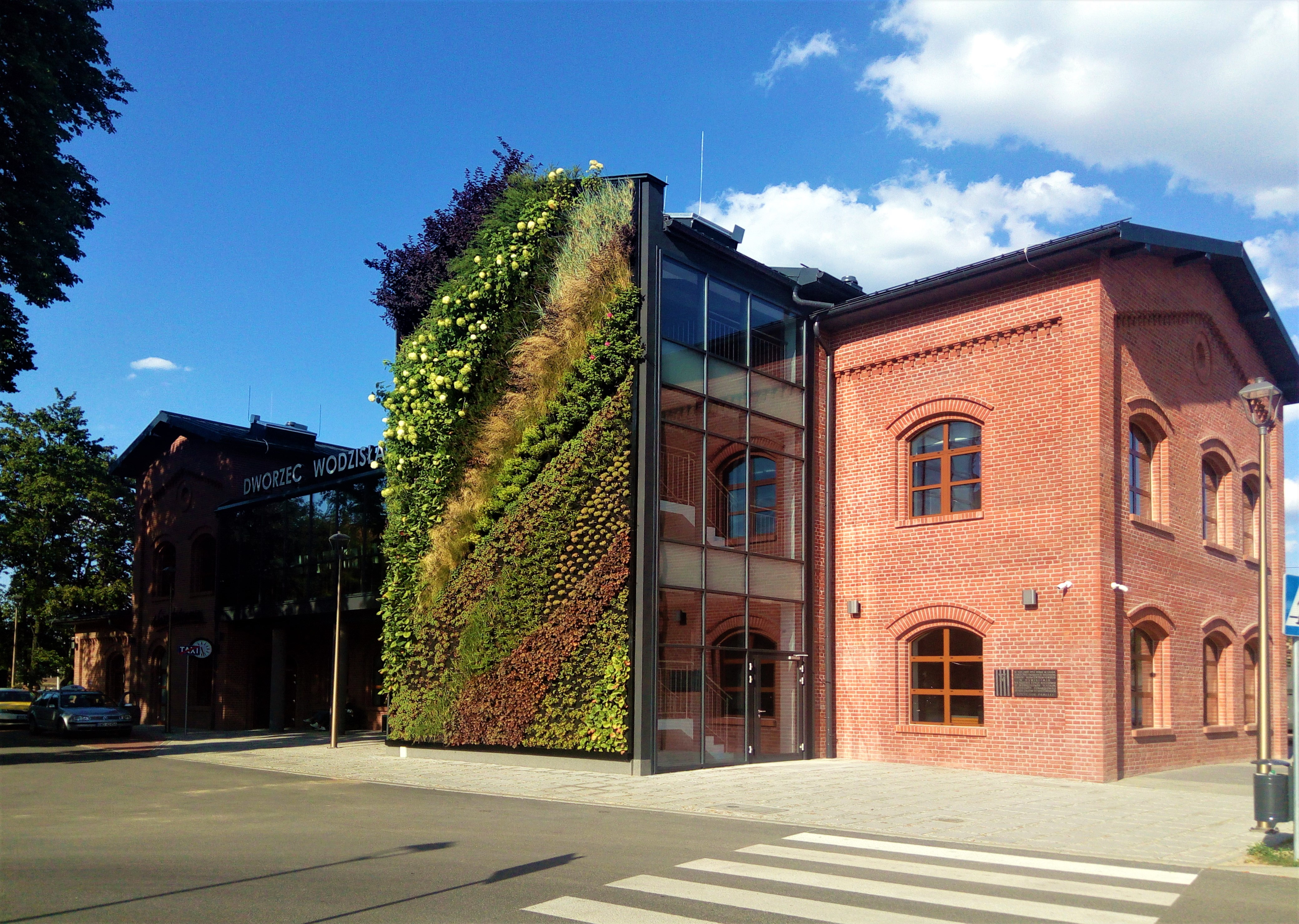
Wodzisław Śląski railway station

Wodzisław Śląski is situated at the junction of several major lines of road, railway and air communication.

Only 5 km (3 mi) from center the town crossing motorway A1. The town is crossed by one national road 78 ("DK78" from Gliwice to Ostrava) and tree regional roads running from Żory and Jastrzębie-Zdrój to Racibórz and from Wodzisław to Krzyżanowice ( "DW932", "DW933", "DW936" ).

The railway junction at "Wodzisław Śląski" is a major transshipment point.

The town is very well connected to three international airports: Katowice – Pyrzowice (about 80 km (50 mi) away), Kraków – Balice (about 100 km (62 mi) away) and Ostrava – Mosnov (about 45 km (28 mi) away).

== Economy ==
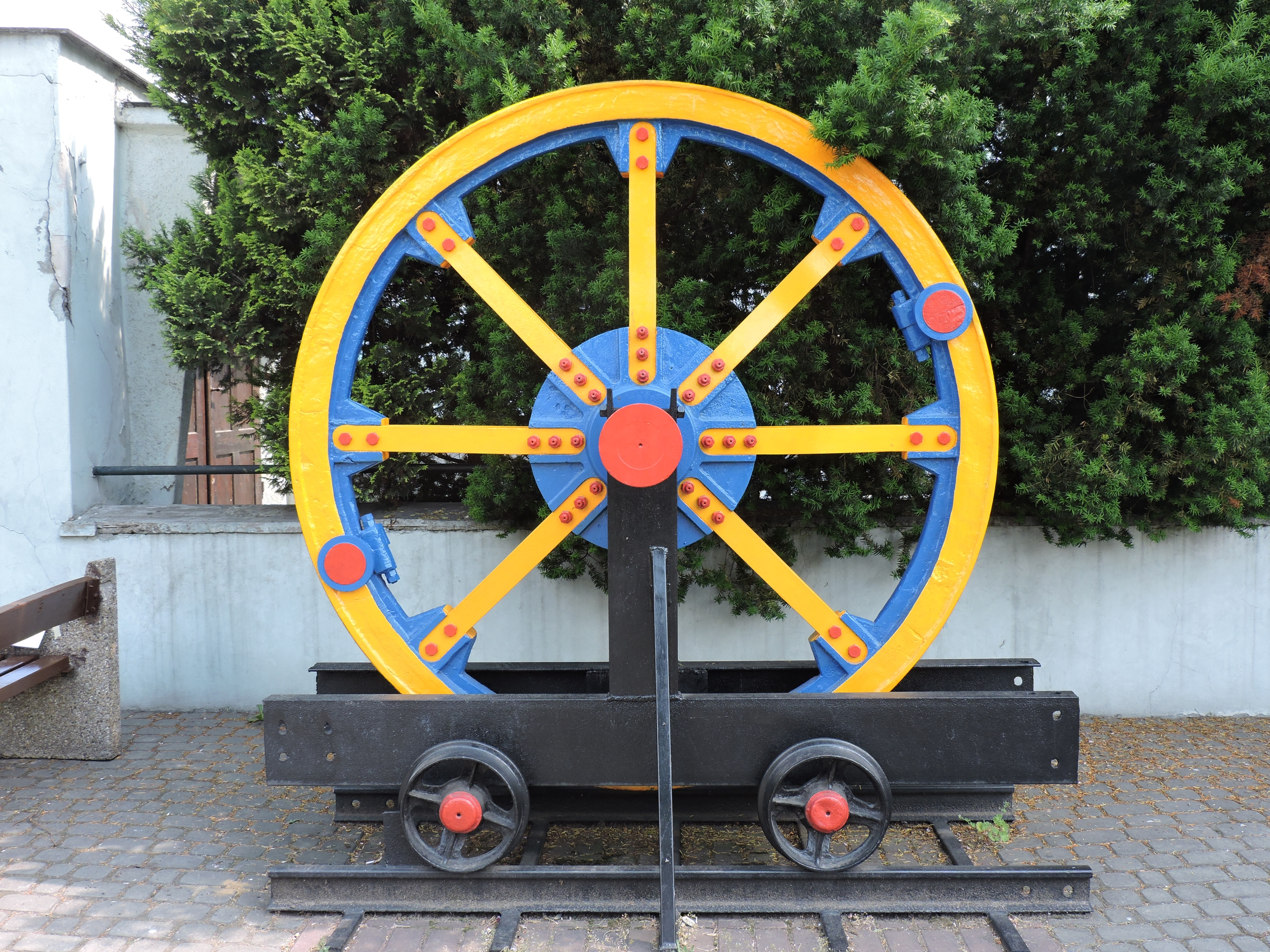
Memorial to the closed 1 Maja Coal Mine

Wodzisław Śląski is center and capital of the Wodzisław County. City is situated on the main highway from nord Poland to south Poland and border with Czech Republic.

=== Coal centre ===
Wodzisław Śląski is a medium coal and industrial centre. Although there is no coal mines in the town (1 Maja Coal Mine closed in 2001), there are a few in its neighborhood (Radlin – Marcel Coal Mine, Pszów, Rydułtowy – Rydułtowy-Anna Coal Mine, Jastrzębie – Jas-Mos Coal Mine) and a coke manufacture in Radlin. The window factory Eko-Okna is also located in Wodzisław Śląski.

== Culture ==
The town has one library, one museum and one cinema.

== Tourism ==
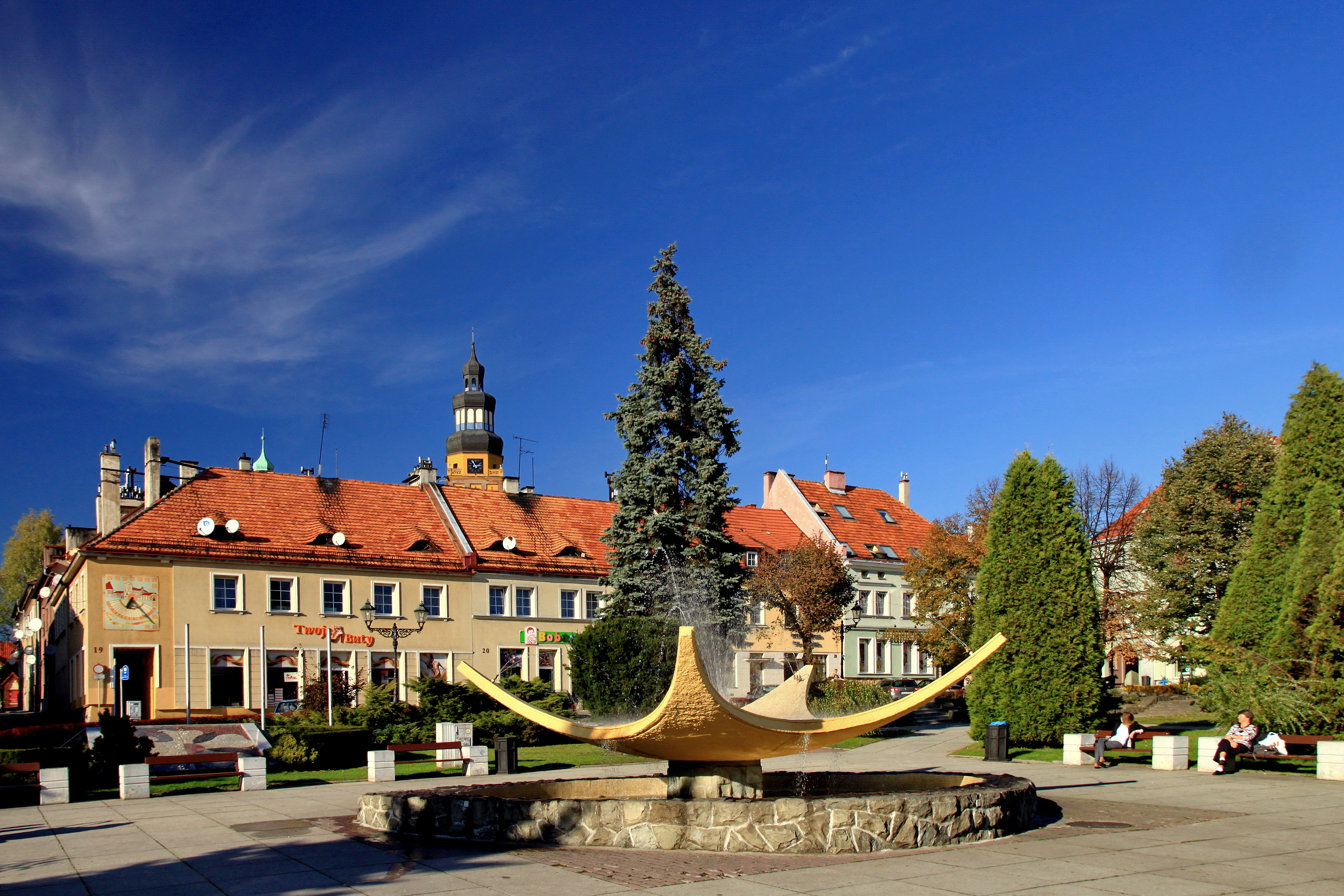
Fountain at the market square

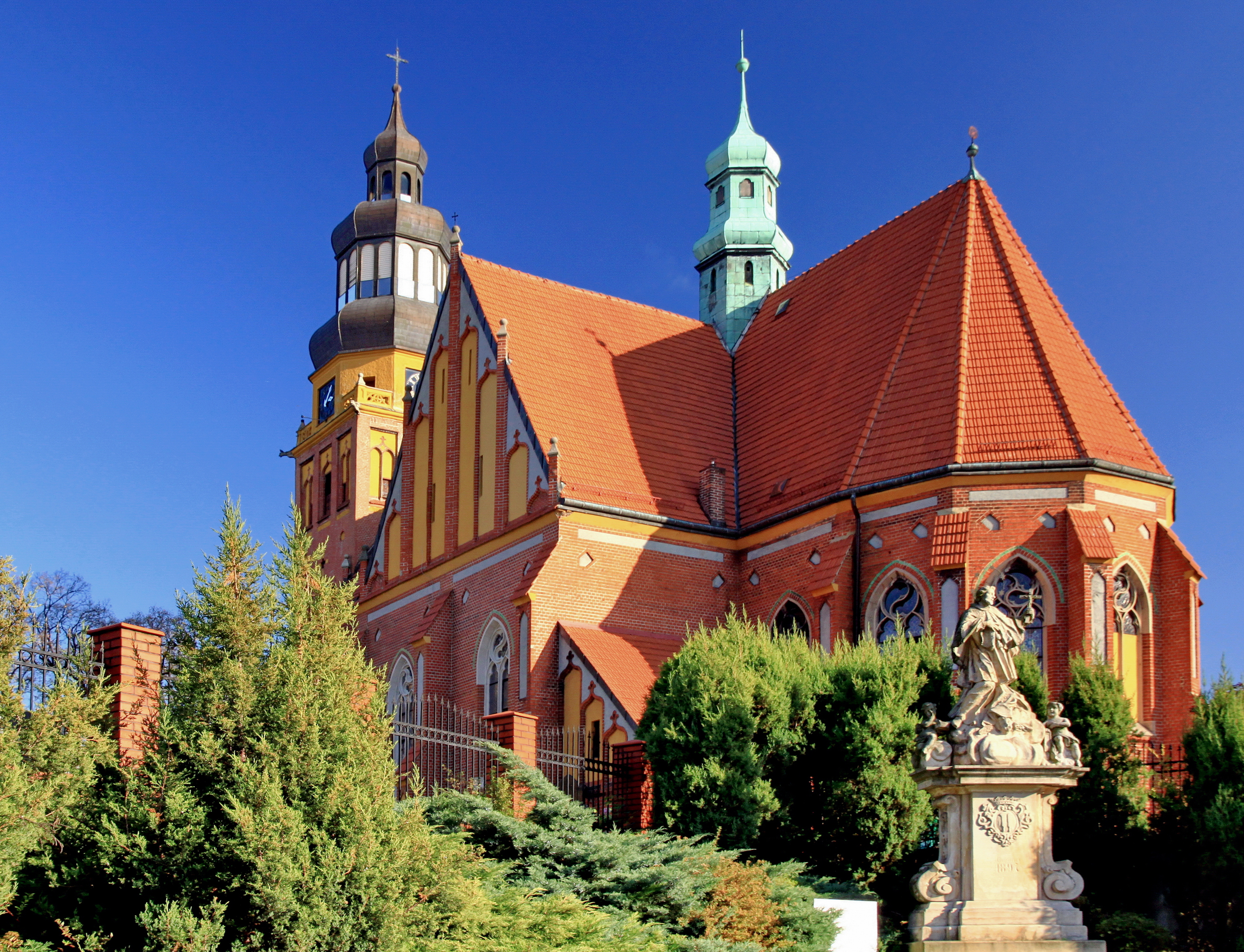
Church of the Assumption

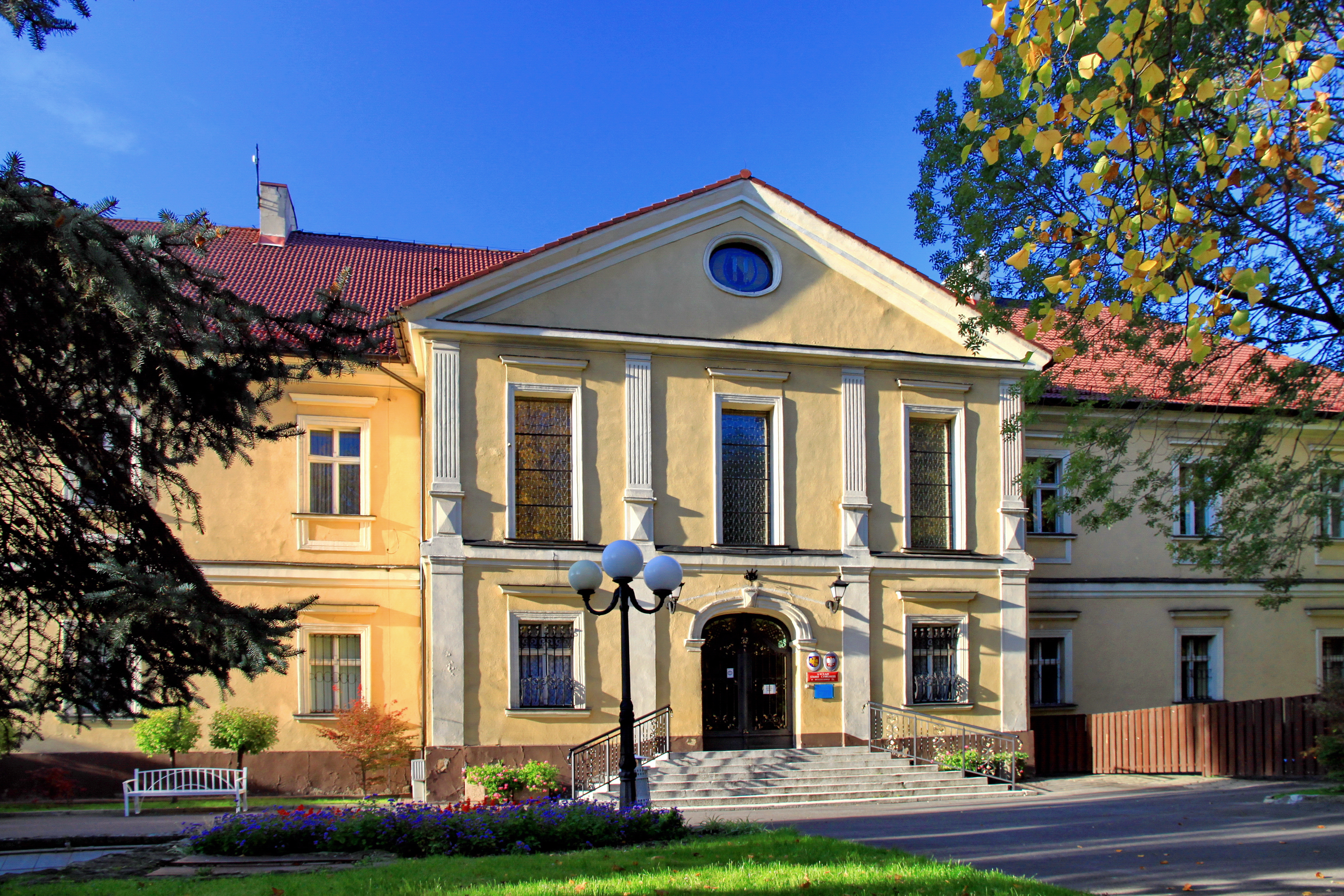
Palace and Museum

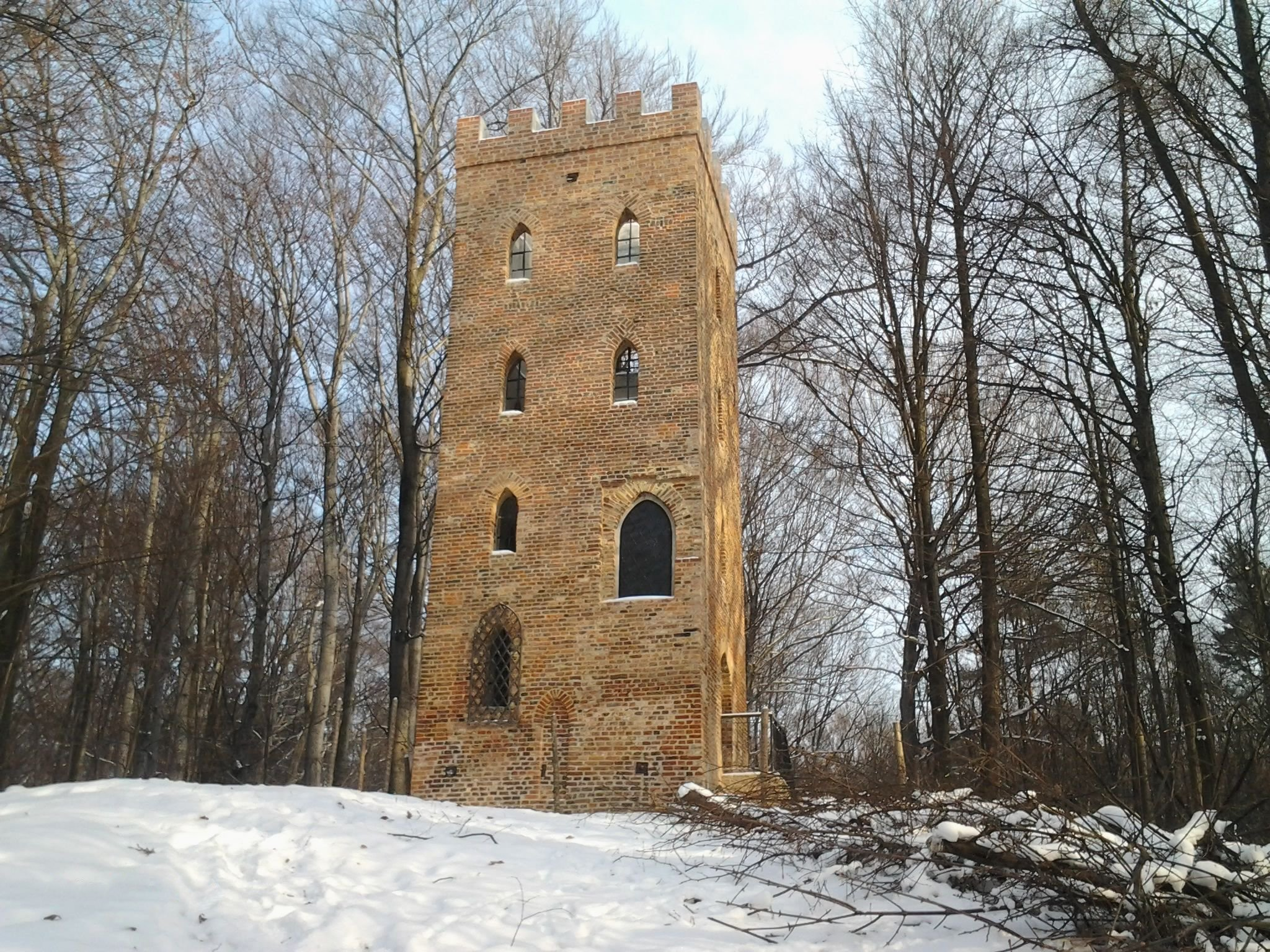
Gothic Revival Knights' Tower

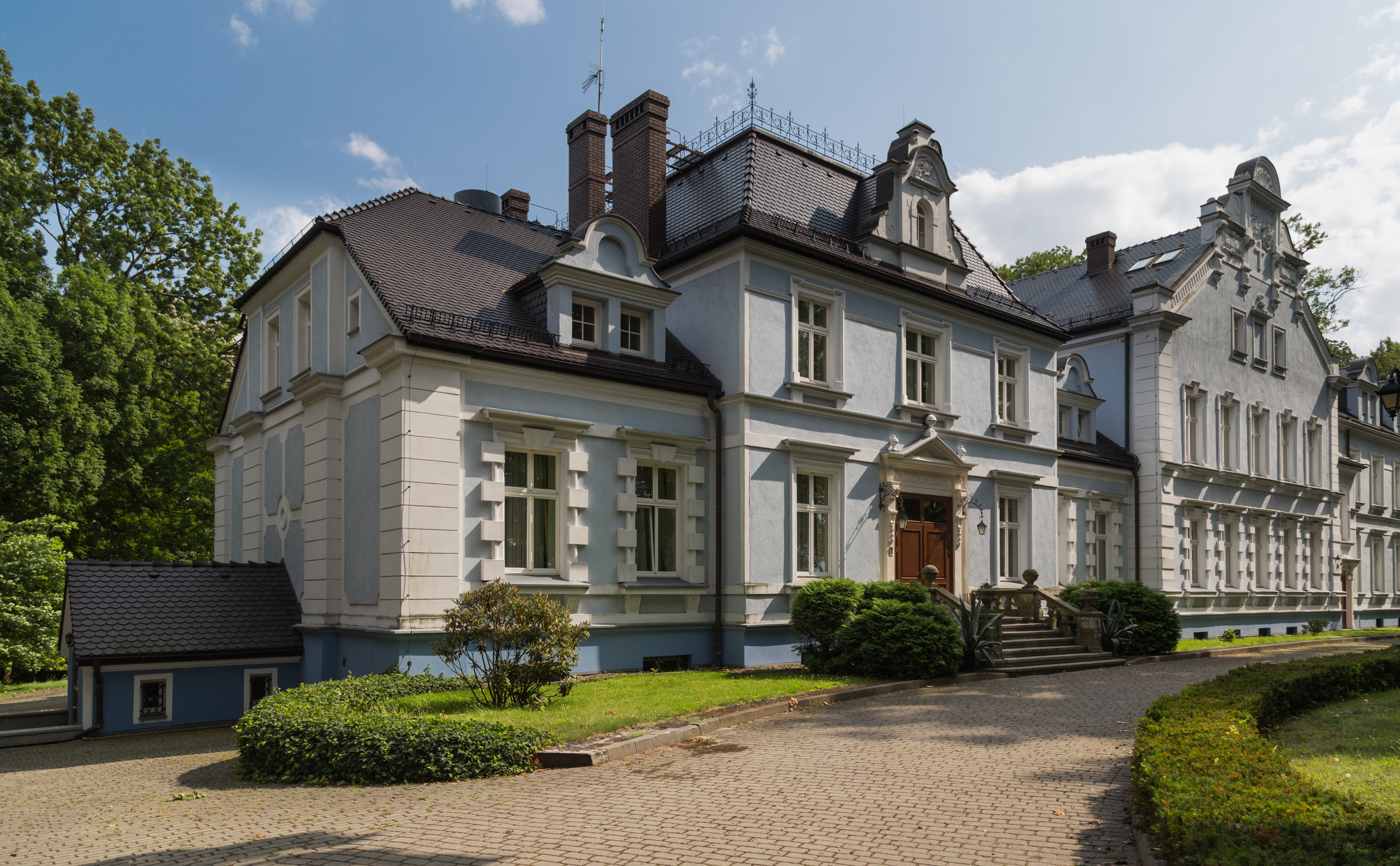
Kokoszyce Palace

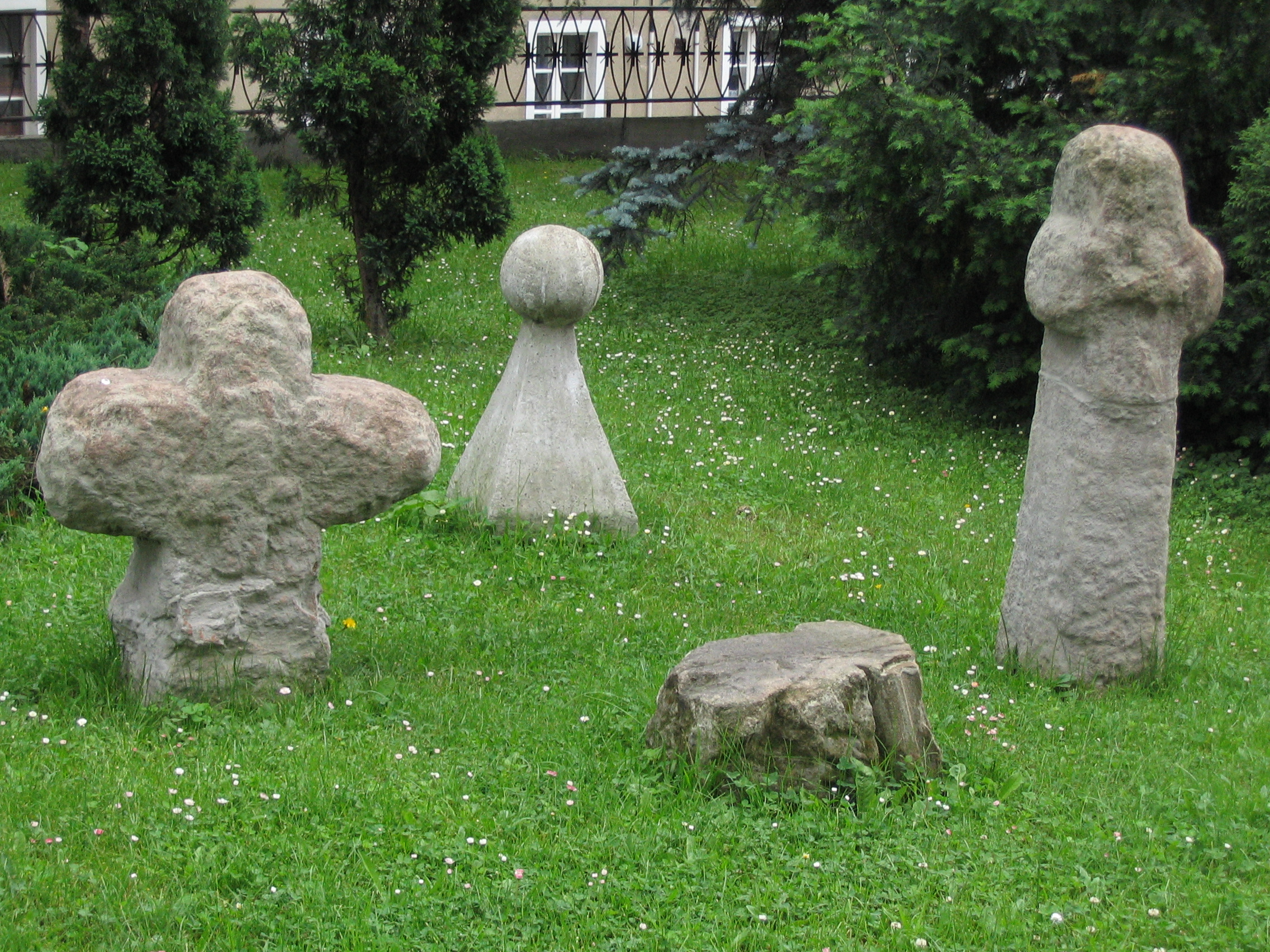
Medieval stone crosses

In contrast to the central part of the Upper Silesian industry area, located a short distance to the north, Wodzisław enjoys the reputation of a "green" city having a relatively clean environment. While the city is not a centre of tourism, it does have various interesting sights and opportunities for recreation. The Beskidy Mountains, a popular recreational area for skiing, are within one-hour drive also 10 km (6 mi) from town along the Odra river are interesting natural reserve and at summer places for swimming.

Sights

- the medieval Gothic Holy Trinity church (pol. Kościół św. Trójcy), erected in 1257;
- the Monastery from 17th century ( "Klasztor franciszkański" ), erected in 1257;
- the neo-Gothic church of "Assumption of St. Mary" (Kościół WNMP);
- the building of the former district authority (19th century);
- the neo-classical Wall tower ("Baszta rycerska");
- the Neoclassical Palace, oldest Neoclassical palace in Poland from 1745 with Castle Park, housing the Museum in Wodzisław Śląski;
- the old town square (Rynek);
- the Palace in Kokoszyce (Pałac w Kokoszycach), built in 1823;,
- the Synagogue from 1826 (today supermarket on Targowa street);
- the Balaton small lake in the forest (Grodzisko);
- the Trzy Wzgórza (Tree Hills) park and recreation centre.

== Education ==
In Wodzisław Śląski there are:

- 19 kindergartens
- 13 primary schools
- 5 high schools
- 2 colleges

== Sport ==
- Odra Wodzisław – football team
- MOSiR Stadium
- WSP Wodzisław Śląski (juniors)

== Notable people ==
- Constance, Duchess of Wodzisław (?–1351), princess from the House of Piast and sovereign Duchess of Wodzisław Śląski from 1324 until her death
- Benjamin Wolf Löw (1775–1851), Polish–Hungarian rabbi
- Paweł Pośpiech (1879–1922), priest, activist and journalist
- Wanda Treumann (1883–1963), actress and film producer
- Bolesław Kominek (1903–1974), Cardinal of the Roman Catholic Church
- Stanisław Oślizło (born 1937), footballer
- Idzi Panic (born 1952), historian
- Henryk Siedlaczek (born 1956), politician
- Ryszard Wieczorek (born 1962), football coach and former player
- Tomasz Sikora (born 1973), biathlete and Olympic medalist
- Leszek Blanik (born 1977), gymnast, World and Olympic champion in vault
- Wojtek Czyz (born 1980), German Paralympic athlete
- Mariusz Pawełek (born 1981), footballer
- Claudia Ciesla (born 1987), Polish-German model and actress, best known for her work in Bollywood
- Kamil Wilczek (born 1988), footballer

== Twin towns – sister cities ==
Wodzisław Śląski is twinned with:

- Alanya, Turkey
- Artik, Armenia
- Gladbeck, Germany
- Karviná, Czech Republic
- Sallaumines, France
- Siret, Romania
