= 1 Maja Coal Mine =

Coal mine in Wodzisław Śląski, Poland

1 Maja coal mine
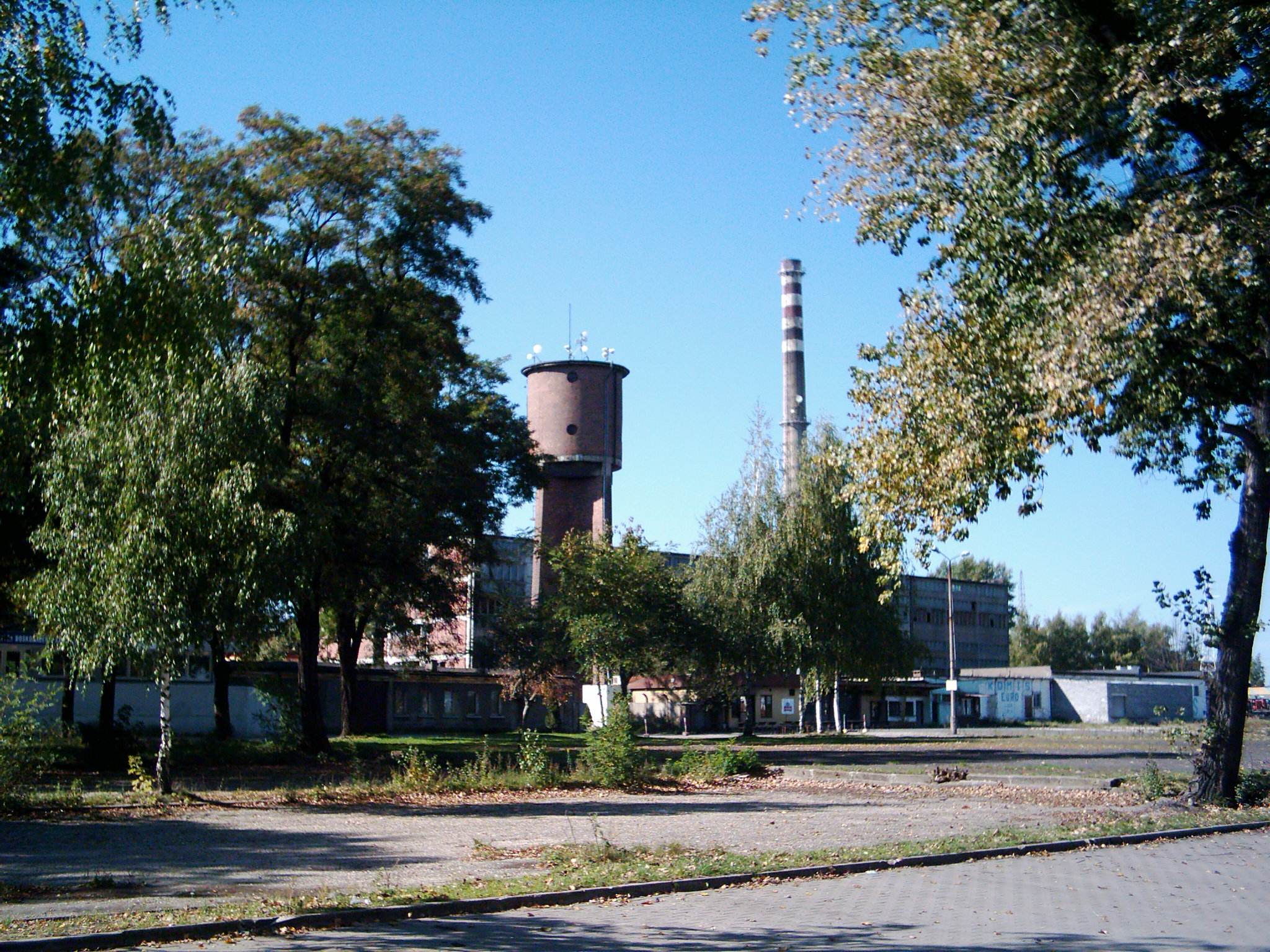
- Coal Mine after closed in 2007

- Location in Poland

Location
- Location: Wodzisław Śląski, Silesian Voivodeship, Poland; 49°58′44″N 018°29′41″E

Production
- Products: Coal
- Type: Public company

History
- Opened: 1960
- Closed: 2001

Owner
- Company: RSW S.A.

The 1 Maja coal mine (Coal Mine 1st May; pol. Kopalnia Węgla Kamiennego 1 Maja) was a large mine in the south of Poland in Wodzisław Śląski, Silesian Voivodeship, 260 km south-west of the capital, Warsaw.

Built in 1960, it was called "Mszana". Since 1961 it was called 1 Maja (1 May), in honor of International Workers' Day. It was one of the most modern and best coal mines in the Polish People's Republic. It was combined with Marcel Coal Mine in 1995. It closed in 2001. The coal mine covered 35.6 square kilometers, and coal production was around 8,400 tons per day.

Coal Mine 1 May was the general sponsor of the Polish football team Odra Wodzisław Śląski until the Mine's closure.

== See also ==
- Marcel Coal Mine
