= Marcel Coal Mine =

Marcel coal mine
- Location in Poland
- Location: Radlin, Silesian Voivodeship, Poland; 50°02′30″N 018°29′13″E
- Products: Coal
- Opened: 1858
- Company: Kompania Węglowa

The Marcel coal mine is a large mine in the south of Poland in Radlin near Wodzisław Śląski, Silesian Voivodeship, 260 km south-west of the capital, Warsaw.

Until 1949, it was called "Emma". In 1995, KWK Marcel was connected with 1 Maja Coal Mine.

Having estimated reserves of 76 million tonnes of coal near Marklowice and Wodzisław Śląski. The annual coal production is around 2.75 million tonnes.

== See also ==
- 1 Maja Coal Mine
