= Paweł Pośpiech =

Polish priest, activist and journalist

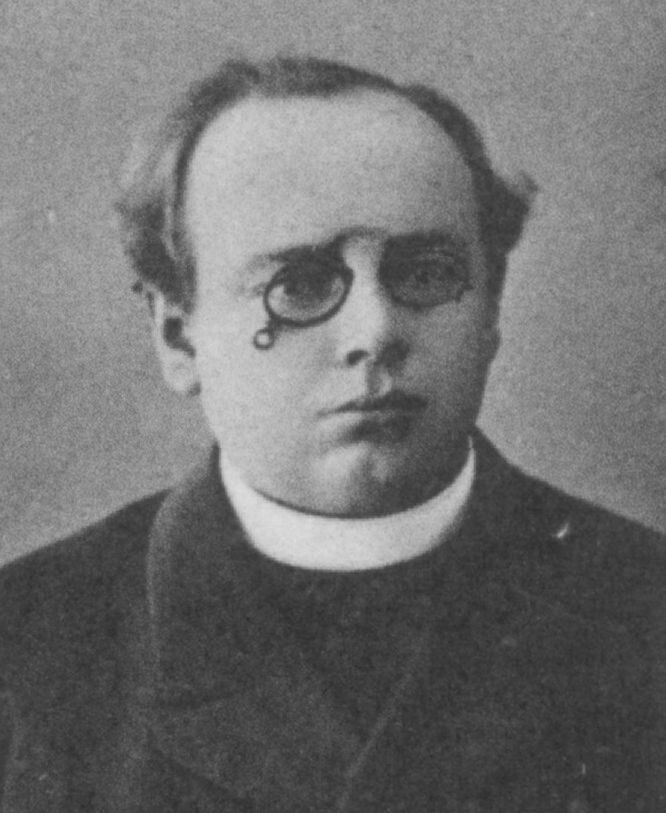
Paweł Pośpiech 1912

Paweł Pośpiech (1879 in Kokoszyce – 1922 in Pszczyna) was a Polish priest, activist and journalist.
