= Peter Joseph Jugis =

American Catholic prelate (born 1957)

His Excellency, The Most Reverend Peter Joseph Jugis
- Bishop Emeritus of Charlotte
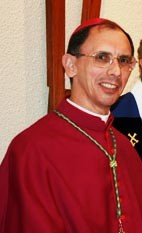
- Jugis in 2010
- Diocese: Charlotte
- Appointed: August 1, 2003
- Installed: October 24, 2003
- Retired: April 9, 2024
- Predecessor: William George Curlin
- Successor: Michael Thomas Martin OFM Conv.

Orders
- Ordination: June 12, 1983 by Pope John Paul II
- Consecration: October 24, 2003 by John Francis Donoghue, William G. Curlin, and F. Joseph Gossman

Personal details
- Born: March 3, 1957 (age 69) Charlotte, North Carolina
- Education: University of North Carolina at Charlotte (BA); Pontifical Gregorian University (STB; JCL); Catholic University of America (JCD)
- Motto: Caritas Christi urget nos (Latin for 'The love of Christ impels us')
- Styles
- Reference style: His Excellency; The Most Reverend
- Spoken style: Your Excellency
- Religious style: Bishop

Peter Joseph Jugis (born March 3, 1957) is an American Catholic prelate who served as bishop of Charlotte from 2003 to 2024.

== Biography ==
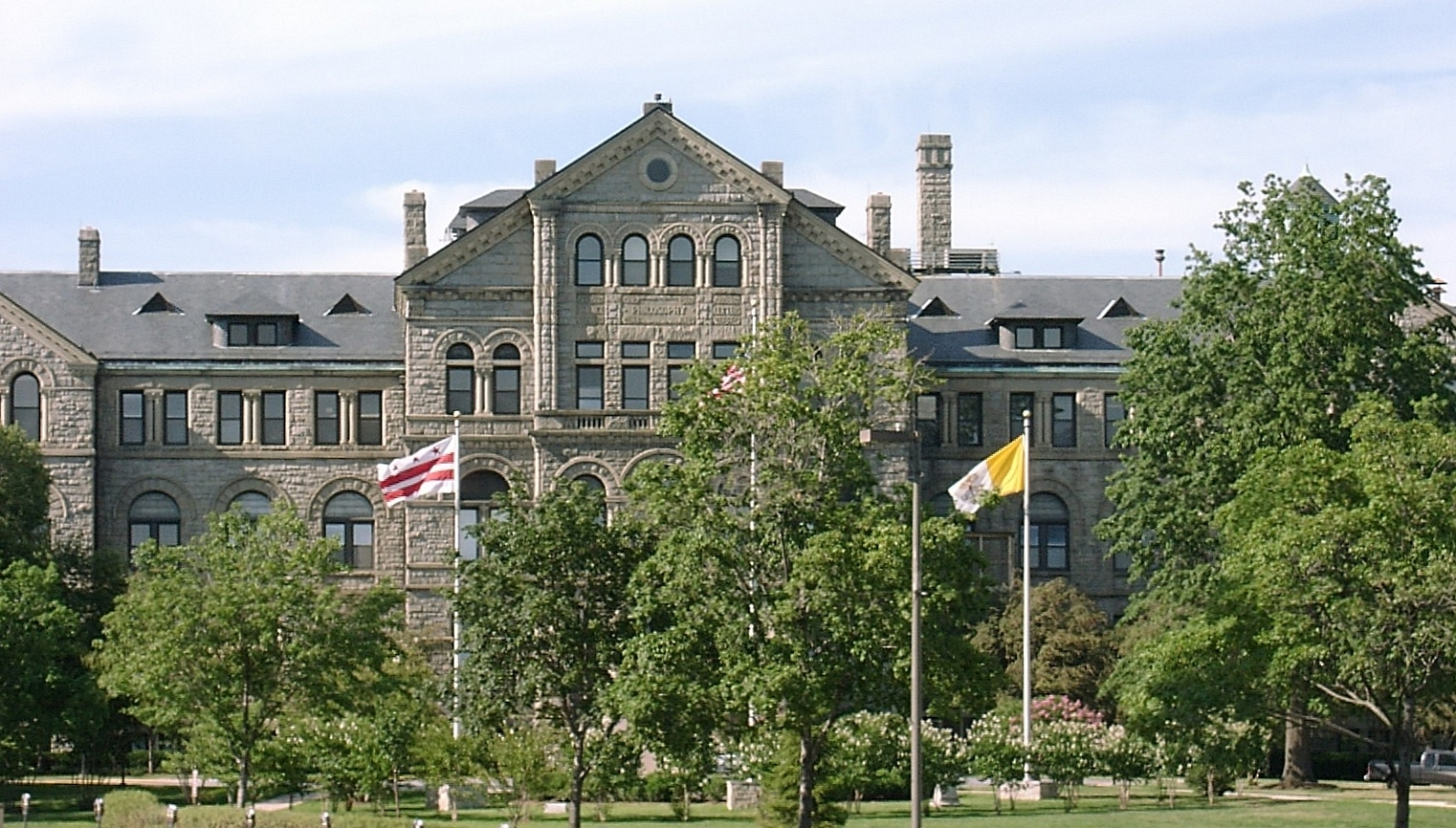
Catholic University of America, Washington, D.C. (2000)

=== Early life and education ===
Peter Jugis was born in Charlotte, North Carolina on March 3, 1957. He was baptized at St. Ann's Catholic Church in Charlotte in 1957 by Michael Joseph Begley. Jugis attended South Mecklenburg High School in Charlotte, graduating in 1975.

Jugis enrolled at the University of North Carolina at Charlotte, where he obtained a Bachelor of Business Administration degree in 1979. After deciding to enter the priesthood, Jugis went to Rome in 1979 to reside at the Pontifical North American College. He was awarded a Bachelor of Sacred Theology degree from the Pontifical Gregorian University in Rome in 1982.

=== Ordination and ministry ===
On June 12, 1983, Jugis was ordained to the priesthood for the Diocese of Charlotte by Pope John Paul II in St. Peter's Basilica in Rome. He received a Licentiate of Canon Law from the Gregorian University in 1984.

After Jugis returned to North Carolina in 1984, the diocese assigned him as parochial vicar of St. Leo the Great Parish in Winston-Salem. The next year, he was transferred to St. John Neumann Parish in Charlotte. In 1985, Bishop John Donoghue appointed Jugis as a judge on the marriage tribunal.

In 1987, Jugis began studying part-time at the Catholic University of America in Washington, D.C. while serving as parochial vicar at Sacred Heart Parish in Salisbury, North Carolina. In July 1991, Donoghue appointed him as judicial vicar of the diocese and parochial vicar at St. Leo the Great. Jugis received his Doctor of Canon Law degree from Catholic University in 1993.

Jugis next worked in North Carolina in the following pastoral assignments:

- pastor of Holy Infant Parish in Reidsville from 1993 to 1996
- pastor of Queen of the Apostles Parish in Belmont from 1996 to 1997
- administrator of Holy Spirit Parish in Denver from 1998 to 1999
- pastor of Our Lady of Lourdes Parish in Monroe from 1999 to 2003

=== Bishop of Charlotte ===
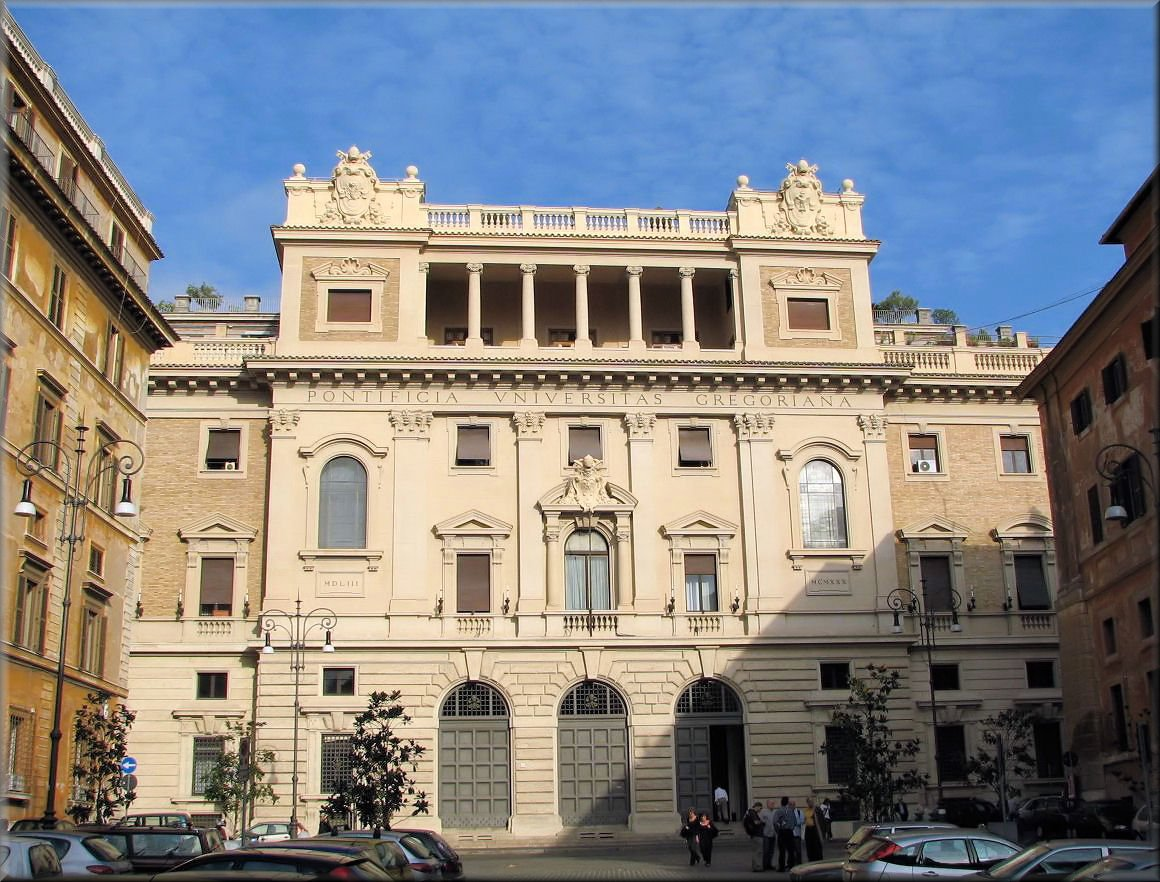
Pontifical Gregorian University, Rome, Italy (2006)

On August 1, 2003, Pope John Paul II named Jugis as the fourth bishop of Charlotte. On October 24, 2003, Jugis received his episcopal consecration at St. Matthew Church in Charlotte from Donoghue, with Bishops William Curlin and Francis Gossman serving as co-consecrators.

In 2013, the Survivors Network of those Abused by Priests (SNAP) criticized Jugis for not warning families in their diocese about Raymond P. Melville, a former Catholic priest who had moved to North Carolina. Melville had previously been accused of sexual abuse in Maine and Maryland.

Jugis asked for calm among the community in 2015 at Charlotte Catholic High School after a speech there by Sister Jane Dominic Laurel. Many parents had been upset by Laurel's remarks on single parenthood, LGBTQ people and divorce. At one point, Laurel stated that children raised by single parents had a greater chance of becoming gay or lesbian. Jugis also criticized parents for what he termed as disrespectful behavior towards Laurel.

In August 2018, following the release of a Pennsylvania grand jury report on priests with credible accusations of sexual abuse of children, Jugis stated that the Diocese of Charlotte was investigating allegations of sexual abuse by clergy and encouraged Catholics to pray for all sexual abuse victims. In December 2019, he released a list of fourteen priests credibly accused of sexual abuse in the diocese since 1972.

In July 2020, Jugis announced that he was banning Patrick Hoare, the newly appointed pastor of St. Matthew Parish in Charlotte, from active ministry on the recommendation of the diocesan lay review board. Hoare's suspension stemmed from a credible allegation of sexual abuse in Pennsylvania in the 1990s.

=== Retirement and legacy ===
Jugis submitted his resignation as bishop of Charlotte to the Vatican in June 2023, citing a chronic kidney condition that prevented him from performing his duties. Jugis is the longest-serving bishop in the diocese, having served for over 20 years. Pope Francis accepted his resignation on April 9, 2024.

== Viewpoints ==
=== Abortion rights ===
During the 2004 U.S. presidential election, Jugis said that Catholic politicians who support abortion rights for women should be denied communion unless they publicly recanted their views.

=== Immigration ===
Jugis criticized the Trump Administration in 2017 for its ban on refugees from seven Muslim-majority countries.

In April 2018, Jugis and Bishop Luis R. Zarama of Raleigh issued a joint statement calling for reform of federal immigration laws and affirming the need for compassion and justice towards undocumented immigrants.

=== LGBTQ rights ===
In 2009, Jugis endorsed an amendment to the North Carolina Constitution that banned same-sex marriage. On April 23, 2015, Jugis banned New Ways Ministry co-founder Sister Jeannine Gramick from speaking at St. Peter's Catholic Church in Charlotte. A diocese spokesperson said they cancelled Gramick's appearance because she opposed Catholic teachings on human sexuality.

== Liturgy ==
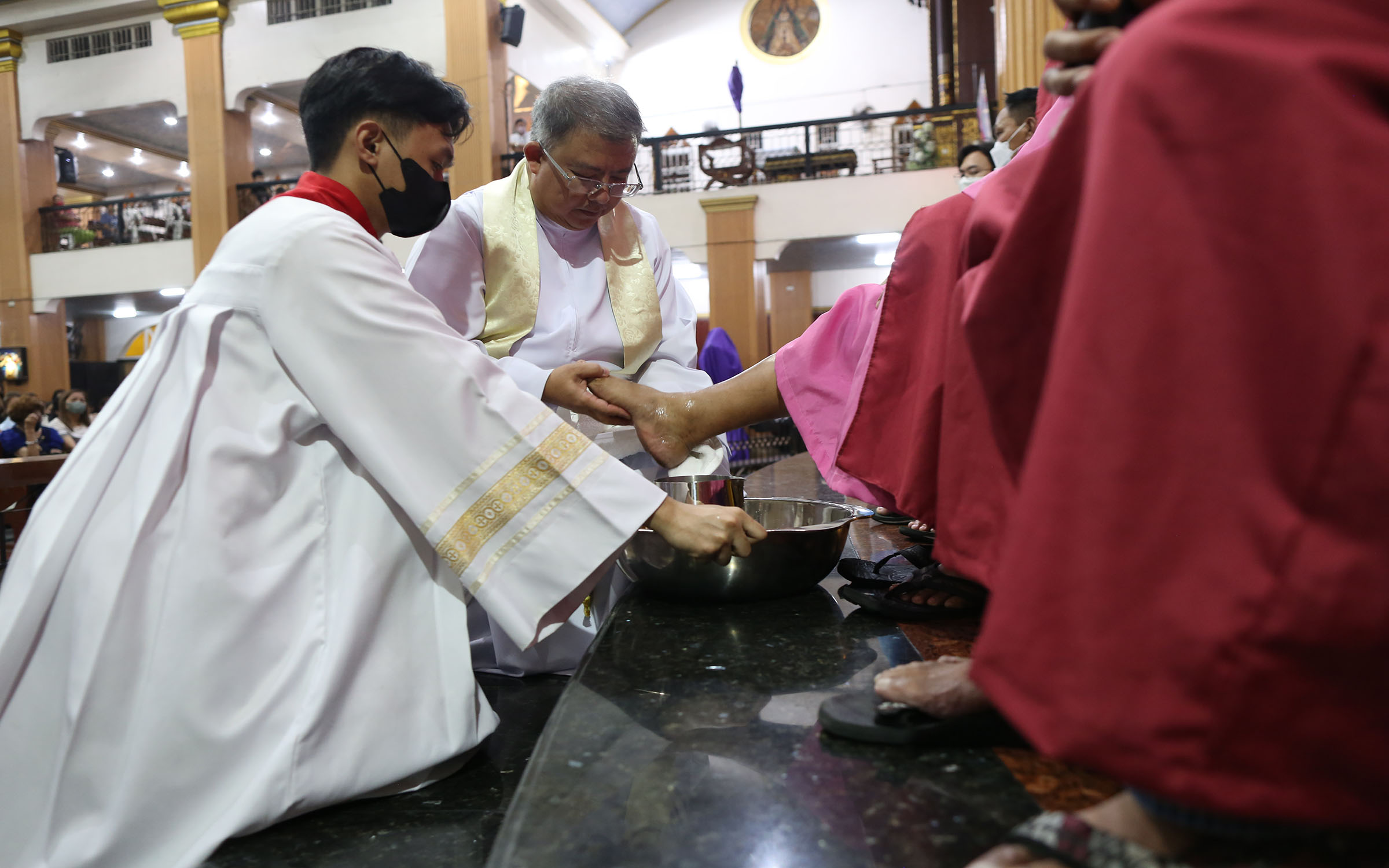
Catholic tradition of washing feet on Maundy Thursday (2023)

In 2005, following the publication of the Missale Romanum, editio typica tertia, its subsequent English translation, the accompanying General Instruction of the Roman Missal, and the publication instruction Redemptionis Sacramentum, Jugis issued liturgical norms for the diocese.

In 2006, Jugis reminded his priests that they were only allowed to perform the mandatum, the washing of feet during Holy Thursday, on male parishioners.

In December 2023, Jugis announced that the Vatican had approved the use of the Tridentine mass at four parishes in the diocese for the next two years.

== See also ==
- Catholic Church hierarchy
- Catholic Church in the United States
- Historical list of the Catholic bishops of the United States
- List of Catholic bishops of the United States
- Lists of patriarchs, archbishops, and bishops

Catholic Church titles
Preceded by William G. Curlin	Bishop of Charlotte; 2003 – 2024	Succeeded by Michael T. Martin
