= Cathedral of Saint Patrick (Charlotte, North Carolina) =

Historic church in North Carolina, United States

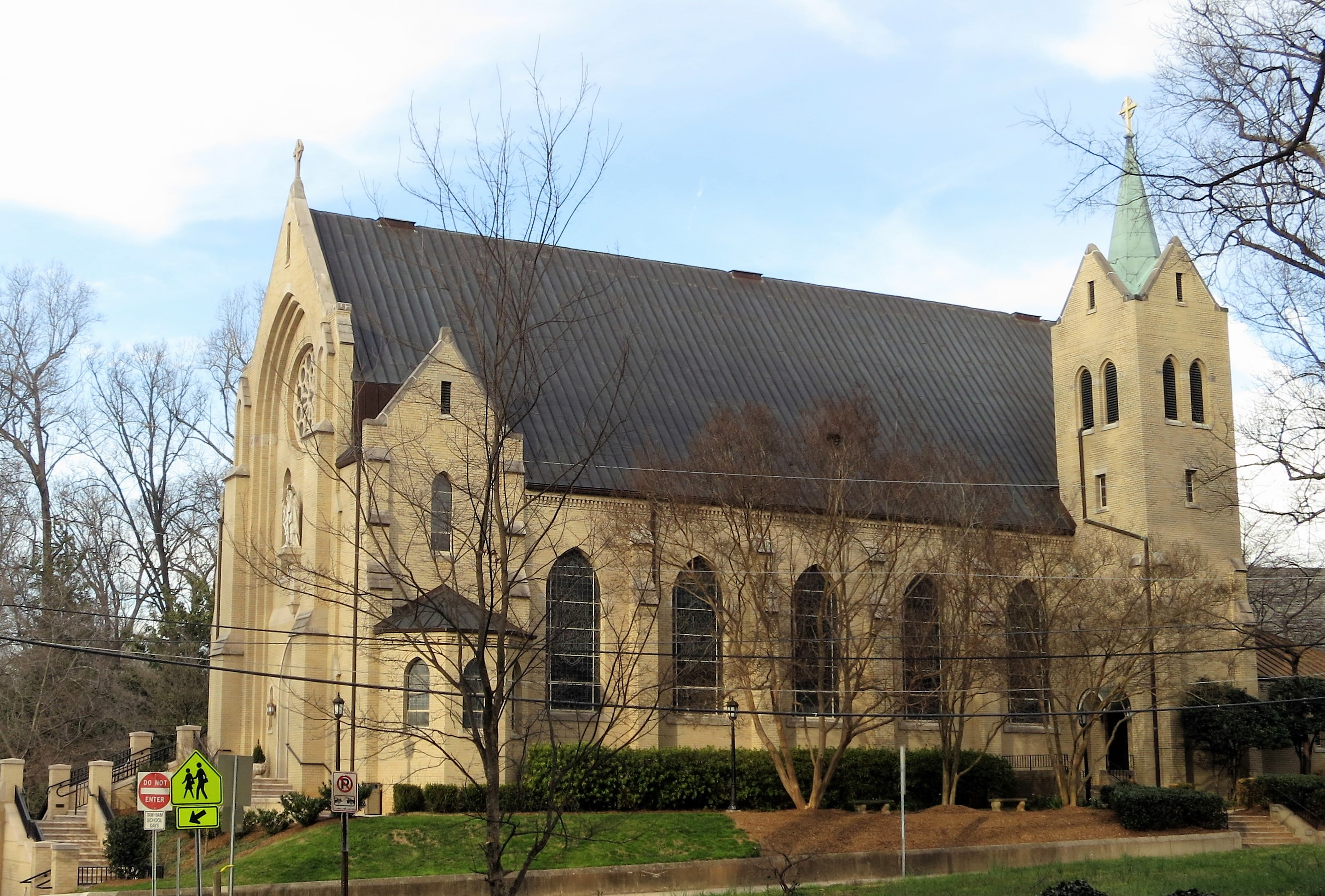
- Side view of the Cathedral

- Location in North Carolina Cathedral of Saint Patrick (the United States)
- 35°12′20″N 80°50′44″W
- Location: 1621 Dilworth Road East Charlotte, North Carolina
- Country: United States
- Denomination: Roman Catholic Church
- Website: www.stpatricks.org

History
- Founded: 1938
- Consecrated: September 4, 1939

Architecture
- Architect: Frank Frimmer
- Style: Neo-Gothic
- Groundbreaking: 1938
- Completed: 1939

Specifications
- Materials: Limestone

Administration
- Diocese: Charlotte

Clergy
- Bishop: Michael Thomas Martin
- Rector: Peter Ascik
- Cathedral of Saint Patrick
- U.S. Historic district – Contributing property
- Part of: Dilworth Historic District (ID87000610)
- Added to NRHP: April 9, 1987

The Cathedral of Saint Patrick is the seat of the Diocese of Charlotte of the Roman Catholic Church in Charlotte, North Carolina, in the United States. It is the mother church of the Diocese of Charlotte and is the seat of its bishop.

== History ==
=== Saint Patrick's Church ===
Saint Patrick's Church in Charlotte was the forerunner of the Cathedral of Saint Patrick. During the early 20th century, Saint Peter's Parish, founded in 1851, was the only one serving Catholics in Charlotte. At that time, the area was under the jurisdiction of the Diocese of Raleigh. By the late 1930s, a second parish was needed in the city to meet the needs of the growing population.

On March 17, 1938, construction began on Saint Patrick, a mission church of Saint Peter's. It was funded by the philanthropist John Henry Phelan. The congregation hired the Austrian architect Frank Frimmer to design the church. Saint Patrick's Church was consecrated on September 4, 1939, by Bishop Eugene J. McGuinness of Raleigh. It became the first Catholic church in North Carolina to be consecrated after its completion. The parish added a rectory and convent to Saint Patrick in 1941. In 1942, the diocese designated Saint Patrick's as a parish, with Monsignor Arthur R. Freeman as pastor.

==== Cathedral of Saint Patrick ====
In 1972, Pope Paul VI erected the Diocese of Charlotte and designated Saint Patrick's Church as the Cathedral of Saint Patrick. Monsignor Richard Allen was appointed as its first rector.

Saint Patrick underwent a major renovation that closed it for six months in 1979. The original high altar, installed by the Benedictines, was replaced with a freestanding altar. The parish also added artwork of local and religious significance. In June 1979, Bishop Michael J. Begley presided over the celebration of St. Patrick's reopening.

In 1996, the parish repositioned the altar, baptismal font, statues and ambo within the cathedral and installed a hardwood floor. They removed dark oak wainscoting installed in 1979 to recreate its appearance from 1939. In 1987, the Cathedral of Saint Patrick was included as a contributing property in the Dilworth Historic District, listed on the National Register of Historic Places.

A permanent copper roof was installed on the cathedral in 2000. In 2007, the parish installed a 700 pounds (320 kg) bell in the bell tower. It was originally cast in 1875 in St. Louis, Missouri. A family life center was added to the church campus in 2008.

In 2012, another renovation relocated the tabernacle, the cathedra and the ambo, The parish removed the marble benches and the carved marble decoration along the center of the back sanctuary wall. They also restored the cover on the baptismal font.The parish created a new main entrance with two staircases in 2013. A Celtic cross was installed on the railing. A Marian grotto was constructed on the cathedral grounds in 2014.

In April 2024, the diocese announced plans to build a new cathedral to replace Saint Patrick due to its low seating capacity. Five months later, the diocese was forced to close the cathedral for several months to repair leaks in the copper roof and address water damage to the plaster walls in the building. They also used the shutdown to add gold leaf to the stations of the cross and the arches.

The diocese postponed its plans for a new cathedral in July 2025. They decided to instead raise money to assist parishes that had suffered hurricane damage. In addition, they learned that since the proposed site was outside the Charlotte city limits, it could not be designated as the see of Charlotte.

== Architectural features ==
=== Description ===
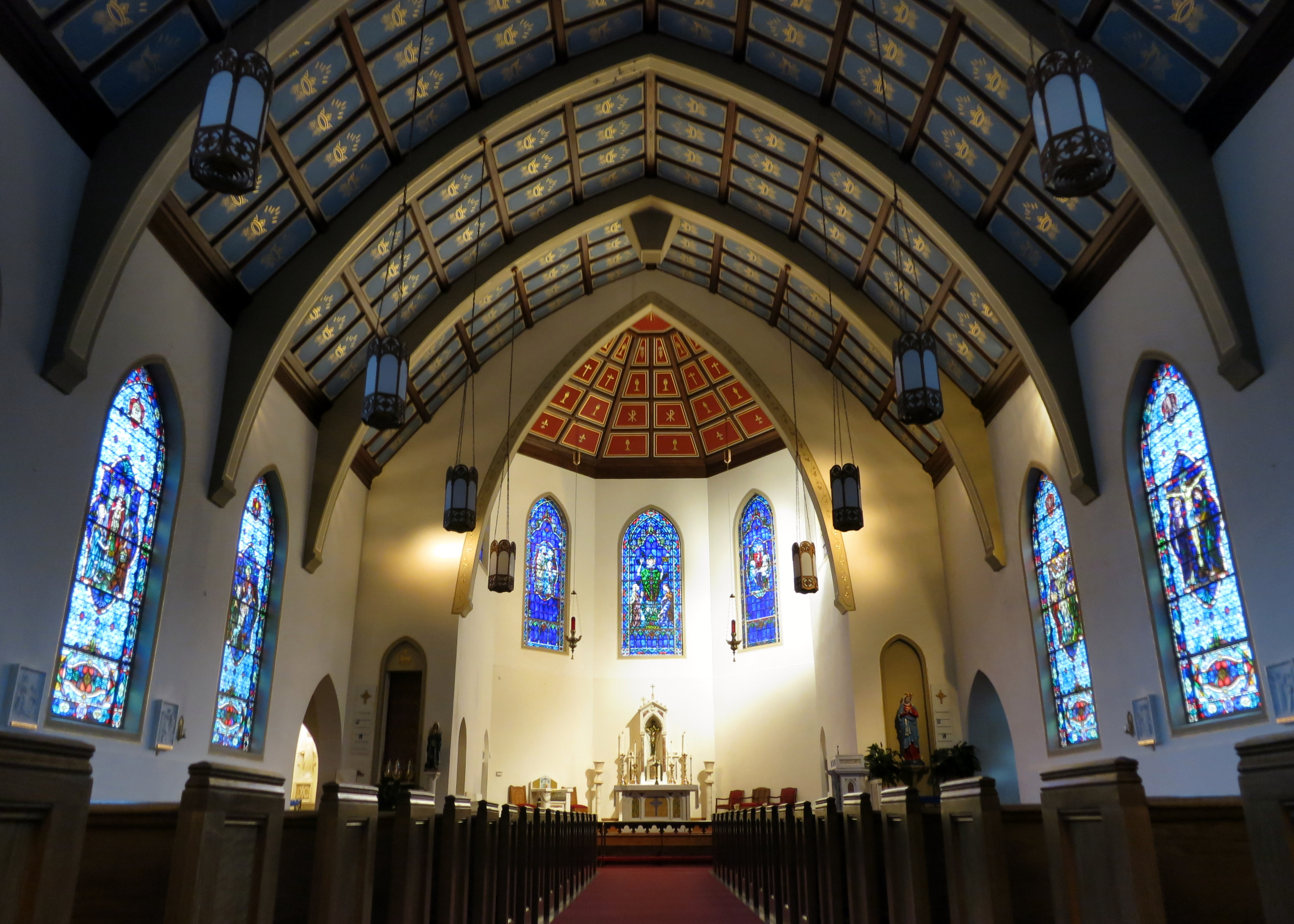
Nave and main altar (2016)

Saint Patrick has a gray stucco face and a 77-foot (23.7m) bell tower. The nave seats 400 worshippers. The cathedral has two side chapels, serving as shrines to the Blessed Virgin Mary and Saint Joseph. The ceiling has 300 tiles.

The main altar contains relics of Saint Jucundus and Justina of Padua, a Roman saint and martyr of the 4th century CE. The balcony contains the pipe organ, designed and manufactured by W. Zimmer and Sons of Fort Mill, South Carolina. It replaced the original Moller pipe organ.

=== Stained glass windows ===
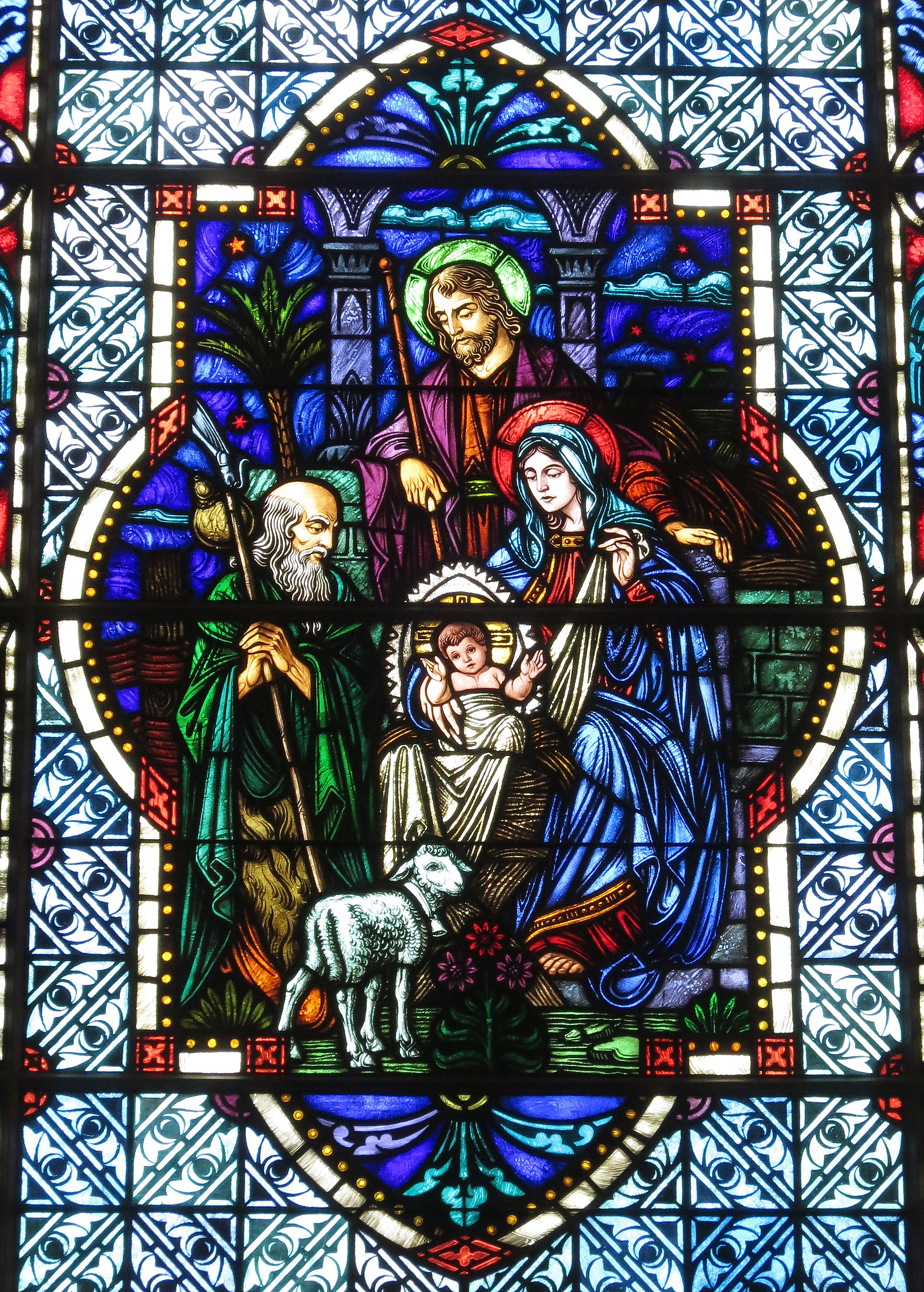
Nativity of Jesus (2016)

The stained glass windows were designed at the Henry Keck Studios in Syracuse, New York. They depict the following biblical scenes:

- Annunciation of the Lord Jesus to Mary
- Saint Patrick – British bishop in Ireland in the 5th Century
- Death of Saint Joseph – husband of Mary, mother of Jesus
- David – reported king of Israel in the 9th century BCE
- Cecilia of Rome – Roman martyr and saint of the 2nd century CE.

A second set of stained glass windows depict scenes from the life of Jesus:

- The nativity of Jesus
- The presentation of Jesus at the temple of Jerusalem
- The finding of Jesus in the temple
- Jesus blessing the children
- Jesus with the rich young man
- Jesus healing the blind
- Jesus and Mary Magdalene
- The agony of Jesus in the Garden of Gethsemanes
- The crucifixion of Jesus
- The ascension of Jesus into heaven
Cathedral images

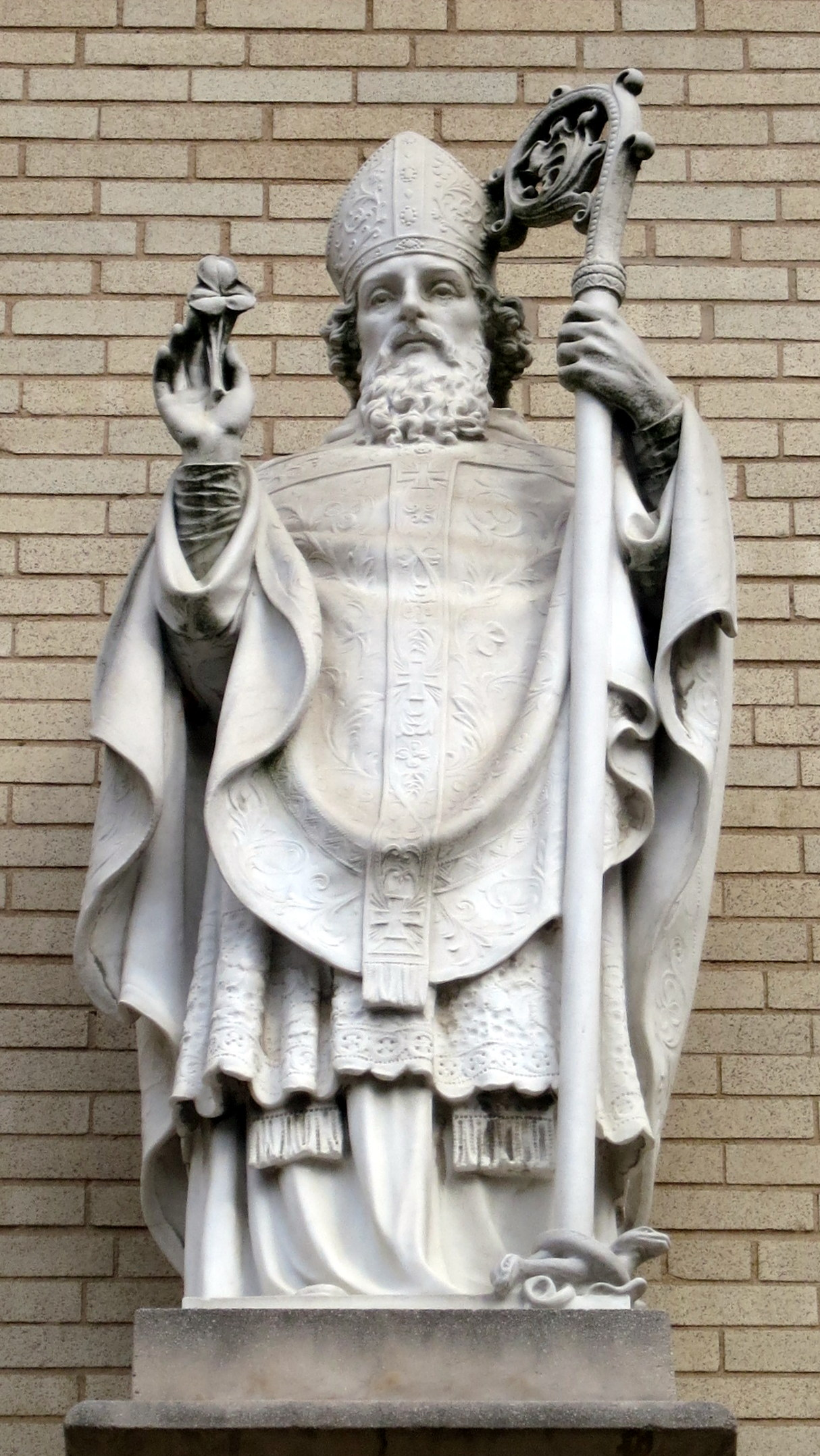
Statue of Saint Patrick (2016)

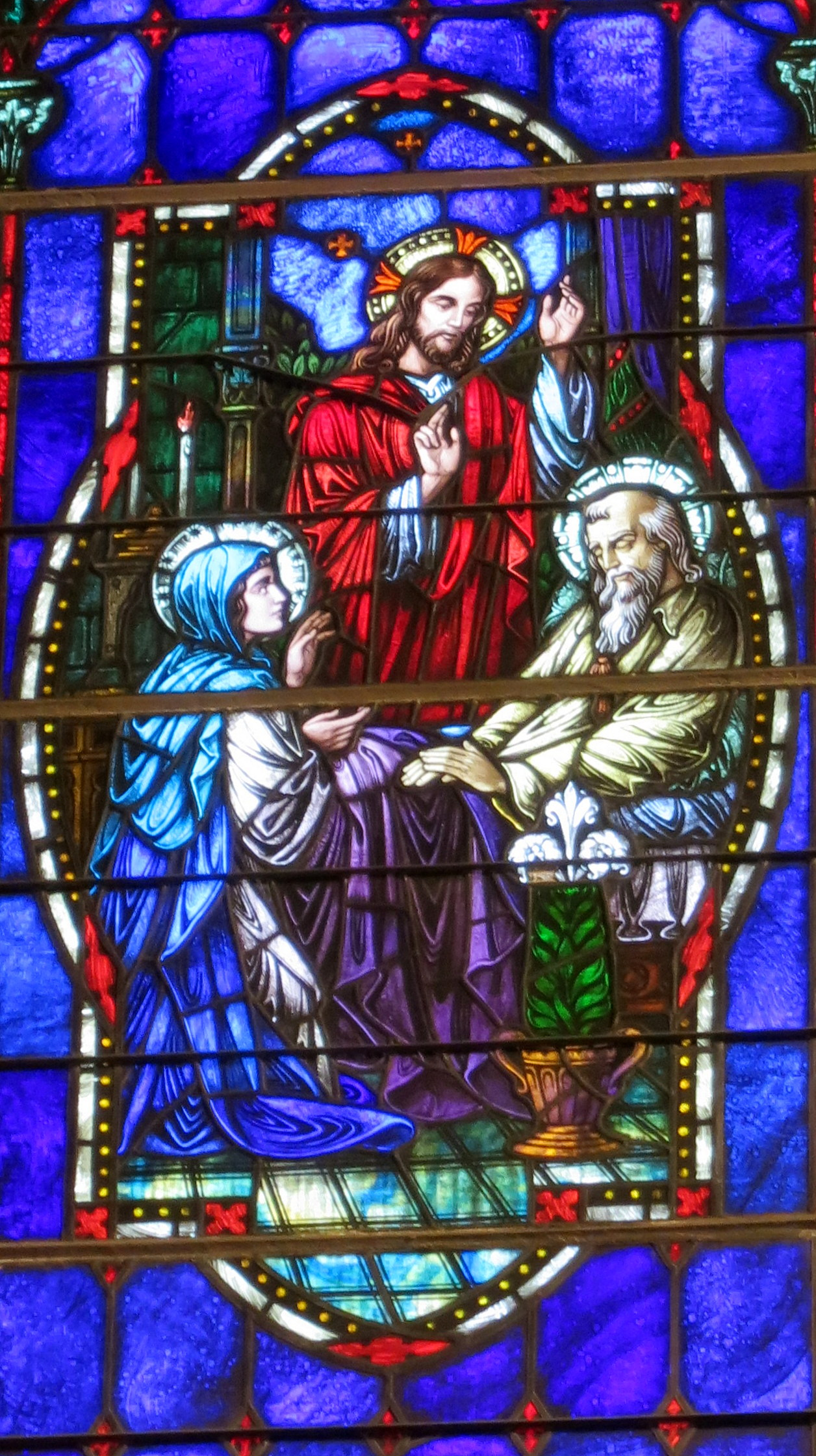
Death of Saint Joseph stained glass window (2016)

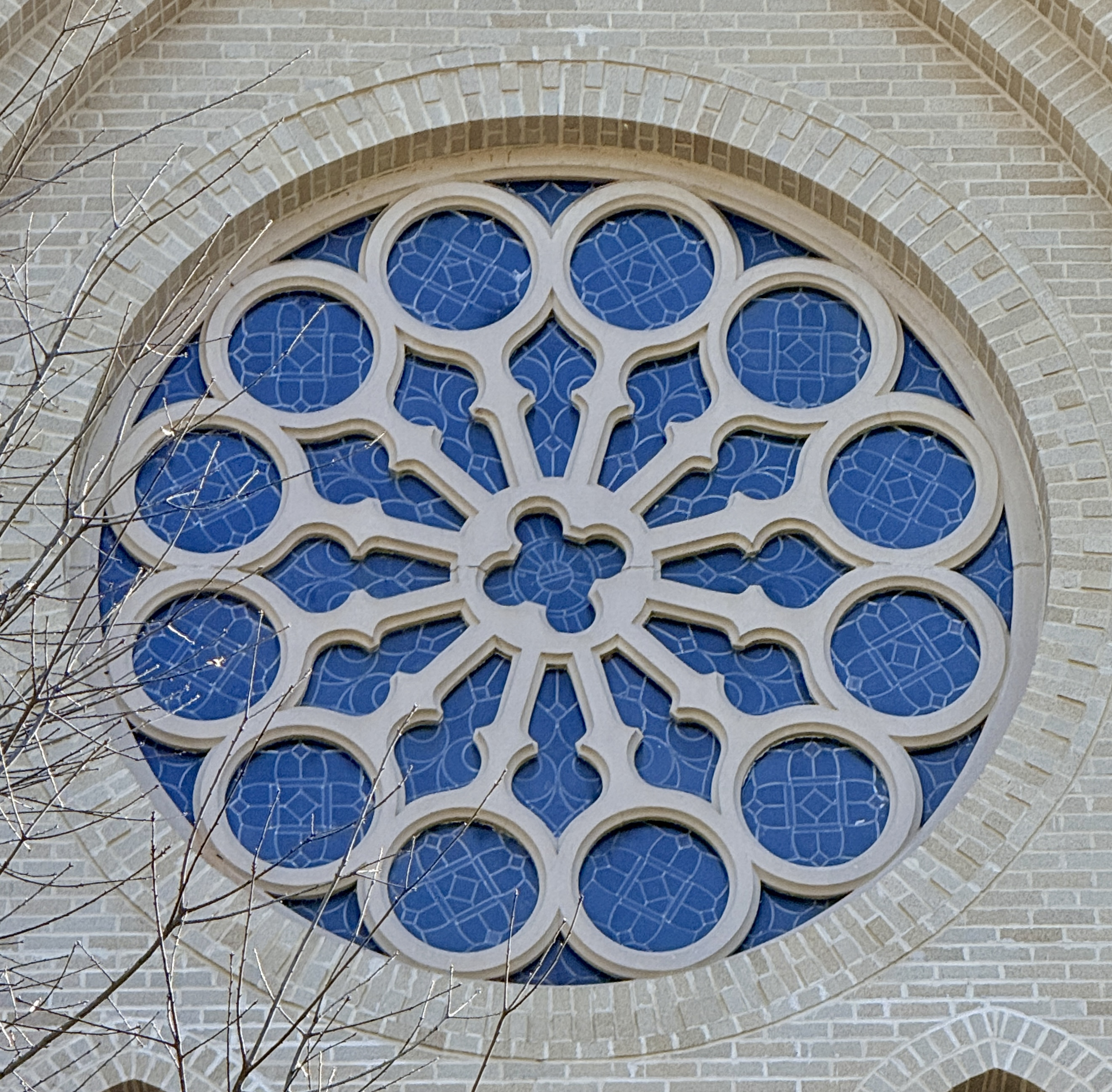
Roundel window (2026)

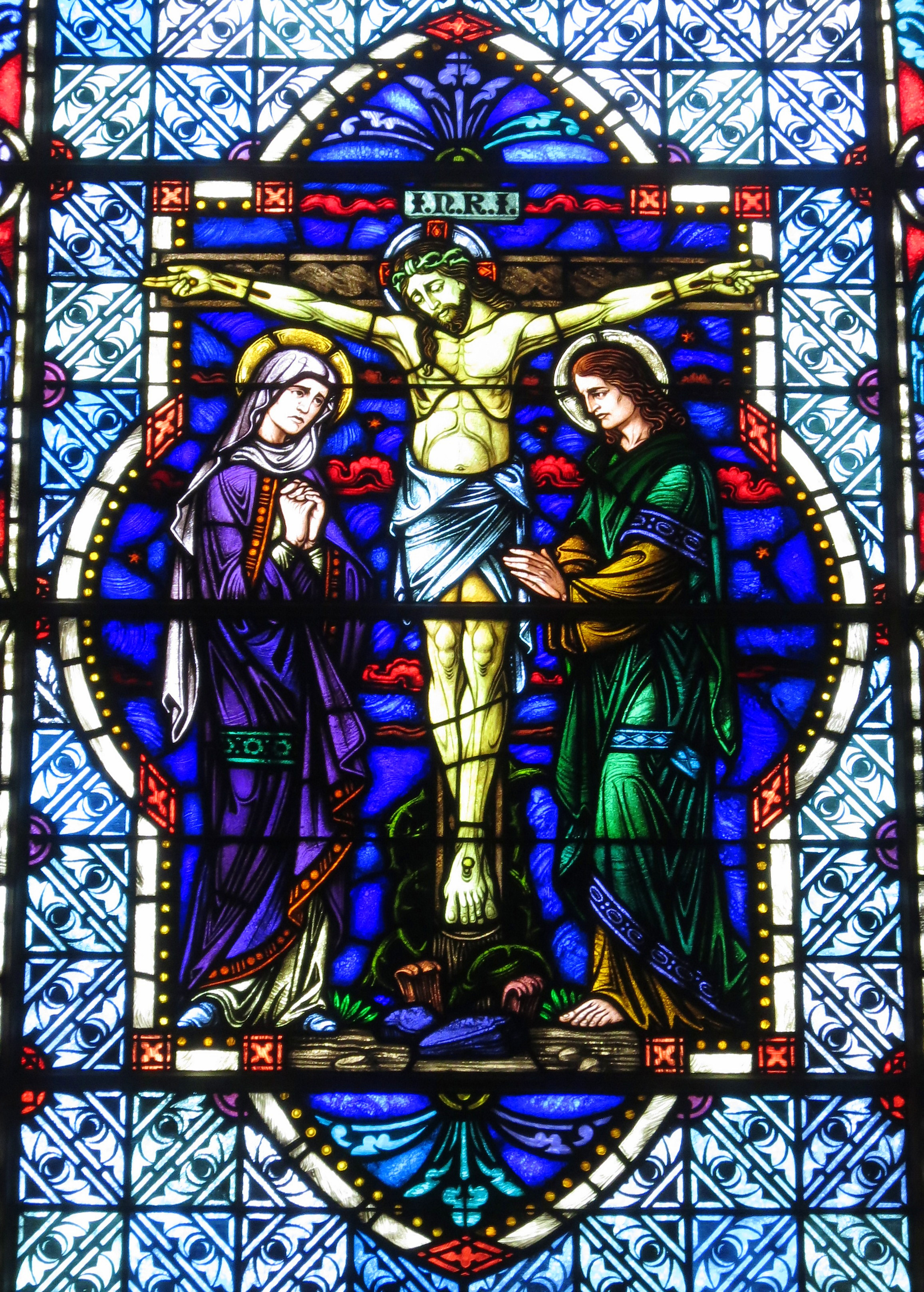
Crucifixion stained glass window (2016

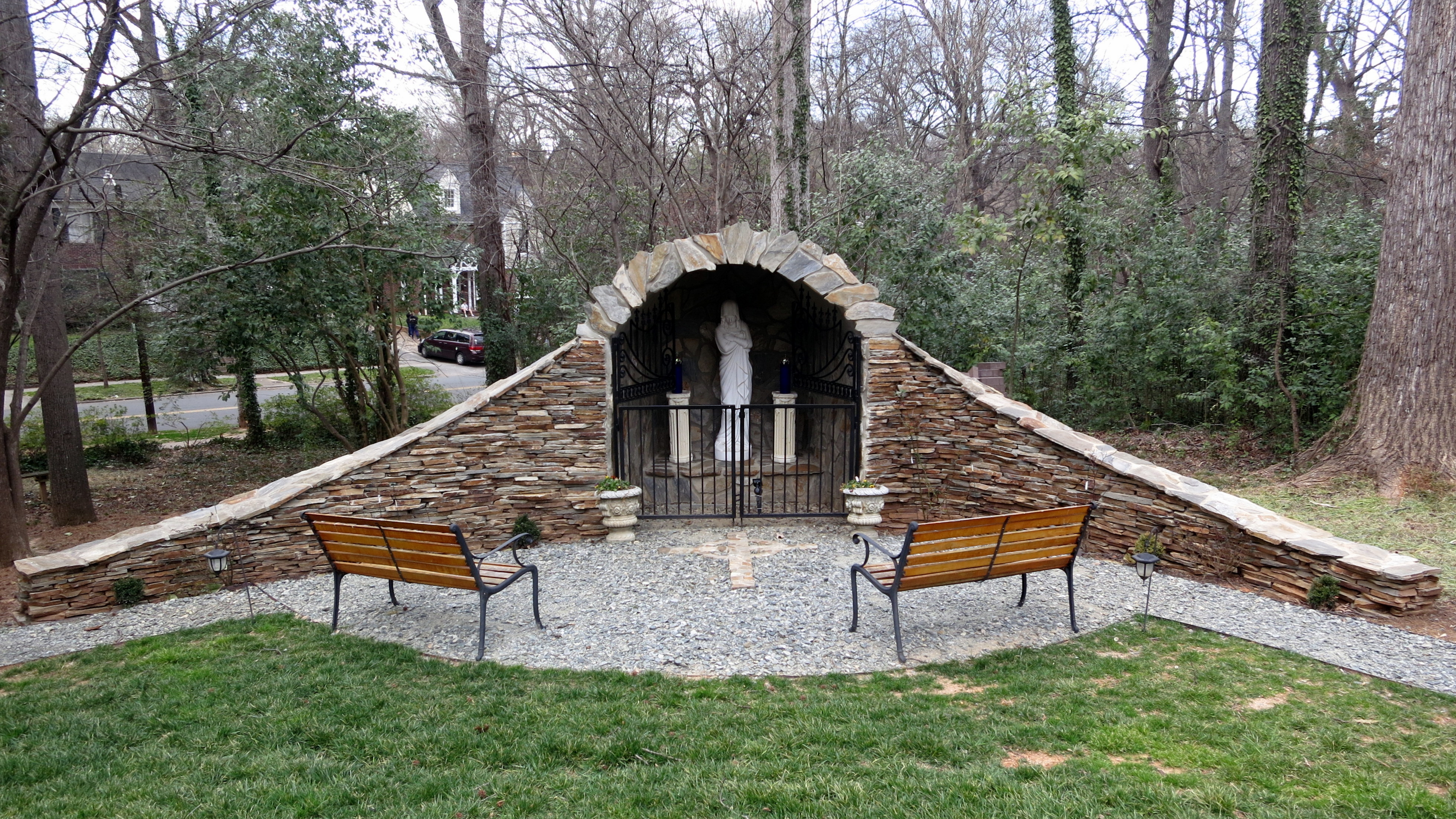
Marian grotto (2016)

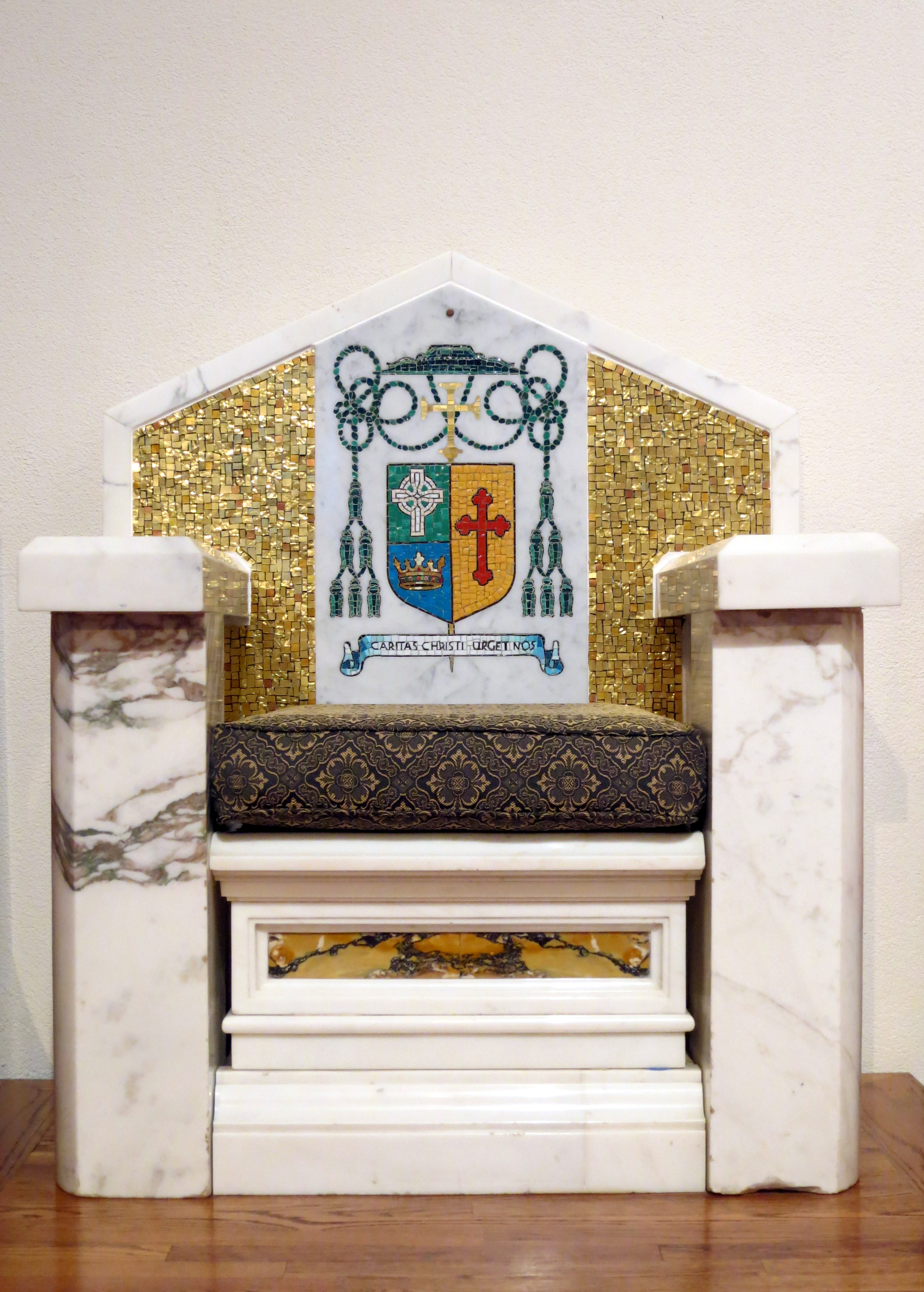
Cathedra (2016)

== See also ==
- List of Catholic cathedrals in the United States
- List of cathedrals in the United States
