= St. Joseph's Catholic Church (Mountain Island, North Carolina) =

Historic church in North Carolina, United States

- U.S. National Register of Historic Places
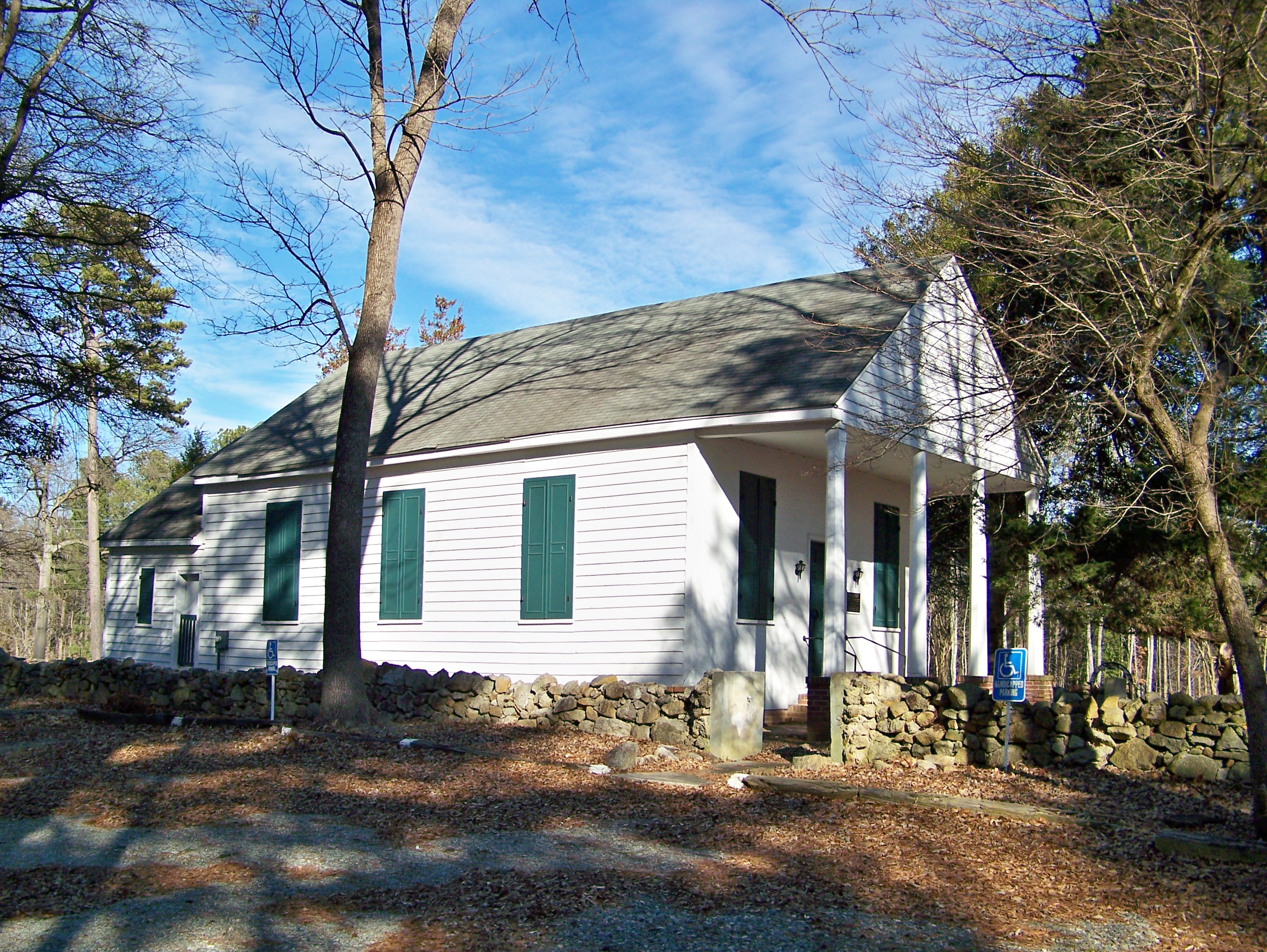

- Location within North Carolina Location within the United States
- Location: Off NC 273, near Mount Holly, North Carolina
- Coordinates: 35°20′12″N 81°00′01″W
- Area: 1.8 acres (0.73 ha)
- Built: 1844
- Architectural style: Greek Revival
- NRHP reference No.: 79001709
- Added to NRHP: June 7, 1979

St. Joseph's Catholic Church is a historic church located near Mount Holly, North Carolina, Gaston County, North Carolina. It was the fourth Catholic church built in North Carolina, the first west of Raleigh, and the first in what is today the Diocese of Charlotte. Built to serve the Irish miners in the area, it underwent a long period of neglect until restoration efforts began in the mid-20th century. Today it is operated as a mission church of Queen of the Apostles Church in Belmont.

== History ==
Chevalier Riva de Finola established gold mines in the region starting in the 1830s, and many Irish immigrants came to the area to work in the mines. At first, they worshipped at de Finola's home, but he left in 1835 after a court ordered his mines closed. John England, Bishop of Charleston, assigned missionary Fr. T.J. Cronin to serve the miners in 1838, and he quickly began fundraising to build a church near what would become Mount Holly. In 1841, one of the miners, William Lonergan, donated six acres of land in what was then Lincoln County for the construction. Lonergan did not live to see the church completed, and was buried in 1842 on the site, the first burial in what would become St. Joseph's Cemetery; Cronin died of yellow fever the same year, and his body was moved to St. Joseph's in 1843.

The simple wooden church, dedicated to Saints Mary and Joseph, was completed in 1843 and dedicated by a Fr. J.J. O'Connell, another missionary. Early records of church activities were lost in 1861 when the archives of the Diocese of Charleston were lost in the Great Fire of Charleston. O'Connell returned to serve as parish priest 1870–77, and in 1871, he purchased 500 acres of land from the Caldwell family. This land was eventually accepted by the Benedictines at Saint Vincent Archabbey in Pennsylvania, who arrived in 1876 and established what is today Belmont Abbey.

After O'Connell's departure, however, regular services ceased. The construction of St. Peter's in Charlotte and losses and disruption from the American Civil War contributed to declining parish rolls. Eventually, the entire congregation shifted to the Abbey, and the church underwent a long period of neglect.

The church underwent a long period of neglect. It was restored in 1974 thanks to a fundraising effort led by Francis Galligan of Gastonia. It was rededicated the following year by Bishop Michael Joseph Begley, and in 1979 was listed on the National Register of Historic Places. A small group of volunteers led by Carl Heil has looked after the property since 1993.

In 2001, a statue of Saint Joseph that had stood outside St. Joseph's Hospital in Asheville was moved to the site.

== Architecture ==
Completed in 1844, the structure a vernacular temple-form, Greek Revival style frame church clad in white clapboard. It has a gable roof and its front facade features a tetrastyle portico.

The interior of the church has a simple center aisle plan, finished with wood molding. As of 2005, about 70 percent of the window glass was original, and the flooring of the church is original planking as well.

The church was listed on the National Register of Historic Places in 1979.
