= St. Benedict Catholic Church (Greensboro, North Carolina) =

Church building in Greensboro, NC, USA

Saint Benedict Catholic Church
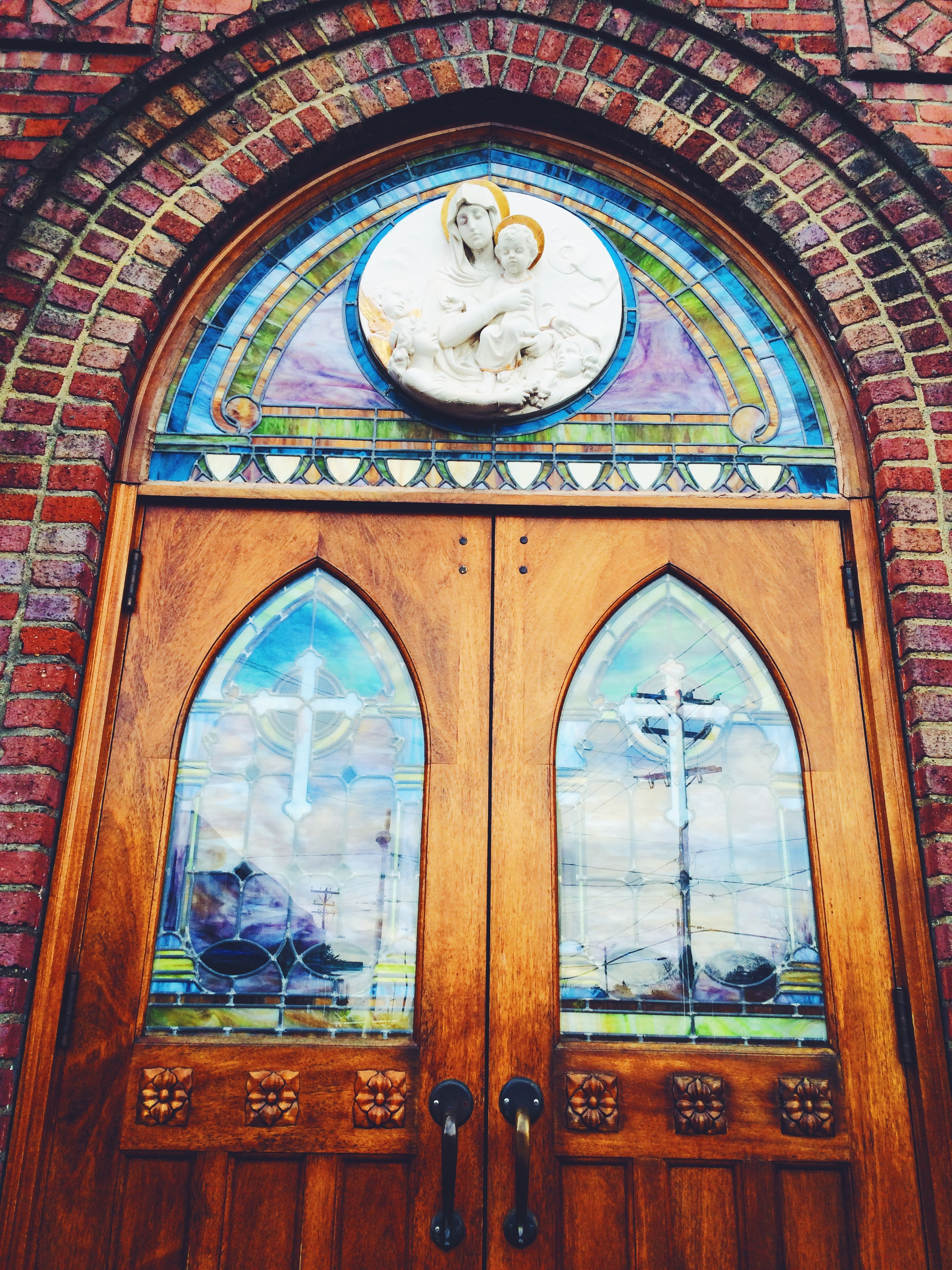
- Front doors of St. Benedict's

Religion
- Affiliation: Roman Catholic Church
- Diocese: Roman Catholic Diocese of Charlotte
- Rite: Latin Rite
- Leadership: Bishop Michael Thomas Martin

Location
- Location: 109 West Smith Street, Greensboro, North Carolina, United States 27401-2027
- State: North Carolina
- Interactive map of Saint Benedict Catholic Church
- Coordinates: 36°4′42.7″N 79°47′24.4″W

Architecture
- Groundbreaking: 1877

St. Benedict Catholic Church is a Catholic church in downtown Greensboro, North Carolina. As the oldest Catholic church in Greensboro and one of the oldest churches in the Diocese of Charlotte, St. Benedict's is considered the Catholic mother church of the city.

== History ==
The very first Catholic Mass celebrated in Greensboro dates back to the 1870s. Very few Catholics lived in Greensboro at the time and traveling Benedictine priests from Belmont Abbey would come to provide Sacraments in the homes of Catholics. The first Catholic church, named St. Anne's and later St. Benedict's in honor of the Benedictine priests who served the Greensboro community, began construction in 1877 with the cornerstone being laid by Bishop James Gibbons of Richmond. The original church building was sold to the city of Greensboro in 1899 and became the Greensboro High School, the first public high school in Greensboro, now known as Grimsley Senior High School.

A new plot of land, between North Elm and Smith Streets, was purchased and is the current location of the church. St. Katherine Drexel, who was canonized in 2000 by Pope John Paul II, gave St. Benedict's Church $1,500 to help build the current church building, with the condition that a certain amount of pews would be reserved for African-American parishioners, encouraging the church to have an integrated congregation during the time of racial segregation in the southern United States. St. Benedict's used to have a Catholic school, which later was merged with St. Pius X Catholic School.
