= Curlin (surname) =

Curlin is a surname. Notable people with the surname include:

- William G. Curlin (1927–2017), American Roman Catholic bishop
- William P. Curlin Jr. (born 1933), American politician and lawyer
- Zach Curlin (1890–1970), American football and basketball player and coach
