= Chancellor (ecclesiastical) =

Ecclesiastic title

Chancellor is an ecclesiastical title used by several quite distinct officials of some Christian churches. In some churches, the chancellor of a diocese is a lawyer who represents the church in legal matters.

== Catholic Church ==
In the Catholic Church a chancellor is the chief record-keeper of a diocese or eparchy or their equivalent. Normally a priest, sometimes a deacon or layperson, the chancellor keeps the official archives of the diocese, as a notary certifies documents, and generally manages the administrative offices (and sometimes finances and personnel) of a diocese. They may be assisted by vice-chancellors. Though they manage the paperwork and office (called the "chancery"), they have no actual jurisdictional authority: the bishop of the diocese exercises decision-making authority through his judicial vicar, in judicial matters, and the vicar general for administrative matters.

== Church of England ==
In the Church of England, the Chancellor is the judge of the consistory court of the diocese. The office of diocesan chancellor technically combines that of Official Principal (who presides over, and represents the bishop in, the consistory court) with that of Vicar General (who acts as the bishop's deputy in non-judicial legal and administrative affairs). The office was also known historically in some dioceses as Commissary or Commissary General, and Commissary General remains the usual title in the Diocese of Canterbury.

In Church of England cathedrals, the Canon Chancellor (more usually known simply as the Chancellor) is one of the canons of the cathedral who has a particular responsibility for matters of education and scholarship, often acting as the cathedral librarian and archivist. The Chancellor is generally one of four chief dignitaries in the cathedral chapter, the others being the Dean, the Precentor and the Treasurer.

== Methodism ==
In the United Methodist Church, each Annual Conference has a Conference Chancellor, who is either an active or retired lawyer or judge who serves as the Annual Conference's legal adviser and representative. While the Annual Conference will usually hire outside professional counsel in legal matters requiring legal representation, that hiring and representation is done under the supervision, and with the consent, of the Conference Chancellor.

== See also ==
- Chancellor#Ecclesiastical position
- Catholic Church hierarchy#Positions within a diocese at diocesan level
