= St. Matthew Catholic Church (Charlotte, North Carolina) =

Church in Charlotte, North Carolina

Coordinates: 35°3′22″N 80°48′50″W

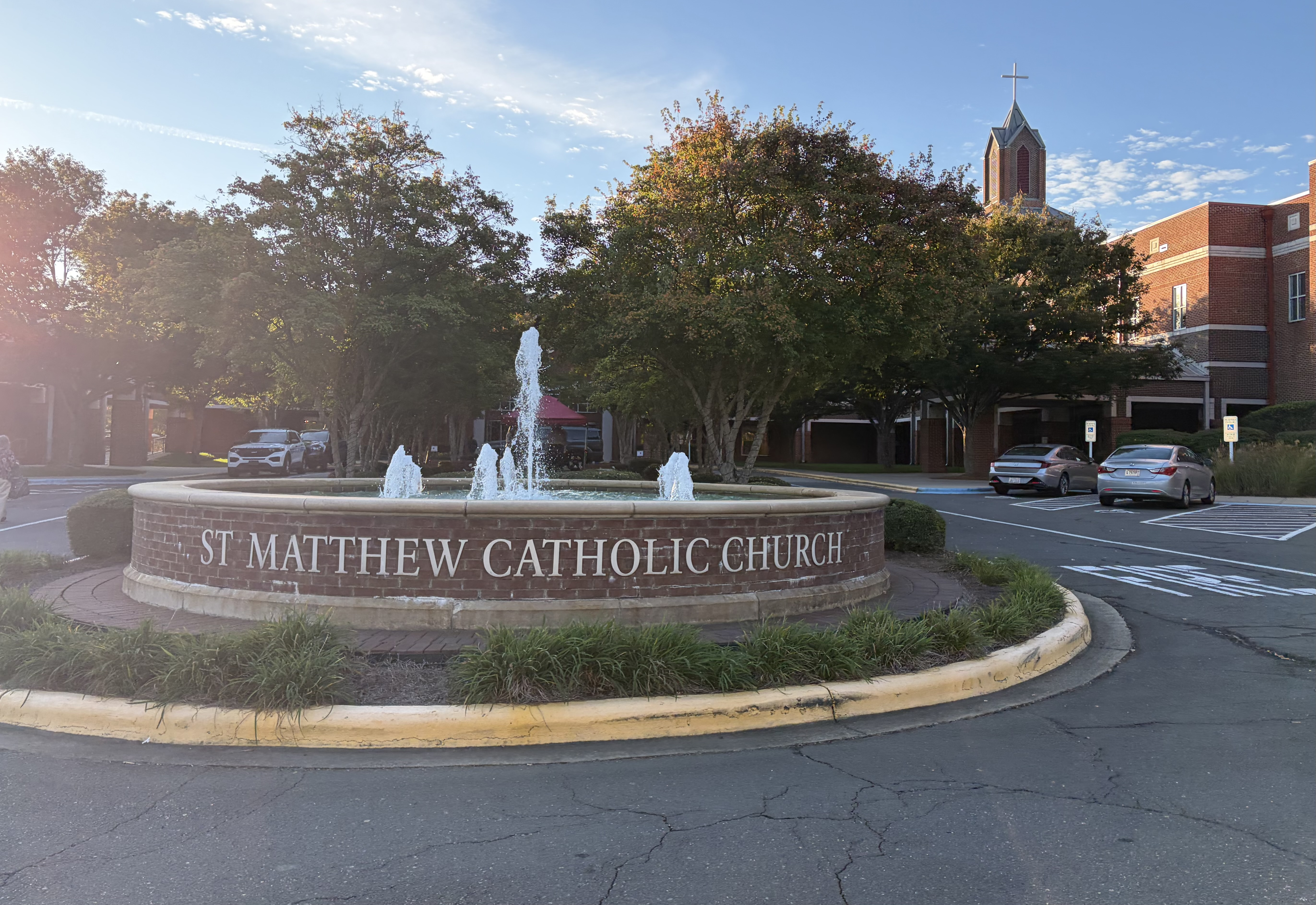

Religion
- Affiliation: Catholic Church
- Diocese: Roman Catholic Diocese of Charlotte
- Rite: Latin Rite
- Leadership: Bishop Michael Thomas Martin

Location
- Location: 8015 Ballantyne Commons Parkway; Charlotte, North Carolina, U.S.
- State: North Carolina
- Interactive map of St. Matthew Catholic Church

Website
- stmatthewcatholic.org

St. Matthew Catholic Church is a Catholic parish in the Ballantyne neighborhood of Charlotte, North Carolina, in the Diocese of Charlotte. As of 2017, it was one of the largest Catholic parishes in the United States, with over 10,500 registered families and more than 12,000 weekly attendees.

== History ==
On September 21, 1986, the Roman Catholic Diocese of Charlotte announced the plan for a new church. The congregation, then made up of 237 families, originally met for Mass in the Tower Theater.

In 2017 St. Matthew's had 35,599 registered members, making up 13.7 percent of the entire population of the Diocese of Charlotte. It has been described as a Catholic megachurch. St. Matthew's clergy and staff reportedly observed ministerial methods and management strategies from Protestant evangelical megachurches, including Saddleback Church. The church operates a satellite campus in Waxhaw, called St. Matthew South. Until 2023, when it was overtaken by St. Charles Borromeo in Visalia, St Matthew's was the largest Catholic parish church in the United States.

The church, which is run by the Order of Friars Minor Capuchin, claims to be welcoming to divorced Catholics as well as LGBTQ Catholics, and emphasizes the teachings and culture of the Second Vatican Council.

In 1999 Fr. Robert Yurgel, a priest at St. Matthew's, sexually abused a fourteen-year-old altar boy. Yurgel was removed from the Capuchin order and defrocked from the Catholic priesthood in 2010. He was arrested in 2009 after pleading guilty to a second-degree sexual offense.
