= Christ the King Catholic High School (North Carolina) =

Private school in North Carolina, US

Location
- 2011 Crusader Way; Huntersville, North Carolina 28078; United States; 35°26′39″N 80°45′37″W

Information
- Type: Private, Coeducational
- Motto: Crede, Cogita, Servi
- Religious affiliation: Roman Catholic
- Founded: 2011 (15 years ago)
- Authority: MACS
- Oversight: Diocese of Charlotte
- CEEB code: 342694
- Dean: Susan Bukowski
- Administrator: Shaileen Riginos
- Principal: Mark J. Tolcher
- Chaplain: Father John Cuppett
- Grades: 9–12
- Student to teacher ratio: 8:1
- Campus size: 100+ Acres
- Houses: Tempest, Knight's Watch, Glory, and Regalis
- Colors: Royal blue and silver
- Athletics: NCHSAA 2A
- Athletics conference: Catawba Shores 2A/3A/4A
- Sports: Basketball, Tennis, Golf, Swimming, Diving, Cheerleading, Volleyball, Baseball, Softball, Soccer, Football, Lacrosse, Cross-Country, Wrestling, Indoor/Outdoor Track & Field
- Mascot: Crusader
- Team name: Crusaders
- Accreditation: Southern Association of Colleges and Schools
- Tuition: 11,352$ (practicing Catholic) 16,232$ (non-practicing Catholic)
- Website: www.ctkchs.org

Christ the King Catholic High School is a private, college-prep, Roman Catholic high school in Huntersville, North Carolina, United States. It operates under the direction of the Roman Catholic Diocese of Charlotte.

== Background ==
Christ the King was founded in 2011. The mascot is the Crusader.

== Athletics ==
Christ the King Catholic High School is a member of the North Carolina High School Athletic Association (NCHSAA) and are classified as a 2A school. The school is a part of the Catawba Shores 2A/3A/4A Conference.

Christ the King offers a variety of sports programs. Here is a list of notable athletic achievements:

- Between 2017-2018, the Christ the King swim team won both the men and women's 1A/2A NCISAA State Swimming Championships
- Between 2021-2022, the Men's Soccer team won the 1A NCHSAA State Soccer Championship
- In 2022, the Women's Soccer team won their 1A NCHSAA State Soccer Championship
- In 2023, Blake Nicholson won the 1A NCHSAA State Track and Field Championship in the Cross Country and 3200M events

== History ==
In December 2018, the school held the ribbon cutting for a brand new addition to the original school building, which houses more classrooms and a cafeteria for students.

== See also ==
- List of high schools in North Carolina
- National Catholic Educational Association
