= St. Charles Borromeo (Visalia) =

- St. Charles Borromeo
- 36.2972°N 119.3467°W
- Location: Visalia
- Country: United States
- Denomination: Catholic Church
- Sui iuris church: Latin Church
- Website: www.stcharlesvisalia.org

History
- Status: active
- Founded: February 2, 2023
- Dedication: Charles Borromeo
- Dedicated: February 2, 2023

Architecture
- Architect: Marc Russell
- Style: Mission Revival
- Groundbreaking: 2011
- Construction cost: $21 million

Specifications
- Capacity: 3,148 seats

Administration
- Diocese: Fresno
- Parish: Good Shepherd parish, Visalia

Clergy
- Pastor: Alex Chavez

St. Charles Borromeo is a Roman Catholic church in Visalia, California, United States. It opened in 2023. The church is the largest Catholic parish church in North America, seating 3148 worshippers. It is built in the Mission Revival style with large artworks inside. Construction cost $21 million. It serves 14,000 families as part of a larger parish with three other churches, hosting three mass services on Sundays.

== History ==
The population of Visalia grew rapidly during the 20th and early 21st centuries, including its Catholic population; between 1980 and 2023, the Diocese of Fresno increased from 307,000 to 1.2 million Catholics. At the same time, there has been a priest shortage, leading to church and parish consolidation. Before the construction of St. Charles, eleven masses and three priests were needed to serve the population; only 1250 seats were available across the Good Shepherd parish. With the new church, the number of services needed is reduced to five and two priests suffice. A large church in a central location had been a diocesan ambition for some time. The land was purchased by the diocese beginning in the 1940s, in anticipation of population growth; some was sold in 2006 to raise funds for the project.

Construction began in 2011 and the church opened on February 2, 2023, holding its dedication mass on that date, which was attended by 3200 people. The Bishop of Fresno, Joseph Vincent Brennan, led the service. The initial building of the church cost $21 million, from diocesan funds and parishioner contribution; more work to be done after the initial phase, to be supported by additional fundraising, includes installing stained glass, shrines to Our Lady of Guadalupe and Our Lady of Fatima, and an outdoor garden with native plants. After its opening, services have been very well attended, with some travelling to the church from throughout California. At its completion, it surpassed the previous highest-capacity Catholic parish church in the United States, St Matthew in Charlotte, by almost 1000 seats.

== Architecture ==
The church can seat 3148. It is the largest Catholic parish church in North America. Its design evokes the architecture of the California missions in the Mission Revival style. Marc Russell of Radian Design Group was the church's architect. The interior decorations were designed by Rolf Rohn and painted by Mural Arts, who also painted the Caesars Palace casino. It has an open interior with clear sight lines to the altar. There are three bells, though they do not sound, and which represent the Trinity.

Its nave is 82 feet (25 m) wide, and the church covers 34,000 square feet (3,200 m^{2}); the dome is 98 feet (30 m) wide and 66 feet (20 m) high. The cupola is painted with a depiction of the creation of the universe, derived from a photograph taken by the Hubble Space Telescope. The reredos is decorated with angels, saints and local pastoral scenes. To fit the size of the church, the painted figures are life-size, and a crucifix behind the altar has a 7 feet (2.1 m) tall Jesus sculpture. Bishop Brennan said that the church "creates an environment that makes you think of the Eucharist".

== Worship ==
Alex Chavez is the church's pastor. It is part of the Good Shepherd parish, which is made up of St. Charles, two other churches in Visalia, and one in Goshen, that serves approximately 14,000 families. Mass at St. Charles is only held on Sundays, with two services in Spanish and one in English.

Saints whose relics are housed in the church include Peter the Apostle, Thomas Becket and Faustina Kowalski. The church is dedicated to Charles Borromeo.

== Bibliography ==
- Brennan, Robert (February 13, 2023). "Notes from the birth of North America's biggest parish". Angelus.
- Graves, Jim (March 5, 2023). "St. Charles Borromeo Church 'Creates an Environment Which Makes You Think of the Eucharist'". National Catholic Register.
- Navarro, Elisa (February 3, 2023). "St. Charles Borromeo Church now open in Visalia". ABC 30 (KFSN-TV).
- Ortiz-Briones, Maria G. (August 15, 2022). "The US's largest Catholic parish is opening in Visalia. Look inside the $21 million church". The Fresno Bee.
- Seed, John (February 20, 2023). "The Art in America's Largest Catholic Parish Church". Hyperallergic.
- Wainwright, Oliver (February 3, 2023). "'Our own little Vatican': inside the biggest Catholic parish church in North America". The Guardian.
