= St. Peter's Catholic Church (Charlotte, North Carolina) =

Church in North Carolina, US

Coordinates: 35.2241°N 80.8476°W

St. Peter’s Catholic Church
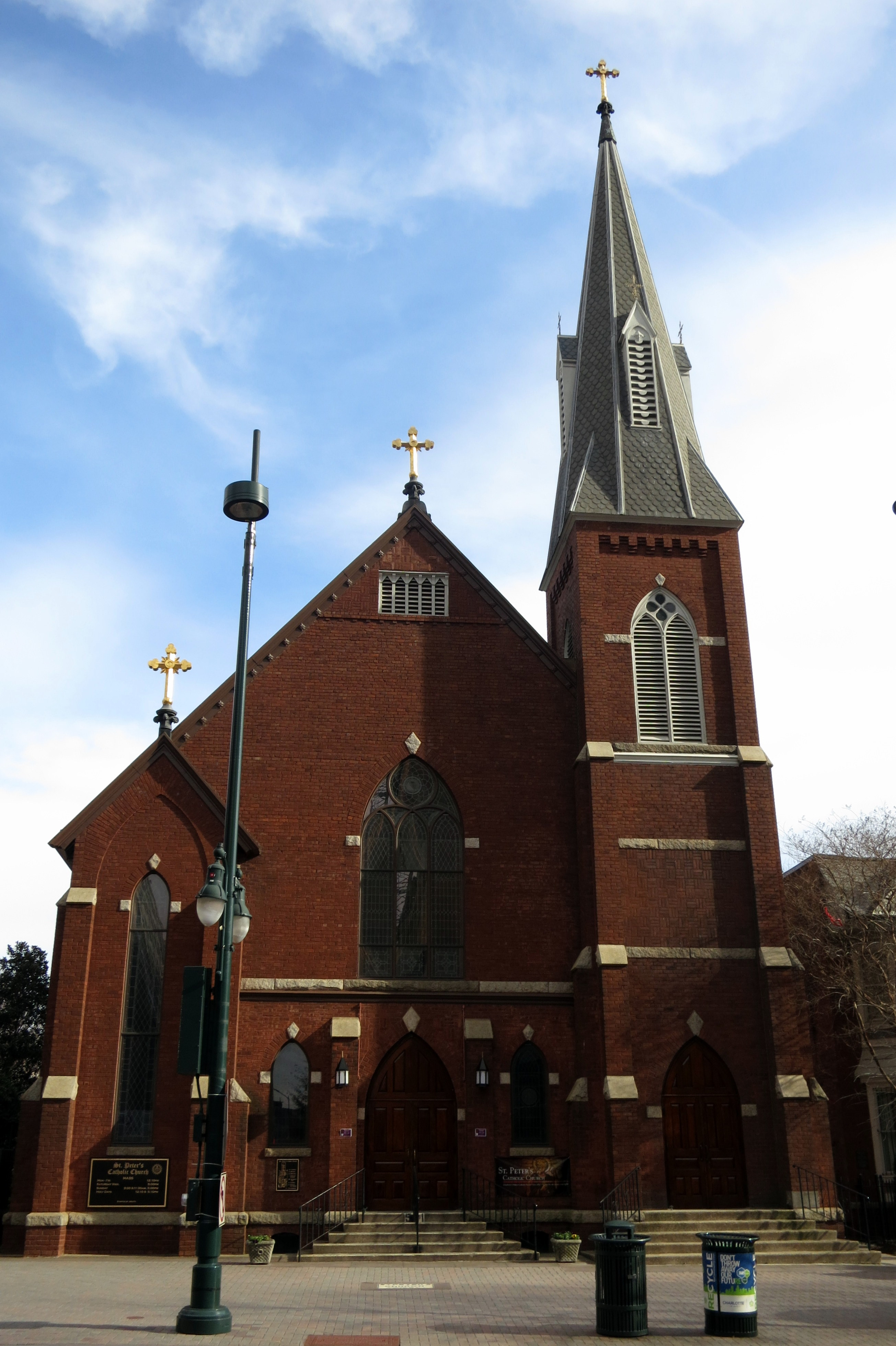
- Saint Peter’s Catholic Church (Charlotte, North Carolina)
- St. Peter’s Catholic Church
- Location: 507 South Tryon Street; Charlotte, North Carolina
- Country: United States
- Denomination: Catholic Church
- Website: St. Peter's website

History
- Founded: 1851

Architecture
- Architect: Charles A. Hastings
- Architectural type: Gothic Revival architecture
- Completed: 1893

Administration
- Province: Atlanta
- Diocese: Charlotte
- Parish: St. Peter

Clergy
- Bishop: Most Rev. Michael Thomas Martin
- Vicar(s): Rev. Mark P. Scalese, S.J.
- Pastor(s): Rev. Timothy J. Stephens, S.J.

St. Peter’s Catholic Church is a Catholic parish church at 507 South Tryon Street in Charlotte, North Carolina. Established in 1851, it is the oldest Catholic church in Charlotte, and until 1940 was the only Catholic church in the city. St. Peter's was originally at the extreme southern limits of the city, but today it stands in the heart of uptown, across from the Mint Museum and Bechtler Museum of Modern Art and next to The Green. It is most likely the oldest surviving edifice on Tryon Street.

The original structure stood from 1851 until 1892. The building was damaged during the civil war and in 1892 was deemed structurally unsafe. The present structure, in a simplified Victorian Gothic style rendered in dark brick, dates from 1893.

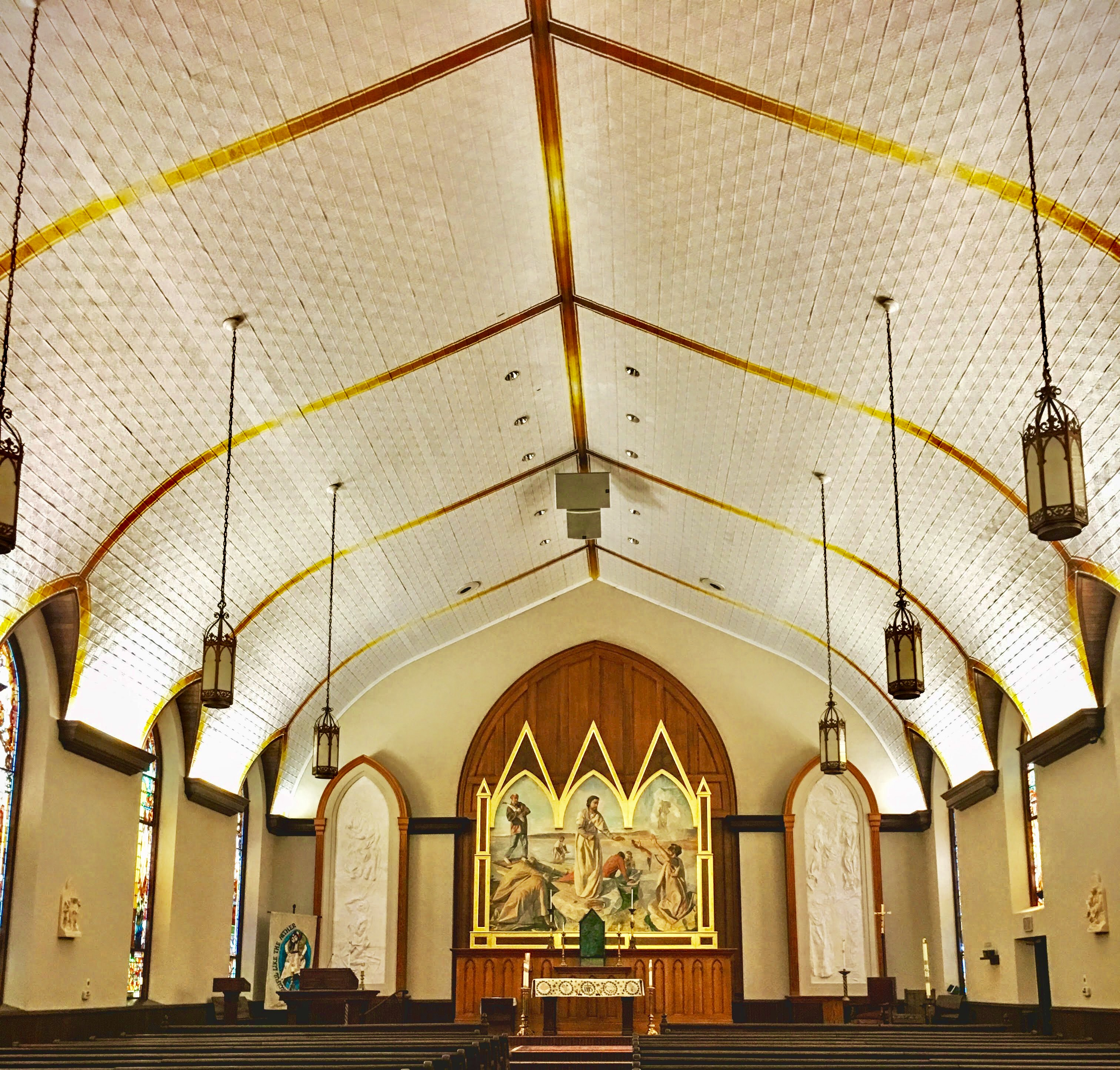
Interior of the church

As the city grew and new parishes were established in the suburbs, St. Peter lost so many members that it ceased being a formal parish in 1970, and did not regain full parish status until 1986. Since that time, in cooperation with other churches in Charlotte, particularly their sister church, St. Peter’s Episcopal, they have been working to help the poor and unfortunate of Charlotte through low-cost housing, help for AIDS victims, and outreach to the homeless. Since 1986, St. Peter's has been staffed by the Jesuits.

A prominent feature of the church interior was a triptych by American painter Ben Long, a three-part fresco depicting Christ’s Agony in the Garden, Resurrection, and Pentecost. The fresco was severely damaged in February 2002 and cannot be fully restored. Following the damage to the fresco, the interior of the Church was renovated in 2007.

== See also ==
- List of Jesuit sites
