= William G. Curlin =

American Catholic prelate

His Excellency, The Most Reverend William George Curlin
- Bishop of Charlotte
- See: Diocese of Charlotte
- Appointed: February 22, 1994
- Installed: April 13, 1994
- Term ended: September 10, 2002
- Predecessor: John Francis Donoghue
- Successor: Peter Joseph Jugis
- Previous posts: Auxiliary Bishop of Washington; 1988 to 1994

Orders
- Ordination: May 25, 1957 by Patrick O'Boyle
- Consecration: December 20, 1988 by James Aloysius Hickey, Eugene Antonio Marino, and Alvaro Corrada del Rio

Personal details
- Born: August 30, 1927 Portsmouth, Virginia, US
- Died: December 23, 2017 (aged 90) Charlotte, North Carolina, US
- Education: St. John's College; Georgetown University; St. Mary's Seminary and University
- Motto: Sentire cum Christo (To think with Christ)

Styles of William George Curlin
- Reference style: His Excellency; The Most Reverend
- Spoken style: Your Excellency
- Religious style: Bishop

William George Curlin (August 30, 1927 – December 23, 2017) was an American prelate of the Roman Catholic Church who served as bishop of the Diocese of Charlotte in North Carolina from 1994 to 2002. He previously served as an auxiliary bishop of the Archdiocese of Washington in the District of Columbia from 1988 to 1994.

== Biography ==
=== Early life ===
William Curlin was born on August 30, 1927, in Portsmouth, Virginia. Curlin was the son of Mary and Stephen Curlin. He attended St. John's College and later Georgetown University in Washington, D.C. Curlin then entered St. Mary's Seminary and University in Baltimore, Maryland.

=== Priesthood ===
Curlin was ordained a priest for the Archdiocese of Washington by Cardinal Patrick O'Boyle at the Cathedral of St. Matthew the Apostle in Washington D.C., on May 25, 1957. He served in mostly poor parishes, opened a women's shelter and 20 kitchens for the poor and homeless throughout the Washington area. Curlin and Mother Teresa championed the opening of the Gift of Peace Home, a residence in Washington for people with HIV/AIDS.

=== Auxiliary Bishop of Washington ===
Pope John Paul II appointed Curlin as an auxiliary bishop of Washington and titular bishop of Rossmarkaeum on November 2, 1988. He was consecrated by Cardinal James Hickey on December 20, 1988 at the Cathedral of Saint Matthew in Washington. Curlin served as vicar for the Theological College at the Catholic University of America from 1974 to 1980 and as chair of Associated Catholic Charities in Baltimore.

=== Bishop of Charlotte ===
John Paul II appointed Curlin as the third bishop of Charlotte on February 22, 1994; he was installed on April 13, 1994.

Curtin started the first affordable housing initiative in the diocese and concentrated on ministry to the elderly, sick and dying. As bishop, Curlin continued his ministry to the poor, ordained 28 men to the priesthood and opened numerous Churches throughout the diocese. In June 1995, Curlin invited Mother Teresa to speak at the Charlotte Coliseum, drawing a crowd of over 19,000. That same year, Curlin stated that any priest in the diocese who had been accused of sexual abuse of a minor would be immediately removed from ministry.

When Mother Teresa died in 1997, Curlin travelled to Calcutta, India, to attend her funeral as a representative of the US Conference of Catholic Bishops.

=== Retirement and legacy ===
On September 10, 2002, John Paul II accepted Curlin's resignation as bishop of Charlotte. William Curlin died in Charlotte on December 23, 2017, at age 90.

== See also ==
- Catholic Church hierarchy
- Catholic Church in the United States
- Historical list of the Catholic bishops of the United States
- List of Catholic bishops of the United States
- Lists of patriarchs, archbishops, and bishops

Catholic Church titles
Preceded by –	Bishop Emeritus of Charlotte; 2002–2017	Succeeded by –
Preceded by John Francis Donoghue	Bishop of Charlotte; 1994–2002	Succeeded by Peter Joseph Jugis
Preceded by –	Auxiliary Bishop of Washington; 1988–1994	Succeeded by –
