= Diocese of Charlotte =

Latin Catholic jurisdiction in the US

Coordinates: 35°13′14″N 80°51′15″W

Diocese of Charlotte Dioecesis Carolinana
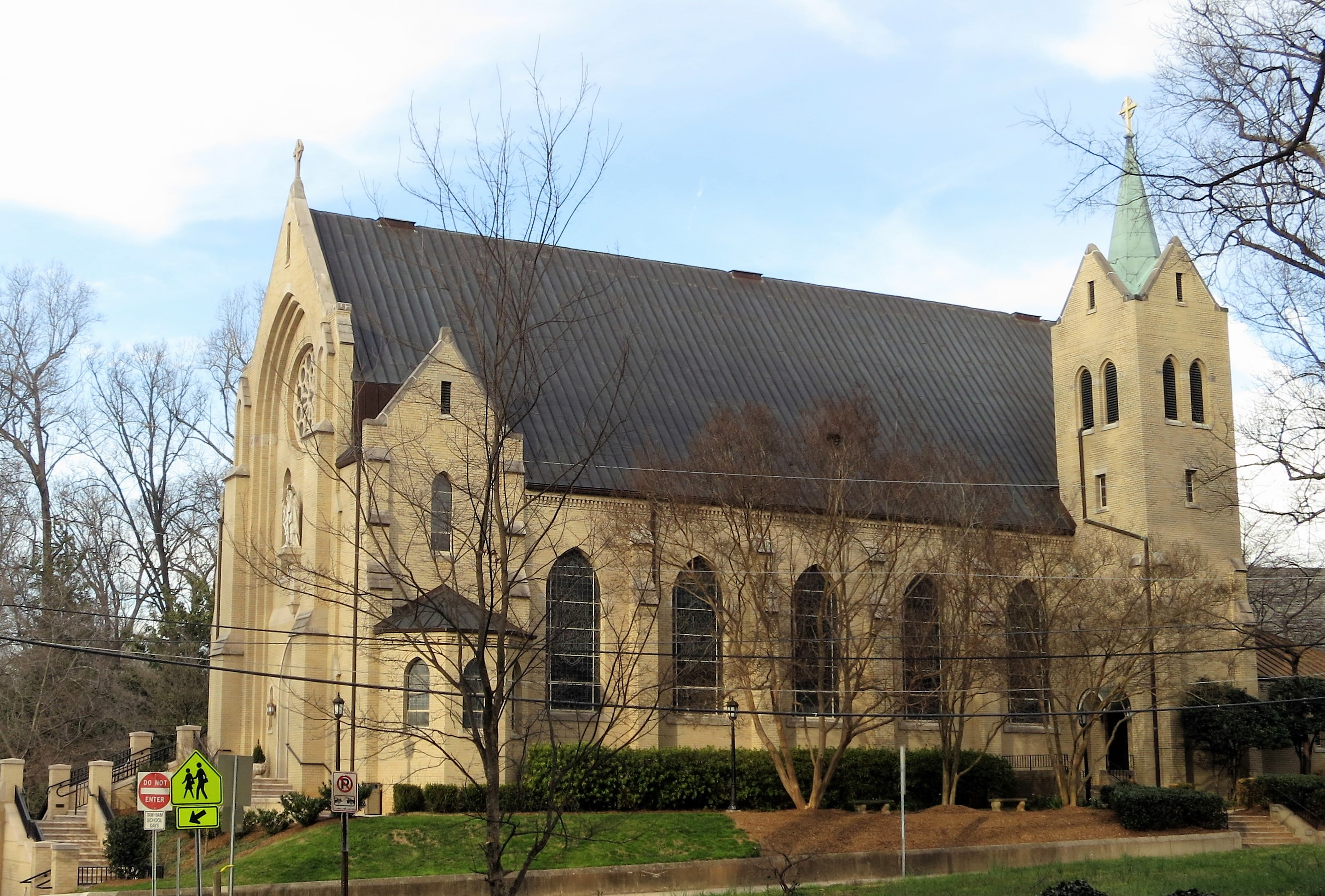
- Cathedral of St. Patrick

- Coat of arms

Location
- Country: United States
- Territory: Western North Carolina Vicariates of Albemarle, Asheville, Boone, Gastonia, Greensboro, Hickory, Mecklenburg, Salisbury, Smoky Mountain, Winston-Salem
- Ecclesiastical province: Atlanta
- Metropolitan: Archdiocese of Atlanta

Statistics
- Area: 53,696 km^{2} (20,732 sq mi)
- Population: Total; Catholics: (as of Oct 2023); 5,505,666; 546,370 (9.9%)
- Parishes: 96
- Schools: 20

Information
- Denomination: Catholic
- Sui iuris church: Latin Church
- Rite: Roman Rite
- Established: November 12, 1971
- Cathedral: Cathedral of Saint Patrick
- Patron saint: Mary, Mother of God

Current leadership
- Pope: Leo XIV
- Bishop: Michael Thomas Martin OFM Conv.
- Metropolitan Archbishop: Gregory John Hartmayer OFM Conv.
- Vicar General: Patrick Winslow
- Judicial Vicar: John Putnam
- Bishops emeritus: Peter Joseph Jugis

Map
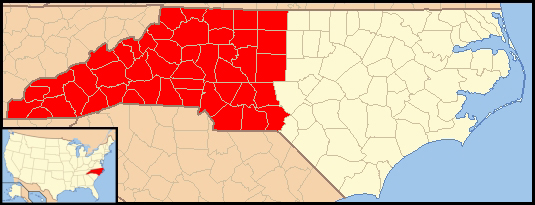

Website
- charlottediocese.org

The Diocese of Charlotte (Latin: Dioecesis Carolinana) is a diocese of the Catholic Church in western North Carolina in the United States. It is a suffragan diocese of the metropolitan Archdiocese of Atlanta. Its mother church is the Cathedral of Saint Patrick in Charlotte.

== Statistics ==
The Diocese of Charlotte covers 20,700 square miles (54,000 km^{2}) in North Carolina and includes 46 counties. It has ten vicariates. They are Albemarle, Asheville, Boone, Gastonia, Greensboro, Hickory, Mecklenburg, Salisbury, Smoky Mountain, and Winston-Salem.

The Catholic population of the diocese in 2010 was approximately 174,689 registered Catholics. This number did not include an estimated 230,000 undocumented Hispanic or Latino Catholics. St. Matthew Catholic Parish in Charlotte, with over 35,000 members, was the most populous parish in the country as of 2017. In 2024, the total Catholic population reached 530,000.

== History ==
=== 1700 to 1800 ===
During the first part of the 18th century, present-day North Carolina was a British settlement. Discrimination and persecution of Catholics in the North Carolina colony was common until it became a royal colony in 1729. Anyone wanting to hold public office in the Province of North Carolina had to sign an oath stating that Protestantism was the true Christian faith. In 1775, two Catholics in Charlotte were accused of conspiring with African-Americans. The men were tarred and feathered. During this period, the few Catholics in the regionwere under the jurisdiction of the Apostolic Vicariate of the London District in England.

With the passage of the U.S. Constitution in 1789 after the American Revolution, Catholics were guaranteed freedom of worship. Pope Pius VI erected the Prefecture Apostolic of the United States in 1784, encompassing the entire United States.

=== 1800 to 1850 ===
Five years later in 1808, Pius VI converted the prefecture into the Diocese of Baltimore. By the early 1800, Irish stone masons and other tradesmen started moving into North Carolina. The Diocese of Charleston was erected by Pope Pius VII on July 11, 1820. He removed the states of Georgia, North Carolina, and South Carolina from what was now the Archdiocese of Baltimore

Irish Catholic immigrants continued immigrating to North Carolina to work on the railroads and other construction projects. St. Peter's Church, founded in Charlotte in 1851, was the first permanent Catholic church in the region. Much of its funding came from Protestants, who were impressed by the preaching ability of its first pastor, Jeremiah J. O'Connell.

=== 1850 to 1900 ===
On March 3, 1868, Pope Pius IX erected the Vicariate Apostolic of North Carolina, removing North Carolina from the Diocese of Charleston. At that time, the pope appointed James Gibbons from the Archdiocese of Baltimore as the first vicar apostolic.

When Gibbons became vicar apostolic, North Carolina counted fewer than 700 Catholics. In his first four weeks in office, he traveled almost a thousand miles, visiting towns and mission stations and administering the sacraments. He also befriended many Protestants, who greatly outnumbered Catholics in the state, and preached at their churches. Gibbons made many converts to Catholicism. In 1872, Pius IX appointed Gibbons as bishop of the Diocese of Richmond. The Vatican would not appoint a new vicar apostolic in North Carolina for the next 11 years.

St. Benedict's Church was the first Catholic church in Greensboro, founded in 1877. It later received funding from Sister Katharine Drexel to guarantee seating for African Americans. In 1876, Saint Vincent Archabbey in Latrobe, Pennsylvania, sent a party of Benedictine monks to western North Carolina. They bought land outside of Charlotte and started building Belmont priory. Pope Leo XIII in 1884 elevated the Belmont priory to Belmont Abbey. At that time, the monks at Belmont elected Leo Haid as their first abbot.

In 1881, Leo XIII appointed Henry P. Northrop of Charleston as the new vicar apostolic of North Carolina. Two years later, the pope named Northrup to also serve as bishop of the Diocese of Charleston. Northrup held both positions until 1888, when the Vatican allowed him to resign as vicar apostolic and only serve as bishop of Charleston.In 1888, Leo XIII appointed Haid to replace Northrup as apostolic vicar of North Carolina, while allow Haid to remain as abbot of Belmont.St. Leo the Great, the first parish in Winston-Salem, was founded in the 1890s.

=== 1900 to 1950 ===
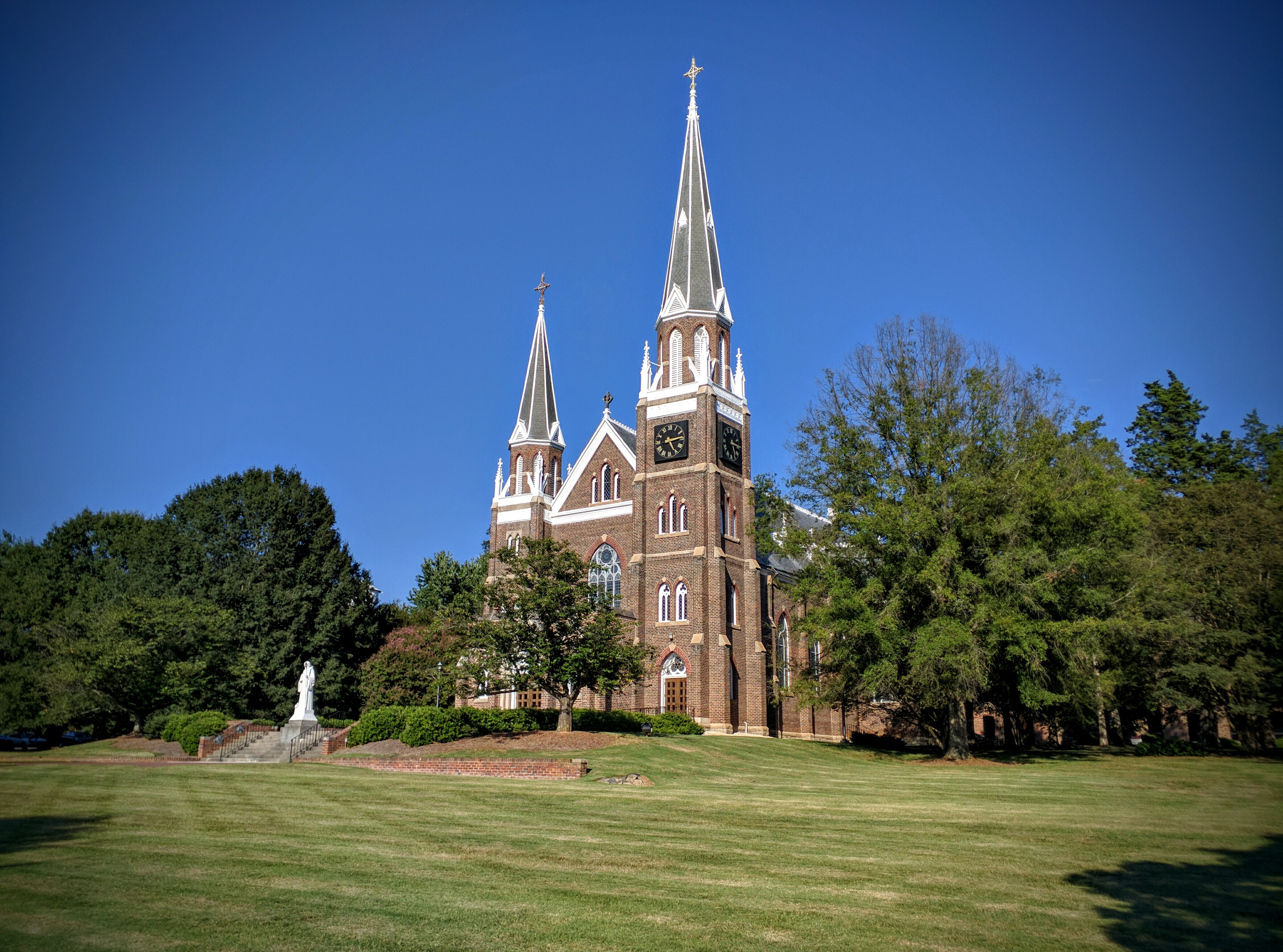
Belmont Abbey, Belmont, North Carolina (2016)

Haid in 1903 established St. Michael's, the first parish in Gastonia. St. Lawrence Parish was erected in Asheville in 1905.The Sisters of Mercy of North Carolina in 1906 opened Mercy Hospital, and Mercy School of Nursing. Today, Mercy Hospital is Atrium Health Mercy.

In 1910, Pope Pius X designated Belmont Abbey as a territorial abbey, giving it control of eight counties from the Vicariate Apostolic of North Carolina to Belmont Abbey. Haid now led two different Catholic jurisdictions in North Carolina. Haid died in 1924.

On December 12, 1924, Pope Pius XI elevated the Apostolic Vicariate of North Carolina into the Diocese of Raleigh, making it the first Catholic diocese in North Carolina. The pope appointed Monsignor William Hafey of Baltimore as its first bishop. In 1937, Pius XI named Hafey as coadjutor bishop of the Diocese of Scranton. To replace Hafey as bishop of Raleigh, the pope appointed Monsignor Eugene J. McGuinness from the Archdiocese of Philadelphia that same year. In 1944, Pope Pius XII transferred seven counties from Belmont Abbey to the Diocese of Raleigh. Later in 1944, Pius XII named McGuiness as bishop of the Diocese of Oklahoma City.

Pius XII appointed Vincent Waters from the Diocese of Richmond as the new bishop of Raleigh in 1944. Waters was accused by some of the diocesan clergy of holding on to idle church property worth millions of dollars while some parishes were in debt. He also denied requests for the creation of a priests' senate; 20% of his priests sent a request to the Vatican asking for Waters' removal.

=== 1950 to 2000 ===
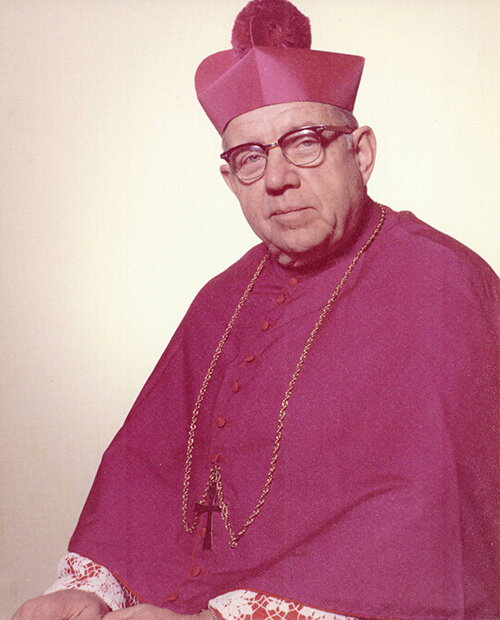
Bishop Begley

In 1953, Waters ordered the racial desegregation of all Catholic churches and schools in the diocese. He described racial segregation as a product of "darkness," and declared that "the time has come for it to end." He also said,

"I am not unmindful, as a Southerner, of the force of this virus of prejudice among some persons in the South, as well as in the North. I know, however, that there is a cure for this virus, and that is our faith."

Pope John XXIII transferred Gaston County, Belmont Abbey's last county, to the Diocese of Raleigh in 1960. Although it remained a territorial abbey, Belmont now only had jurisdiction over its own campus. In 1962, John XXIII elevated the Diocese of Atlanta to the Archdiocese of Atlanta. He designated the Diocese of Raleigh and Belmont Abbey as suffragans of the new archdiocese.

Pope Paul VI erected the Diocese of Charlotte in 1971, taking its territory from the Diocese of Raleigh.At that time, the Catholic population of the area was just over 34,000. Paul VI named Michael Begley from Raleigh as the first bishop of Charlotte. Paul VI in 1977 ended Belmont Abbey's status as a territorial abbey. Begley retired as bishop of Charlotte in 1984.

Pope John Paul II appointed John Donoghue from the Archdiocese of Washington as the second bishop of Charlotte in 1984. The Catholic population in Charlotte continued to grow, leading Donoghue to declare in the early 1990s that it would be the decade of evangelization. In 1993, John Paul II appointed Donoghue as archbishop of Atlanta.

Donoghue was succeeded as bishop of Charlotte by Auxiliary Bishop William G. Curlin from Washington in 1994. Curtin started the first affordable housing initiative in the diocese and concentrated on ministry to the elderly, sick and dying. Curlin ordained 28 men to the priesthood. In 1995, Curlin invited Mother Teresa to speak at the Charlotte Coliseum, drawing a crowd of over 19,000. That same year, Curlin stated that he would immediately remove from ministry any priest accused of sexual abuse of a minor.

=== 2000 to present ===
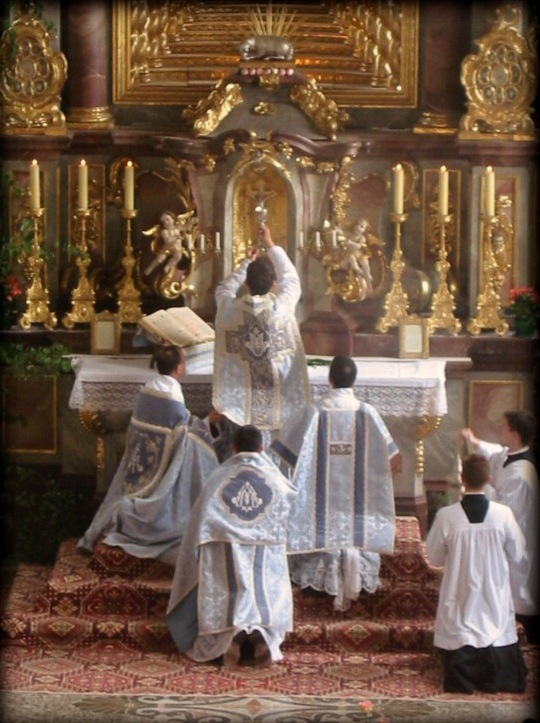
Celebration of Tridentine Mass (2012)

Curlin served until his retirement as bishop of Charlotte in 2002. By that year, the diocese had grown to approximately 87,000 Catholics. In 2003, John Paul II appointed Monsignor Peter J. Jugis, judicial vicar of the diocese, as its fourth bishop.

In July 2007, Pope Benedict XVI issued the apostolic letter Summorum Pontificum, which allowed all priests to celebrate the Tridentine Latin Mass with some restrictions. In October 2007, Samuel Weber celebrated this mass, the first held in the diocese since 1969, at Davis Chapel of Wake Forest University. Jugis noted that the diocese was trying to accommodate those with an attachment to the Tridentine mass.

Jugis in September 2020 opened St. Joseph College Seminary in Mount Holly to prepare more priests for the diocese. In 2021, citing ideological uses of the Tridentine mass, Pope Francis added new restrictions on its usage. In 2021, the diocese celebrated its fiftieth anniversary. At the end of the year, Jugis formally requested that the Vatican place the Diocese of Charlotte under the patronage of Mary, the Mother of God.

Jugis in 2023 submitted his resignation as bishop of Charlotte due to a chronic kidney condition. During his term, the Catholic population of the diocese doubled to over 530,000. In early 2024, Jugis announced plans to build a new cathedral, citing the space limitations of the Cathedral of St. Patrick. Construction was scheduled to begin in 2030. Pope Francis on April 9, 2024, appointed Michael Martin of the Franciscan Order as bishop of Charlotte.

=== Sexual abuse cases ===
In November 2019, the North Carolina Legislature passed legislation extending the statute of limitations for filing sex abuse lawsuits. While North Carolina had no statute of limitations for criminal sex abuse cases, it still had a statute of limitations for civil sex abuse lawsuits.

Also in December 2019, Bishop Jugis released a list of 14 priests credibly accused of sexual abuse in the diocese since 1972. In March 2020, the diocese added two more names to this list. This list did not include clergy accused of sexual abuse in territory controlled by the diocese prior to 1972; these men were named in a list titled "Western North Carolina." Former clergy who served in the diocese, but were accused of committing sex abuse "elsewhere", were listed separately as well.

=== Yurgel case ===
In 2009, Robert Yurgel, a former priest at St. Matthew's Parish, was arrested after pleading guilty to second-degree sexual offense of a minor. Yurgel had sexually abused a 14-year-old in 1999. In February 2009, Yurgel pleaded guilty and was sentenced to seven years in state prison. He was dismissed from the Order of Friars Minor Capuchin and laicized in 2000. The victim's civil case was settled for $1 million. Yurgel was released from prison in August 2016.

=== Spangenberg case ===
On August 14, 2018, a grand jury report released by the Pennsylvania attorney general named 301 priests responsible for allegedly abusing over 1,000 children within six Pennsylvania dioceses over 70 years. One of them was Robert Spangenberg, a Spiritan priest who served in the Dioceses of Charlotte and Raleigh. Spangenberg had been a pastor at St. James Parish in Hamlet, North Carolina, in the 1990s. The Diocese of Charlotte said that it had never received any concerns from Congregation of the Holy Spirit about Spangenberg's behavior in Pennsylvania, and that there had been no complaints about him in North Carolina.

=== West case ===
On March 25, 2019, the diocese announced that Mauricio West, its vicar general and chancellor, had resigned from his posts. The diocese had received allegations against West of unwanted sexual advances towards an adult student at Belmont Abbey College in Belmont in the 1980s. Taking a leave of absence, West denied all the accusations. The Lay Review Board of the diocese found these allegations to be credible. In November 2019, four more complaints of sexual misconduct were lodged against West. Two of the accusations came from diocese employees, the other two from Belmont students.

=== Kelleher and Farwell cases ===
On April 14, 2020, two sex abuse lawsuits were filed against the diocese. The plaintiffs alleged that the diocese shielded Richard Farwell. The lawsuits were filed previously, but both were dismissed due to the previous statute of limitations. The plaintiffs were able to sue again because of the 2019 changes to North Carolina state law. The Farwell lawsuit was filed by a North Carolina man who was a teenager in 1977. He alleged that Farwell started abusing him after he went to the priest for counseling. The plaintiff file a lawsuit against Farwell in 2011, but it was dismissed due to the statute of limitations. Farwell was later accused by a second man. Farwell was later convicted of contributing to the delinquency of a minor, sentenced to probation, and removed from ministry in 2005.

=== Baker case ===
In November 2021, the diocese was sued by man who claimed he had been sexually assaulted by Donald Baker, a diocesan priest, in the 1980s. The plaintiff had made his accusation to the diocese in 2017, saying that Baker abused him starting when he was seven years old between 1985 and 1989. Baker resigned from ministry in 1994; he was added to the list of diocese priests with credible accusations of sexual abuse of minors in 2016.

== Bishops of Charlotte ==
1. Michael Joseph Begley (1971–1984)
2. John Francis Donoghue (1984–1993), appointed Archbishop of Atlanta
3. William G. Curlin (1994–2002)
4. Peter Joseph Jugis (2003–2024)
5. Michael Thomas Martin (2024–present)

== Catholic News Herald ==
Catholic News Herald
- Catholic News Herald cover (July 31, 2020)
- Type: Biweekly
- Format: Print and online
- Owner: Roman Catholic Diocese of Charlotte
- Founded: 1991
- Headquarters: 1123 South Church St., Charlotte, N.C. 28203-4003 U.S.A.
- Website: www.catholicnewsherald.com

The Catholic News Herald is the official publication of the Diocese of Charlotte. It reports news from the diocese, along with general Catholic and world news with a Catholic perspective. Established in 1991, the Herald publishes 26 issues per year. It also distributes a Spanish supplement within the publication.

== Education ==
As of 2026, the Diocese of Charlotte has 20 schools with over 8,000 students.

=== High schools ===
- Bishop McGuinness Catholic High School – Kernersville
- Charlotte Catholic High School – Charlotte
- Canongate Catholic – Arden
- Christ the King Catholic High School – Huntersville

=== Seminary ===
St. Joseph College Seminary – Mount Holly

=== College ===
Belmont Abbey College – Belmont
