= John Francis Donoghue =

American prelate

His Excellency, The Most Reverend John Francis Donoghue
- Archbishop of Atlanta
- See: Archdiocese of Atlanta
- Installed: August 19, 1993
- Term ended: December 9, 2004
- Predecessor: James Patterson Lyke
- Successor: Wilton Daniel Gregory
- Other post: Bishop of Charlotte (1984–1993)

Orders
- Ordination: June 4, 1955 by Patrick O'Boyle
- Consecration: December 18, 1984 by Michael Joseph Begley

Personal details
- Born: August 9, 1928 Washington, D.C., USA
- Died: November 11, 2011 (aged 83) Atlanta, Georgia, USA
- Buried: Arlington Memorial Park in Sandy Springs, Georgia, USA
- Education: St. Mary's Seminary and University; Catholic University of America
- Motto: To live in Christ Jesus

Styles of John Francis Donoghue
- Reference style: The Most Reverend
- Spoken style: Your Excellency
- Religious style: Archbishop

John Francis Donoghue (August 9, 1928 – November 11, 2011) was an American prelate of the Roman Catholic Church. He served as the second bishop of the Diocese of Charlotte in North Carolina from 1984 to 1993 and as the fifth archbishop of the Archdiocese of Atlanta in Georgia from 1993 to 2004.

== Biography ==
=== Early life and education ===
John Donoghue was born on August 9, 1928, in Washington, D.C., the second of four brothers born to Irish immigrant parents, Daniel and Rose (née Ryan) Donoghue. He received a Bachelor of Arts degree in philosophy and a Master of Sacred Theology degree from St. Mary's Seminary and University in Baltimore, Maryland.

=== Priesthood ===
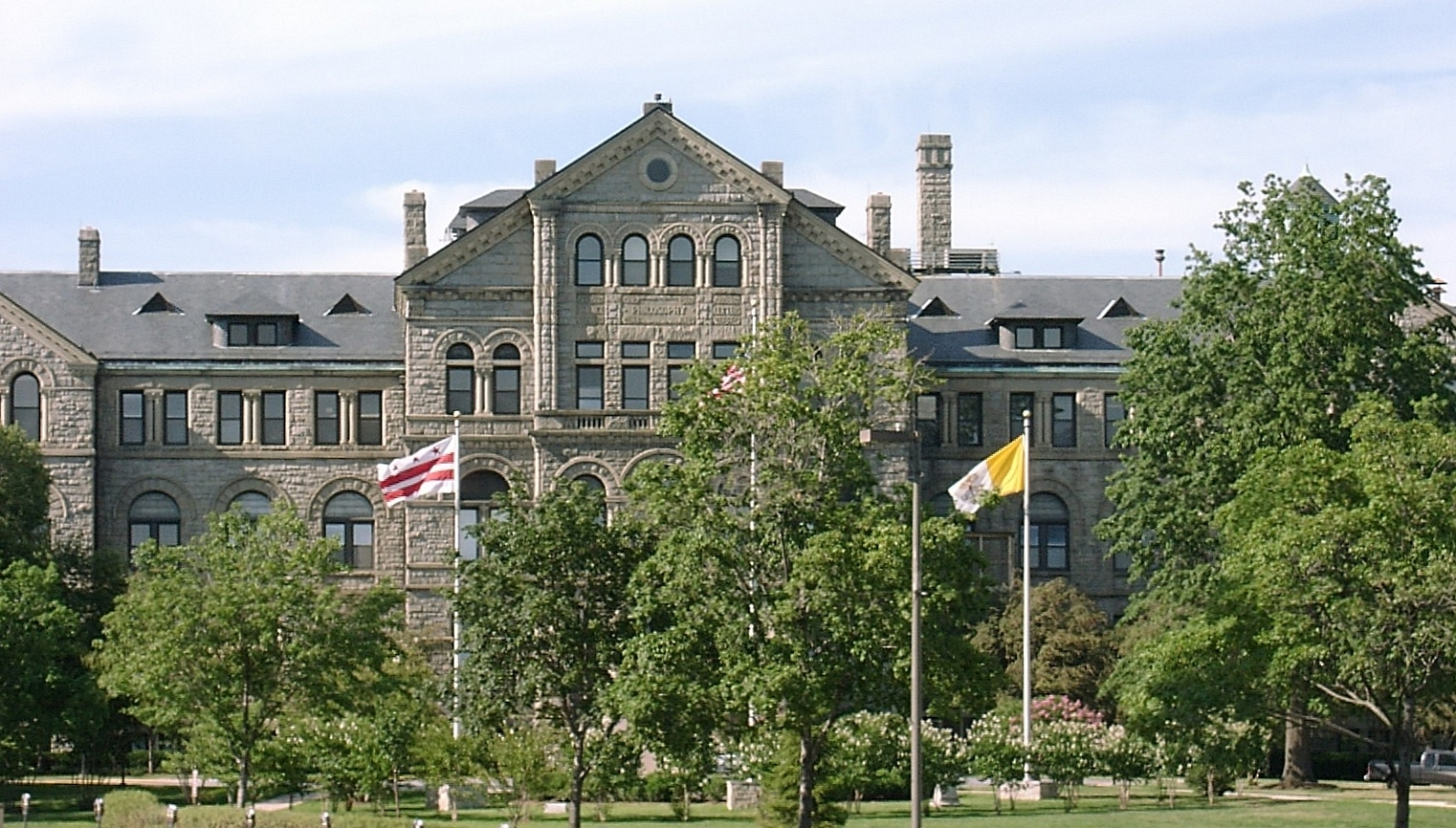
Catholic University of America, Washington, D.C. (2000)

Donoghue was ordained to the priesthood for the Archdiocese of Washington by Archbishop Patrick O'Boyle on June 4, 1955. After his ordination, Donoghue was assigned as assistant pastor at St. Bernard of Clairvaux Parish in Riverdale Park, Maryland, from 1955 to 1961. He was transferred in 1961 to Holy Face Parish in Great Mills, Maryland, staying there until 1964.

While originally planning to remain a parish priest, Donoghue was asked in 1964 to study for a Licentiate of Canon Law at Catholic University of America in Washington, D.C. On completion of his degree, he was assigned to the archbishop's office. For the next 18 years, Donoghue served on the staff for three cardinals: Patrick O'Boyle, William Baum, and James Hickey. From 1972 until 1983, Donoghue also filled the offices of chancellor and vicar general for that archdiocese. In 1984, Donoghue was appointed moderator of the curia.

=== Bishop of Charlotte ===
On November 6, 1984, Pope John Paul II appointed Donoghue as the second bishop of Charlotte. He was consecrated at Owens Auditorium in Charlotte, North Carolina, on December 18, 1984, by Bishop Michael Begley.

=== Archbishop of Atlanta ===
On June 22, 1993, John Paul II appointed Donoghue as the sixth archbishop of Atlanta, replacing Archbishop James P. Lyke. Donoghue was installed on August 19, 1993.On becoming archbishop, Donoghue began a program of school building to accommodate the growing population of the archdiocese. He also worked to provide more Spanish-speaking priests for the increased Hispanic population.

In April 2004, Donoghue sent an edict to the priests in the archdiocese forbidding the selection of women to perform the traditional foot washing ceremony on Holy Thursday.

=== Retirement ===
John Paul II accepted Donoghue's resignation as archbishop of Atlanta on December 9, 2004; he was succeeded by Bishop Wilton D. Gregory.

John Donoghue died of respiratory failure in Atlanta on November 11, 2011, at age 83. His body lay in state at the Basilica of the Sacred Heart of Jesus in Atlanta until his funeral mass on November 17, 2011, at the Cathedral of Christ the King in Atlanta.

== Viewpoints ==
=== Abortion ===
Donoghue said in 2004 that Catholic politicians who support abortion rights for women should be denied the eucharist.

=== Sexual abuse scandal ===
Donoghue made this statement in 1993 about the sexual abuse of minors by priest scandal in the late 20th century:

"Never before in our experience has the credibility of the priesthood itself been so shaken by the actions of some of our priests. Because we live under the shadow of their indiscretions, we are forced to take the witness stand of life and demonstrate by our lives and our actions that we indeed are men of integrity, men of God.”

== See also ==
- Catholic Church hierarchy
- Catholic Church in the United States
- Historical list of the Catholic bishops of the United States
- List of Catholic bishops of the United States
- Lists of patriarchs, archbishops, and bishops

Catholic Church titles
Preceded by James Patterson Lyke	Archbishop of Atlanta; 1993–2004	Succeeded by Wilton Daniel Gregory
Preceded by Michael Joseph Begley	Bishop of Charlotte; 1984–1993	Succeeded by William George Curlin
