= Michael Joseph Begley =

American prelate

His Excellency, The Most Reverend Michael Joseph Begley
- Bishop of Charlotte
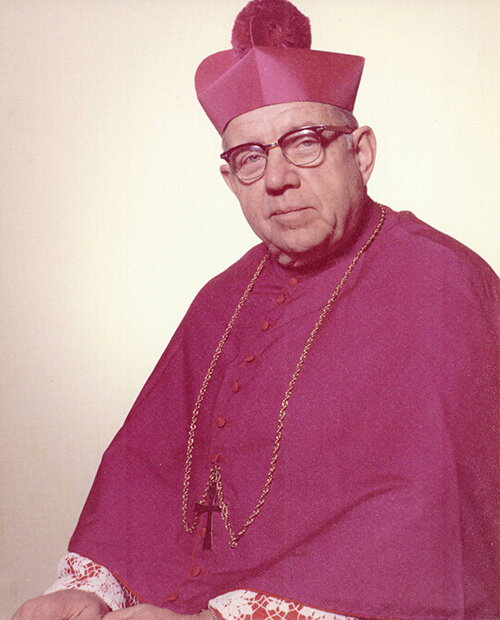
- See: Diocese of Charlotte
- In office: January 12, 1972; May 29, 1984
- Successor: John Francis Donoghue

Orders
- Ordination: May 26, 1934 by Thomas Michael O'Leary
- Consecration: January 12, 1972 by Luigi Raimondi

Personal details
- Born: February 12, 1909 West Springfield, Massachusetts, US
- Died: February 9, 2002 (aged 92) High Point, North Carolina, US
- Denomination: Roman Catholic
- Education: Mount St. Mary's College; University of North Carolina
- Motto: Diligimus Fratres ("We have loved the brethren")

Michael Joseph Begley (March 12, 1909 – February 9, 2002) was an American prelate of the Roman Catholic Church. He was the first bishop of the Diocese of Charlotte in North Carolina, serving from 1972 until 1984.

== Biography ==
=== Early life ===
Michael Begley was born on February 12, 1909, in West Springfield, Massachusetts, to Dennis and Anna (née Moynahan) Begley. Dennis Begley came to the United States from County Kerry in Ireland.

Michael Begley received his early education at West Springfield public schools and at Cathedral High School in Springfield. He studied at Mount St. Mary's College in Emmitsburg, Maryland, obtaining a Bachelor of Arts degree in 1930.

=== Priesthood ===
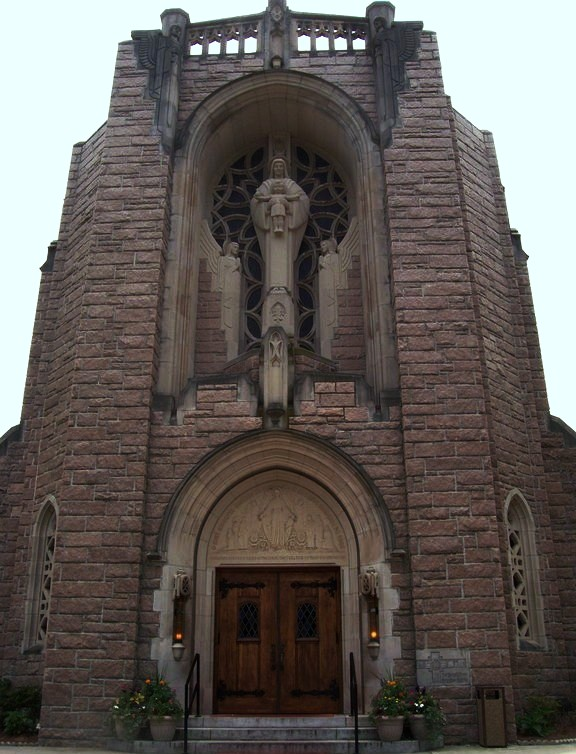
Our Lady of Grace Catholic Church, Greensboro, North Carolina (2005)

Begley was ordained to the priesthood in Springfield by Bishop Thomas O'Leary on May 26, 1934, for the Diocese of Raleigh. After his ordination, Begley served in pastoral assignments at Basilica Shrine of St. Mary Parish in Wilmington, North Carolina and at St. Edward Parish in High Point, North Carolina.

Begley then served as pastor of St. Therese Parish in Wrightsville Beach, North Carolina, Immaculate Conception Parish in Wilmington (1938–1942), and at St. Leo the Great Parish in Winston-Salem, North Carolina. (1942–1955). He earned a Master of Social Work degree from the University of North Carolina in 1949, and was named a domestic prelate by the Vatican in 1954.

In 1955, Begley became the first pastor of St. Ann Parish in Charlotte, North Carolina. He was later made superintendent of Raleigh's Catholic orphanage and pastor of Our Lady of Grace Catholic Church Parish in Greensboro, North Carolina.

=== Bishop of Charlotte ===
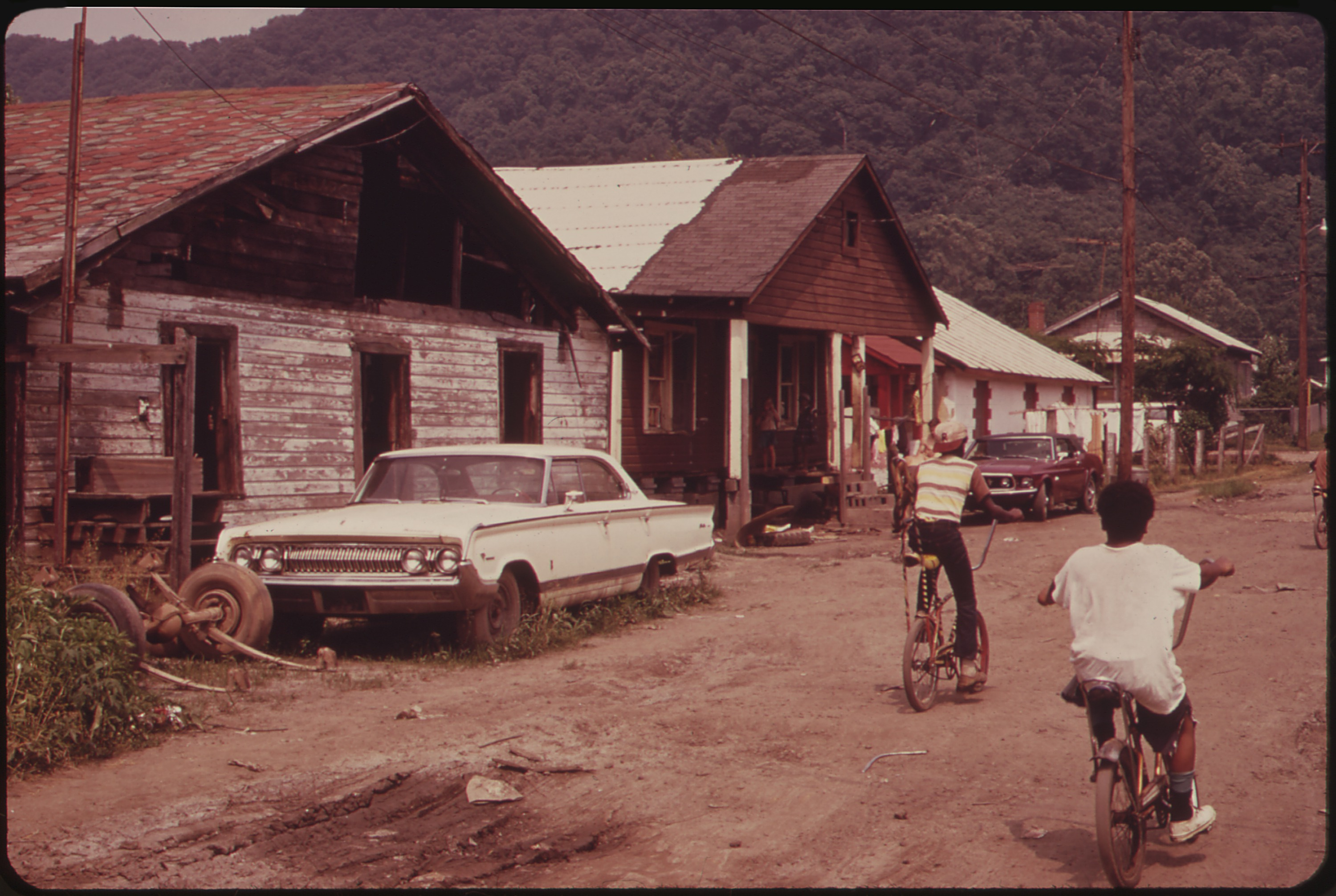
Rand, West Virginia (1973)

On November 30, 1971, Begley was appointed as the first bishop of the newly-erected Diocese of Charlotte by Pope Paul VI. He received his episcopal consecration on January 12, 1972, from Archbishop Luigi Raimondi, with Bishops Vincent Waters and George Lynch serving as co-consecrators. He selected as his motto: "Diligimus Fratres" ("We Have Loved the Brethren").

In addition to his duties as a diocesan bishop, Begley also served as chair of the Catholic Committee on Appalachia. In this capacity, he led 26 other bishops from 13 states in issuing a joint pastoral letter "This Land is Home to Me" on the state of the poor in the region.

=== Retirement ===
Upon reaching the mandatory retirement age of 75, Begley submitted his letter of resignation to Pope John Paul II in March 1984. The pope accepted his resignation on May 29, 1984, and he was succeeded by Monsignor John Donoghue.

Michael Begley died on February 9, 2002, at the Maryfield Nursing Home in High Point, North Carolina, at age 92. He was a cousin of Bishop William Joseph Hafey, and baptized Bishop Peter Jugis as a child.

== Viewpoints ==
=== Capital punishment ===
A supporter of capital punishment, Begley endorsed the 1984 execution of serial killer Velma Barfield in North Carolina, noting, "The state has a right to decide on the death penalty and this is one instance when they chose that right."

== See also ==
- Catholic Church hierarchy
- Catholic Church in the United States
- Historical list of the Catholic bishops of the United States
- List of Catholic bishops of the United States
- Lists of patriarchs, archbishops, and bishops

== Episcopal succession ==
Catholic Church titles
Preceded by none	Bishop of Charlotte; 1971–1984	Succeeded by John Francis Donoghue
