= Judicial vicar =

Position within the Roman Catholic Church

In the Roman Catholic Church, a judicial vicar or episcopal official (Latin: officialis) is an officer of the diocese who has ordinary power to judge cases in the diocesan ecclesiastical court. Although the diocesan bishop can reserve certain cases to himself, the judicial vicar and the diocesan bishop are a single tribunal, which means that decisions of the judicial vicar cannot be appealed to the diocesan bishop but must instead be appealed to the appellate tribunal. The judicial vicar (or officialis) ought to be someone other than the vicar general, unless the smallness of the diocese or the limited number of cases suggest otherwise. Other judges, who may be priests, deacons, religious brothers or sisters or nuns, or laypersons, and who must have knowledge of canon law and be Catholics in good standing, assist the judicial vicar either by deciding cases on a single judge basis or by forming with him a panel over which he or one of them presides. A judicial vicar may also be assisted by adjutant judicial vicars (or vice-officiales). The judicial vicar is assisted by at least one, if not more, individuals with the title defender of the bond; they are normally priests, but do not have to be. On staff will also be notaries and secretaries, who may be priests, religious brothers or sisters or nuns, or laypersons.

Judicial vicars, adjutants, and other judges who preside in cases must be priests of good repute, must be at least thirty years old, and must hold a doctorate or Licentiate of Canon Law.

Judicial vicars are to serve for a specific term of office and, unlike vicars general and episcopal vicars, do not cease from office when the diocese is without a bishop, either through the bishop's death, resignation (having been accepted by the Roman Pontiff), transfer, or privation of office (having been made known to the bishop).
