= Michael T. Martin =

American Catholic prelate (born 1961)

His Excellency, The Most Reverend Michael T. Martin OFM Conv.
- Bishop of Charlotte
- Church: Catholic
- Diocese: Charlotte
- Appointed: April 9, 2024
- Installed: May 29, 2024
- Predecessor: Peter Joseph Jugis

Orders
- Ordination: June 10, 1989 by John Huston Ricard
- Consecration: May 29, 2024 by Gregory John Hartmayer, Christophe Pierre, and Peter Joseph Jugis

Personal details
- Born: December 2, 1961 (age 64) Baltimore, Maryland, US
- Education: Saint Hyacinth Seminary; Pontifical University of St. Bonaventure; Boston College
- Motto: Duc in altum (Latin for 'Put out into the deep')
- Styles
- Reference style: His Excellency; The Most Reverend
- Spoken style: Your Excellency
- Religious style: Bishop

Michael Thomas Martin (born December 2, 1961) is an American Catholic prelate who serves as Bishop of Charlotte and is a member of the Order of Friars Minor Conventual.

== Biography ==
=== Early life ===
Martin was born on December 2, 1961, in Baltimore, Maryland, to Beverly Beatty and Donald Martin. He attended Archbishop Curley High School in that city. After high school, Martin entered the Franciscan novitiate at Ellicott City, Maryland in August 1979 and professed his solemn vows to the order on August 2, 1985. In the meantime he earned a bachelor's degree in philosophy from Saint Hyacinth Seminary in Granby, Massachusetts, a Baccalaureate in Sacred Theology from the Pontifical University of St. Bonaventure in Rome, and a Master of Education degree from Boston College.

=== Priesthood ===
Martin was ordained to the priesthood for the Franciscan Order on June 10, 1989, by Bishop John Huston Ricard at St. Casimir Church in Baltimore. After his ordination, the Franciscans assigned Martin as a teacher and coach at Saint Francis High School in Athol Springs, New York.

In 1994, he was transferred back to Baltimore to teach and coach at Archbishop Curley High School. He was ultimately named as principal and then president at the school. Martin led a successful $7 million capital campaign at Archbishop Curley and increased its enrollment after a decline during the 1990s. Because of his work at Bishop Curley, the Vatican awarded Martin its Pro Ecclesia et Pontifice award in 2007.

In 2010, the Franciscans sent Martin to North Carolina to serve as director of the Duke University Catholic Center. After twelve years at Duke, Martin received his first pastoral appointment as pastor of St. Philip Benizi Church in Jonesboro, Georgia.

=== Bishop of Charlotte ===
On April 9, 2024, Pope Francis accepted the resignation of Bishop Peter Jugis of Charlotte due to health reasons and appointed Martin as his successor. With Martin's appointment, the Conventual Franciscans became the most represented religious community among the active bishops of the United States.

Martin's episcopal consecration occurred on May 29, 2024, at St. Mark Catholic Church in Huntersville, North Carolina. He was consecrated by Archbishop Gregory Hartmayer, with Jugis and Cardinal Christophe Pierre serving as co-consecrators.

The Pillar reported that on April 1, 2025, Cardinal Robert Prevost, the future Pope Leo XIV and at the time the prefect of the Dicastery for Bishops, met with Martin to discuss the speed of changes within the diocese. The meeting reportedly was not disciplinary, but "fraternal", encouraging Martin to take time before making major decisions in the diocese. The incident reportedly spurring the meeting was a proposal, met with mixed reviews in the diocese, to move the diocesan cathedral outside of Charlotte.

In May of 2025, Martin restricted celebration of the Tridentine Mass from four parish churches to just one chapel in the diocese, in accordance with Francis' motu proprio Traditionis custodes. At the same time, leaked documents showed drafts of plans to restrict kneeling to receive the Eucharist, the use of Latin in the liturgy, vesting prayers, the use of Missal stands and Roman-style liturgical vestments. In September of the same year, Martin prohibited the use of the altar rail at Charlotte Catholic High School.

In December 2025, Martin issued a pastoral letter on instructions for receiving the Eucharist within the diocese. In it, he announced that beginning January 16, 2026, altar rails would be prohibited:

"The episcopal conference norms logically do not envision the use of altar rails, kneelers, or prie-dieus for the reception of communion. Doing so is a visible contradiction to the normative posture of Holy Communion established by our episcopal conferences. Instead, the instruction emphasizes that receiving Holy Communion is to be done as the members of the faithful go in procession, witnessing that the Church journeys forward and receives Holy Communion as a pilgrim people on their way."

In reaction to this abolishment of altar rails and kneelers, 31 diocesan priests, roughly 40% of incardinated diocesan priests of the Diocese of Charlotte at the time, sent a dubia to the Dicastery for Legislative Texts if it is licit "whether a diocesan bishop may prohibit the use of kneelers to assist members of the faithful who, of their own accord, wish to receive holy Communion kneeling."

He also instructed clergy, catechists, extraordinary ministers of Holy Communion, and teachers "not to teach that some other manner is better, preferred, more efficacious, etc." Martin also announced in his letter provisions for receiving communion under both kinds and the use of extraordinary ministers of Holy Communion.

In January 2026, Martin reinstated Patrick Hoare, a priest who had previously been removed due to credible allegations of misconduct.

== See also ==
- Catholic Church hierarchy
- Catholic Church in the United States
- Historical list of the Catholic bishops of the United States
- List of Catholic bishops of the United States
- Lists of patriarchs, archbishops, and bishops

== Episcopal succession ==
Catholic Church titles
Preceded by Peter Joseph Jugis	Bishop of Charlotte; 2024–present	Succeeded by Incumbent
