= Sophia Academy =

Location
- (second) 2880 Dresden Drive, Atlanta, Georgia 30341 (first) 650 Mt. Vernon Road, Atlanta, GA 30328
- Coordinates: 33°52′36″N 84°16′38″W

Information
- School type: Privately funded, Private, Coeducational
- Religious affiliation: Roman Catholic
- Established: 1999
- Founder: Marie Corrigan
- Head of school: Jenni Ellis
- Grades: PreK3-12
- Campus: Suburban
- Colors: Blue and gold
- Accreditation: Southern Association of Colleges and Schools; National Catholic Educational Association
- Affiliation: Private
- Admissions Director: Jennifer Artique
- Athletic Director: John Turner
- Website: sophiaacademy.org

Sophia Academy was a private, Roman Catholic PreK3-12 school in the Atlanta metropolitan area in Georgia. It was located in the Roman Catholic Archdiocese of Atlanta and was located in Sandy Springs and then DeKalb County (later annexed by Chamblee).

== History ==
Sophia Academy was founded in 1999 by Maria Corrigan. At the time, it had 11 students. Its initial campus was on a rental property in Sandy Springs, Fulton County.

The school achieved accreditation in 2006 from the Southern Association of Colleges and Schools.

In the 2005–2006 school year the administration sought to establish a new campus in DeKalb County and did a capital campaign. Construction began circa 2007. The new campus was annexed into Chamblee.

It became recognized as a Catholic school in 2013. Jenni Ellis became the principal in 2016, as Corrigan had retired.

It merged into Notre Dame Academy in Duluth, Georgia effective August 2017. The previous Sophia Academy campus closed, with operations moved to Notre Dame.

== See also ==
- List of private schools in Atlanta
- National Catholic Educational Association
