= Howard School =

Howard School may refer to numerous institutions:

== United States ==
- Howard School (Brownsburg, Indiana), listed on the NRHP in Boone County, Indiana
- Howard School (Warrensburg, Missouri), NRHP-listed
- Howard School (Forsyth, Montana), NRHP-listed
- Howard School (Atlanta), Georgia
- Howard Junior High School, Prosperity, South Carolina, listed on the NRHP in Newberry County, South Carolina
- Howard School of Academics and Technology, Chattanooga, Tennessee
- former school in Alexandria, Virginia, precursor to the Episcopal High School
- Old Howard Academy (1936–1960) in Monticello, Florida

== United Kingdom ==
- The Howard School, Kent

== See also ==
- Howard High School (disambiguation)
- Howard University, a federally chartered, private, coeducational, nonsectarian, historically black university in Washington, D.C., USA
