= Joel Matthias Konzen =

His Excellency, The Most Reverend Joel Matthias Konzen S.M.
- Auxiliary Bishop of Atlanta
- Archdiocese: Atlanta
- Appointed: February 5, 2018
- Installed: April 3, 2018

Orders
- Ordination: May 19, 1979 by Stanley Joseph Ott
- Consecration: April 3, 2018 by Wilton Daniel Gregory, Bernard Shlesinger, and Thomas John Rodi

Personal details
- Born: November 6, 1950 (age 75) Oak Harbor, Ohio, US
- Education: St. Meinrad Seminary; Notre Dame Seminary; Catholic University of America
- Motto: Miserere Gaudens (Be merciful, and with a cheerful heart)

Styles of Joel Matthias Konzen
- Reference style: His Excellency; The Most Reverend
- Spoken style: Your Excellency
- Religious style: Bishop

Joel Matthias Konzen S.M. (born November 6, 1950) is an American Catholic prelate who has served as an auxiliary bishop for the Archdiocese of Atlanta in Georgia since 2018.

== Biography ==
=== Early life ===
Joel Konzen was born on November 6, 1950, in Toledo, Ohio, and grew up in Oak Harbor, Ohio. He entered St. Meinrad Seminary in St. Meinrad, Indiana in 1968, where he received a Bachelor of Arts degree in English in 1972. Kozen then went to Notre Dame Seminary in New Orleans, where he earned a Master of Divinity degree in 1974.

While at Notre Dame, Konzen entered the novitiate for the Society of Mary (the Marists). He took his first vows as a Marist in 1975. The Marists in 1976 assigned Konzen as a teacher at St. Peter Chanel High School in Bedford, Ohio for one year. He then attended the Catholic University of America in Washington, D.C., receiving a Master of Theology degree in systematic theology in 1978. That same year, Konzen returned to New Orleans to take perpetual vows as a Marist and was ordained a deacon. As a deacon, the Marists then assigned him to serve at St. Andrew the Apostle Parish in New Orleans.

=== Priesthood ===
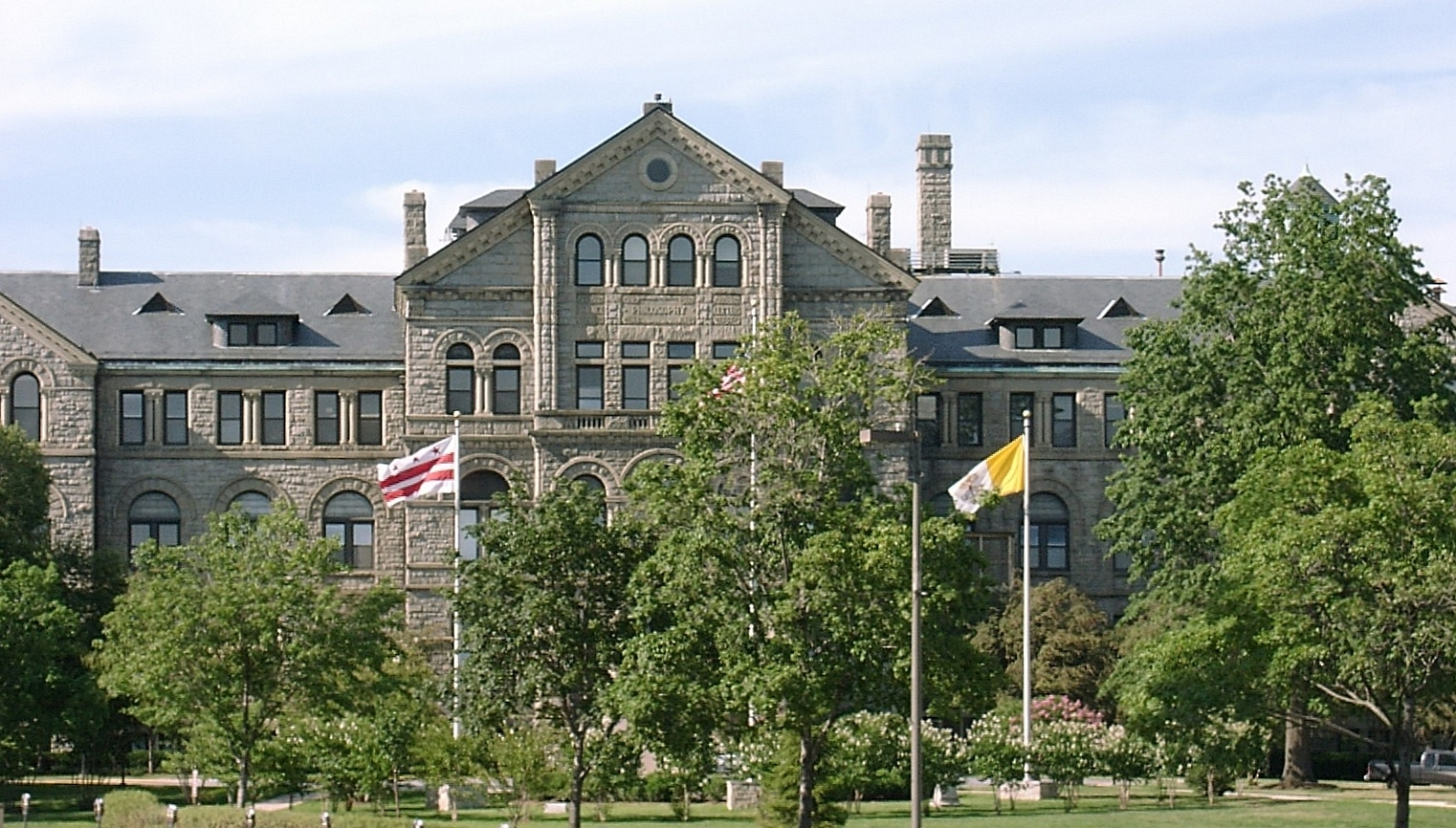
Catholic University of America, Washington, D.C. (2000)

On May 19, 1979, Konzen was ordained to the priesthood for the Marists by Bishop Stanley Ott at St. Andrew the Apostle Church in New Orleans. After his ordination, the Marists assigned him to a pastoral role in 1979 at St. Edmond Parish in Lafayette, Louisiana.

The Marists sent Konzen in 1980 to Brookhaven, Georgia, to teach at the Marist School. Over the next nine years, he also served as admissions director, principal and president there. In 1990, the Marists appointed Konzen as vicar provincial of the former Washington Province of the Society of Mary in Washington D.C. He went back to Catholic University during this period, receiving a Master of Educational Administration degree in 1991.

Konzen was appointed in 1992 as principal and president at St. Michael's Catholic Academy in Austin, Texas, administering there for the next five years. The Marists in 1997 reassigned him as vicar provincial in Washington for two years. Konzen returned to the Marist School in Brookhaven in 1999 to serve as principal and then as president until 2018. He assisted in the founding of Notre Dame Academy and Cristo Rey Atlanta Jesuit High School in Atlanta. In 2015, Konzen received the Educational Excellence Award of the National Catholic Educational Association (NCEA).

=== Auxiliary Bishop of Atlanta ===
Pope Francis appointed Konzen as an auxiliary bishop of Atlanta on February 5, 2018. On April 3, 2018, Konzen was consecrated by Archbishop Wilton Gregory at the Cathedral of Christ the King in Atlanta, with Archbishop Thomas Rodi and Bishop Bernard Shlesinger III serving as co-consecrators.

On May 24, 2019, after the installation of Gregory as archbishop of the Archdiocese of Washington, the college of consultors in Atlanta elected Konzen as the administrator of the archdiocese. Konzen's administrator responsibilities ended on May 6, 2020, with the installation of Bishop Gregory Hartmayer as the new archbishop of Atlanta.

The Bishop Joel Konzen School was founded in 2021 at the Pope Francis School and Health Center in Avenui, Ghana.

=== Boards ===
- Notre Dame Seminary in New Orleans
- Pope Francis School and Health Center in Ghana
- Marist School in Brookhaven

== Coat of arms ==
For Konzen the shield is silver (white) with a blue pile (an A-shaped device) upon which is displayed the conjoined "A" and "M," known an "the monogram of Mary," in silver (white) that is the emblem of the Society of Mary. The pile resembles an inlet of water, such as a bay or harbor, and this pile is charged with a gold (yellow) oak leaf to signify Oak Harbor, Ohio, Konzen's home town. Above the pile are an open book (gold [yellow] with red edges) and a red cross to signify that Konzen has spent most of his life in education, in a Catholic environment, including his last position, before becoming a bishop, as president of the Marist School.

== See also ==
- Catholic Church hierarchy
- Catholic Church in the United States
- Historical list of the Catholic bishops of the United States
- List of Catholic bishops of the United States
- Lists of patriarchs, archbishops, and bishops

== Episcopal succession ==
Catholic Church titles
Preceded by –	Auxiliary Bishop of Atlanta; 2018–Present	Succeeded by –
