= Blessed Trinity Catholic High School =

Archdiocesan Catholic high school in Roswell, Georgia, United States

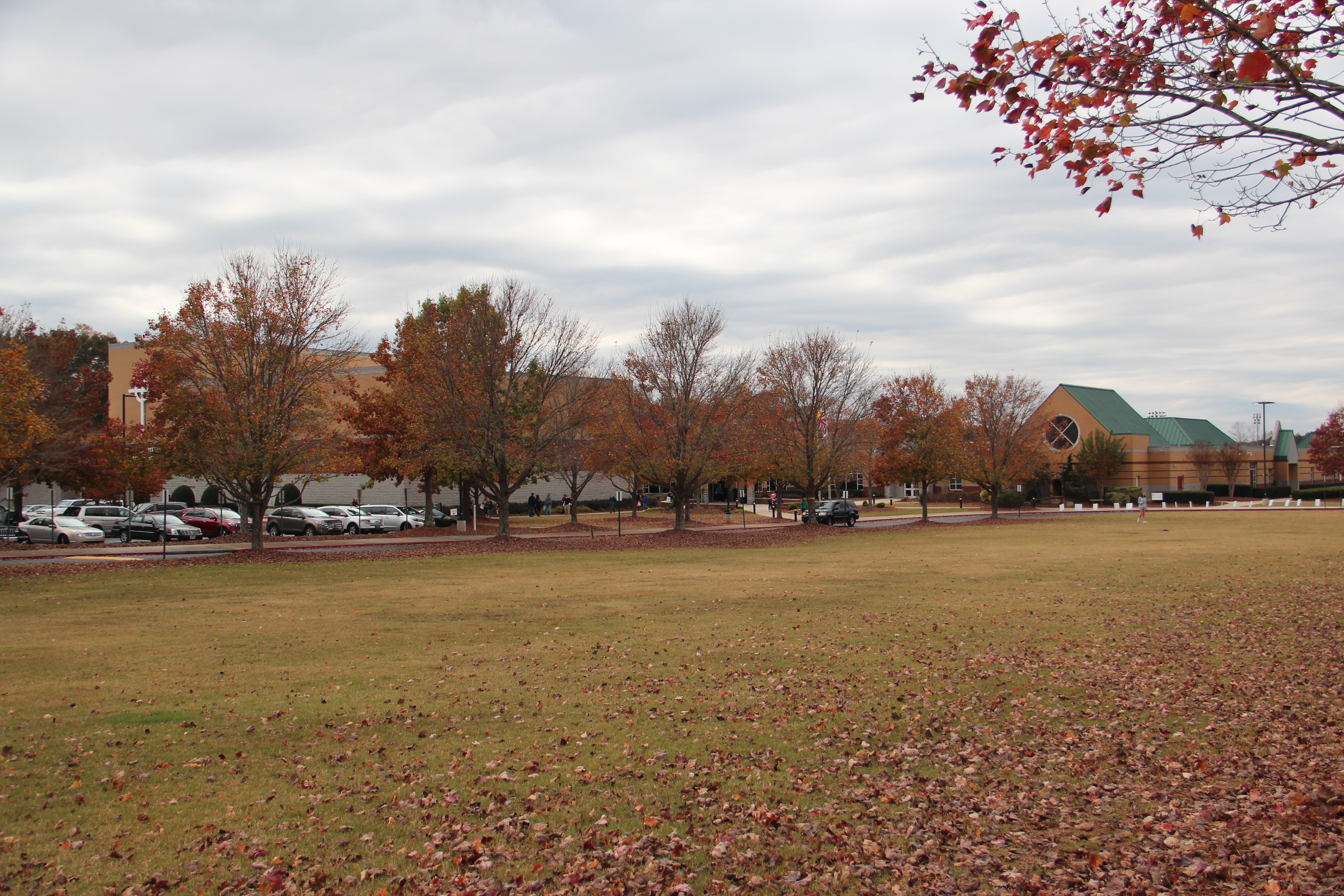
- Blessed Trinity in 2017

Location
- 11320 Woodstock Road; Roswell, Georgia 30075; United States
- 34°3′21″N 84°23′13″W

Information
- Type: Private secondary school
- Religious affiliation: Roman Catholic
- Opened: 2000
- Oversight: Archdiocese of Atlanta
- Principal: Cathy Lancaster
- Teaching staff: 89.3 (FTE) (2019–20)
- Grades: 9–12
- Enrollment: 970 (2019–20)
- Student to teacher ratio: 10.9 (2019–20)
- Colors: Hunter green and gold
- Nickname: Titans
- Accreditation: Southern Association of Colleges and Schools
- Newspaper: The Titan Times
- Affiliation: National Catholic Educational Association
- Website: btcatholic.org

Blessed Trinity Catholic High School, also known as Blessed Trinity or, informally BT, is an Archdiocesan Catholic high school in Roswell, Georgia, United States, a northern suburb of Atlanta.

The multi-level curriculum provides Advanced Placement, Honors, Advanced, and Academic classes to fit the needs of each student. The curriculum grew over the first four years to over 130 courses, including 20 Advanced Placement offerings.

The fine arts program, which began with study in visual art, dance and vocal music, expanded to include a comprehensive drama program and 65-piece symphonic band. Meet Me in St. Louis was the first musical performed by the Blessed Trinity Theatrical Alliance, staged in April 2004.

== History ==
The growth in the Catholic population in the metropolitan Atlanta area during the 1990s caused the demand for quality Catholic education to increase. In response to this demand, Archbishop John Francis Donoghue established Catholic Construction Services, Inc. (CCSI) in the fall of 1997, to facilitate the construction of additional Catholic schools.

On January 29, 1999, Archbishop Donoghue broke ground onto a new archdiocesan high school, Blessed Trinity. Construction was briefly halted by the discovery of a shallow grave of Confederate soldiers from the Civil War, but was ultimately resumed and completed in 2000. The construction of the school was overseen by Project Manager Allen Kronenberger of CCSI, who commissioned Hussey, Gay, Bell and DeYoung International, Inc. of Savannah as architects for the project.

Blessed Trinity opened in August 2000 with a total enrollment of 219 students; 164 freshmen and 55 sophomores. The school's reputation led to its rapid growth, with enrollment increasing to 465 by the second year, 680 in the third, 840 in the fourth, and 875 in the fifth. The school's first graduation occurred on May 24, 2003. In 2014, Blessed Trinity was recognized with a blue ribbon award given to schools with overall academic excellence.

== Athletics ==
The athletic program kept pace with the school's growth, and by the fourth year fielded 19 varsity teams, which was expanded to 22 in 2004–2005 with the addition of competition cheerleading and boys' and girls' lacrosse.

Blessed Trinity has risen in the ranks of the state's athletic programs since beginning a varsity athletic program in 2002. BT won the 2004 and 2009 Directors Cup for class AA for having the top athletic program in AA. The school's first state Championship was won by the girls' golf team in May 2003, and the first state championship won by a boys' team was cross country in October 2003. As of November 2019, the school has won 46 state championships. Blessed Trinity was featured on highfive sports team of the week before the football championship in 2014.

Blessed Trinity state championships
Sport	Year(s)
Softball	2007
Volleyball	2006, 2010, 2012, 2014, 2015, 2016, 2018, 2019
Boys' cross country	2003, 2014, 2015
Girls' cross country	2005, 2006, 2013
Boys' track	2021
Boys' tennis	2010, 2013
Girls tennis	2004, 2007, 2008, 2009, 2010, 2011, 2012, 2013, 2014, 2015, 2016
Girls' soccer	2004, 2006, 2007, 2008, 2011, 2021
Boys’ lacrosse	2018, 2021
Girls' lacrosse	2016, 2017, 2018, 2021, 2022
Girls' golf	2003, 2004, 2009, 2014
Boys' golf	2015
Baseball	2006, 2014, 2015
Football	2017, 2018, 2019

== Fine arts ==
The Blessed Trinity Fine Arts Department focuses on the five aspects of the arts. Students' work is showcased in many ways throughout the school year. Artwork is on display in the hallways and there are frequent art shows during intermissions of dance, band, choral, and theatrical shows. There are three opportunities for students' work to be displayed throughout the year, at the midpoint and end of the fall semester, and at the end of the spring semester, and this artwork includes a variety of works from the 12 different Visual Arts classes BT offers: graphic design, photography, drawing I, AP Studio Art, etc. Dance, band, and choir are also classes and rehearse during the school day. The school's a cappella group, the Blessed Trinitones, rehearses after school.

=== Blessed Trinity Theatrical Alliance ===
The BTTA performs three annual shows: a fall musical, a winter play, and a spring musical.

Past fall comedies have included The Werewolf's Curse (2012), Noises Off (2013), The Birds: A Modern Adaptation (2014), Reckless (2015), Figments (2016), and Puffs (2020).

In the fall semester, an elite group of the school's most talented performers rehearse a particularly difficult piece. These have included Into The Woods (2019), The Jungle Book (2018), Chicago (2017), 12 Angry Jurors (2016), Little Women (2014), Working (2013), Metamorphoses (2012) and The Dead (2011).

The spring musical is by far the largest production. Over time, the musicals have grown in size and difficulty. The biggest musical to date was Cats, with a cast of 112. Its opening night also set the record for largest audience, with more than 650 viewers. This production combined the BTTA with the dance program to create the most spectacular production in Blessed Trinity history to date.

Some of the other spring musicals include:

- Footloose, 2025
- 9 to 5, 2024
- Little Shop of Horrors, 2023
- Urinetown, 2019
- The Wizard of Oz, 2018
- BIG: The Musical, 2017
- 9 to 5, 2016
- Pippin, 2015
- Cats, 2014
- How to Succeed in Business Without Really Trying, 2013
- All Shook Up, 2012
- The Drowsy Chaperone, 2011
- Sweet Charity, 2010
- Sweeney Todd: The Demon Barber of Fleet Street, 2009
- The Pajama Game, 2008
- Barnum, 2007
- Annie Get Your Gun, 2006
- Once Upon a Mattress, 2005
- Meet Me In St. Louis, 2004

== Notable alumni ==
- Tyler Flowers (2004) - former MLB catcher
- Matt Skole (2008) - former MLB first baseman
- CJ Abrams (2019) - All-Star shortstop for the Washington Nationals
- JD Bertrand (2019) - linebacker for the Atlanta Falcons
- Steele Chambers (2019) - linebacker for the Memphis Showboats
- JC French (2022) - quarterback for the Georgia Southern Eagles
- Justice Haynes (2023 - transferred) - running back for the Georgia Tech Yellow Jackets
- Riley Jackson (2023) - soccer player for the North Carolina Courage

== See also ==
- List of private schools in Atlanta
- National Catholic Educational Association
