= List of private schools in Atlanta =

This is a list of notable private schools in Atlanta:

== Atlanta proper ==
- Atlanta International School
- Atlanta Speech School
- The Galloway School
- Holy Innocents' Episcopal School
- Holy Spirit Preparatory School
- The Howard School
- The Lovett School
- Pace Academy
- Trinity School
- The Paideia School
- The Schenck School
- The Westminster Schools

== Atlanta metropolitan area ==
- Atlanta Jewish Academy in Sandy Springs and Doraville
- Blessed Trinity Catholic High School in Roswell
- Brandon Hall School in Sandy Springs
- Eagle's Landing Christian Academy in McDonough
- The Epstein School in Sandy Springs
- Greater Atlanta Christian School in Norcross
- Holy Innocents' Episcopal School in Sandy Springs
- Lyndon Academy in Woodstock
- Marist School in Brookhaven
- McGinnis Woods Country Day School in Alpharetta
- Mount Vernon Presbyterian School in Sandy Springs
- Mount Pisgah Christian School in John's Creek
- Our Lady of Mercy Catholic High School in Fayetteville
- Providence Christian Academy in Lilburn
- St. Pius X Catholic High School in Chamblee
- Springmont Montessori in Sandy Springs
- Strong Rock Christian School in Locust Grove, Georgia
- The Walker School in Marietta
- Weber School in Sandy Springs
- Wesleyan School in Peachtree Corners
- Woodward Academy in College Park

== See also ==
- List of schools in Georgia (U.S. state) § Fulton County
