= Mount Vernon High School (Virginia) =

Public high school in Virginia, US

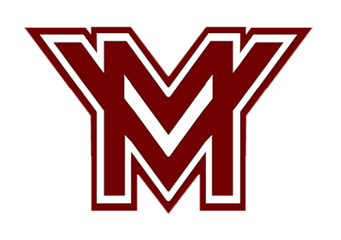

Location
- 8515 Old Mount Vernon Road; Alexandria, Virginia 22309; United States; 38°43′36″N 77°05′32″W

Information
- School type: Public, high school
- Motto: Majors achieve and thrive together with purpose and pride.
- Founded: 1939, 1974 (relocated)
- School district: Fairfax County Public Schools
- Principal: Mr. Cary Dimmick
- Staff: 245
- Grades: 9 – 12
- Enrollment: 2,050 (2016-17)
- Campus: Suburban
- Colors: Maroon and grey
- Nickname: Majors
- Feeder schools: Walt Whitman Middle School
- Rival schools: Edison High School; West Potomac High School
- Athletic conferences: National District; Northern Region
- Website: mountvernonhs.fcps.edu

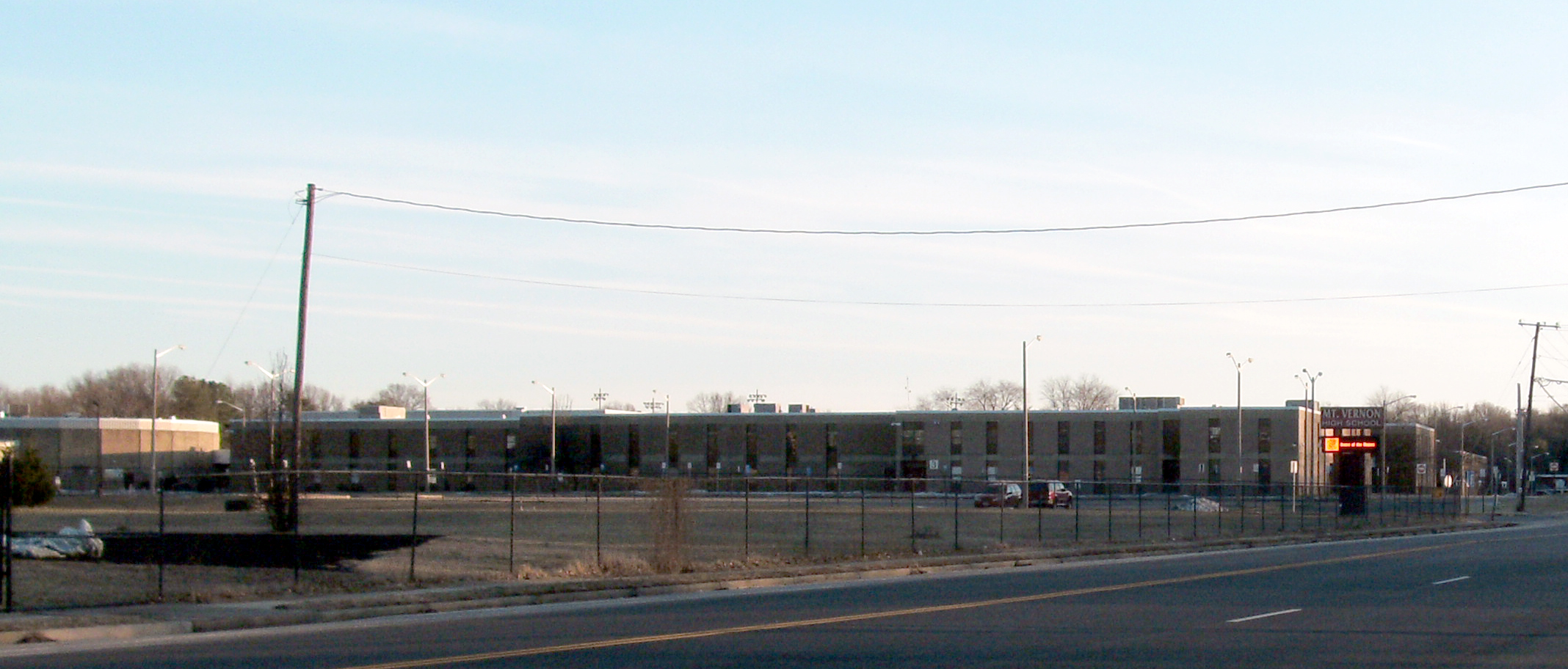
Mount Vernon High School building

Mount Vernon High School is a public high school in the Fairfax County Public Schools system located in Mount Vernon, Virginia.

It is relevant to dependent children living on-post at Fort Belvoir.

== History ==
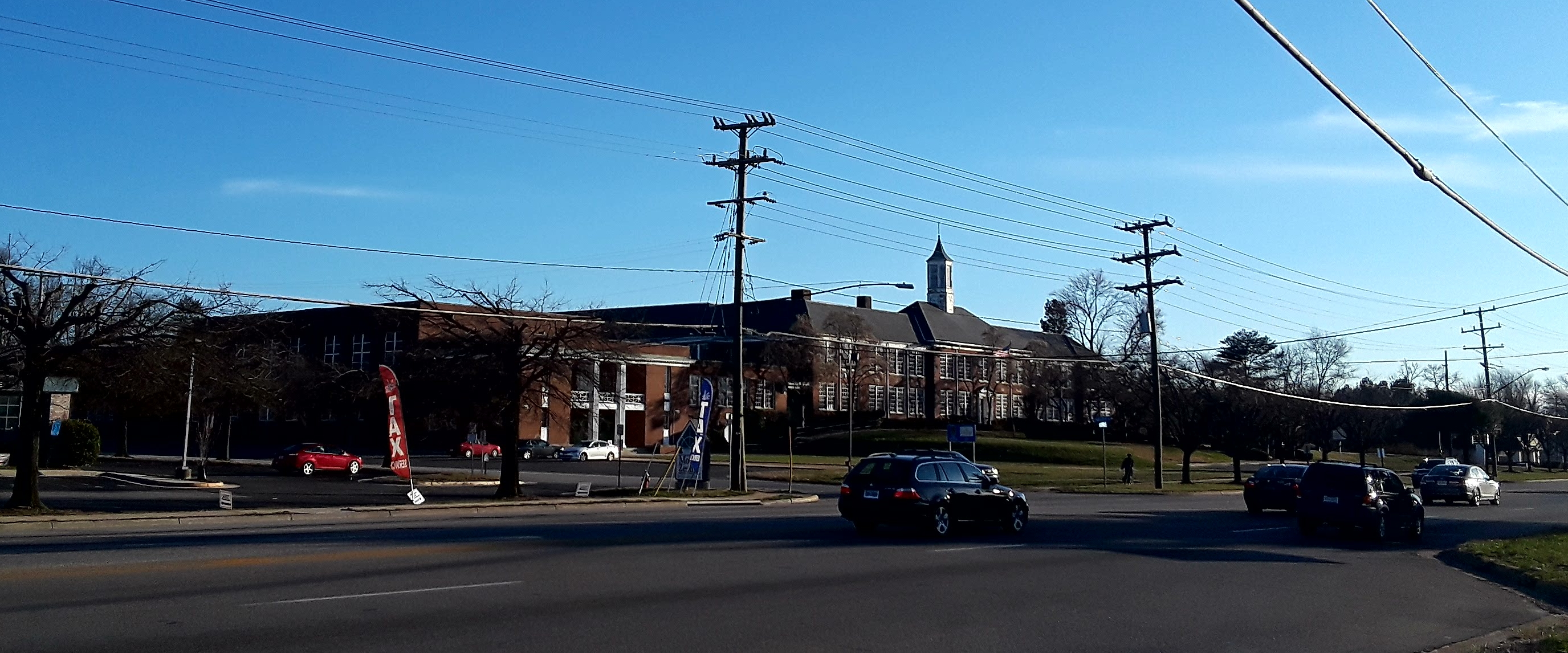
The former Mount Vernon High School building, seen in 2018.

Originally constructed to take the place of the Lee-Jackson High School, Mount Vernon High school first opened in November 1939. With the opening of the school, Lee-Jackson principal G. Claude Cox moved to Mount Vernon, becoming the school's first principal, and Lee-Jackson became an elementary school.

In 1945, Principal Cox resigned to become principal of Wythe High School in Wytheville, Virginia, and Lee-Jackson principal Melvin B. Landes moved to Mount Vernon to begin a nearly thirty-year tenure there.

The school's current location was built in 1961 as Walt Whitman Intermediate School. In 1973, Mount Vernon and Whitman swapped facilities, and the former intermediate school was enlarged to serve its new role as a high school. The original Mount Vernon High School continued to operate as the Walt Whitman Intermediate School until 1985, when Whitman was moved to the former Stephen Foster Intermediate School.

Also in 1973, Principal Melvin Landes retired, and Thomas G. Hyer took over as principal.

Following the departure of Eric Brent to become principal at Forest Park High School in Woodbridge, Nardos King became the principal of MVHS in 2006.

After nine years as principal, Nardos King resigned in 2015 to take a position as Assistant Superintendent of High Schools with the Baltimore County Public Schools system. Assistant Principal Esther Manns became the interim principal of MVHS in September 2015. In February 2016, Rocky Run Middle School Principal Dr. Anthony S. Terrell was announced as the principal of Mount Vernon High School, beginning in March.

The original Mount Vernon High School is still standing on Richmond Highway; it became the Islamic Saudi Academy, which moved to the facility in 1989. This school closed in 2016.

== Academic achievement ==
Students with individual needs are accommodated through special education programs, including English for speakers of other languages (ESOL) program, and Advanced Placement and International Baccalaureate programs. Mount Vernon is an accredited high school. The average SAT score in 2013 for Mount Vernon was a 1417 (479 in Critical Reading, 474 in Math, and 464 in Writing).

== Demographics ==
For the 2014-15 school year, Mount Vernon High School's student body was 37.80% Hispanic, 29.56% Black, 20.91% White, 6.36% Asian and 5.37% Other.

== Athletics ==
School athletic programs feature fall, winter and spring sports, including cheer leading, cross country, field hockey, football, golf, volleyball, basketball, gymnastics, swimming, wrestling, baseball, crew, lacrosse, softball, soccer, tennis, track and intramural sports.

In Mount Vernon's history, it has garnered eight AAA State Championship titles. They won their first title in 1979, in basketball, their second in 1983, for football, their third in 2008 for the swim & dive team, and a fourth in 2013, for soccer, 2015 and 2016 for girls swim and dive, as well as two in 2013 and 2015 and for wrestling.

== Theater ==
Mount Vernon's "Little Theater," officially named "The Andrew Lee Pauley Theater," was dedicated to an English and Drama teacher who retired from the school in 1986. The Little Theater can hold a capacity of more than 400 students.

It is home to MVHS Theatre Arts program, under the direction of theater teacher Jessica Shaw.

== Notable alumni ==
- Callie Brownson, American football coach
- Mickey Bowers, former professional baseball player, scout, coach and manager
- Ed Cunningham, former professional football player and currently TV sports journalist, analyst, and broadcaster.
- Christina Chambers, actress
- Gary Etherington, professional soccer player
- Atlee Hammaker, former Major League Baseball pitcher
- David Knight, former professional American football player
- Tim Koogle, first CEO and President of Yahoo
- Tony Perkins, Chief Weatherman, WTTG-TV.
- Lea Gabrielle, diplomat
- Joe R. Reeder, United States Under Secretary of the Army from 1993 to 1997
- Chuck Robb, former U.S. Senator and Governor of Virginia.
- Markus Rogan, professional swimmer who earned a silver medal in backstroke at the 2004 Olympics
- Bernard Shlesinger, auxiliary bishop of the Archdiocese of Atlanta
- Kyle Soller, actor
- William B. Taylor Jr., U.S. Ambassador to Ukraine 2006-2009
- Syd Thrift, former MLB scout and executive, was baseball coach at Mount Vernon 1953–1956
- Lucian K. Truscott IV, writer and journalist
- Lieutenant General Darryl A. Williams, former Superintendent of the United States Military Academy
