= Holy Spirit College =

Roman Catholic college in Atlanta, GA

Coordinates: 33.877212°N 84.409815°W

- Motto: College of the Holy Spirit
- Type: Private
- Established: 2005 (21 years ago)
- Religious affiliation: Roman Catholic
- Chancellor: Rev. Msgr. Edward J. Dillon, J.C.D.
- President: Gareth N. Genner, L.L.M
- Provost: David Clayton
- Rector: Most Rev. Gregory J. Hartmayer, O.F.M. Conv.
- Location: Atlanta, Georgia, United States
- Website: www.holyspiritcollege.org

Holy Spirit College (HSC) is a private Catholic college located in Atlanta, Georgia, United States. The college describes itself as an "authentic Catholic college" in the spirit of the apostolic constitution Ex corde ecclesiae of Pope John Paul II. Pontifex University is the online counterpart to Holy Spirit College.

== History ==
Holy Spirit College was founded in 2005 as an undergraduate college offering courses in the liberal arts to students of Holy Spirit Preparatory School.

Starting in fall 2010, the college admitted its first class of full-time undergraduate students pursuing bachelor's degrees in philosophy. These students were offered majors in philosophy, theology and Catholic education.

=== Coat of arms ===
The college's coat of arms was created by the heraldic designer James-Charles Noonan, and is blazoned as follows:

Azure, between three fleur de lys, one in bend in the dexter chief point, one in bend sinister in the sinister chief point, one in pale in center base point or, on a nimbus set around the rim with three equidistant bosses or, the dove of the Holy Spirit descending argent flammant proper.

The crest is blazoned as:

On a torse of the colors argent and azure a lamp of learning or, its flames proper.

== Governance ==
The college's chancellor is Monsignor Edward J. Dillon, J.C.D.; the college's president is Gareth N. Genner, and Archbishop Gregory John Hartmayer is rector.

== Campus and student life ==
The college's campus is located on grounds shared with Holy Spirit Parish and Holy Spirit Preparatory School. A Commons Building provides the college with facilities for study, dining and relaxation; the parish complex offers a library and college lecture halls.

== Academics ==
The college was founded for the purpose of providing programs to Holy Spirit Preparatory School leading to an Associate of Arts degree or certificates in philosophy or the liberal arts.

In 2010, the college announced that it planned to expand its course offerings and academic focus. Starting in the fall of 2010, the college now offers a bachelor's degree program, while maintaining an emphasis on theology, philosophy and liberal arts.

After a period of decline, the undergraduate program was reinvigorated and the college began to gear up for the Fall of 2019 when it would begin to recruit students in a more focused manner.

== Affiliations and accreditation ==
Though an independent Catholic college not affiliated with any religious order or congregation, Holy Spirit maintains a close association with Holy Spirit Parish, and the Archdiocese of Atlanta.

The college is authorized to grant degrees by the Georgia Non-Public Secondary Education Commission (GNPEC). The college also maintains memberships in the American Catholic Philosophical Association (ACPA), the Society for Ancient Greek Philosophy, the American Association of Collegiate Registrars and Admissions Officers (AACRAO), the Fellowship of Catholic Scholars, and the Shakespeare Association of America. Holy Spirit is not accredited by the Southern Association of Colleges and Schools, the regional accreditation association which covers Georgia.
