= List of Catholic archbishops of Atlanta =

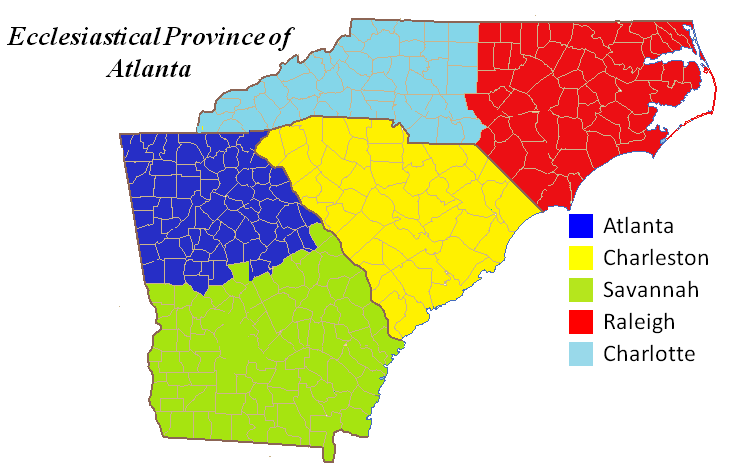
Ecclesiastical Province of Atlanta

The Roman Catholic archbishop of Atlanta is the ordinary of the Archdiocese of Atlanta in Atlanta, Georgia in the United States.

As a metropolitan bishop, the archbishop oversees the entire Ecclesiastical Province of Atlanta which spans the states of Georgia, North Carolina and South Carolina, and consists of the dioceses of Charleston, Charlotte, Raleigh, and Savannah. The archbishop's seat is located in the Cathedral of Christ the King. The chancery, where the archbishop has his office, is located in the Atlanta suburb of Smyrna.

Until 21 May 2019, when he was installed as the archbishop of Washington, the archdiocese was led by Wilton D. Gregory, who was installed as the seventh bishop and sixth archbishop of Atlanta on 17 January 2005. He previously served as bishop of Belleville in Illinois.

== List of archbishops of Atlanta ==
The following is a list of the Roman Catholic archbishops of Atlanta and their terms of service.

1. Francis Edward Hyland (bishop, 1956–1962)
2. Paul John Hallinan (1962–1968)
3. Thomas Andrew Donnellan (1968–1987)
4. Eugene Antonio Marino (1988–1990)
5. James Patterson Lyke (1991–1992)
6. John Francis Donoghue (1993–2004)
7. Wilton Daniel Gregory (2005–2019)
8. Gregory John Hartmayer (2020–)

== See also ==
- Catholic Church hierarchy
- Catholic Church in the United States
- Historical list of the Catholic bishops of the United States
- List of Catholic bishops of the United States
- Lists of patriarchs, archbishops, and bishops
