= Joe R. Reeder =

American public official

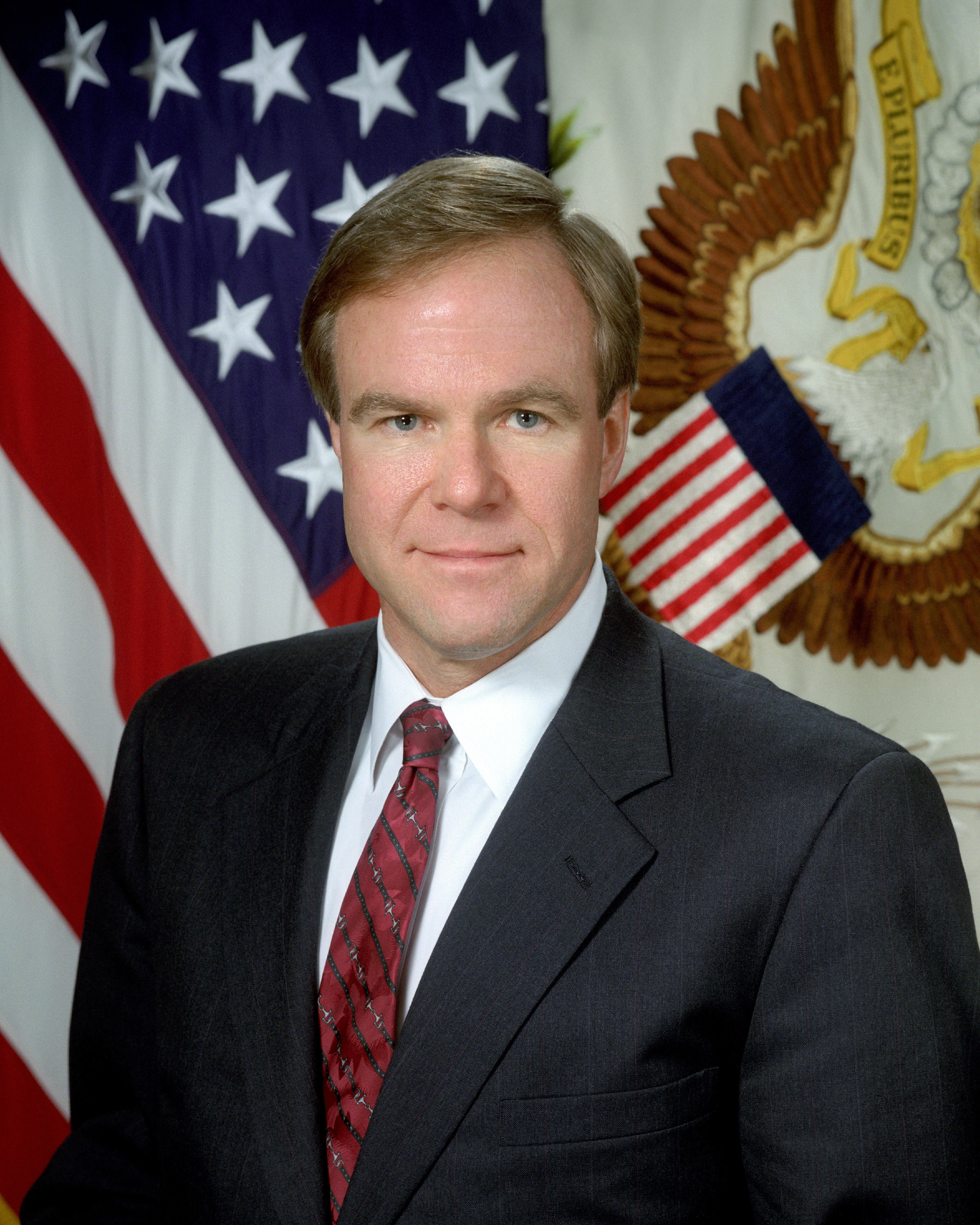
- Official portrait of Joe R. Reeder as United States Under Secretary of the Army

Under Secretary of the Army
- In office November 24, 1993 – November 12, 1997
- President: Bill Clinton
- Preceded by: John W. Shannon
- Succeeded by: Robert M. Walker

Personal details
- Born: Joseph Robert Reeder; November 28, 1947 (age 78) Tacoma, Washington, U.S.
- Education: University of Texas School of Law
- Occupation: Lawyer

Military service
- Allegiance: United States
- Branch/service: United States Army
- Rank: Major
- Unit: 82nd Airborne Division

Joe Robert Reeder (born November 28, 1947) is a United States lawyer who served as United States Under Secretary of the Army from 1993 to 1997.

== Biography ==
Reeder was born on November 28, 1947, in Tacoma, Washington where his father was serving as an Army officer at Fort Lewis. He attended high school in Würzburg, Nuremberg and Frankfurt in West Germany, and then Monmouth Regional High School in New Jersey until June 1965 before graduating from Mount Vernon High School in Virginia in June 1966. After high school, he attended the United States Military Academy, graduating in 1970.

After graduating, Reeder joined the United States Army. He attended airborne, ranger, and artillery basic schools 1971-72 and then served in the 82nd Airborne Division 1972-73, ultimately attaining the rank of major.

In 1972, Reeder entered the University of Texas School of Law, graduating with a J.D. in 1975. He then spent a year clerking in a United States district court in Texas, first for Ben C. Connally and then for Carl O. Bue. He joined the Judge Advocate General's Corps, United States Army in 1976. Following the passage of the Contract Disputes Act of 1978, he spent a year with the Army's Contract Appeals division.

Reeder joined the Washington, D.C. law firm of Patton Boggs in 1979. He spent 1980-81 at the Georgetown University Law Center, completing an LL.M. in October 1982.

In 1993, President of the United States Bill Clinton nominated Reeder as United States Under Secretary of the Army and Reeder subsequently held this office from November 24, 1993, to November 12, 1997. As Under Secretary, he was responsible for long-range planning, material requirements, readiness, acquisition reform, infrastructure reduction, and financial management of the United States Army. He also oversaw the Army's international affairs, especially those related to NATO, Panama, and Latin America; among other things, he served as chairman of the board of directors of the Panama Canal Commission. He was also one of five members of the United States Department of Defense's Base Realignment and Closure Council. He became a member of the American Law Institute in 1994.

Upon leaving the United States Department of the Army in 1997, Reeder returned to Patton Boggs for two years, and then moved to Greenberg Traurig in 1999.

In addition to work as a lawyer, Reeder has been active on the board of governors of the National Defense Industrial Association, the Armed Services YMCA, the United Service Organizations, and other corporate and charitable boards. Since 2009, Reeder has been the chair of the board of the Peace Research Endowment, a charitable entity incorporated in 2009 New York by Peace Research Institute Oslo.

== Personal ==
Reeder is the son of William Thomas "Tom" Reeder (February 28, 1924 – May 6, 1993) and Marilyn Ruth (Parker) Reeder (September 12, 1927 – March 5, 2016) who were married on December 24, 1946 in Laramie, Wyoming. He has three younger brothers. His father was a 1946 West Point graduate who retired from the Army as a colonel in 1973. His maternal grandfather was Sherrow Glenn Parker, who served as Chief Justice of the Wyoming Supreme Court.

Reeder married Katharine Randolph Boyce. He has four daughters.

Government offices
Preceded by John W. Shannon	United States Under Secretary of the Army; November 24, 1993 – November 12, 1997	Succeeded by Robert M. Walker
