= Michael P. W. Stone =

British-American business executive and federal government administrator

Michael Stone
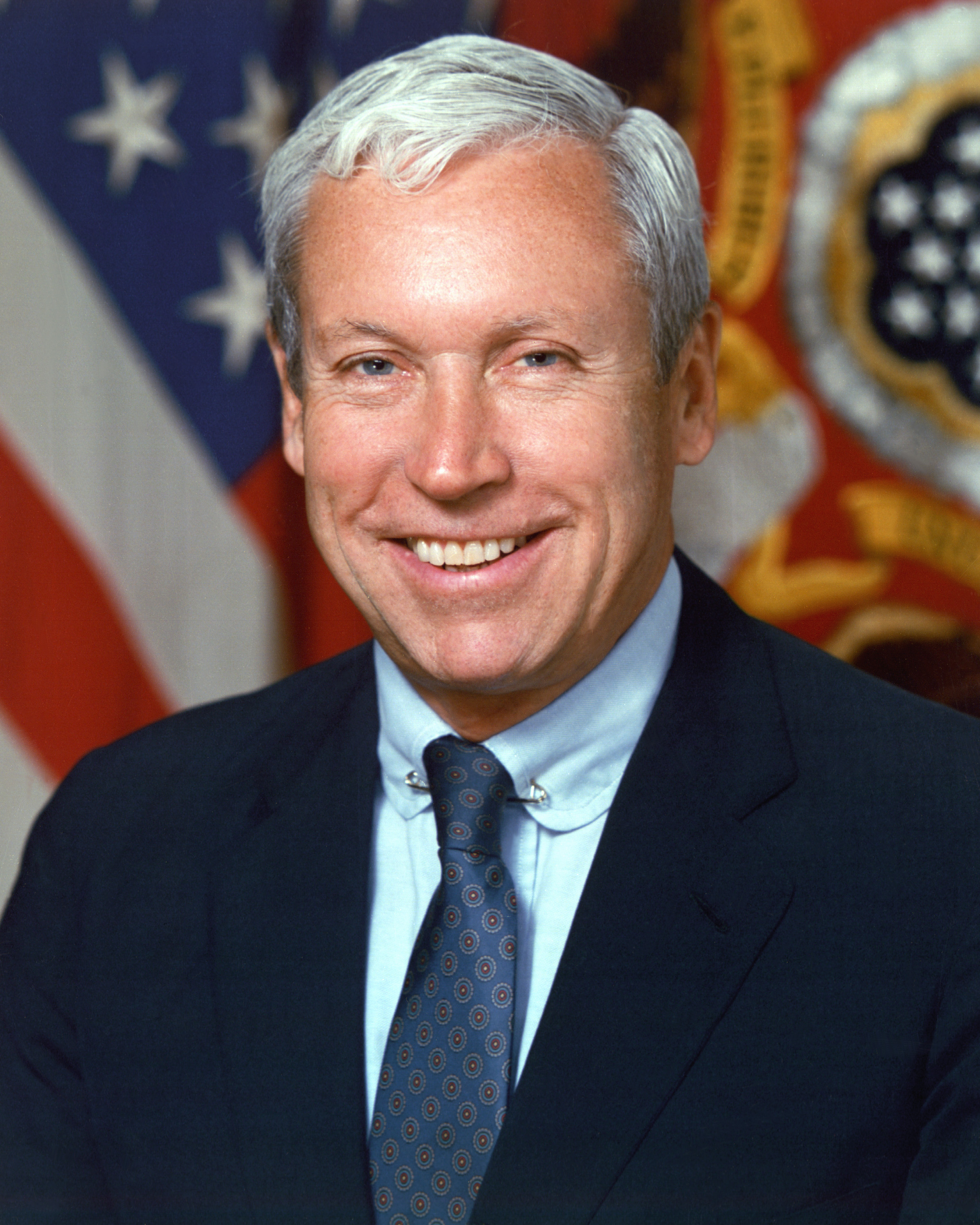
- Official portrait, 1989

15th United States Secretary of the Army
- In office August 14, 1989 – January 20, 1993
- President: George H. W. Bush
- Preceded by: John O. Marsh Jr.
- Succeeded by: Togo D. West Jr.

Personal details
- Born: Michael Patrick William Stone; July 2, 1925 London, England
- Died: May 18, 1995 (aged 69) San Francisco, California, U.S.
- Party: Republican
- Education: Yale University (BA); New York University

Military service
- Allegiance: United States (1929–1995); United Kingdom (1925–1929; 1943–1945)
- Branch/service: Royal Navy
- Years of service: 1943-1945
- Rank: Acting Sub-Lieutenant

Michael Patrick William Stone (June 2, 1925 – May 18, 1995) was a British-American business executive and federal government administrator. He served as the United States Secretary of the Army between 1989 and 1993.

The following is the official military biography (not copyrighted):

Michael P. W. Stone was born in London, England, on 2 June 1925. He came to the U.S. in 1929; served in the British Royal Navy during World War II as an aviator with the Fleet Air Arm of the British Royal Navy and was assigned to the British carrier HMS Glory (R62), operating in the Mediterranean and Far East, 1943-1945 (left Royal Navy with rank of temporary acting Sub-Lieutenant in 1945), received a B.A. degree from Yale University, 1948; studied at New York University Law School, 1948-1949; founding partner in Sterling International, a paper marketing and manufacturing business, 1950-1964; was vice president of that company and several of its subsidiaries including Sterling Vineyards, 1960-1982; was Director of the U.S. Mission in Cairo, Egypt, of the Agency for International Development, 1982-1985; Director of the Agency for International Development Caribbean Basin Initiative, 1985-1988; was Assistant Secretary of the Army (Financial Management), 27 May 1986-12 May 1988; served concurrently as Acting Under Secretary of the Army, 28 February 1988-23 May 1988; was Under Secretary of the Army and Army Acquisition Executive, 24 May 1988-13 August 1989; while serving as Army Under Secretary, performed the duties of the Under Secretary of Defense for Acquisition, 13 May 1989-10 August 1989; was Secretary of the Army, 14 August 1989-19 January 1993; chairman of the board of the Panama Canal Commission, 1990-1993; died in San Francisco, California, 18 May 1995.

Stone attended The Taft School for five years, graduating in 1942. He continued his studies at Yale University, but dropped out to join the Royal Navy. Stone received his flight training in the United States. He returned to Yale after the war to complete his undergraduate degree.

Government offices
Preceded by James R. Ambrose	United States Under Secretary of the Army; May 1988 – August 1989	Succeeded by John W. Shannon
Preceded by John O. Marsh, Jr.	United States Secretary of the Army; August 1989 – January 1993	Succeeded by Togo D. West, Jr.
