= Our Lady of Mercy Catholic High School (Georgia) =

Our Lady of Mercy High School

Location
- 861 Highway 279; Fayetteville, (Fayette County), Georgia 30214; United States; 33°32′53″N 84°27′44″W

Information
- Type: Private / co-ed / secondary
- Religious affiliation: Roman Catholic
- Established: 2000
- Locale: Urban, fringe of large city
- Faculty: 38
- Grades: 9–12
- Colors: Red and white
- Team name: Bobcats
- Accreditation: Southern Association of Colleges and Schools
- Website: https://www.mercycatholic.org/default.asp

Our Lady of Mercy Catholic High School is a private, Catholic high school in Fayetteville, Georgia, United States. It is located in the Roman Catholic Archdiocese of Atlanta. It is a Catholic college-preparatory high school located and one of several schools established by Archbishop John F. Donoghue.

Our Lady of Mercy Catholic High School opened to freshman and sophomore classes in August 2000.

OLM is fully accredited through District-Wide Accreditation of The Office of Catholic Schools. Each school maintains full accreditation through AdvancED (the parent company of SACS – Southern Association of Colleges and Schools).

== Merging of schools ==
On January 22, 2021, it was announced that the schools of Our Lady of Mercy High School and Our Lady of Victory Catholic School would merge into a new PK-12 school at the Our Lady of Mercy campus. This new school would be called St. Mary's Academy, and the first school year officially started on August 8, 2022.

== Filming location ==
The school served as the filming location for the high school scenes in Stephen Chbosky's 2021 film adaptation of Broadway musical Dear Evan Hansen.

The school also served as a filming location in an episode of R.L. Stine's Just Beyond on Disney+ in the episode "Which Witch?"

== Notable alumni ==
- Christian Coleman - (2014) professional track and field athlete

== See also ==
- National Catholic Educational Association
