= James Patterson Lyke =

American Catholic prelate (1939–1992)

His Excellency, The Most Reverend James Patterson Lyke OFM
- Archbishop of Atlanta
- See: Atlanta
- Installed: June 24, 1991
- Term ended: December 27, 1992
- Predecessor: Eugene Antonio Marino
- Successor: John Francis Donoghue
- Other posts: Auxiliary Bishop of Cleveland (1979–1990); Apostolic Administrator of Atlanta (1990–1991)

Orders
- Ordination: June 24, 1966 by William Aloysius O'Connor
- Consecration: August 1, 1979 by James Aloysius Hickey

Personal details
- Born: February 18, 1939 Chicago, Illinois, U.S.
- Died: December 27, 1992 (aged 53) Atlanta, Georgia, U.S.
- Buried: Arlington Memorial Park in Sandy Springs, Georgia, U.S.
- Denomination: Catholic Church
- Education: Quincy College; St. Joseph Theological Seminary; Union Graduate School
- Motto: Christus pax Christ is peace

Styles of James Patterson Lyke
- Reference style: His Excellency; The Most Reverend
- Spoken style: Your Excellency
- Religious style: Bishop

James Patterson Lyke, O.F.M. (February 18, 1939 – December 27, 1992) was an African-American Catholic prelate who served as archbishop of Atlanta in Georgia from 1991 to 1992. He previously served as an auxiliary bishop of the Diocese of Cleveland in Ohio from 1979 to 1990. He was the second African-American archbishop in history.

== Biography ==
=== Early life ===
James Lyke was born on February 18, 1939, on the South Side of Chicago, Illinois, the youngest of seven children of Amos and Ora (née Sneed) Lyke. Amos Lyke abandoned the family, leaving Ora Lyke to raise the children in impoverished surroundings, relying on welfare checks. The family lived in an apartment with no beds and a coal stove before moving to Wentworth Gardens, a low-income housing project in Chicago.

Ora Lyke, a Baptist, sent James Lyke to St. George Catholic School when he was in the fourth grade to keep him out of trouble. She washed the St. George Church laundry to help pay the school tuition. She and six of her children later converted to Catholicism.

Deciding to become a priest, James Lyke joined the Franciscan order in 1959, studying at the St. Francis Novitiate in Teutopolis, Illinois. He later obtained his Bachelor of Arts degree in philosophy at Our Lady of Angels House of Philosophy through Quincy College in Quincy, Illinois. He received a Master of Divinity degree from St. Joseph Theological Seminary in Teutopolis, Illinois.

=== Priesthood ===
Lyke was ordained a priest at St. Francis Church in Teutopolis on June 24, 1966, by Bishop William O’Connor. After his 1966 ordination, the Franciscans assigned Lyke to teach at Padua High School in Cleveland. While at Padua, Lyke led the local Operation Breadbasket campaign to help the African-American community.

After the assassination of Dr. Martin Luther King Jr. in Memphis, Tennessee, in 1968, Lyke requested that the Franciscans assign him to a parish in Tennessee. They sent him to serve as pastor to St. Thomas Parish in Memphis, becoming the first African-American priest in Tennessee. During this period, he also served as president of the National Office for Black Catholics.

In 1977, the Franciscans appointed Lyke as director of the Newman Center at Grambling State University in Grambling, Louisiana.

=== Auxiliary Bishop of Cleveland ===
Pope John Paul II named Lyke as an auxiliary bishop of Cleveland and titular bishop of Furnos Major on June 30, 1979. He was consecrated in Cleveland by Bishop James Hickey (future Archbishop and Cardinal) on August 1, 1979. Lyke obtained a Doctor of Theology degree in 1981 from the Union Graduate School in Cincinnati, Ohio. While serving as auxiliary bishop, Lyke coordinated the group that produced Lead Me, Guide Me: The African American Catholic Hymnal in 1987.

=== Archbishop of Atlanta ===
After the resignation of Archbishop Eugene Marino due to scandal, the college of consultors for the archdiocese appointed Lyke as apostolic administrator of Atlanta on July 10, 1990. John Paul II appointed him as archbishop there on April 30, 1991, and he was installed on June 24, 1991.

=== Death ===
Lyke died of kidney cancer in Atlanta on December 27, 1992. At the time of his death, Lyke was the highest-ranking African-American Catholic clergyman in the nation.

== Legacy ==
The following institutions have been named after Lyke:

- The Lyke House Catholic Newman Center at the Atlanta University Center
- Archbishop Lyke School in Cleveland
- The Archbishop Lyke Conference, a yearly African-American liturgical conference

Catholic Church titles
Preceded by Eugene Antonio Marino	Archbishop of Atlanta; 1990–1992	Succeeded by John Francis Donoghue
