= Paul John Hallinan =

American Catholic prelate and civil rights activist (1911–1968)

His Excellency, The Most Reverend Paul John Hallinan
- Archbishop of Atlanta
- See: Atlanta
- Installed: March 29, 1962
- Term ended: March 27, 1968
- Predecessor: Francis Edward Hyland
- Successor: Thomas Andrew Donnellan
- Other post: Bishop of Charleston (1958- 1962)

Orders
- Ordination: February 20, 1937 by Joseph Schrembs
- Consecration: October 28, 1958 by Amleto Giovanni Cicognani

Personal details
- Born: April 8, 1911 Painesville, Ohio, U.S.
- Died: March 27, 1968 (aged 56) Atlanta, Georgia, U.S.
- Denomination: Roman Catholic Church
- Education: University of Notre Dame; St. Mary's Seminary; John Carroll University
- Motto: Ut diligatis invicem (That you love one another)

Styles of Paul John Hallinan
- Reference style: His Excellency; The Most Reverend
- Spoken style: Your Excellency
- Religious style: Archbishop

Paul John Hallinan (April 8, 1911 – March 27, 1968) was an American prelate of the Roman Catholic Church. He served as bishop of Charleston in South Carolina (1958 – 1962) and as archbishop of Atlanta in Georgia (1962 – 1968). Hallinan was known as a champion of racial equality and liturgical reform.

== Biography ==
=== Early life ===
Paul Hallinan was born on April 8, 1911, in Painesville, Ohio, to Clarence C. and Rose Jane (née Laracy) Hallinan. All of his grandparents immigrated from Ireland. From 1924 to 1928, he attended Cathedral Latin School in Cleveland, Ohio, where he edited the high school yearbook.

Hallinan then studied at the University of Notre Dame in Indiana, earning a Bachelor of Arts degree in philosophy in 1932. He edited the college yearbook and worked for the Painesville Telegraph during his summer vacations. After graduating from college, Hallinan studied theology at St. Mary's Seminary in Cleveland.

=== Priesthood ===
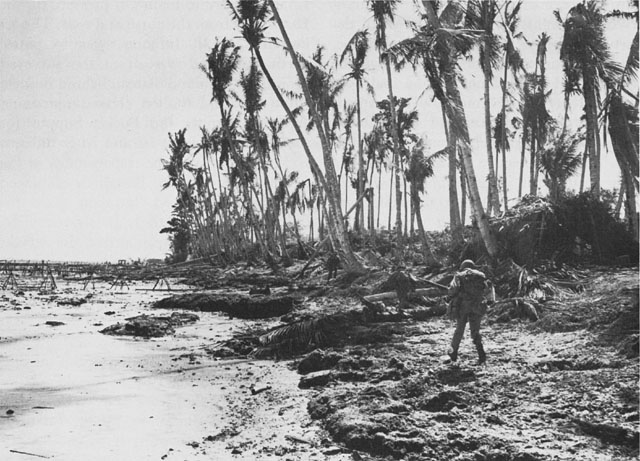
Biak Island, Dutch East Indies (1944)

Hallinan was ordained to the priesthood for the Diocese of Cleveland on February 20, 1937, by Archbishop Joseph Schrembs. His first assignment was as a curate at St. Aloysius Parish in Cleveland, where he remained for five years. After the American entry into World War II in December 1941, Hallinan in 1942 enlisted in the US Army Chaplain Corps. He was stationed with the 542nd Engineer Amphibian Regiment in Australia, New Guinea, and the Philippines. Holding the rank of captain, Hallinan was wounded in action on Biak Island in the Dutch East Indies, receiving a Purple Heart in 1944.

After the war ended in 1945, Hallinan was discharged from the Army. The diocese then assigned him as a curate at St. John's Cathedral in Cleveland. He was named the director of the Newman Clubs in the diocese in 1947, a position he would hold for the next 11 years. Using the US Government G.I. Bill to finance his graduate school education, he earned a Master of Arts degree from John Carroll University in University Heights, Ohio, in 1953. From 1952 to 1954, Hallinan served as national chaplain of the National Newman Club Federation. The Vatican elevated him to monsignor during this time as well. Clarence Hallinan, who died in 1955, lived the last three years of his life with his son while he was assigned as a chaplain at Western Reserve University in Cleveland

=== Bishop of Charleston ===
On September 9, 1958, Hallinan was appointed the eighth bishop of Charleston by Pope Pius XII. He received his episcopal consecration on October 28, 1958, from Archbishop Amleto Giovanni Cicognani, with Archbishop Edward Hoban and Bishop John Krol serving as co-consecrators. His installation took place at the Cathedral of St. John the Baptist in Charleston on November 25, 1958. Hallinan selected as his episcopal motto: Ut Diligatis Invicem, meaning, "That You Love One Another" (John 15:12).

=== Archbishop of Atlanta ===
The Diocese of Atlanta was raised to the rank of archdiocese, and Hallinan was named its first archbishop, by Pope John XXIII on February 19, 1962. His installation took place at the Cathedral of Christ the King in Atlanta on March 29, 1962. In 1963, Hallinan earned a doctorate in history from Western Reserve University in Cleveland; his dissertation was on Richard Gilmour, the bishop of Cleveland from 1872 to 1891.

During his six years as archbishop, Hallinan opened several churches and missions, as well as the John Lancaster Spalding Catholic Center at the University of Georgia in Athens, Georgia. He transferred the St. Joseph's Boys Home in Washington, Georgia to Atlanta and converted it into the Village of St. Joseph for boys and girls. He also established The Georgia Bulletin, the weekly archdiocesan newspaper.

In an attempt to increase the role of the laity in the church, Hallinan appointed more than 125 lay men and women to ecclesiastical positions. He also called the first Lay Congress in the archdiocese.In his final years, he was assisted in the governance of the archdiocese by his protégé, Auxiliary Bishop Joseph Bernardin, who would later become a cardinal and archbishop of Chicago.

=== Illness and death ===
Hallinan contracted hepatitis after returning from the second session of the Second Vatican Council in Rome in December 1963. He was hospitalized for almost seven months. Hallinan never fully regained his health, suffering from recurring bouts of hepatitis for the rest of his life. Hallinan died on March 27, 1968, at his residence in Atlanta in 1968, aged 57.

== Viewpoints ==
=== Civil rights ===
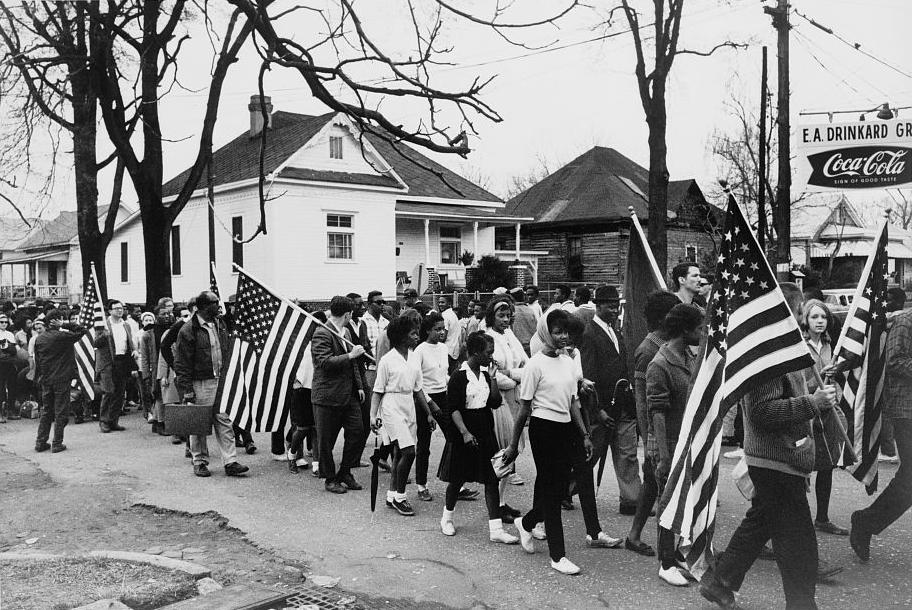
Selma-to-Montgomery March, Alabama (1965)

Recognized by Time Magazine in 1968 as one of the "foremost advocates of social and religious liberalism" in the American South, Hallinan became known for his personal dedication to the American civil rights movement and the cause of racial equality. In February 1961, he issued a pastoral letter in which he wrote,

"With racial tension mounting, the Church must speak out clearly. In justice to our people, we cannot abandon leadership to the extremists whose only creed is fear and hatred."

However, Hallian delayed full racial integration at Catholic institutions in Charleston out of fear for the safety of African American students. Explaining this decision to Time Magazine in March 1961, he said,

"The Catholics are 1.3% of the population in our state. If the full federal power cannot carry this off, it's fatuous to think we can. I would take the risk on high moral principles, but it would be a hollow victory if it wrecked our school system or did harm to our children."

Hallinan's first act as archbishop in Atlanta was to order the racial integration of all Catholic institutions under his jurisdiction.

"To call this action courageous is a reflection on this community. We decided to move at this time to desegregate archdiocesan schools, first, because it's right, and second, because an excellent climate of opinion and action already exists here."

In 1964, Hallinan co-sponsored a banquet honoring Dr. Martin Luther King Jr. after he received the Nobel Peace Prize. He praised King as a "pioneer in a new dynamic of peace, expressed in the formula, 'I will walk in liberty, O Lord, because I seek thy precepts' (Psalms 119:45)." Hallinan also sent priests and nuns to participate in the 1965 Selma to Montgomery marches In Alabama. He encouraged Atlanta Catholics to open their neighborhoods "so Negroes can exercise the right of every American to live where he wishes."

=== Ecumenism ===
Hallinan was also an advocate of ecumenism, and once wrote,

"Never has this longing for Christian unity been more evident...We are growing more conscious that the Holy Spirit of God, brooding over our distressed world and our divided Christendom, is stirring now the souls of men in many places, providing the light and strength without which reunion remains an empty dream."

=== Second Vatican Council ===
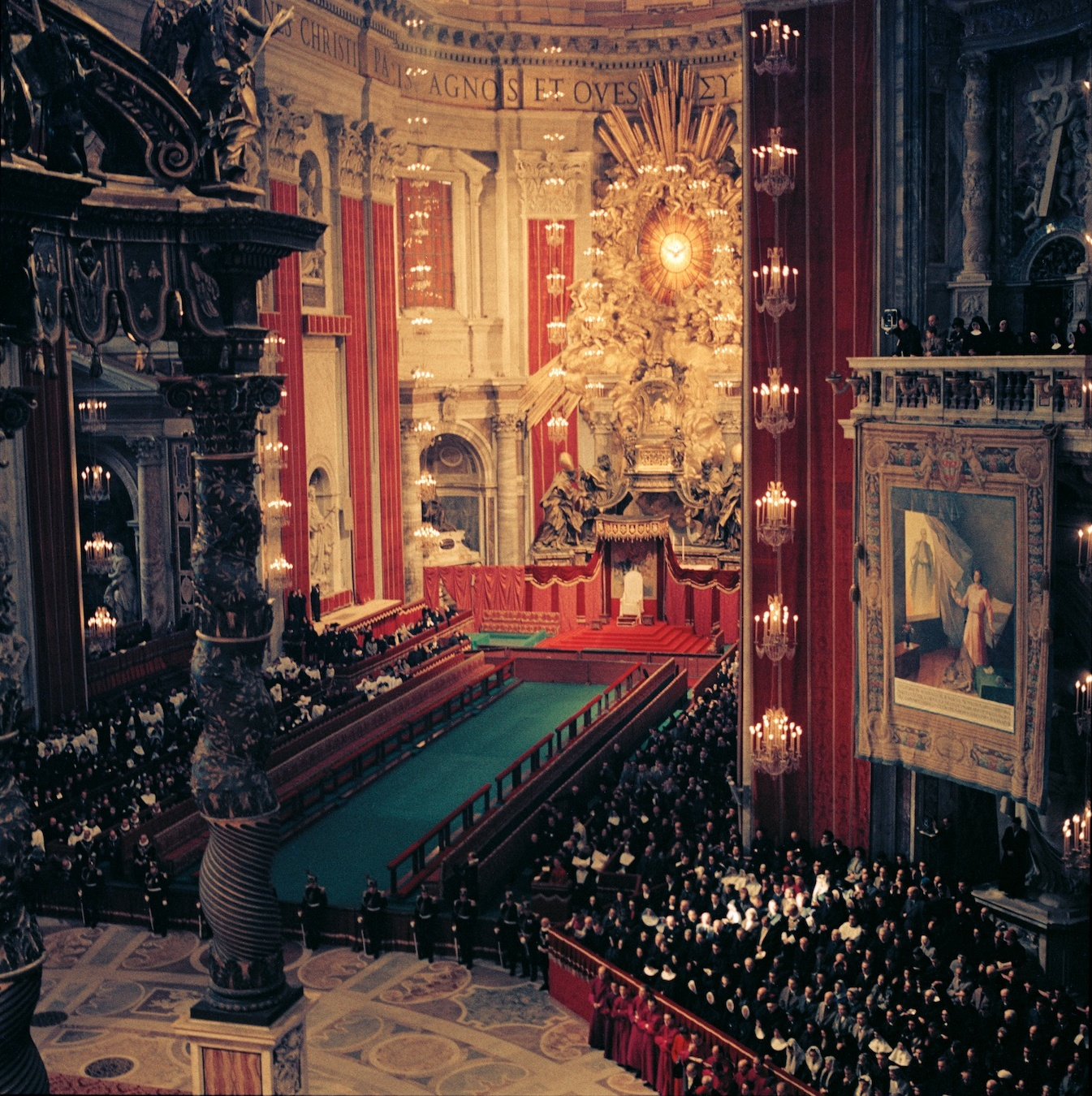
Second Vatican Council, Rome, Italy

Between 1962 and 1965, Hallinan attended all four sessions of the Second Vatican Council in Rome. Appointed to the council's Commission on the Sacred Liturgy, he became a prominent advocate for the use of the vernacular in the mass. He described Sacrosanctum Concilium, the council's 1963 constitution on the liturgy, as "a vote against old ideas...[it] paves the way for everything else." In one of his last talks, he said,

"Through the Sacred Constitution on the Liturgy, we are now emerging from a period of fixity and rigidity which was unnatural in the Church's life."

Hallinan befriended Catholic progressives, such as the theologian Reverend Hans Küng and Cardinal Leo Joseph Suenens. In July 1964, Hallinan published a pamphlet, How to Understand Changes in the Liturgy, that was distributed throughout the United States and abroad. He later served as chairman of the U.S. Bishops' Committee on the Liturgy and as member of the International Commission on English in the Liturgy.

Hallinan supported the cautious approach of Pope Paul VI towards internal renewal in the church, saying in 1965, "We need some kind of brake for safety's sake. If we move too fast, we may not have time to communicate properly with our clergy and our laymen". Hallinan sat on the board of trustees of the Catholic University of America, and opposed their removal in 1967 of liberal theologian Charles Curran from the university.

=== Vietnam War ===
Hallinan was a staunch opponent of American involvement in the Vietnam War. At a study conference of the Clergy and Laymen Concerned about Vietnam (CALCAV), he declared, "Our conscience and our voice must be raised against the savagery and terror of war." In August 1967, he was one of four American Catholic bishops who endorsed the Negotiation Now! campaign to end the war.

Catholic Church titles
Preceded by John Joyce Russell	Bishop of Charleston; 1958–1962	Succeeded by Francis Frederick Reh
Preceded by Francis Edward Hyland	Archbishop of Atlanta; 1962–1968	Succeeded by Thomas Andrew Donnellan
