= Donovan Catholic School =

Independent, Roman Catholic high school in Athens, Georgia, United States

Location
- 590 Lavender Road; Athens, Clarke, Georgia 30606; United States
- 33°59′32″N 83°27′1″W

Information
- Type: Private, coeducational
- Motto: To Radiate the Lord
- Religious affiliation: Roman Catholic
- Established: 2003
- School code: 110138
- Head of school: Dr. Ashli Walker
- Grades: 7–12
  - Other: Dual-Enrollment
- Student to teacher ratio: 9:1
- Colors: Navy blue, silver and white
- Athletics conference: GIAA
- Sports: Football, Volleyball, Cross Country, Cheerleading, Soccer, Basketball, Swimming, Tennis, Baseball, Golf, Track
- Mascot: Ram
- Accreditation: Southern Association of Colleges and Schools
- School fees: $85
- Tuition: $14,245
- Affiliation: National Catholic Educational Association
- Website: donovancatholicathens.org

Donovan Catholic School (Donovan) is an independent, Roman Catholic intermediate and high school located in Athens, Georgia, United States.

== Mission ==
The mission of Donovan Catholic School as a Catholic college-preparatory school is to develop leaders with the competence, conscience, compassion, confidence, and courage who, out of love for Christ and others, will radiate Christ in their lives.

== Academics ==
Donovan offers a challenging academic program that serves as an excellent preparation for college. There are currently 15 AP classes offered including: World History, United States History, English Language, English Literature, Pre-Calculus, Statistics, Biology, Environmental Science, Computer Science Principles, Latin, Spanish Language, Spanish Literature, Art, Seminar, and Research.

== Athletics ==
Donovan is a member of the Georgia Independent School Association (GISA). School teams compete in football, volleyball, cross country, soccer, basketball, swimming, tennis, baseball, track, and golf. The Donovan boys' basketball team was the GISA State Champion in 2024.

== See also ==
- National Catholic Educational Association
