= Howard High School =

Howard High School may refer to:

- David T. Howard High School, a former high school in Atlanta, Georgia, U.S.
- Howard High School of Technology, in Wilmington, Delaware, U.S.
- Howard High School (Maryland), in Ellicott City, Maryland, U.S.
- Howard High School (Macon, Georgia)
- Howard High School, in Howard, Kansas, U.S.
- Howard High School (Florida), a segregated high school in Ocala, Florida, closed in 1968.
- Howard High School (Nashville, Tennessee), a high school for blacks in Tennessee
- The former name of Marquette Senior High School, in Marquette, Michigan, U.S.
- Howard School of Academics and Technology in Chattanooga, Tennessee

== See also ==
- Howard School (disambiguation)
