= Holy Spirit Preparatory School =

Location
- 4449 Northside Drive; Atlanta, Georgia 30327; United States; 33°52′38″N 84°24′42″W

Information
- Type: Private, parochial, college preparatory
- Motto: Ministrare non Ministari (To Serve not to be Served)
- Religious affiliation: Roman Catholic
- Established: 1996
- CEEB code: 110-151
- Rector: Msgr. Edward Dillon
- Principal: Michelle Bertany, Upper School; Pete Radosta, Lower School; Georgia Tate, Preschool Director
- Head of school: Dan King CEO of Dan Young King LLC
- Chaplain: Fr. Juan Pablo Duran
- Staff: 100
- Grades: Pre-kindergarten-12th
- Gender: Co-educational
- Hours in school day: 7
- Campus type: Suburban
- Colors: Green and Gold
- Athletics conference: Georgia Independent School Association; 1 AAA
- Mascot: Cougar
- Nickname: Cougars
- Team name: Holy Spirit Cougars & Lady Cougars
- Accreditation: Southern Association of Colleges and Schools
- USNWR ranking: Top 50 Catholic High Schools in the USA
- Tuition: $22,070–$25,225 (2023-24)
- Affiliation: National Catholic Educational Association
- Website: holyspiritprep.org

Holy Spirit Preparatory School (abbreviated HSP) is an independent, Roman Catholic preparatory school located in Atlanta and Sandy Springs, Georgia. It was originally established in 1996 as Donnellan School.

== Location and administration ==
Pre-K4 through 7th grade are located on a multi-acre site at 4820 Long Island Drive. The preschool program is located at 4465 Northside Drive on the lower level of Holy Spirit Catholic Church, adjacent to the 57,000 sq ft (5,300 m^{2}) Upper School campus, which opened in the fall of 2005.

The elementary campus is in Sandy Springs while the preschool and upper school are in Atlanta.

Although an independent Catholic school, it is closely tied to Holy Spirit Catholic Church. The pastor of the parish, Monsignor Edward Dillon, serves on the school board.

== Curriculum ==
Holy Spirit Preparatory School offers a classically inspired curriculum in Latin, and instructs students in Catholic theology as well as typical college preparatory subjects and numerous electives.

The school's Classics department describes its program as being "designed around an awareness of the historical significance of the Greek and Latin languages as foundations for the Western intellectual tradition and the history of the Catholic Church."

Upper School students are also required to complete community service and "school service" hours in order to graduate.

=== Athletics ===
The school offers a number of student athletics programs, including cross country running, soccer, baseball, basketball, cheer leading, clay targets, golf, swimming, tennis, track and field, and volleyball.

Holy Spirit Preparatory School also fields a football program. The team originally participated in the Glory for Christ (GFC) league, winning the GFC State Championship in 2011. At the close of their 2013-14 season, Holy Spirit Prep announced they would return to the Georgia Independent School Association's football league.

== House system ==
Holy Spirit Preparatory School has a house system. There are four houses, each named after Ecumenical Councils, and each house has its own mascot, color, and patron saint:

- House of Chalcedon: Cerberus – purple – St. Thomas Aquinas
- House of Trent: Dragon – blue – St. Anthony of Padua
- House of Lyons: Lion – orange – St. Jude
- House of Nicaea: Eagle – red – St. Peter

Holy Spirit's house system divides students and teachers randomly into four groups. There is competition between these houses in order to win a grand prize at the end of the year. The house point system works by enforcing positive behavior, such as volunteering for service opportunities, holding a door, helping teachers carry things, or cleaning the boards. House points cannot be deducted. Teachers may not earn house points. There are also house challenges in which members of each house compete in sporting and academic events Administrators, the Head Boy, and Head Girl are placed in a neutral house, called the "Vatican." The Head Boy and Head Girl cannot earn house points. Each house has a house government led by the house master, the house president, and the house vice president.

== Ranking and accreditation ==
Holy Spirit Prep has been repeatedly named as one of the top fifty Catholic high schools in the country by the National Catholic High School Honor Roll. In 2009 the Lower School was named as a National School of Excellence by the US Department of Education.

The school is accredited by the Southern Association of Colleges and Schools and the Southern Association of Independent Schools (SAIS) and is a member of the Southern Association of Independent Schools and the Georgia Association of Independent Schools (GISA).

Holy Spirit College, an outgrowth of the preparatory school, is a Georgia Non-Public Secondary Education Commission authorized degree-granting institution. Dr. Matthew McWhorter serves as Academic Coordinator of the college and is advised by a Board of Visitors.

== History ==
The school was established as an independent Catholic school in 1996. It was named after former archbishop Thomas A. Donnellan. In 2002, the school broke ground on a new Upper School campus adjacent to Holy Spirit Catholic Church. In 2006, the school celebrated its first graduating senior class. Holy Spirit Prep is recognized by the Archdiocese of Atlanta and listed in the Official Catholic Directory as a lay sponsored Catholic school independent of any religious order or congregation.

== Notable alumni ==
- Anthony Edwards, five-star rated basketball player for the Georgia Bulldogs, participated in the 2019 McDonald's All-American Boys Game, and #1 pick in the 2020 NBA draft.

== See also ==
- List of private schools in Atlanta
- National Catholic Educational Association
