= James R. Ambrose =

American aerospace executive (1922–2017)

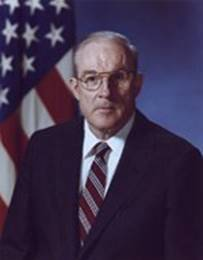
- James R. Ambrose

United States Under Secretary of the Army
- In office October 1981 – February 1988
- Preceded by: Robert Harry Spiro, Jr.
- Succeeded by: Michael P. W. Stone

Personal details
- Born: August 16, 1922 Brewer, Maine, U.S.
- Died: January 16, 2017 (aged 94)
- Education: University of Maine
- Occupation: Aerospace executive
- Known for: United States Under Secretary of the Army

James Richard Ambrose (August 16, 1922 – January 16, 2017) was an American aerospace executive who was United States Under Secretary of the Army from 1981 to 1988.

== Biography ==
James R. Ambrose was born in Brewer, Maine. He was educated at the University of Maine, graduating in 1943. He also studied at Georgetown University, The Catholic University of America, and the University of Maryland, but did not receive degrees from any of those institutions.

During World War II, Ambrose worked at the United States Naval Research Laboratory, and stayed on there after the war. While there, he worked on radar, semiconductors, nuclear weapons, and nuclear reactors.

In late 1955, Ambrose was one of the co-founders of Systems Research Corporation. Systems Research Corporation was subsequently acquired by the Ford Motor Company, laying the foundation for what would become Ford Aerospace. Ambrose worked in management at Ford Aerospace for thirty-six years. He worked mainly on technical aspects of defense systems, space programs, and communications, command, and control systems. From 1968 to 1981, Ambrose held the title of Vice President for Technical Affairs of Ford Aerospace.

On September 30, 1981, President of the United States Ronald Reagan nominated Ambrose as United States Under Secretary of the Army. After Senate confirmation, Ambrose held this office from October 1981 until February 1988. He died in January 2017 at the age of 94.

Government offices
Preceded by Robert Harry Spiro, Jr.	United States Under Secretary of the Army; October 1981 – February 1988	Succeeded by Michael P. W. Stone
