= John W. Shannon =

American politician (1933–2017)

John Shannon
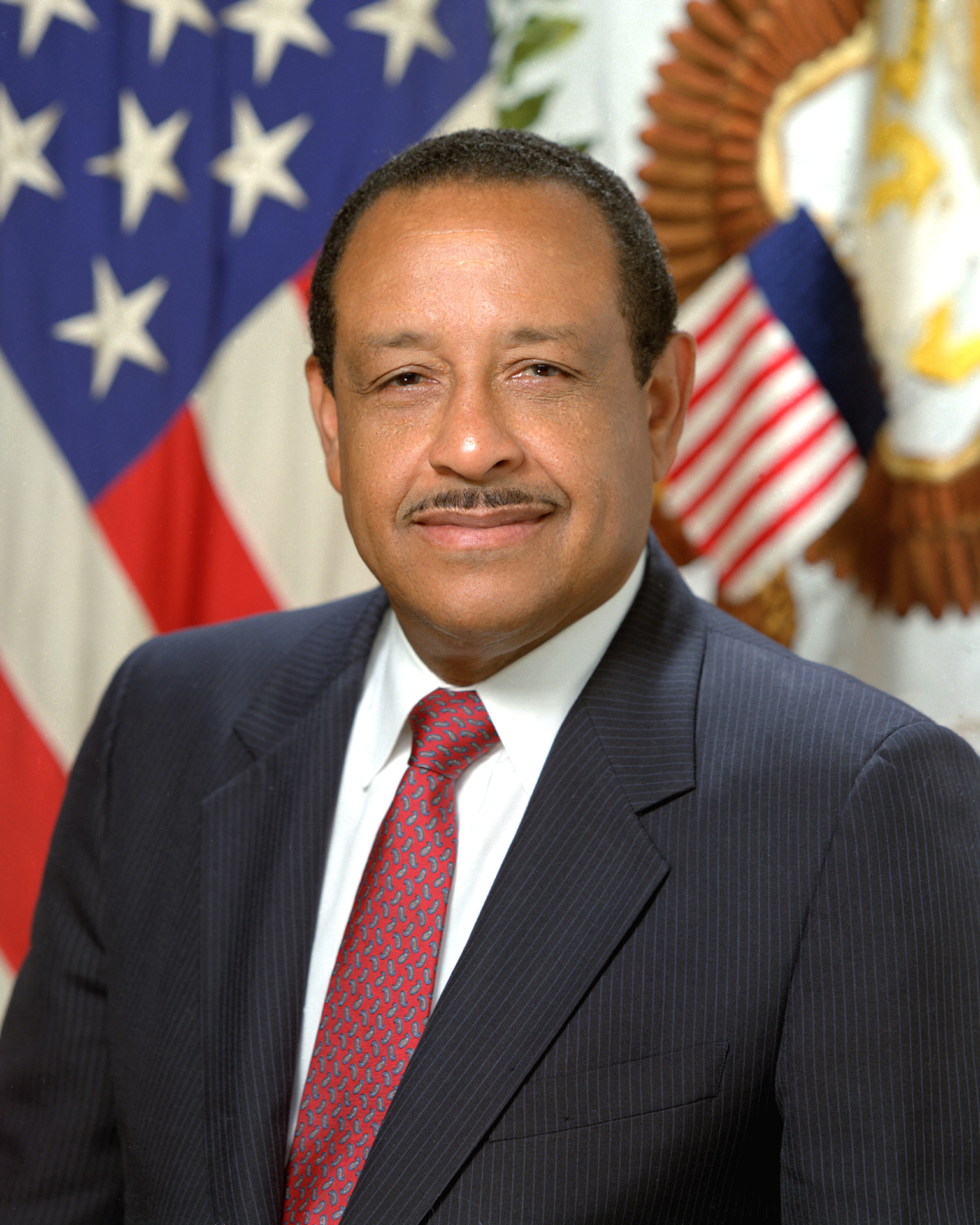
- Official portrait, 1989

United States Secretary of the Army Acting
- In office January 20, 1993 – August 26, 1993
- President: Bill Clinton
- Preceded by: Michael P. W. Stone
- Succeeded by: Gordon R. Sullivan (Acting)

United States Under Secretary of the Army
- In office August 14, 1989 – November 23, 1993
- President: George H. W. Bush
- Preceded by: Michael P. W. Stone
- Succeeded by: Joe R. Reeder

Personal details
- Born: September 13, 1933 Louisville, Kentucky, U.S.
- Died: March 17, 2017 (aged 83) Clinton, Maryland, U.S.
- Spouse: Jean Shannon
- Children: John Shannon Jr.
- Education: Central State University (BS); Shippensburg University (MS)

Military service
- Allegiance: United States
- Branch/service: United States Army
- Rank: Colonel

John William Shannon Sr. (September 13, 1933 – March 17, 2017) was United States Under Secretary of the Army from 1989 to 1993.

== Biography ==
Shannon was born in Louisville, Kentucky, on September 13, 1933. He was educated at Central State College, graduating in 1955 with a B.S. in industrial education.

After college, Shannon was commissioned as a second lieutenant in the Infantry of the United States Army. In the Army, he served as a commander and staff officer. During the Vietnam War, he served two tours of duty in South Vietnam as a military advisor and battalion commander. From 1972 to 1974, he served as a congressional liaison officer in the Office of the Secretary of the Army. He received an M.S. in public administration from Shippensburg State College in 1975. He retired from the United States Army in 1978, having attained the rank of colonel.

Upon leaving the Army, Shannon became Special Assistant for Manpower, Reserve Affairs and Logistics to the Assistant Secretary of Defense for Legislative Affairs. From June 1981 to December 1984, he was Deputy Under Secretary of the Army.

In 1984, President of the United States Ronald Reagan nominated Shannon as Assistant Secretary of the Army (Installations and Logistics) and he subsequently held this office from December 7, 1984, to 13 August 1989.

In 1989, President George H. W. Bush nominated Shannon as United States Under Secretary of the Army and he subsequently held this office from August 14, 1989, until November 23, 1993. He was Acting United States Secretary of the Army from January 20, 1993, until August 26, 1993. On that date, Shannon was arrested outside the Ft. Myer post exchange in Arlington, Va. after store detectives saw him put items worth about $30 into a shopping bag and leave the store without paying. Shannon was placed on administrative leave, and never returned to his position.

The charges against Shannon were dismissed after he agreed to attend a shoplifting prevention program and perform community service. He was subsequently hired as a month-to-month contracted consultant by the Deputy Undersecretary of Defense for Logistics to study inventories and advise the military on which parts and supplies to keep on hand in what quantities. He completed his study and ended his contract in early 1994.

Shannon later operated his own firm, Shannon Consulting Services.

After his death at Southern Maryland Hospital, Shannon was interred along with his wife Jean R. (Miller) Shannon (June 17, 1933 – March 16, 2017) at Arlington National Cemetery on September 28, 2017.

Government offices
Preceded by Michael P. W. Stone	United States Under Secretary of the Army; 1983–1993	Succeeded by Joe R. Reeder
Preceded by Michael P. W. Stone	United States Secretary of the Army; Acting; 1993	Succeeded by Gordon R. Sullivan; Acting
