= Francis Edward Hyland =

American prelate (1901–1968)

His Excellency, The Most Reverend Francis Edward Hyland
- Bishop of Atlanta; Titular Bishop of Gomphi
- Church: Roman Catholic Church
- See: Atlanta
- In office: July 17, 1956—October 11, 1961
- Predecessor: none
- Successor: Paul John Hallinan
- Previous post: Auxiliary Bishop of Savannah-Atlanta (1949-1956)

Orders
- Ordination: June 11, 1927 by Michael Joseph Crane
- Consecration: December 21, 1949 by Dennis Joseph Dougherty

Personal details
- Born: October 9, 1901 Philadelphia, Pennsylvania
- Died: January 31, 1968 (aged 66) Philadelphia, Pennsylvania
- Education: Catholic University of America
- Motto: Ad Jesum rer Mariam (To Jesus through Mary)
- Coat of arms

Francis Edward Hyland (October 9, 1901 – January 31, 1968) was an American prelate of the Roman Catholic Church. He served as bishop of the Diocese of Atlanta in Georgia from 1956 to 1961. He previously served as an auxiliary bishop of the Diocese of Savannah-Atlanta in Georgia from 1949 to 1956.

== Biography ==
=== Early life ===
Francis Hyland was born on October 9, 1901, in Philadelphia, Pennsylvania, to James and Sarah (née McCarron) Hyland. He attended the Roman Catholic High School for Boys in Philadelphia. Deciding to become a priest, Hyland entered St. Charles Borromeo Seminary in Wynnewood, Pennsylvania.

=== Priesthood ===
Hyland was ordained to the priesthood for the Archdiocese of Philadelphia by Bishop Michael Crane on June 11, 1927. He earned a doctorate in canon law from the Catholic University of America in Washington, D.C., in 1928, then spent ten years as secretary to the apostolic delegation in Washington, Returning to Pennsylvania, Hyland served as pastor of Resurrection Parish in Chester and of Our Lady of Lourdes Parish in Philadelphia (1941–1949).

=== Auxiliary Bishop of Savannah-Atlanta ===
On October 15, 1949, Hyland was appointed auxiliary bishop of Savannah-Atlanta and titular bishop of Gomphi by Pope Pius XII. He received his episcopal consecration on December 21, 1949, from Cardinal Dennis Dougherty, with Bishops Hugh L. Lamb and J. Carroll McCormick serving as co-consecrators, at the Cathedral of Saints Peter and Paul in Philadelphia. Hyland selected as his episcopal motto: "Ad Jesum Per Mariam" (Latin: "To Jesus through Mary").

=== Bishop of Atlanta ===
Hyland was named the first bishop of the recently erected Diocese of Atlanta by Pius XII on July 17, 1956. He was installed at the Cathedral of Christ the King in Atlanta, Georgia, on November 8, 1956.

=== Retirement and legacy ===
After a five-year-long tenure, Hyland resigned as bishop of Atlanta due to ill health on October 11, 1961; upon accepting his resignation, Pope John XXIII appointed him titular bishop of Bisica.Francis Hyland died in Philadelphia on January 31, 1968, at age 66.

Catholic Church titles
Preceded by none	Bishop of Atlanta; 1956–1961	Succeeded by Paul John Hallinan
Preceded by –	Auxiliary Bishop of Savannah-Atlanta; 1949–1956	Succeeded by –
