= Notre Dame Academy (Georgia) =

Coordinates: 34.0157°N 84.1747°W

Notre Dame Academy is a Pre-K through 12 Catholic school in Duluth, Georgia. It is operated independently from the Roman Catholic Archdiocese of Atlanta.

It was established in 2005. Previously it was a PK–8 school. The groundbreaking for the high school building, on a 21-acre (8.5 ha) plot, occurred in 2014. High school classes began in fall 2015.

Another private school that focused on students with learning disabilities, Sophia Academy, merged into Notre Dame, effective August 2017. The previous Sophia Academy campus closed, with operations moved to Notre Dame.

== Campus ==
The high school building has twelve classrooms. There are also dedicated buildings for fine arts classes and a gymnasium.

== Student body ==
As of 2019 the school had 460 students, with about two thirds being Catholic and about 50 total receiving special attention due to having learning disabilities.
