= Howard School (Warrensburg, Missouri) =

- U.S. National Register of Historic Places
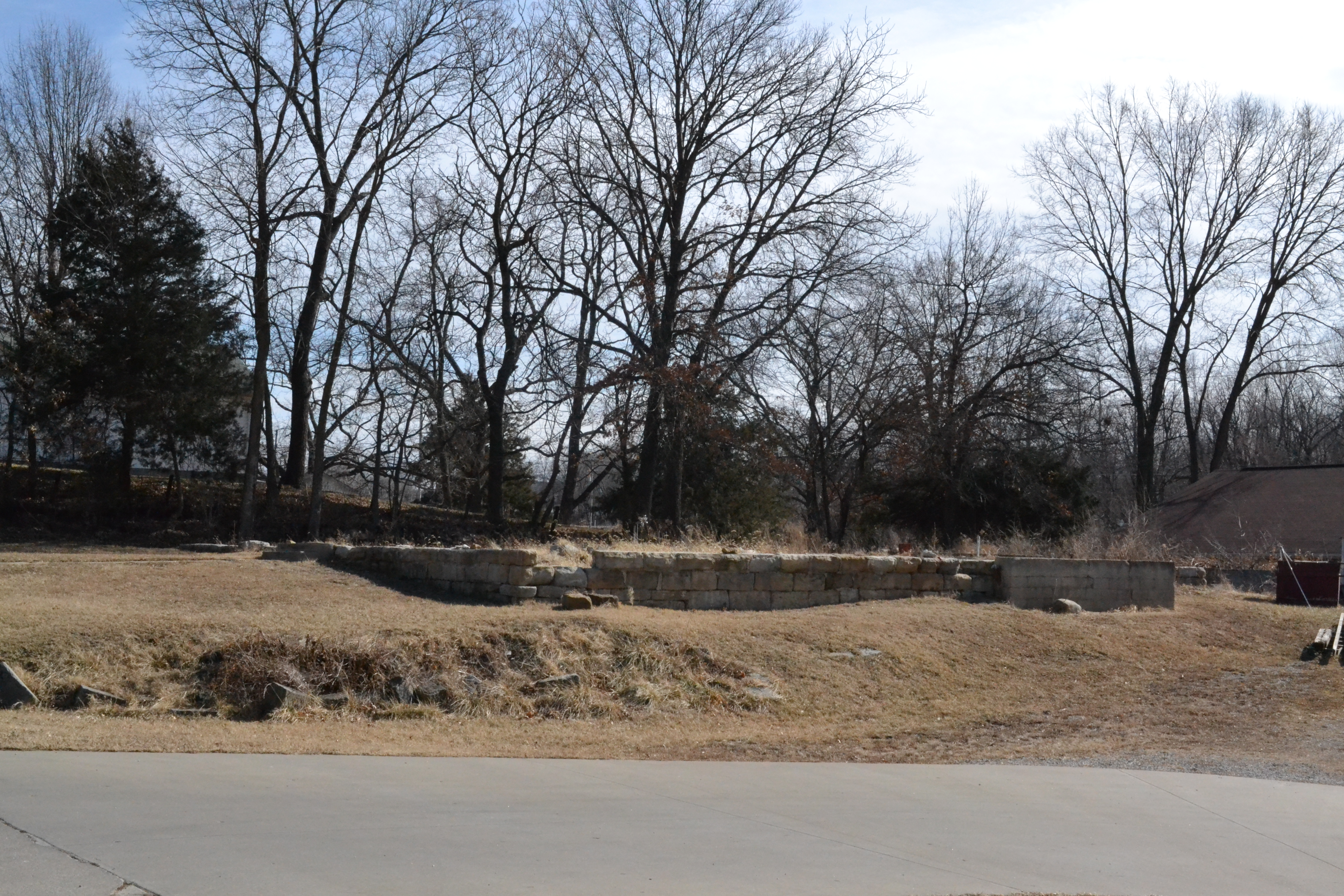
- The remnants of the Howard School in 2018

- Location within Missouri Location within the United States
- Location: 400 W. Culton St., Warrensburg, Missouri
- Coordinates: 38°45′51″N 93°43′32″W
- Area: less than one acre
- Architect: Newcomer, John; Lowe, William
- Architectural style: Late Victorian, three room T-shaped
- NRHP reference No.: 02000046
- Added to NRHP: February 14, 2002

The Howard School was built in 1888. It was closed in 1955. The building sat on Culton Street in Warrensburg, Missouri. The school was officially entered in the National Register of Historic Places on February 14, 2002.

== History ==
The Howard School had its beginning in 1867, when Cynthia Ann Reed Briggs and the Rev. M. Henry Smith from the American Missionary Association purchased a Lot 14 in Rentch's Addition in Warrensburg for the sum of $100.23. Funding for this lot and subsequent school building was accomplished with African American assistance alone. The new one-room, 32'x24' frame building cost $1,001.90 and when half-completed, accepted assistance from the Freedmen's Bureau in the amount of $800 to finish the structure. Grateful for the assistance, the school's sponsors decided to call it Howard School, in honor of General Oliver O. Howard, Commissioner of the Freedmen's Bureau. The Howard School was the newly established Warrensburg School District's first school building, opening in August, 1867. Rev. M. Henry Smith was named by the School Board to take charge of the city's black schools and served as principal and teacher in the school. In 1871, Smith resigned his post to become the first President of Lincoln Institute in Jefferson City, Missouri's first African American institution of higher learning.

The current building came into existence as a result of the success of the first Howard School. Attendance grew from an average daily attendance of 45 black students in 1867 to well over 100 students by 1870. After renting space in several buildings on the west side of town to help accommodate the exploding black student population, and prodding from the black community and a few vocal citizens, the Board of Education, on May 21, 1888, approved plans for the construction of a new school building consisting of three rooms, each the size of the first school building (32'x24'), to provide for the educational needs of Warrensburg's black school children. The cost to the district was $1605. As more students successfully completed instruction in lower grades, demands for more advanced coursework increased. Two years of high school courses were added initially. In 1929, the eleventh grade was added, followed by the twelfth grade a little later. In May 1932, Lillian Inez Visor became the first student to receive a diploma for the four-year high school program. When the State Department of Education adopted new requirements for the accreditation and classification of school in 1948, Howard School could not meet the new higher standards. After failing twice to secure approval for a bond issue that would have upgraded the Howard School, The Warrensburg School Board voted to discontinue the school's high school program. They agreed to transport any qualified African-American high school student to CC Hubbard High School located 28 miles to the east in Sedalia. The school continued solely as a grade school until its closing in 1955 as a result of the integration of schools in America.

== Restoration ==
The Howard School Preservation Association has developed a mission statement, filed Articles of Incorporation with the state of Missouri, and has been designated as a 501(c)(3) tax-exempt not-for-profit organization by the IRS (September 16, 2003). In addition, an Assessment and Feasibility Study was completed in July 2004 which provides a preservation plan that includes an analysis of the building and recommendations for restoration as well as long term maintenance. The Howard School Preservation Association was officially deeded the property on which the Howard School building is located on December 22, 2004. The Howard School building roof collapsed in the summer of 2014, and the building was subsequently demolished in 2015.
