= Bernard Shlesinger =

American bishop of the Catholic Church (born 1960)

His Excellency, The Most Reverend Bernard Edward Shlesinger
- Auxiliary Bishop of Atlanta
- Archdiocese: Atlanta
- Appointed: May 15, 2017
- Installed: July 19, 2017

Orders
- Ordination: June 22, 1996 by Francis Joseph Gossman
- Consecration: July 19, 2017 by Wilton Daniel Gregory, Luis R. Zarama, and Michael Francis Burbidge

Personal details
- Born: December 17, 1960 (age 65) Washington, D.C., US
- Education: Virginia Tech; Catholic University of America; Pontifical North American College; Pontifical University of St. Thomas Aquinas
- Motto: Christum oportet crescere (Christ must grow)

Styles of Bernard Edward Shlesinger
- Reference style: His Excellency; The Most Reverend
- Spoken style: Your Excellency
- Religious style: Bishop

Bernard Edward "Ned" Shlesinger III (born December 17, 1960) is an American Catholic prelate who has served as an auxiliary bishop for the Archdiocese of Atlanta in Georgia since 2017.

== Biography ==
=== Early life ===
Bernard Shlesinger III was born on December 17, 1960, in Washington, D.C. to Bernard E. “Bill” Shlesinger Jr. and Rita Belmont Shlesinger. Bill Shlesinger was an inventor and attorney. Bernard Shlesinger has two brothers and three sisters.

Shlesinger attended Mount Vernon High School in Alexandria, Virginia, then entered Virginia Polytechnic Institute and State University (VPI) also known as Virginia Tech (VT) in Blacksburg, Virginia, with plans to become a farmer. While at Virginia Tech, he started pilot training through the college.

After receiving a Bachelor of Science degree in agricultural engineering in 1983, Shlesinger entered the US Air Force as a commissioned officer. As a pilot, he flew Lockheed C-130E Hercules air transport planes out of Pope Field in Fayetteville, North Carolina. While in the Air Force, he started serving as a catechist for Reverend Richard Higgins, then a military chaplain.

In 1990, Shlesinger retired from the Air Force with the rank of captain and started studying for the priesthood. He first studied philosophy at the Theological College of Catholic University of America in Washington, D.C. Shlesinger then went to Rome to reside at the Pontifical North American College while studying there. Shlesinger was awarded a Bachelor of Theology degree from the Pontifical Gregorian University in Rome in 1995. He then studied for a Licentiate in Sacred Theology from the Pontifical University of St. Thomas Aquinas in Rome.

=== Priesthood ===
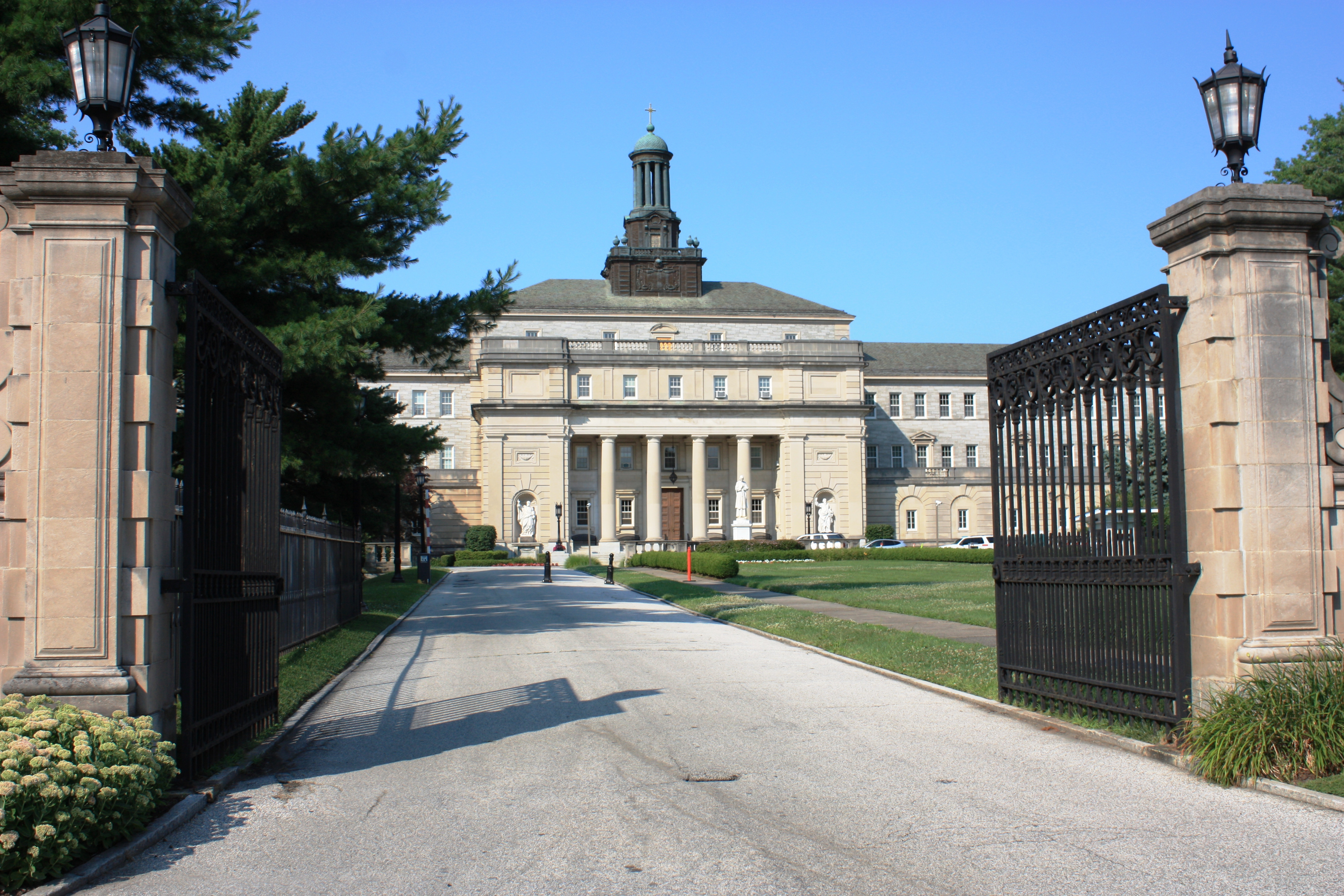
St. Charles Borromeo Seminary, Wynnewood, Pennsylvania (2012)

After returning to North Carolina, Shlesinger was ordained a priest on June 22, 1996, by Bishop Francis Gossman at St. Mark Church in Wilmington, North Carolina, for the Diocese of Raleigh. After Shlesinger's ordination, the diocese assigned him that same year as parochial vicar at St. Mary Parish in Wilmington. Two years later, in 1998, the diocese appointed him as pastor of Our Lady of Guadalupe Parish in Newton Grove, North Carolina, along with the position of assistant director of vocations for the diocese.

In 2007, the diocese moved Shlesinger out of Our Lady of Guadalupe to become the director of vocations and seminarian formation. Between 2010 and 2012, he also served as the diocesan administrator of Maria, Reina de las Americas Parish in Mount Olive, North Carolina.

In 2013, Shlesinger left Raleigh to become director of spiritual formation at St. Charles Borromeo Seminary in Wynnewood, Pennsylvania.

=== Auxiliary Bishop of Atlanta ===
On May 15, 2017, Pope Francis appointed Shlesinger as auxiliary bishop of the Archdiocese of Atlanta. He was consecrated by Cardinal Wilton Gregory at the Cathedral of Christ the King in Atlanta on July 19, 2017, with Bishops Michael Francis Burbidge and Luis Rafael Zarama Pasqualetto serving as co-consecrators.

As an auxiliary bishop, Shlesinger is responsible for Region II of the archdiocese.

== Coat of arms ==
Based on the arms of Shlesinger's home diocese of Raleigh, North Carolina, by reversing the color to be red on silver (white), is a cross of the faith that is composed of eight diamonds (heraldically called “lozenges”). Upon these lozenges is a gold escutcheon (small shield within the major shield) that is charged with the symbolism of the Sacred Heart. To the lower right, base sinister, is a blue “M,” of the Virgin Mary, taken from the arms of Pope John Paul II.

== See also ==
- Catholic Church hierarchy
- Catholic Church in the United States
- Historical list of the Catholic bishops of the United States
- List of Catholic bishops of the United States
- Lists of patriarchs, archbishops, and bishops

Catholic Church titles
Preceded by –	Auxiliary Bishop of Atlanta; 2017–Present	Succeeded by –
