= Howard School (Atlanta) =

The Howard School

Location
- 1192 Foster Street, NW; Atlanta, Georgia 30318; United States
- Coordinates: 33.787131°N 84.416833°W

Information
- School type: Special education
- Motto: "A Different Approach Makes All the Difference"
- Founded: 1950
- Founder: Marian Howard
- Head of school: Dr. Anna Moore
- Teaching staff: 53
- Grades: PK–12
- Student to teacher ratio: 8
- Hours in school day: 6
- Campus size: 16 acres (6.5 ha)
- Campus type: Urban
- Mascot: Howie the Hawk
- Team name: Hawks
- Accreditation: Southern Association of Colleges and Schools/AdvancED, Southern Association of Independent Schools
- Tuition: Age 5 through grade 12: tuition ranges from $39,590 - $43,810
- Website: howardschool.org

The Howard School is a school in Atlanta, Georgia, for K–12 students with language-based learning disabilities and learning differences.

== History ==
The school was founded in 1950 by Marion Howard. In 2016, the school had 270 students. The current head of the school is Anna Moore.

== Accreditation ==
The Howard School is accredited by the Southern Association of Colleges and Schools (SACS) and the Southern Association of Independent Schools (SAIS). The school is affiliated with the National Association of Independent Schools, the Southern Association of Independent Schools, and the Georgia Independent School Association.
