= Archdiocese of Atlanta =

Catholic ecclesiastical territory

Archdiocese of Atlanta Archdiœcesis Atlantensis
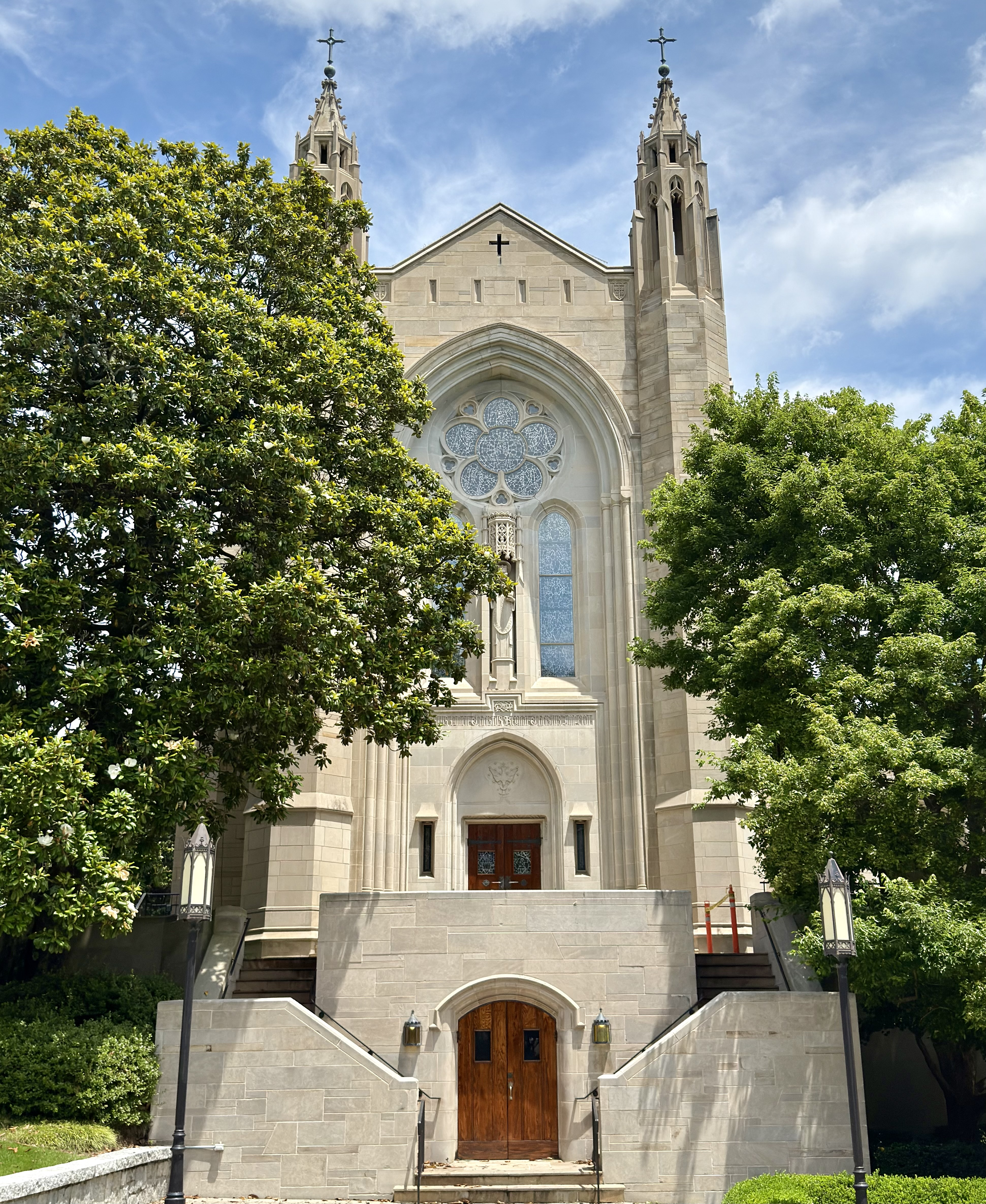
- Cathedral of Christ the King in Atlanta

- Coat of arms

Location
- Country: United States
- Territory: (Georgia (U.S. state)) 69 counties in northern Georgia
- Ecclesiastical province: Province of Atlanta
- Coordinates: 33°46′23″N 84°23′15″W

Statistics
- Area: 55,521 km^{2} (21,437 sq mi)
- Population: Total; Catholics: (as of 2020); 7,500,000; 1,200,000 (16.0%)
- Parishes: 102
- Schools: 18

Information
- Denomination: Catholic
- Sui iuris church: Latin Church
- Rite: Roman Rite
- Established: July 2, 1956; 70 years ago
- Cathedral: Cathedral of Christ the King
- Patron saint: Immaculate Heart of Mary; Pope Pius X

Current leadership
- Pope: Leo XIV
- Archbishop: Gregory John Hartmayer, O.F.M. Conv.
- Auxiliary Bishops: Joel Matthias Konzen; Bernard Shlesinger; John Nhàn Trần

Map
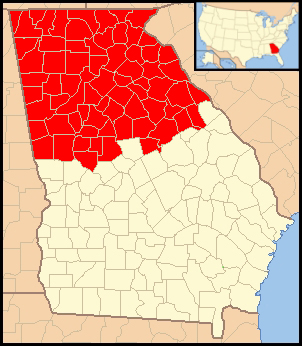

Website
- archatl.com

The Archdiocese of Atlanta (Latin: Archdiœcesis Atlantensis) is an archdiocese of the Catholic Church in northern Georgia in the United States. The archdiocese is led by a prelate archbishop, who also serves as pastor of the mother church, the Cathedral of Christ the King in Atlanta. The archbishop is Gregory Hartmayer.

== Territory ==
The Archdiocese of Atlanta covers 69 counties in northern Georgia. The cathedral is the metropolitan see of the Catholic Ecclesiastical Province of Atlanta, which covers Georgia, South Carolina, and North Carolina. It includes the following suffragan dioceses:

- Diocese of Savannah
- Diocese of Charleston
- Diocese of Raleigh
- Diocese of Charlotte

In 2020, the archdiocese included 102 parishes and missions with 1,200,000 registered Catholics.

== History ==
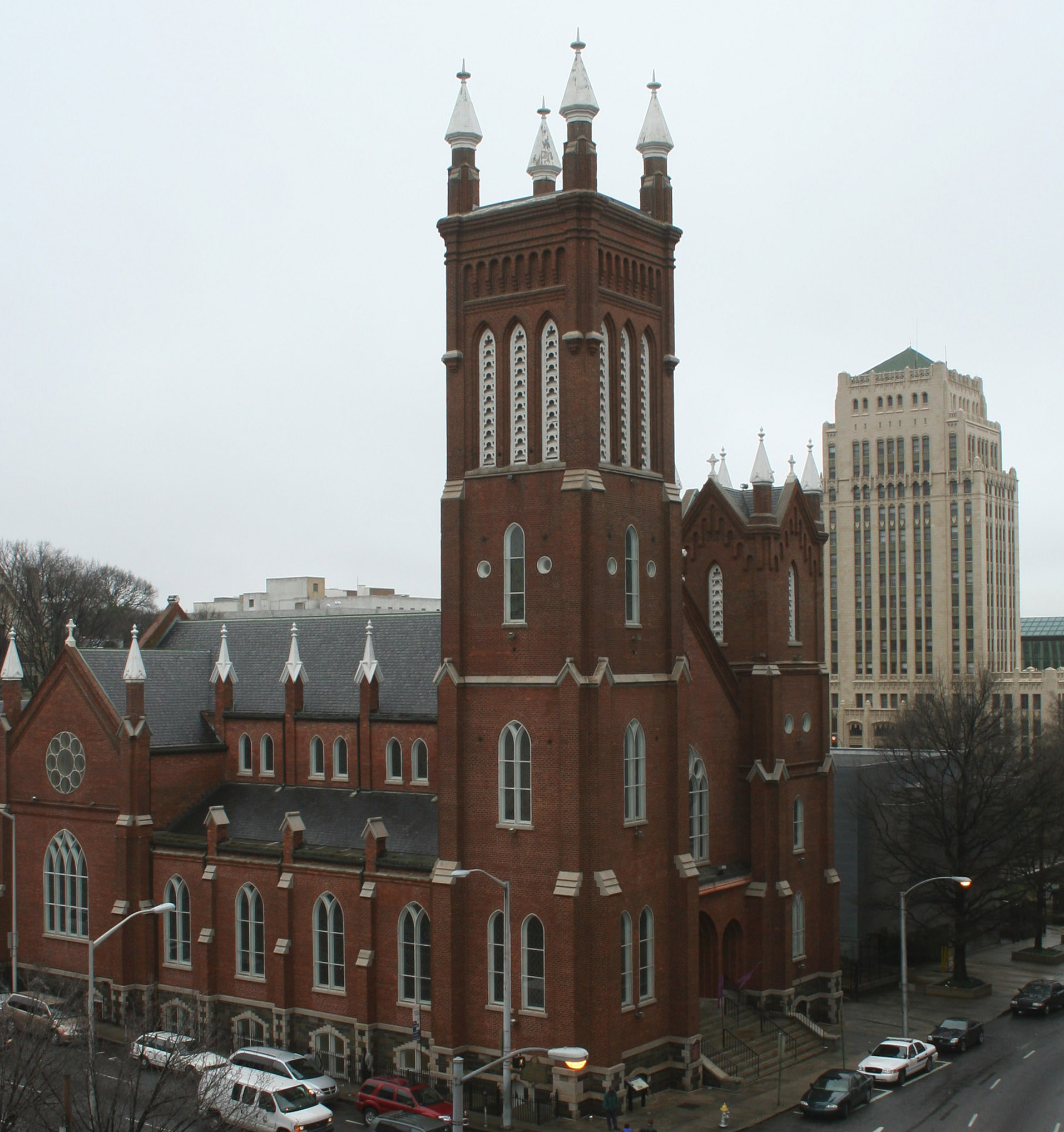
Shrine of the Immaculate Conception, Atlanta, Georgia (2011)

=== 1776 to 1850 ===
In 1732, present-day Georgia became a British colony. Like most of the American colonies, the British Province of Georgia banned Catholic worship. The leaders of the colony feared Catholic Spain, which had established colonies next to Georgia in Florida. As a result, there was no Catholic community in the province at this time.

The American Revolution changed attitudes towards Catholics in Georgia. The new State of Georgia amended its constitution in 1777 to reduce restrictions on Catholics. During the siege of Savannah by the British in 1779, over 3,900 Catholic French, Haitian, and Irish troops fought with the Georgians. After the American Revolution ended in 1783, the British gave up control of the colonies. The new US Constitution ensured religious freedom for all Americans, including Catholics.

The Vatican in 1784 created the Prefecture Apostolic of the United States, removing the small population of American Catholics from the jurisdiction of the church hierarchy in Great Britain.Five years later, in 1789, the Vatican converted the prefecture into the Diocese of Baltimore, with jurisdiction over the entire United States.

The first Catholic presence in north Georgia was a small group of English Catholics from Maryland.They built the Church of the Purification of the Blessed Virgin Mary in Crawfordville, the first Catholic church in the state.In Augusta, the first parish was Most Holy Trinity, founded in 1810. Its church, dedicated in 1857, is the oldest surviving Catholic church in the state.

The Vatican erected the Diocese of Charleston in 1820, covering Georgia, North Carolina and South Carolina. The first Catholic church in Atlanta, Immaculate Conception, was dedicated in 1848.

=== 1850 to 1956 ===
The Vatican in 1850 established the Diocese of Savannah, with jurisdiction over Georgia and most of Florida. By the start of the American Civil War in 1861, there were approximately 4,000 Catholics in Georgia. In 1864, General William T. Sherman entered Atlanta with the Union Army. His military campaign had been characterized by the burning of towns along his advance through Georgia. Thomas O’Reilly, pastor of Immaculate Conception Church in Atlanta, met with Sherman and convinced him to spare not only his church, but four Protestant churches as well.

St. Joseph's Parish opened in Athens in 1873, the first in that city. In 1876, the diocese opened the St. Joseph's Home for orphaned boys in Washington, Georgia.

In 1880, the Sisters of Mercy opened the Catholic Infirmary in Atlanta, the first hospital in that city. It is today Emory Saint Joseph's Hospital. The first Catholic mission in Marietta was St. Joseph, founded in 1906.That same year, St. Mary's Hospital opened in Athens in 1908. It was taken over in 1938 by the Congregation of the Missionary Sisters of the Sacred Heart. Today it is Saint Mary's Health Care System.

In 1937, recognizing the economic and population growth of Atlanta, Pope Pius XI renamed the Diocese of Savannah as the Diocese of Savannah-Atlanta.

=== 1956 to 1963 ===
On July 2, 1956, Pope Pius XII erected the Diocese of Atlanta, taking northern Georgia from what now became the Diocese of Savannah . The pope designated the Co-Cathedral of Christ the King in Atlanta as the cathedral church of the new diocese and named Auxiliary Bishop Francis Hyland of Savannah-Atlanta as the first bishop. Hyland retired in 1961 due to poor health.

On February 10, 1962, Pope John XXIII elevated the Diocese of Atlanta to the Archdiocese of Atlanta. He designated the Dioceses of Savannah, Charleston and Raleigh, along with the Territorial Abbey of Mary Help of Christians in North Carolina, as its suffragans The pope named Bishop Paul Hallinan of Charleston as the first archbishop of Atlanta.

=== 1963 to 1988 ===
Hallinan's first act as archbishop was to order the racial integration of all Catholic institutions under his jurisdiction. In 1965, he sent priests and nuns to Alabama to participate in the Selma to Montgomery marches with the Southern Christian Leadership Conference. Hallian encouraged Atlanta Catholics to open their neighborhoods "so Negroes can exercise the right of every American to live where he wishes."

During his six years as archbishop, Hallinan opened several churches and missions, as well as the John Lancaster Spalding Catholic Center at the University of Georgia. He moved St. Joseph's Boys Home from Washington, Georgia, to Atlanta and renamed it the Village of St. Joseph, for both boys and girls. He also established The Georgia Bulletin, the weekly archdiocesan newspaper. Hallinan died in 1968.

The second archbishop of Atlanta was Thomas Donnellan from the Diocese of Ogdensburg, named by Pope Paul VI in 1968. During Donnellan's 19-year tenure, the number of Catholics in north Georgia rose from 50,000 in 1968 to over 133,000 by 1987. In 1970, Donnellan barred new enrollments in the archdiocese's Catholic schools. At that time, many parents were pulling their children out of local public school systems due to opposition to racial desegregation and attempting to place them in Catholic schools.. In 1971, Paul VI erected the Diocese of Charlotte, making it another suffragan diocese of Atlanta. Six years later, Paul VI removed the suffragan status of the Territorial Abbey of Mary Help of Christian. These actions established the present configuration of the Metropolitan Province of Atlanta. Donnellan died in 1987.

=== 1988 to 2010 ===
In 1988, Pope John Paul II named Auxiliary Bishop Eugene Marino of the Archdiocese of Washington as archbishop of Atlanta, the first African-American Catholic archbishop. However, in August 1990, Vickie Long, a lay minister in the archdiocese, stated that she and Marino were married and had been in a sexual relationship for the previous two years. The Vatican forced Marino to resign as archbishop in July 1990.

To replace Marino, John Paul II named Auxiliary Bishop James Lyke of the Diocese of Cleveland in 1991 as the next archbishop of Atlanta. However, Lyke died in 1992. The pope then selected Bishop John Donoghue from the Diocese of Charlotte to serve as archbishop. On taking office, Donoghue started building more schools to accommodate the growing population of the archdiocese. He also provided more Spanish-speaking priests for the increased Hispanic population.

The archdiocese in September 2003 sued the Capilla de la Fe (Chapel of the Faith) network of churches in Atlanta to bar them from claiming to be Catholic. The archdiocese said the Capilla de la Fe churches were duping new Hispanic immigrants into thinking they were attending an archdiocesan church. A judge in October 2003 permanently banned Capilla de la Fe from calling itself Catholic. In 2003, Kenneth Joseph Cassity, a youth worker at the Church of St. Ann in Marietta, pleaded guilty to fondling two young brothers between 1999 and 2000 at the church rectory. He was sentenced to three years in prison. The archdiocese settled a lawsuit brought by the boys' parents in 2003 for $10 million.

In April 2004, Donoghue sent an edict to the priests in the archdiocese forbidding women from performing the traditional foot washing ceremony on Holy Thursday. When Donoghue retired as archbishop of Atlanta in 2004, John Paul II appointed Bishop Wilton Gregory from the Diocese of Belleville to replace him. In 2009, Pope Benedict XVI named Luis Zarama as the second auxiliary bishop of Atlanta.

=== 2010 to 2015 ===
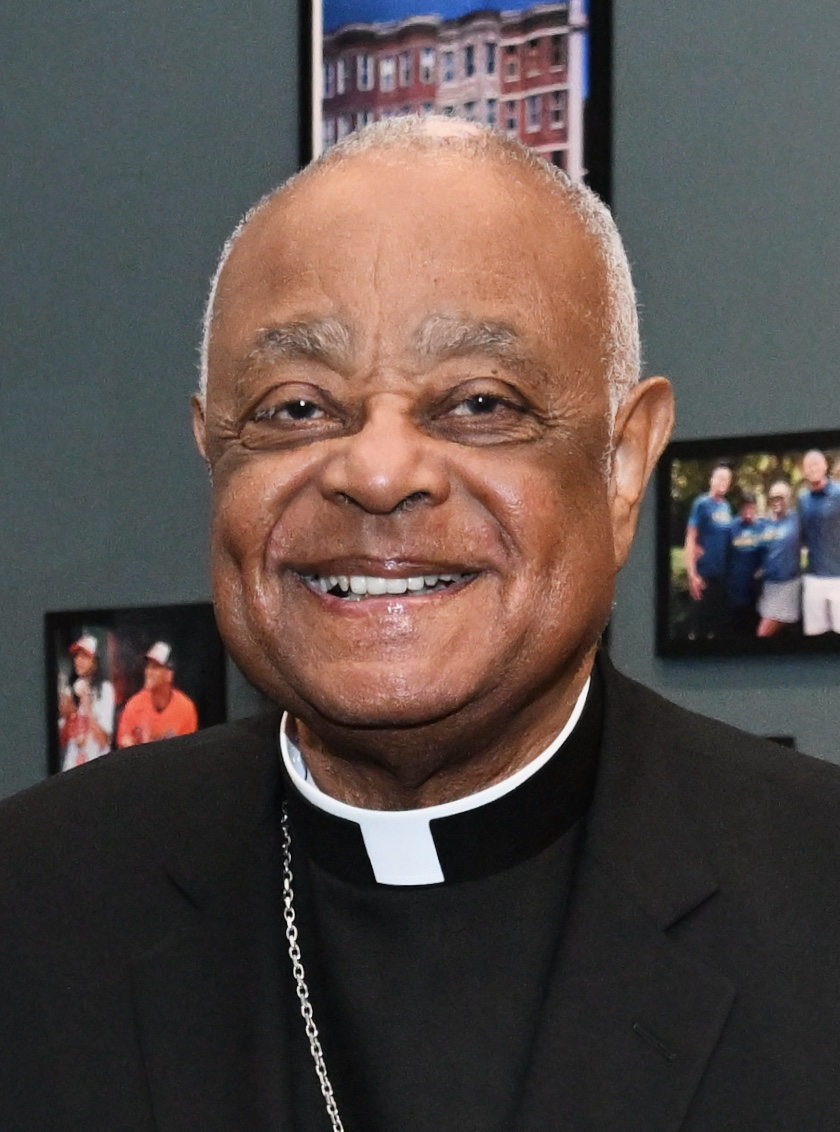
Cardinal Gregory (2024)

In 2010, the archdiocese reported that the population of Catholics in the archdiocese had grown from 30,840 in 1960 to 292,300 in 1998 to 900,000 in 2010. The increase was fueled by Catholics moving to Atlanta from other states and nations, and from conversions to Catholicism. About 11 percent of all metropolitan Atlanta residents were Catholic.

The archdiocese in 2011 received half of the literary rights to the 1939 novel Gone With the Wind. The donor was the estate of Joseph Mitchell, the nephew of author Margaret Mitchell. The novel and its film version had been criticized in recent years for their depiction of African-Americans. In 2013, Monsignor David Talley was installed as an auxiliary bishop of Atlanta.

In 2014, Gregory was criticized after the archdiocese used $2.2 million from a bequest to build a new archbishop's residence in the Buckhead section of Atlanta. The residence was also designed to serve as a banquet and conference facility. (Note: The Atlanta Archdiocese had received a $15 million bequest from the estate of Joseph Mitchell, a nephew of Gone with the Wind author Margaret Mitchell.) Gregory apologized and announced that the archdiocese would sell the residence, although he had moved into it only three months earlier. Later in 2014, the archdiocese sold the Buckhead property for $2.6 million and Gregory moved into a more modest home, purchased for $440,000, in Smyrna.

=== 2015 to present ===
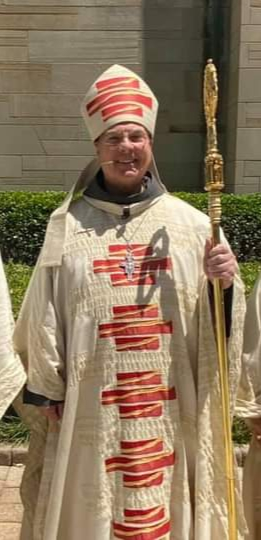
Archbishop Hartmayer (2022)

In 2018, a group of Catholics petitioned Gregory to remove the so-called "pro-LGBT" priest Henry Gracz of the Shrine of the Immaculate Conception in Atlanta from his position as a spiritual advisor to victims of sexual abuse, accusing Gracz of contravening Catholic teaching. Gregory declined the petition. In November 2018, the archdiocese released a list of 15 clergy with credible accusations of sexual abuse of minors since 1956. A second report in 2023 listed 25. An appeals court in Georgia dismissed a lawusit by several alleged victims of sexual abuse against the archdiocese, saying that the statute of limitations for the filings had expired.

In 2019, Gregory became archbishop of the Archdiocese of Washington.Pope Francis appointed Bishop Gregory Hartmayer from Savannah as the next archbishop of Atlanta in 2020.

In February 2023, Hartmayer dedicated a new eucharistic chapel in Hartsfield-Jackson Atlanta International Airport. It was created as an interfaith chapel open to all faith groups.

Hartmayer in October 2024 called for Catholics in the archdiocese to pray in response to a planned black mass by the Satanic Temple Atlanta in the Atlanta area. He claimed that satanists in other areas had stolen consecrated host for use in their service.In a statement, the temple denied that it had stolen any eucharist or planned to use any during the black mass.

Auxiliary bishop John Nhan Tran in January 2026 dedicated CommonSpirit – Memorial Hospital – North Georgia, a new Catholic hospital in Ringgold.

== Bishops ==
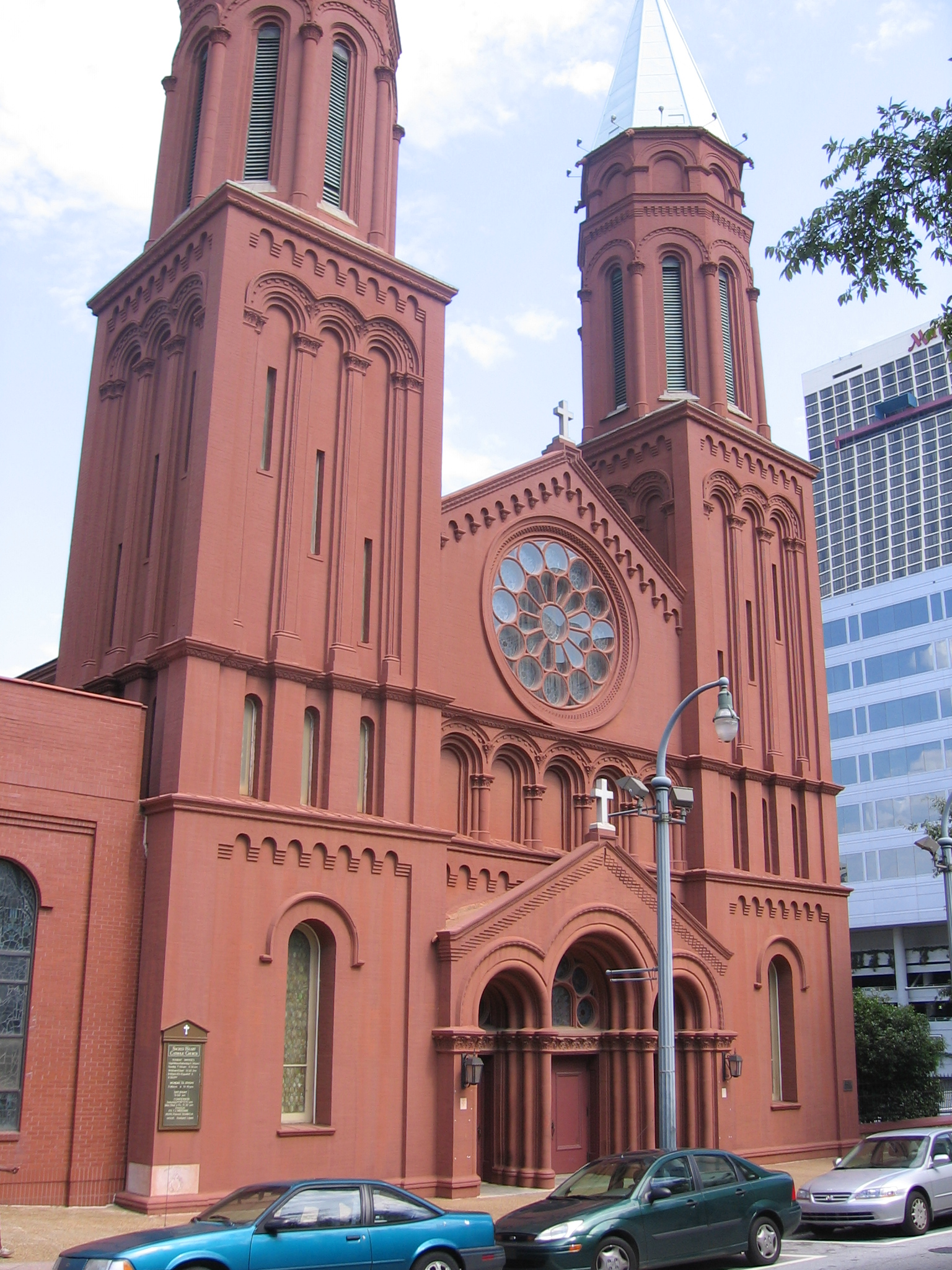
Sacred Heart Basilica, Atlanta, Georgia (2007)

=== Bishop of Atlanta ===
Francis Edward Hyland (1956–1961)

=== Archbishops of Atlanta ===
1. Paul John Hallinan (1962–1968)
2. Thomas Andrew Donnellan (1968–1987)
3. Eugene Antonio Marino (1988–1990)
4. James Patterson Lyke (1991–1992), appointed apostolic administrator from 1990 to 1991)
5. John Francis Donoghue (1993–2005)
6. Wilton Daniel Gregory (2005–2019), appointed archbishop of Washington (elevated to cardinal in 2020)
7. Gregory John Hartmayer (2020–present)

=== Auxiliary Bishops of Atlanta ===
- Joseph Bernardin (1966–1968), appointed general secretary of the U.S. Conference of Catholic Bishops; later appointed archbishop of Cincinnati and archbishop of Chicago (elevated to cardinal in 1983)
- Luis Rafael Zarama (2009–2017), appointed bishop of Raleigh
- David Talley (2013–2016), appointed Bishop of Alexandria; later appointed bishop of Memphis in 2019
- Bernard Shlesinger (2017–present)
- Joel Matthias Konzen (2018–present)
- John Nhàn Trần (2023–present)

=== Other archdiocesan priests who became bishops ===
Eusebius J. Beltran (1960–1978), appointed bishop of Tulsa; later appointed archbishop of Oklahoma City in 1993

== Schools ==
As of 2026, the Archdiocese of Atlanta had 17 schools run by the archdiocese with an enrollment of 6,854 student. ,The archdiocese also contained eight independently operated schools and 27 parish pre-schools. The superintendent of the archdiocesan school system was Patty Childs.In April 2026, the archdiocese launched the Sacred Heart Virtual Academy, an online high school.

=== Kindergarten through 12 schools ===
- Holy Spirit Preparatory School – Atlanta and Sandy Springs campuses (independent)
- Notre Dame Academy – Duluth (independent)
- Pinecrest Academy – Cumming (independent)
- St. Mary's Academy — Fayetteville (archdiocesan); formerly Our Lady of Mercy Catholic High School

=== Grade 7 through 12 school ===
- Donovan Catholic School – Athens (independent)
- Marist School – Brookhaven (independent)

=== High schools ===
- Blessed Trinity Catholic High School – Roswell
- Cristo Rey Atlanta Jesuit High School – Atlanta (independent)
- St. Pius X Catholic High School – DeKalb County

== The Georgia Bulletin ==
The Georgia Bulletin, the official newspaper of the archdiocese, was established in 1963. It is published weekly in print and online (except for June, July and August, when it is published monthly).
