= National Catholic Educational Association (US) =

Private, professional educational membership association

- Abbreviation: NCEA
- Formation: July 1904; 122 years ago
- Type: Nonprofit
- Purpose: Development and leadership of Catholic schools
- Headquarters: 200 North Glebe Road, Suite 300, Arlington, VA 22203
- Location: Arlington, Virginia, U.S.
- Region served: United States
- Members: Catholic educators of the U.S.; primarily elementary and secondary school teachers and staff
- President/CEO: Lincoln Snyder
- Website: ncea.org

The National Catholic Educational Association (NCEA) is a private, professional educational membership association. It represents over 150,000 educators in Catholic schools, universities, and religious education programs in the United States. It is the largest private professional education association in the world.

== Description ==
The NCEA focuses on leadership development for superintendents, presidents, principals, pastors, and governing bodies, as well as professional development for teachers. It also serves as a representative for Catholic school education. It represents 150,000 Catholic educators, serving 1.9 million students in Catholic education. The NCEA is a voluntary association of educators and institutions, developing and articulating a national point of view consistent with the United States Conference of Catholic Bishops (USCCB).

== History ==
At the beginning of the 20th century, there were three professional organizations for Catholic educators in the United States: the Education Conference of Catholic Seminary Faculties, founded in 1898; the Association of Catholic Colleges, founded in 1899; and the Parish School Conference, founded in 1902. At a meeting held in St. Louis, Missouri, on July 12–14, 1904, the three groups merged to form the Catholic Educational Association (CEA). In 1927 the word 'national' was added to the organization's name, and in 1929 its headquarters moved to Washington, DC.

In 1931, the Library Section, which had existed since 1922 and was chaired by Reverend Paul J. Foik, became an independent association, the Catholic Library Association.

In 1970, the NCEA began publication of Momentum Magazine, its official journal, which includes editorials, book reviews, short essays, and opinion columns.

In 2016, the NCEA discontinued its departments for seminaries and parish religious education departments, instead focusing on K–12 Catholic organizations in the United States.

== Governance ==
The NCEA's board of directors consists of 15 to 18 members, including three ex officio members. The chair is an American Catholic bishop. The current and past chairs include:

- Archbishop Gregory J. Hartmayer, OFM Conv. (Archdiocese of Atlanta, 2024–current)
- Bishop Gerald F. Kicanas (Diocese of Tucson, 2017–2024)
- Bishop George V. Murry, S.J. (Diocese of Youngstown, 2015–2017)
- Cardinal Blase J. Cupich (Archdiocese of Chicago, 2013–2015)
- Archbishop Wilton Daniel Gregory (Archdiocese of Atlanta, 2007–2013)
- Cardinal Donald Wuerl (Archdiocese of Washington, 2005–2007)

== Activities ==
The NCEA annual convention features breakout sessions for educators and an exposition. It also provides vendor displays on technology, publications, and services. The NCEA hosts other conferences, seminars, workshops, and symposiums throughout the year.

Services offered include in-service programs, religious education assessments, development field services, and award programs recognizing educators and students.

The NCEA provides several awards for individuals and organizations that provide "important contributions to the evangelizing mission of the Catholic Church occurring in Catholic schools." These include several presidential awards: the Youth Virtues, Valor and Vision Awards and the Lead. Learn. Proclaim. Awards.
