= Juan Esposito-Garcia =

Argentine American Catholic bishop (born 1974)

His Excellency, The Most Reverend Juan Esposito-Garcia
- Auxiliary Bishop of Washington
- Archdiocese: Washington
- Appointed: December 19, 2022
- Installed: February 21, 2023
- Other post: Titular Bishop of Tabla
- Previous posts: Official, Dicastery for Bishops; Judge, Metropolitan Tribunal, Archdiocese of Washington; Adjunct Professor of Canon Law, Mount St. Mary's Seminary

Orders
- Ordination: June 14, 2008 by Donald Wuerl
- Consecration: February 21, 2023 by Wilton Daniel Gregory, Mario E. Dorsonville, and Roy Edward Campbell

Personal details
- Born: January 10, 1974 (age 52) San Luis, Argentina
- Education: Catholic University of America; Mount Saint Mary's Seminary; Catholic University of Cuyo
- Motto: Beati pacifici (Blessed are the peaceful)

Styles of Juan Esposito-Garcia
- Reference style: His Excellency; The Most Reverend
- Spoken style: Your Excellency
- Religious style: Bishop

Juan Rafael Esposito-Garcia (born January 10, 1974) is an Argentine American Catholic prelate who serves as auxiliary bishop for the Archdiocese of Washington in the District of Columbia and Southern Maryland.

== Biography ==
=== Early life ===
Esposito-Garcia was born on January 10, 1974, in San Luis, Argentina. He attended the Instituto Santo Tomas de Aquino in San Luis for his primary education from 1980 to 1991. After finishing university, Esposito-Garcia entered the law school of the Universidad Catolica de Cuyo in San Luis, receiving a law degree in 2003.

Having decided to become a priest, Esposito-Garcia immigrated to the United States to attend Mount Saint Mary's Seminary in Emmitsburg, Maryland. He earned a Master of Divinity degree and a Master of Arts in moral theology from the seminary in 2008.

=== Priesthood ===
On June 14, 2008, Esposito-Garcia was ordained to the priesthood at the Basilica of the National Shrine of the Immaculate Conception in Washington by Archbishop Donald Wuerl. After his 2008 ordination, the archdiocese assigned Esposito-Garcia as parochial vicar at the following parishes in Maryland:

- Shrine of St. Jude in Rockville (2008 to 2010)
- St. Mark the Evangelist in Hyattsville (2010 to 2012). In 2011, he earned a Licentiate of Canon Law from the Catholic University of America in Washington.
- Little Flower in Bethesda and Ascension in Bowie (2014). That same year, he was also named adjunct professor of canon law and adjunct spiritual director at Mount Saint Mary's Seminary.

Starting in 2011, Esposito-Garcia served as a judge on the metropolitan tribunal for the archdiocese. In 2016, he was awarded a Doctor of Canon Law degree by Catholic University. By 2017, he had been named judicial vicar. In 2018, Esposito-Garcia traveled to Rome to serve as an official in the Dicastery for Bishops at the Vatican.

=== Auxiliary Bishop of Washington ===
Pope Francis appointed Esposito-Garcia as an auxiliary bishop of Washington on December 19, 2022. On February 21, 2023, Esposito-Garcia was consecrated as a bishop at the Cathedral of St. Matthew the Apostle in Washington by Cardinal Wilton Gregory, with Bishop Mario E. Dorsonville and Auxiliary Bishop Roy Campbell acting as co-consecrators.

Esposito-Garcia speaks English, Spanish, and Italian.

== See also ==
- Catholic Church hierarchy
- Catholic Church in the United States
- Historical list of the Catholic bishops of the United States
- List of Catholic bishops of the United States
- Lists of patriarchs, archbishops, and bishops

== Episcopal succession ==
Catholic Church titles
| Preceded by - | Auxiliary Bishop of Washington; 2023-Present | Succeeded by - |
