= Robert P. Boxie =

American Catholic prelate (born 1980)

His Excellency, The Most Reverend Robert P. Boxie
- Auxiliary Bishop of Washington
- Church: Catholic Church
- Archdiocese: Washington
- Appointed: May 1, 2026
- Installed: July 7, 2026
- Other post: Titular Bishop of Cataquas

Orders
- Ordination: June 25, 2016 by Donald Wuerl
- Consecration: July 7, 2026 by Robert McElroy, Wilton Gregory, and Mark E. Brennan

Personal details
- Born: September 12, 1980 (age 45) Lake Charles, Louisiana, US
- Education: Pontifical Gregorian University; Harvard Law School; Vanderbilt University
- Motto: Domine, da mihi sapientiam (Latin for 'O Lord, give me wisdom')
- Styles
- Reference style: His Excellency; The Most Reverend
- Spoken style: Your Excellency
- Religious style: Bishop

Robert Paul Boxie III (born September 12, 1980) is an American Catholic prelate serving as an auxiliary bishop of the Archdiocese of Washington since 2026. He is the youngest Catholic bishop in the United States.

== Early life and education ==
Boxie was born on September 12, 1980, in Lake Charles, Louisiana. He is the son of Robert P. and Roxanne (née Guillory) Boxie. He has a sister, Robyn. After graduating from St. Louis Catholic High School in 1998, he studied at Vanderbilt University in Nashville, Tennessee, and was a member of Alpha Phi Alpha. He received degrees in chemical engineering and music in 2002.

Upon graduation, Boxie worked abroad for a year in France, teaching English as a language assistant at a high school. After returning to the United States, he studied at Harvard Law School and graduated with a JD in 2007. As an attorney, he served as a law clerk for the United States District Court for the District of Maryland in Greenbelt and then as an associate with the prominent white shoe biglaw firm Vinson & Elkins in Washington, D.C.

Discerning a call to the priesthood, Boxie began his formation at the Theological College of the Catholic University of America. He continued his studies in Rome, residing at the Pontifical North American College while studying at the Pontifical Gregorian University. He received a Bachelor of Sacred Theology (2015) and a Licentiate of Sacred Theology (2017) from the Gregorian.

== Priesthood ==
On June 25, 2016, Boxie was ordained a priest at the Basilica of the National Shrine of the Immaculate Conception for the Archdiocese of Washington by Cardinal Donald Wuerl. After Boxie's ordination, he was made parochial vicar at St. Francis of Assisi Catholic Parish in Derwood, Maryland. The next year, Boxie was transferred to St. Joseph Parish in Largo, Maryland. At St. Joseph, he served under the pastor, Auxiliary Bishop Roy E. Campbell Jr. In 2020, Boxie was appointed as the Catholic chaplain for Howard University in Washington.

In addition to his pastoral duties, Boxie has served as assistant vocations director since 2016 and a professor in the permanent diaconate program since 2018. He is also a member of the board of trustees for the Catholic University of America and a member of the National Black Catholic Clergy Caucus.

== Episcopacy ==
On May 1, 2026, Boxie was appointed as an auxiliary bishop of Washington and titular bishop of Cataquas by Pope Leo XIV.

Boxie was ordained a bishop on July 7, 2026, by Cardinal Robert McElroy at the Basilica of the National Shrine of the Immaculate Conception, with Cardinal Wilton Gregory and Bishop Mark E. Brennan serving as co-consecrators. At 45, Boxie became the youngest Catholic bishop in the United States upon his consecration.

== Episcopal succession ==
Catholic Church titles
| Preceded by - | Auxiliary Bishop of Washington; 2026-present | Succeeded by - |
