= St. Augustine Catholic Church (Washington, D.C.) =

Coordinates: 38.918561°N 77.032895°W

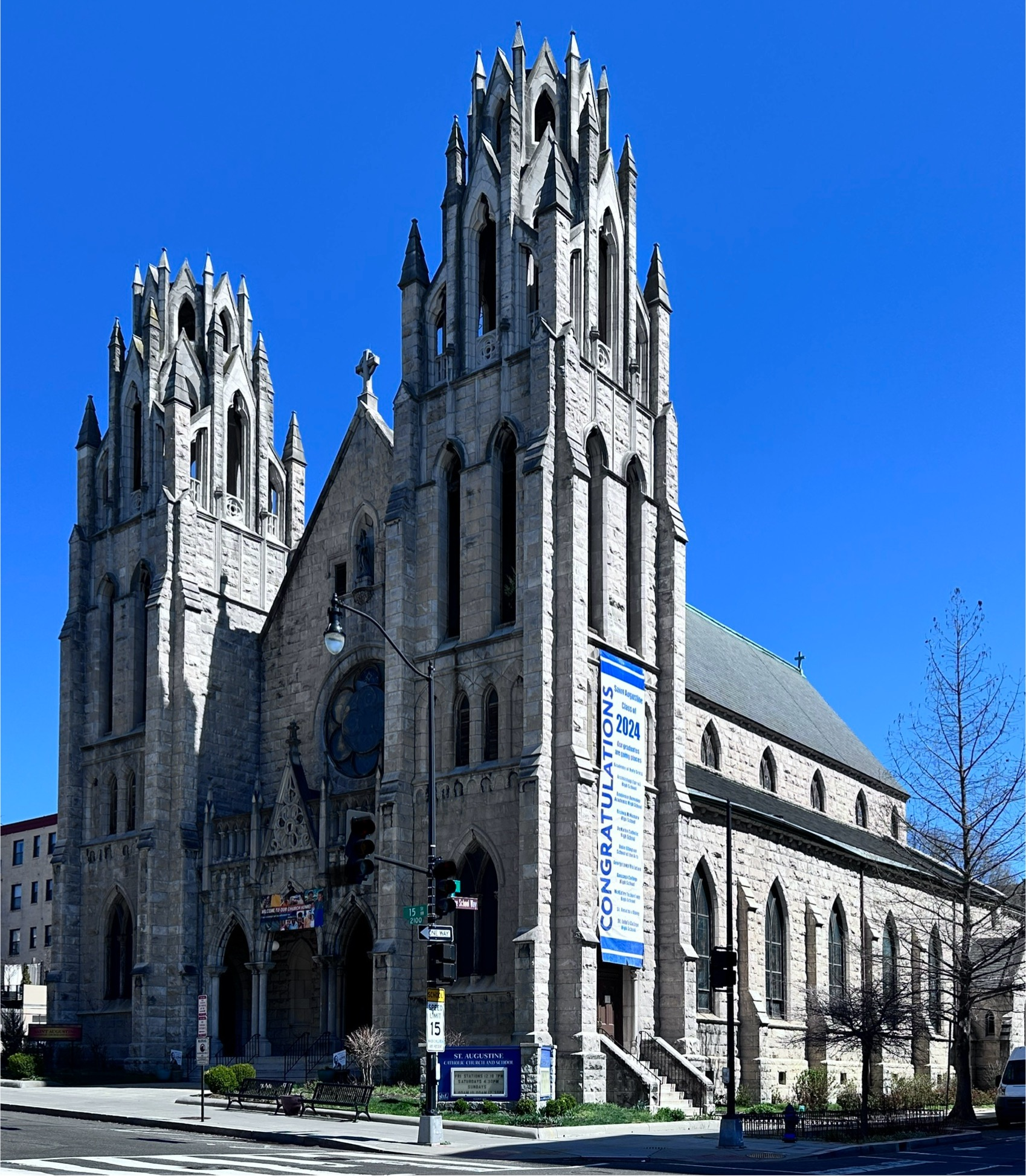
- St. Augustine Catholic Church in 2025
- St. Augustine Catholic Church
- Location: 1419 V St., NW; Washington, DC 20009
- Country: United States
- Denomination: Roman Catholic
- Website: St. Augustine Catholic Church

History
- Founded: 1858
- Dedication: Saint Augustine of Hippo
- Dedicated: 1876

Administration
- Province: Washington
- Archdiocese: Washington

Clergy
- Priest: Fr. Pat A. Smith

St. Augustine Catholic Church (originally St Martin de Porres Catholic Church) is a Catholic parish in Washington, D.C. It is considered by many to be the "Mother Church of Black Catholics", as the first Black parish in the district and the administrator of D.C.'s oldest surviving Black school.

== History ==
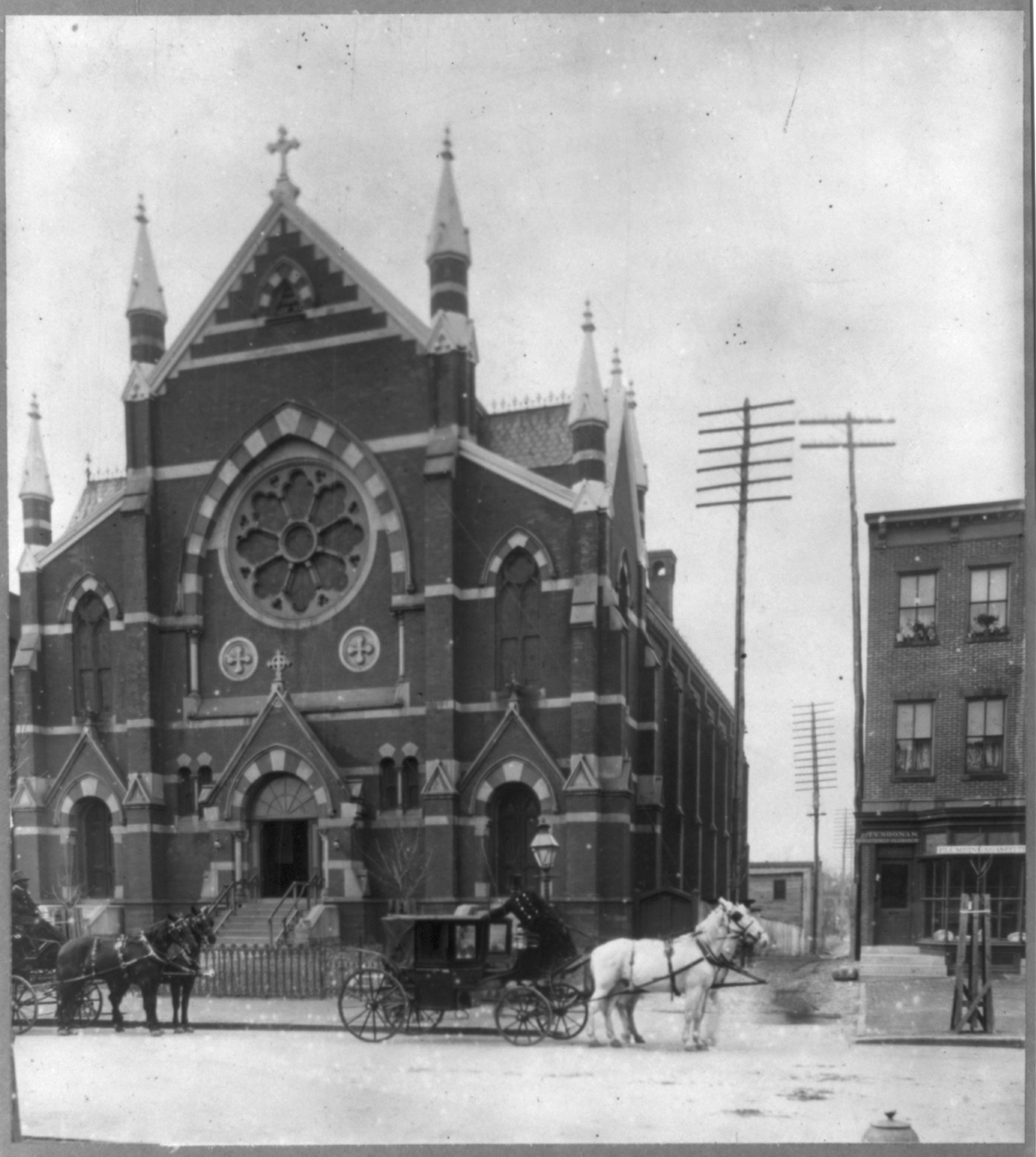
Old St. Augustine, circa 1899; view from 15th Street with two horse-drawn carriages. This photo was part of a display on the "present conditions" of African Americans for the 1900 Paris Exposition.

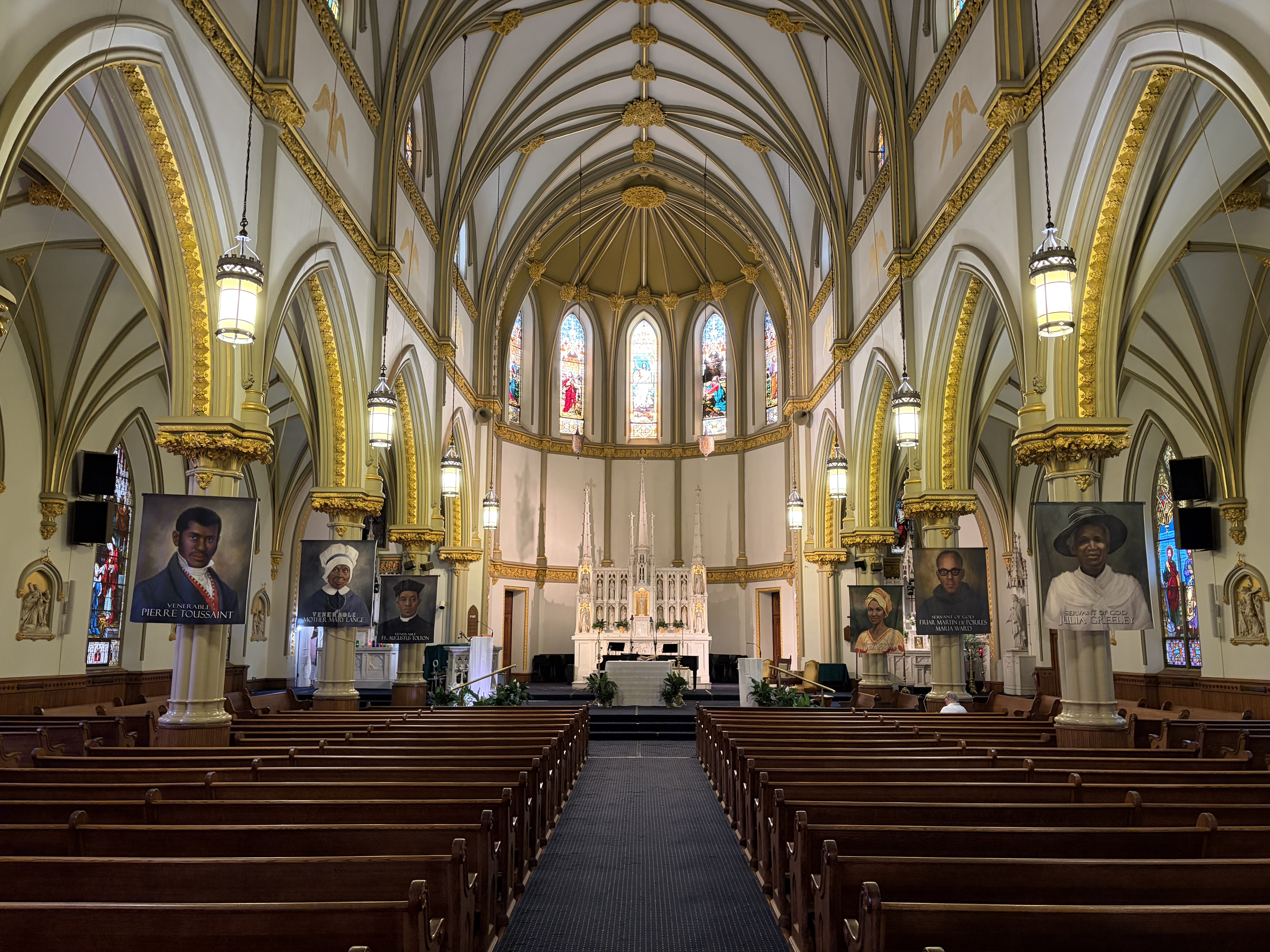
The nave of St. Augustine Catholic Church in 2026

Because of Jim Crow laws in the 1850s, emancipated black Catholic attendees of St. Matthew's Cathedral on Rhode Island Avenue were segregated and relegated to worship in the basement of the church.

In 1858, the group of emancipated black Catholics founded Saint Martin de Porres Church, in honor of Peruvian Dominican brother St Martin de Porres. It was the first Black Catholic parish in Washington, D.C., and its original location was on 15th Street NW, near L Street.

That same year, the parish opened a school for Black children in the district—inaugurated five years before the Emancipation Proclamation, after which education of Black children gradually became mandatory.

=== Saint Martin de Porres era ===
On July 4, 1864, their group raised building funds at the "strawberry festival" on the White House grounds, hosted by Abraham Lincoln and his wife Mary Todd Lincoln.

=== Saint Augustine era ===
In 1876, the church building was inaugurated and re-dedicated to Saint Augustine. It was a 60-foot building with two Gothic spires, and seating for 2,500 people. In 1928, it acquired property at 15th and S Streets N.W., where it eventually built a new school, rectory, convent, and new church building.

In 1946 the original church was sold, under circumstances which are debated, for $300,000, and operations shifted to the 15th and S property; the last Mass in its original building was held on Christmas Day. It was demolished the next year. The site became the location of the Washington Post newspaper, and remained the Post's home until 2016 when the site was sold to private developers.

==== Current church and building ====
In 1961 St. Augustine Church merged with St. Paul's Church, a parish whose original membership was primary of Irish and German descent, located at 15th and V Street. It was renamed to Sts. Paul and Augustine Church. In 1979, as St. Paul's continued to dwindle, the decision was made to consolidate operations on the old St. Paul campus, and that the 15th and S property would be sold. On November 12, 1982, Cardinal Hickey decreed that the parish would be renamed once again to Saint Augustine Catholic Church.

The parish did not have a Black pastor until January 1991, when Fr. Russell L. Dillard was installed. In 2019, the church had 3,000 members in an active congregation of approximately 1,000 families, primarily Black and middle-class.

The present building is made with crafted stone and also has two spires as the original building once had.

== See also ==
- Roman Catholic Archdiocese of Washington
- Dunbar High School (Washington, D.C.)
- Howard University
