= Patrick O'Boyle (cardinal) =

Catholic cardinal

His Eminence Patrick Aloysius O'Boyle
- Cardinal, Archbishop of Washington
- See: Washington
- Appointed: November 29, 1947
- Installed: January 21, 1948
- Term ended: March 3, 1973
- Predecessor: Michael Joseph Curley
- Successor: William Wakefield Baum
- Other post: Cardinal-Priest of S. Nicola in Carcere

Orders
- Ordination: May 21, 1921 by Patrick Joseph Hayes
- Consecration: January 14, 1948 by Francis Spellman
- Created cardinal: June 26, 1967 by Paul VI

Personal details
- Born: Patrick Aloysius O'Boyle; July 18, 1896 Scranton, Pennsylvania
- Died: August 10, 1987 (aged 91) Washington, D.C.
- Denomination: Roman Catholic Church
- Motto: State in fide (steadfast in faith)

Styles of Patrick O'Boyle
- Reference style: His Eminence
- Spoken style: Your Eminence
- Informal style: Cardinal
- See: Washington

Ordination history of Patrick O'Boyle
History
Episcopal consecration
- Consecrated by: Francis Spellman
- Date: January 14, 1948
Episcopal succession
Bishops consecrated by Patrick O'Boyle as principal consecrator
- Edward John Herrmann: April 26, 1966

Patrick Aloysius O'Boyle (July 18, 1896 – August 10, 1987) was an American Catholic prelate who served as the first resident Archbishop of Washington from 1948 to 1973. He was elevated to the cardinalate in 1967.

== Early life and education ==
Patrick O'Boyle was born on July 18, 1896, in Scranton, Pennsylvania, to Michael and Mary (née Muldoon) O'Boyle, who were Irish immigrants. His father was originally from Glenties, County Donegal, and in 1889 came to the United States, where he settled at Bedford, New York. His mother moved to New York City from County Mayo in 1879, and married O'Boyle in December 1893. Shortly afterwards, the couple moved to Scranton, where Michael became a steelworker; they had a daughter who died during infancy in 1895.

Patrick O'Boyle was baptized at St. Paul's Church in Scranton. Following Michael's death in January 1907, he helped support his mother by becoming a paperboy. He dropped out of school in 1910 to pursue a full-time career with the Bradstreet Company, but entered St. Thomas College in 1911. In addition to his studies, he there served as class librarian and editor of the monthly magazine The Aquinas.

O'Boyle graduated from St. Thomas' as valedictorian in 1916, and then began his studies for the priesthood at St. Joseph's Seminary in Yonkers, New York. During his time at St. Joseph's, he developed a close friendship with Reverend James McIntyre, a future cardinal. McIntyre tutored O'Boyle in Latin and invited him to spend holidays with his family. One of O'Boyle's professors was Reverend Francis P. Duffy, a famed US Army chaplain of World War I.

== Priesthood ==
O'Boyle was ordained a priest for the Archdiocese of New York by Archbishop Patrick Hayes on May 21, 1921. The next day he celebrated his first mass at St. Paul's Church in his native Scranton. After his ordination, the archdiocese assigned O'Boyle as a curate at St. Columba's Church in the Chelsea section of Manhattan. While there, he organized St. Joseph's Society for teenage boys, beginning with about 300 members, and instituted parish dances.

In 1926, Hayes named O'Boyle as director of the Catholic Guardian Society, a division of Catholic Charities that handled orphans and foster children; during this time, he also resided and did pastoral work at the Church of the Holy Innocents in Manhattan. Sheila Wickouski identifies social concerns, labor rights, and racial equality as having been O'Boyle's key issues. O'Boyle furthered his studies at the New York School of Social Work in Manhattan from 1927 to 1932. He also taught child welfare at Fordham Graduate School of Social Service in Manhattan from 1930 to 1934.

In 1933, O''Boyle was asked to organize Catholic Charities in New York. O'Boyle worked closely with the federal Works Progress Administration to find jobs for young people in the archdiocese. He then served as director of the Mission of the Immaculate Virgin in Staten Island, New York, from 1936 to 1943.

The Vatican raised O'Boyle to the rank of a privy chamberlain in 1941 and a domestic prelate in 1944. He was named director of the War Relief Services of the National Catholic Welfare Conference in 1943, then director of Catholic Charities in New York in August 1947.

== Archbishop of Washington ==
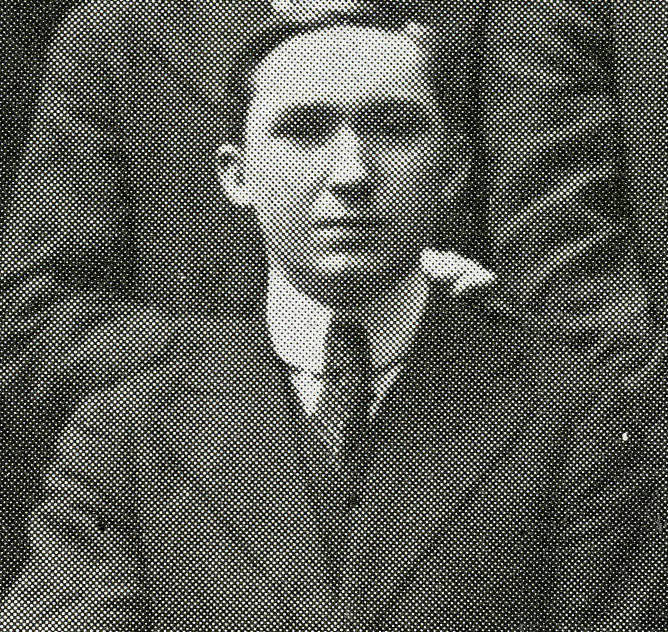
Patrick O'Boyle (1916)

According to the historian Raymond Kupke, O'Boyle's work at War Relief Services and his skill in dealing with governmental and non-governmental agencies during the war and postwar periods caught the attention of the apostolic delegate to the United States, Archbishop Amleto Giovanni Cicognani.

On November 27, 1947, O'Boyle was appointed archbishop of Washington by Pope Pius XII. O'Boyle received his episcopal consecration on January 14, 1948, from Cardinal Francis Spellman, with Bishops John McNamara and Henry Klonowski serving as co-consecrators, in St. Patrick's Cathedral in New York City. According to Wickouski, O'Boyle's view of his role was shaped by his experience as an administrator under Spellman.

Known for his opposition to racism, O'Boyle in 1948 racially integrated the Catholic schools of Washington six years before the U.S. Supreme Court ruled segregation in the public schools to be unconstitutional. He started with the city of Washington first and then expanded to the southern counties of Maryland in the archdiocese. The colleges and universities were integrated first, followed by the high schools and the primary schools.

In 1949, O'Boyle delivered the benediction at the inauguration ceremony of US President Harry S. Truman. In Washington, O’Boyle consecrated the United States to the Immaculate Heart of Mary.

From 1962 to 1965, O'Boyle attended the Second Vatican Council in Rome. He was made Metropolitan Archbishop on October 12, 1965, upon Washington's promotion to that ecclesiastical status. On August 28, 1963, he delivered the invocation that began the March on Washington for Jobs and Freedom.

In April 1964, in the midst of the debate by the US Congress on the Civil Rights Act of 1964, O'Boyle chaired the Inter-religious Convocation on Civil Rights at Georgetown University. In giving the invocation, O'Boyle said that:

There is in every man a priceless dignity which is your heritage. From this dignity flow the rights of man, and the duty in justice that all must respect and honor these rights....

In his remarks, O'Boyle urged Congress to pass the bill and those present to "tell our Representatives our conviction that such a law is a moral obligation."

== Cardinal ==
O'Boyle was created cardinal priest of the Church of San Nicola in Carcere in Rome by Pope Paul VI in the consistory of June 26, 1967. O'Boyle resigned as archbishop of Washington on March 3, 1973, after 25 years of service.

== Death ==
O'Boyle died in Washington, D.C., at Providence Hospital in 1987 at age 91.He was the first person to be interred in a burial chamber constructed inside the Cathedral of St. Matthew the Apostle for the archbishops of Washington.

== Views ==
O'Boyle was socially progressive, but theologically conservative. He was an ardent supporter of Paul VI's 1968 encyclical Humanae Vitae, and placed ecclesiastical censures on priests who dissented from its teachings. During his younger days, he supported Wisconsin Governor Robert M. La Follette, Sr. and New York Governor Al Smith.

A staunch opponent of racism, O'Boyle wrote:

Those who deny a neighbor, solely on the basis of race, the opportunity to buy a house, or to enjoy equal educational and job opportunities, are in effect denying those rights to Christ Himself.

Catholic Church titles
| Preceded by Michael Joseph Curley (Archbishop of Baltimore-Washington) | Archbishop of Washington; 1947–1973 | Succeeded by William Wakefield Baum |
