= Catholic Standard =

Official weekly newspaper for the Roman Catholic Archdiocese of Washington

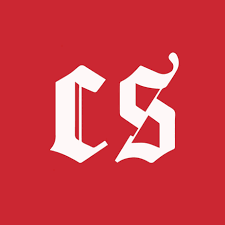
- Logo
- Type: Weekly newspaper (Thursday)
- Owner: Carroll Publishing Company
- Publisher: Cardinal Robert W. McElroy
- Founded: 1951; 74 years ago
- Language: English
- Headquarters: Washington, D.C., U.S.
- Circulation: 51,000 (as of 2019)
- Sister newspapers: El Pregonero
- ISSN: 0411-2741
- OCLC number: 11760218
- Website: www.cathstan.org

The Catholic Standard, founded in 1951, is the official weekly newspaper for the Roman Catholic Archdiocese of Washington.

One of two newspapers published by Carroll Publishing Company, the Catholic Standard serves the nearly 600,000 Catholics living in the nation's capital and the five surrounding the Maryland counties of Calvert, Charles, Montgomery, Prince George's, and St. Mary's. Its sister publication, El Pregonero, is the D.C. area's oldest Spanish-language weekly. The publisher of both newspapers is the Archbishop of Washington, Archbishop Wilton D. Gregory, whose weekly column "What I Have Seen and Heard" appears in both papers and on both websites. The newspaper circulates approximately 46,000 copies each week, mostly delivered by U.S. mail to subscribers and parishes of the archdiocese.

Prior to the Catholic Standard's founding in 1951, Catholics in the Archdiocese of Washington were served by a regional edition of the Catholic Review, the official newspaper of the Archdiocese of Baltimore. The Catholic Standard's founding editor was Father Philip Hannan, who went on to become an auxiliary bishop in Washington and the archbishop of New Orleans.
