= Roy Edward Campbell =

American Catholic bishop (born 1947)

His Excellency, The Most Reverend Roy Edward Campbell
- Auxiliary Bishop Emeritus of Washington
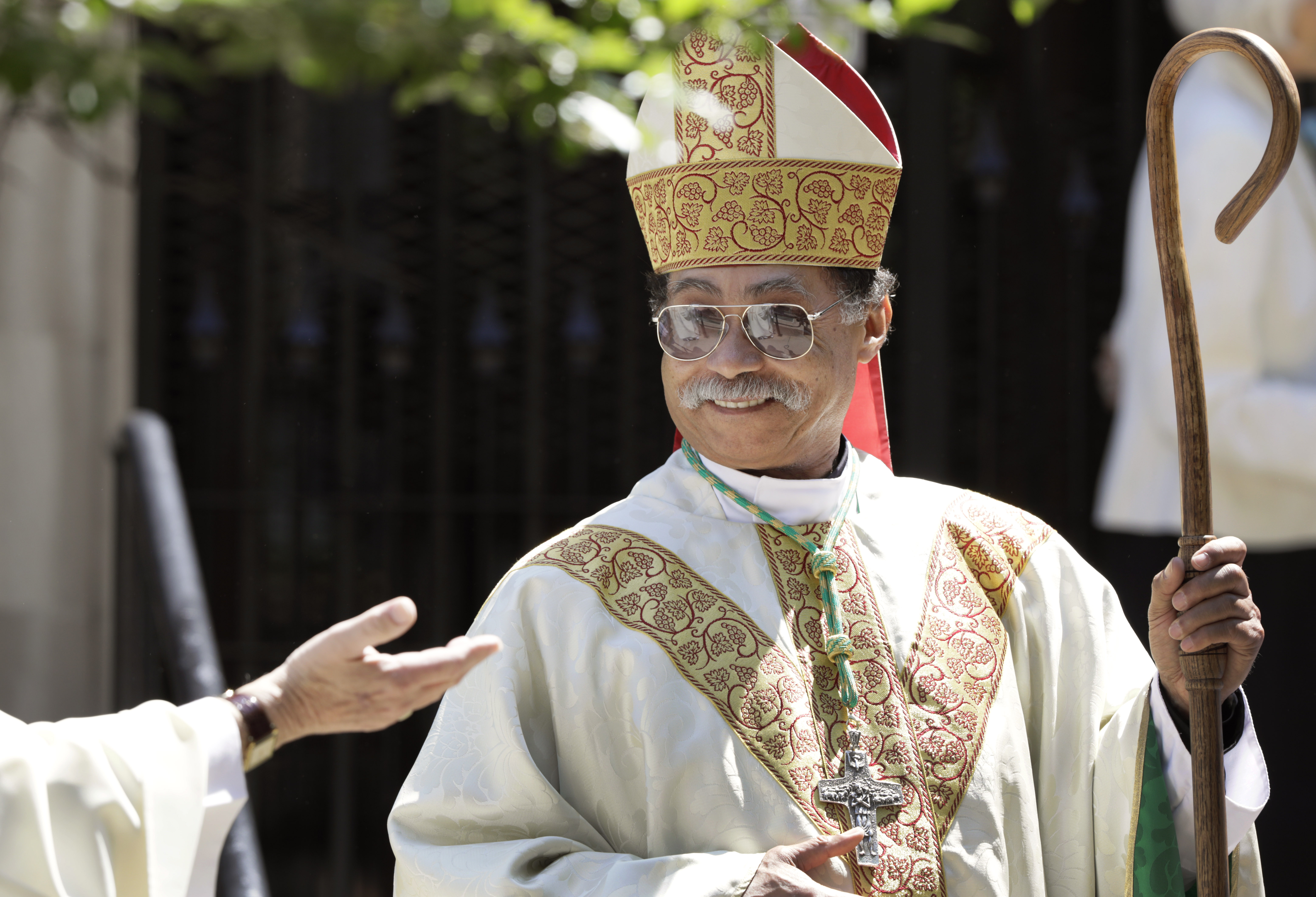
- Campbell in 2019
- Archdiocese: Washington
- Appointed: March 8, 2017
- Installed: April 21, 2017
- Retired: May 1, 2026
- Other post: Titular Bishop of Urces

Orders
- Ordination: May 26, 2007 by Donald Wuerl
- Consecration: April 21, 2017 by Donald Wuerl, Martin Holley, and Barry Christopher Knestout

Personal details
- Born: November 19, 1947 (age 78) Pomonkey, Maryland, US
- Education: Howard University; University of Virginia; Pope St. John XXIII National Seminary
- Motto: Do whatever He tells you

Styles of Roy Edward Campbell
- Reference style: His Excellency; The Most Reverend
- Spoken style: Your Excellency
- Religious style: Bishop

Roy Edward Campbell Jr. (born November 19, 1947) is an African-American prelate of the Catholic Church who served as an auxiliary bishop for the Archdiocese of Washington in the District of Columbia (2017–2026).

== Biography ==
=== Priesthood ===
Campbell was born on November 19, 1947, in Pomonkey, Maryland, to Roy Edward Campbell, Sr. and Julia Ann (Chesley) Campbell. He has three brothers and two sisters. Roy Campbell attended Bruce Elementary Public School and then Shrine of the Sacred Heart School. Campbell graduated from Archbishop Carroll High School in Washington in 1965.

After high school, Campbell entered Howard University in Washington. He was awarded a Bachelor of Science degree in zoology, with minor concentrations in chemistry and anthropology. After college, Campbell worked as a bank teller at Suburban Trust Company in Maryland to finance his graduate school studies. He received a Master of Arts degree in retail banking from the McIntire School of Commerce at the University of Virginia in Charlottesville, Virginia in 1992.

Campbell worked in banking until his retirement in 2002. Having decided at that point to become a priest, he entered the Pope St. John XXIII National Seminary in Weston, Massachusetts, in 2003. He was awarded a Master of Divinity degree in 2007.

=== Priesthood ===
On May 26, 2007, Campbell was ordained to the priesthood for the Archdiocese of Washington by Cardinal Donald Wuerl. Former Cardinal Theodore McCarrick provided Campbell with an exemption for his age. After his 2007 ordination, the archdiocese assigned Campbell as parochial vicar at St. Augustine Catholic Church in Washington.

In 2008, Campbell was appointed pastor of Assumption Parish in Washington, then moved in 2010 to serve as pastor of St. Joseph Parish in Largo, Maryland.

== Episcopal career ==
=== Auxiliary Bishop of Washington ===
Pope Francis appointed Campbell as an auxiliary bishop for the Archdiocese of Washington on March 8, 2017. On April 21, 2017, Campbell was consecrated as a bishop by Cardinal Wuerl at the Cathedral of St. Matthew the Apostle in Washington, with Bishops Martin Holley and Barry Knestout serving as co-consecrators.

Campbell's episcopal coat of arms contains a lion derived from McCarrick's coat of arms and a tower derived from Wuerl's coat of arms. On March 21, 2019, Campbell was elected president of the National Black Catholic Congress, succeeding Bishop John Ricard.

Campbell was involved in controversy in the fall of 2025 when the United States Conference of Catholic Bishops published—and latter pulled—DEI means God, a reflective essay he wrote concerning the diversity, equity, and inclusion policies of the second Trump administration.

On May 1, 2026, Pope Leo XIV accepted his resignation after reaching and surpassing the customary retirement age of 75.

== See also ==
- Catholic Church hierarchy
- Catholic Church in the United States
- Historical list of the Catholic bishops of the United States
- List of Catholic bishops of the United States
- Lists of patriarchs, archbishops, and bishops

== Episcopal succession ==
Catholic Church titles
Preceded by -	Auxiliary Bishop of Washington; 2017-2026	Succeeded by -
