= Gary Studniewski =

American Catholic prelate (born 1957)

His Excellency, The Most Reverend Gary Studniewski
- Auxiliary Bishop of Washington
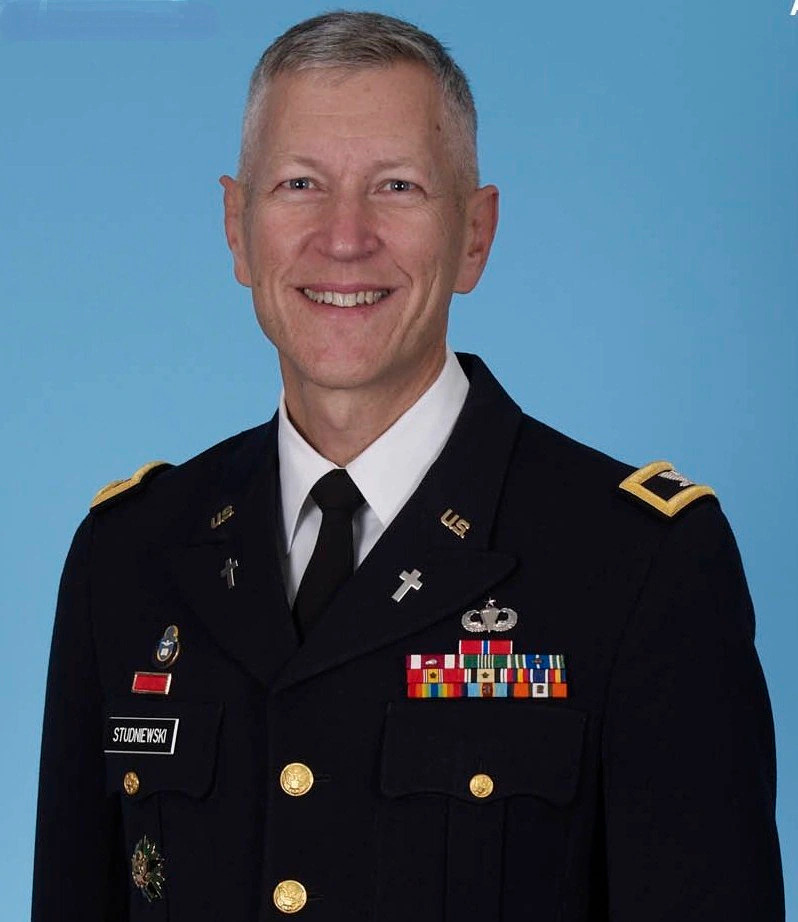
- Church: Catholic Church
- Archdiocese: Washington
- Appointed: May 1, 2026
- Installed: July 7, 2026
- Other post: Titular Bishop of Jamestown

Orders
- Ordination: June 24, 1995 by James Aloysius Hickey
- Consecration: July 7, 2026 by Robert McElroy, Wilton Gregory, and Mark E. Brennan

Personal details
- Born: May 8, 1957 (age 69) Toledo, Ohio, U.S.
- Education: University of Toledo; Pontifical University of Saint Thomas Aquinas
- Motto: Sufficit tibi gratia Mea (Latin for 'My grace is sufficient for you')
- Styles
- Reference style: His Excellency; The Most Reverend
- Spoken style: Your Excellency
- Religious style: Bishop

Gary Richard Studniewski (born May 8, 1957) is an American Catholic prelate serving as an auxiliary bishop of the Archdiocese of Washington since 2026.

== Early life and education ==
Gary Richard Studniewski was born on May 8, 1957, in Toledo, Ohio. He is the son of the late Richard and Alfreda (née Zarecki) Studniewski and he had a sister, Karen. He earned a Bachelor of Education degree in biology from the University of Toledo, where he also joined the Reserve Officers' Training Corps (ROTC).

Upon graduation, Studniewski received a commission as a second lieutenant in the U.S. Army. He served in the 82nd Airborne Division Artillery (1980–1981), the 3rd Infantry Division Artillery (1983–1986), and the Army Personnel Command in Alexandria, Virginia (1987–1989).

In 1989, Studniewski left active duty to study for the priesthood. He began his formation at Mount St. Mary's University in Emmitsburg, Maryland, then continued his studies in Rome while residing at the Pontifical North American College. He earned a Licentiate in Sacred Theology from the Pontifical University of Saint Thomas Aquinas in Rome.

== Priesthood ==
On June 24, 1995, Studniewski was ordained a priest by Cardinal James Aloysius Hickey at the Basilica of the National Shrine of the Immaculate Conception in Washington D.C. for the Archdiocese of Washington. He briefly served as a parochial vicar at St. John Parish in Hollywood, Maryland, before re-entering active duty in the United States Army Chaplain Corps. As a chaplain, Studniewski ministered to soldiers in the 82nd Airborne Division (1998–2000), the Multinational Force and Observers (2001), and to those stationed at Fort Belvoir in Fairfax County, Virginia, (2002–2005). Studniewski was next assigned to the office of the Chief of Chaplains at The Pentagon, and then deployed with the 555th Engineer Brigade in Iraq.

Upon returning from Iraq, Studniewski was promoted to the rank of colonel and appointed garrison chaplain at the new Joint Base Lewis–McChord near Tacoma, Washington, in 2009. He was then assigned as the command chaplain for United States Army North at Fort Sam Houston in San Antonio, Texas, in 2012. His last military assignment was as command chaplain at the Joint Force Headquarters – National Capital Region at Fort Lesley J. McNair in Washington (2014–2016).

Studniewski retired from the Army in 2016. That same year, the Archdiocese of Washington assigned him as administrator of St. Francis Xavier Church in Leonardtown, Maryland, Maryland. In 2017, he was named pastor of St. Peter's Parish in the Capitol Hill area of Washington, D.C. While serving at St. Peter’s, Studniewski denounced the January 6 United States Capitol attack, describing the “sickening unrest” as “very disturbing, very disheartening.” in 2022, the archdiocese appointed him as pastor of the Shrine of the Most Blessed Sacrament in Washington.

== Episcopacy ==
On May 1, 2026, Studniewski was appointed as an auxiliary bishop of Washington and as titular bishop of Jamestown by Pope Leo XIV.

Studniewski was ordained a bishop on July 7, 2026, by Cardinal Robert McElroy at the Basilica of the National Shrine of the Immaculate Conception, with Cardinal Wilton Gregory and Bishop Mark E. Brennan serving as co-consecrators.

== Episcopal succession ==
Catholic Church titles
Preceded by -	Auxiliary Bishop of Washington; 2026-present	Succeeded by -
