= St. John Paul II Seminary =

Coordinates: 38°56′23″N 77°0′17″W

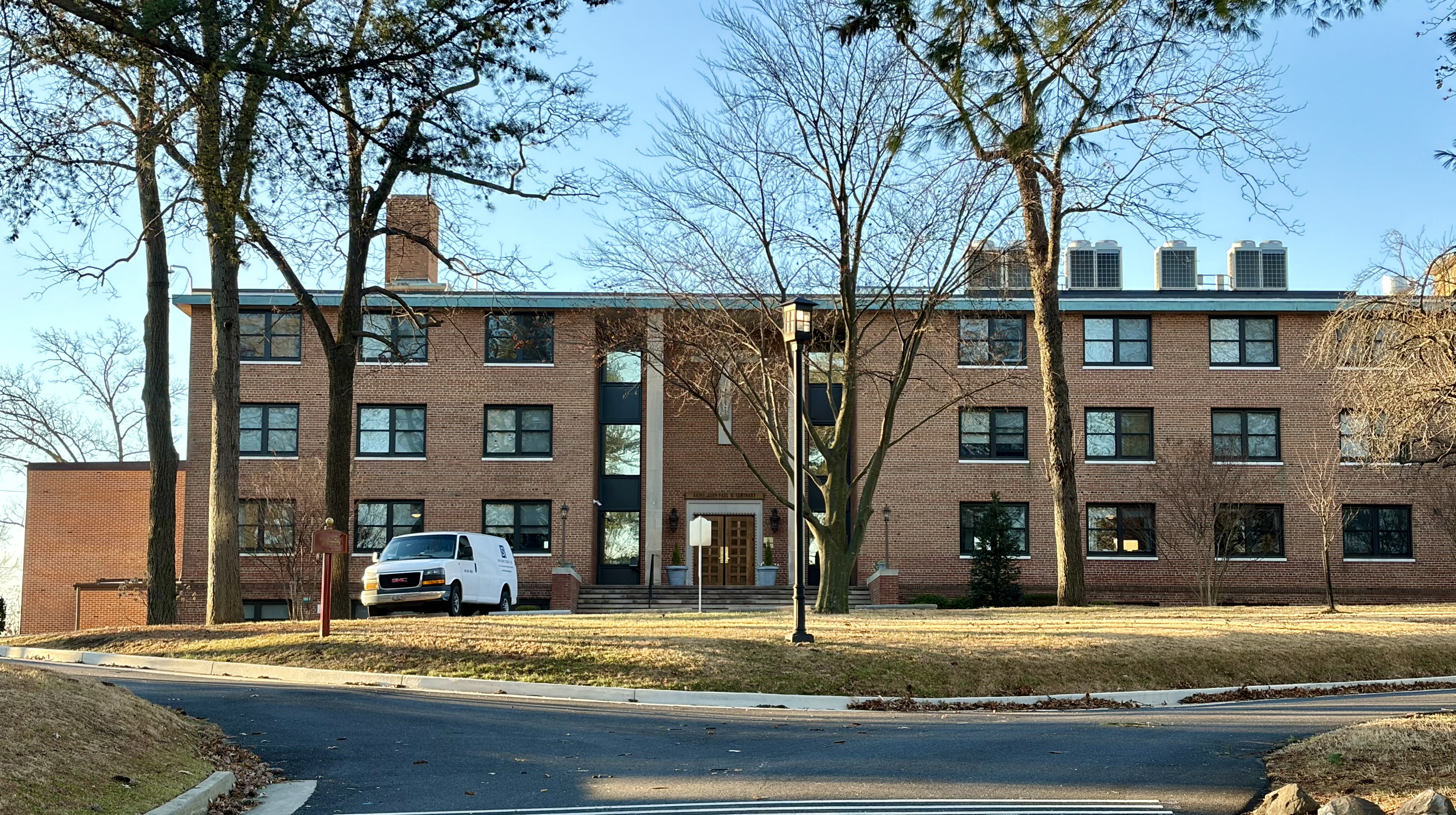
- St. John Paul II Seminary's location in Northeast Washington, D.C.
- Type: Catholic seminary
- Established: 2011
- Affiliations: Catholic Church (Archdiocese of Washington)
- Rector: Rev. Mark R. Ivany
- Location: Washington, D.C., United States
- Website: jp2seminary.org

St. John Paul II Seminary is a Catholic diocesan minor seminary located at 145 Taylor Street in northeast Washington, D.C. The seminary is owned and administered by the Archdiocese of Washington and was founded in 2011 by Cardinal Donald Wuerl. The seminary is named after Pope St. John Paul II.

St. John Paul II Seminary is located near the Basilica of the National Shrine of the Immaculate Conception and the campus of The Catholic University of America, where the seminarians receive their academic formation. After completing their philosophy requirements, the seminarians transfer to a major seminary for the completion of their priestly formation.

== History ==
Cardinal Donald Wuerl established the seminary on May 1, 2011. The site of the seminary was the former seminary for the Society of the Atonement, which was originally built in 1951. After the Archdiocese of Washington purchased the building for office usage, the building was then re-configured as a seminary for pre-theology and college seminarians.

The new seminary opened on October 22, 2011; the first feast day of the recently beatified John Paul II. Cardinal Wuerl celebrated the Opening Mass; remarking, “The men who will be formed here are preparing to be priests of this millennium, the agents of the Holy Spirit renewing the face of the earth and the voice of the New Evangelization calling all people near and far to embrace the Lord Jesus." Concelebrants for the Opening Mass included Cardinal William Wakefield Baum, Theodore McCarrick, auxiliary bishops of the Archdiocese of Washington, retired bishops, and founding rector Msgr. Robert Panke.

The seminary serves the Archdiocese of Washington and the surrounding dioceses. The seminary also hosts other minor seminarians from other dioceses around the nation who are studying at Catholic University of America.

== Rectors ==
No.	Name	Years served
1.	Rev. Msgr. Robert A. Panke	2011-2019
2.	Rev. Carter H. Griffin	2019–2026
3.	Rev. Mark R. Ivany	2026-Present

== Faculty ==
The faculty consists of a Rector, Vice-Rector and Dean of Men, Director of Spiritual Formation, and adjunct formation advisors and spiritual directors. All of the faculty are priests of the Archdiocese of Washington.
