= El Pregonero =

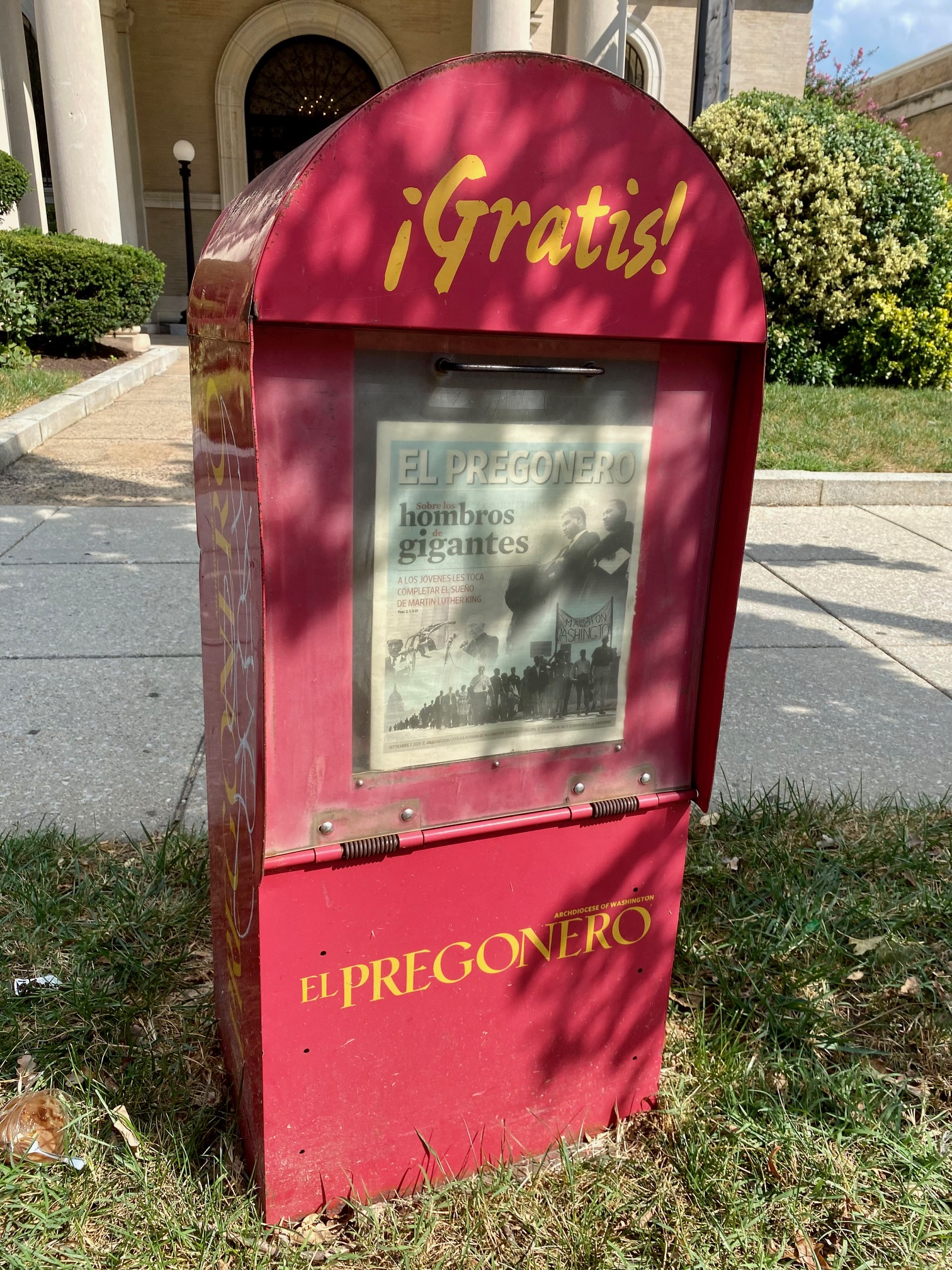
- An El Pregonero newsrack
- Type: Weekly newspaper
- Owner: Carroll Publishing Company
- Founded: 1977
- Language: Spanish
- Headquarters: Washington, D.C.
- ISSN: 8750-9326
- Website: www.elpreg.org

El Pregonero is the official Spanish-language newspaper of the Catholic Archdiocese of Washington, D.C., published by the Carroll Publishing Company. It was first published in 1977 by the Spanish Catholic Center, making it the oldest Spanish-language newspaper published in the capital city of the United States. El Pregonero provides a Catholic perspective on the issues and trends affecting the Hispanic immigrant community residing in the Washington, D.C., metropolitan area. It is printed monthly and distributed to the Hispanic population within the geographical boundaries of the Archdiocese of Washington, which includes D.C., and Montgomery, Prince George's, Calvert, St. Mary's and Charles counties in Maryland. In September 2005, Rafael Roncal, who had been with the paper since 1988, became Editor-in-Chief of the newspaper.

In 1977, the Spanish Catholic Center, a social services agency of the Archdiocese of Washington created the newspaper. The newspaper was founded by Father Sean O'Malley, OFMCap, who was executive director of the Spanish Catholic Center at the time of the newspaper's inception, and later served as the Cardinal Archbishop of Boston from 2003 to 2024. Silverio Coy, a Colombian national, served as its first Editor-in-Chief until he left the post in 1982 to pursue his legal career, and is currently a lawyer.

El Pregonero is a charter member of the National Association of Hispanic Publications (NAHP). In the last 22 years the professional staff has won more than 241 awards for editorial content, design, and general excellence, from the NAHP and the Catholic Press Association of the U.S. and Canada.

The newspaper is owned by the Carroll Publishing Company, a corporation owned by the Catholic Archdiocese of Washington, which also publishes its sister publication, the Catholic Standard. The publisher of both newspapers is always the current Archbishop of Washington, whose regular column appears in both papers and on both websites.

== History ==
=== Founding and Early Period ===
Founded in 1977 by the Spanish Catholic Center, El Pregonero is the oldest, continuously published Spanish-language newspaper in the capital city of the United States. The first Editor-in-Chief of the newspaper was Silverio Coy, a Colombian national who left the post in 1982 to pursue his legal career, and is currently a lawyer. He was replaced by Enrique Eduardo, a renowned Bolivian journalist, until the end of 1985.

In its early years, El Pregonero appeared as a mimeographed newsletter, distributed primarily in the Adams Morgan and Mount Pleasant neighborhoods around the Spanish Catholic Center's office near 16th and Monroe Streets, NW, in Washington, D.C. As the Hispanic population settled in other neighborhoods in D.C. and the nearby Maryland and Virginia suburbs, the newspaper adopted a more traditional tabloid format and circulated more copies in street boxes and at other bulk-drop locations.

=== Carroll Publishing Period ===
Under the direction of the late Cardinal James A. Hickey, Archbishop of Washington, the newspaper was taken over by Carroll Publishing in January 1985. In January 1986, Oscar Reyes, a native of Honduras, who previously served as editor of the Nicaraguan newspaper La Prensa, became the Editor-in-Chief until June 2005, when he retired after nearly 20 years with the paper.

In September 2005, Rafael Roncal, who had been with the paper since 1988, was named Editor-in-Chief of the newspaper. Roncal previously worked as the Washington correspondent for El Nacional in Lima, Peru, and worked for El Comercio and La Prensa newspapers, also located in Lima. Roncal earned a master's degree from The Catholic University of America in 2000. He has received more than 60 awards for editorial excellence from the Catholic Press Association and the NAHP.

El Pregonero circulation grew to as many as 50,000 copies weekly until the company eliminated its Virginia distribution to focus on service to the Hispanic population within the geographical boundaries of the Archdiocese of Washington, which includes D.C., and Montgomery, Prince George's, Calvert, St. Mary's and Charles counties in Maryland. 38,000 free copies circulated weekly until September 2011.

On September 22, 2011, under the leadership of Cardinal Donald Wuerl, Archbishop of Washington, El Pregonero launched its new redesign and adopted a biweekly schedule, alternating weeks with the Catholic Standard. Its “new look’ features more dynamic covers, bolder headlines, bigger photos, more graphics and in-depth stories.

Larger than most Spanish diocesan papers, El Pregonero currently has a circulation of about 25,000 copies in the Washington metropolitan area and is published biweekly with a Thursday dateline. Its on-line edition is updated daily.

Like several Spanish-language Catholic publications, El Pregonero is dropped not only at parishes that have Masses in Spanish and Catholic agencies that serve the Spanish-speaking population, but also at grocery and convenience stores, Metro stations and bus stops, sidewalk kiosks and other venues.

Its newest design earned the ‘Best Redesign’ award, among all newspapers-members at the 2012 convention of the Catholic Press Association: “This publication is beautifully designed throughout — from a cover that demands attention, to inside pages that are accented with creative extras,” commented the judges of the annual competition.
