= Archdiocese of Washington =

Latin Catholic jurisdiction in the United States

Coordinates: 38°57′11″N 76°59′7.4″W

Metropolitan Archdiocese of Washington Archidiœcesis Metropolitae Vashingtonensis

Catholic
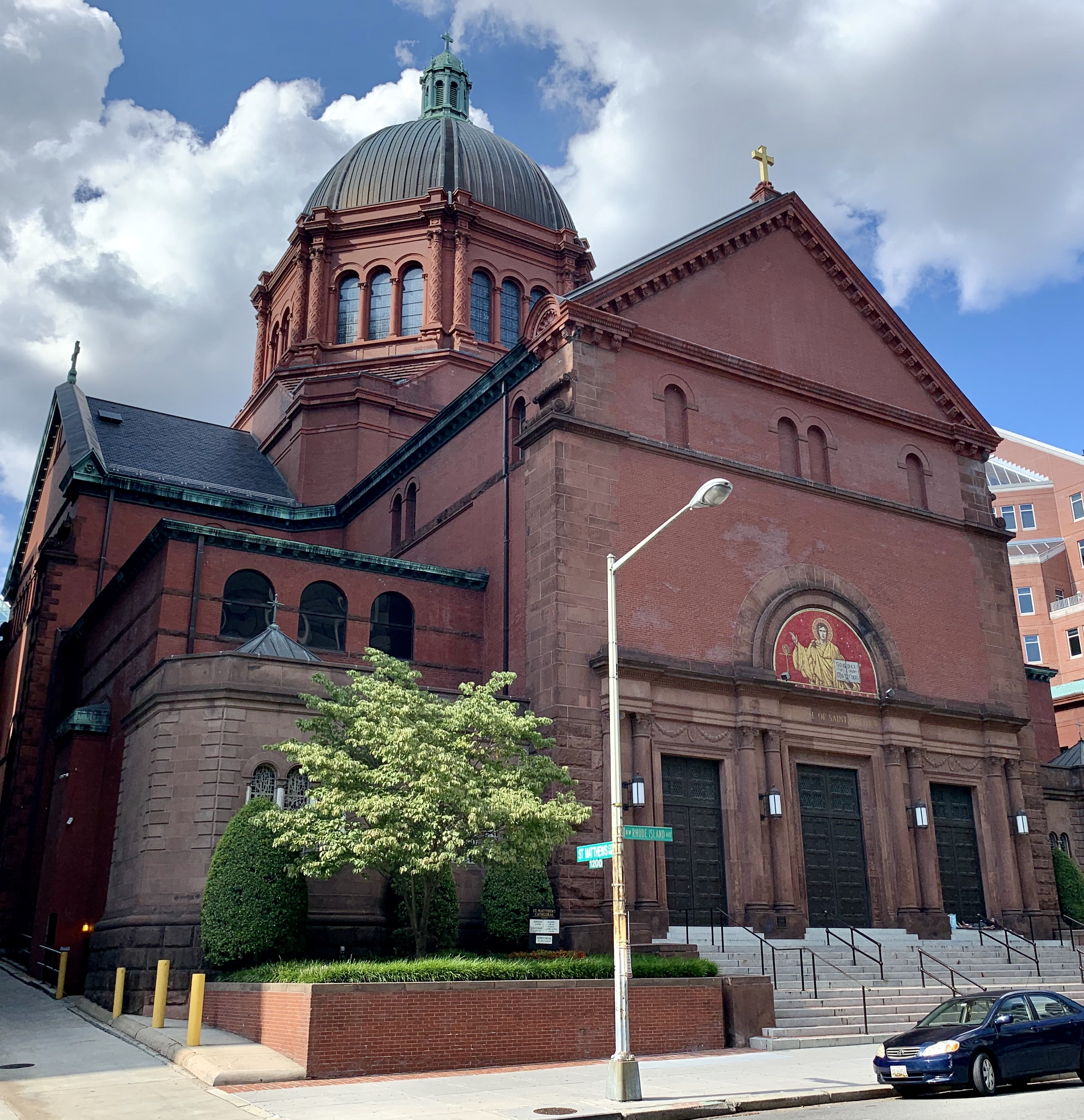
- Cathedral of St. Matthew the Apostle

- Coat of arms

Location
- Country: United States
- Territory: Washington, D.C. and Montgomery, Prince George's, St. Mary's, Calvert, and Charles counties in Maryland
- Episcopal conference: USCCB
- Ecclesiastical region: Region IV
- Ecclesiastical province: Washington
- Headquarters: Hyattsville, Maryland, U.S.

Statistics
- Area: 2,103 sq mi (5,450 km^{2})
- Population: Total; Catholics: (as of 2023); 3,091,984; 647,417 (20.9%)
- Parishes: 139
- Schools: 93

Information
- Denomination: Catholic Church
- Sui iuris church: Latin Church
- Rite: Roman Rite
- Established: July 29, 1939 (87 years ago)
- Cathedral: Cathedral of St. Matthew the Apostle
- Patron saint: Blessed Virgin Mary in her Motherhood
- Secular priests: 427 diocesan; 385 religious; 177 permanent deacons

Current leadership
- Pope: Leo XIV
- Metropolitan Archbishop: Robert W. McElroy
- Auxiliary Bishops: Juan Esposito-Garcia; Gary Studniewski; Robert P. Boxie
- Vicar General: Juan Esposito-Garcia
- Judicial Vicar: Msgr. Charles V. Antonicelli
- Bishops emeritus: Wilton Daniel Gregory; Donald William Wuerl; Roy Edward Campbell

Map
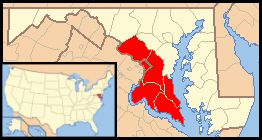

Website
- adw.org

The Archdiocese of Washington (Latin: Archidiœcesis Metropolitae Vashingtonensis) is an archdiocese of the Catholic Church for the District of Columbia and several Maryland counties in the United States. The archdiocese is home to the Basilica of the National Shrine of the Immaculate Conception. The only suffragan diocese of the archdiocese is the Diocese of Saint Thomas. The mother church is the Cathedral of St. Matthew the Apostle in downtown Washington. Robert McElroy is the archbishop.

== Territory ==
The Archdiocese of Washington encompasses the District of Columbia and the following counties in Maryland: Calvert, Charles, Montgomery, Prince George's, and Saint Mary's.

== History ==
=== 1600 to 1700 ===
In the 17th century, the present-day District of Columbia was part of the British Province of Maryland. Unlike the other American colonies, the Province of Maryland had been settled by the 2nd Baron Baltimore, as a haven for Catholic refugees from Great Britain.

On March 25, 1634, the first Catholic Mass in the English-speaking colonies was celebrated by Andrew White, an English Jesuit missionary, to recent immigrants from German states on St. Clement's Island in Maryland. In 1641, White established a small chapel near Port Tobacco to preach to the Piscataway people. Later becoming St Ignatius Parish, it is considered one of the first Catholic parishes in the United States and the first one in Charles County. In 1649, the Maryland Palatinate passed the Maryland Toleration Act, mandating religious tolerance for trinitarian Christians. It was the first law requiring religious tolerance in the English North American colonies.

Due to immigration, by 1660 the population of Maryland had gradually become predominantly Protestant. However, political power remained concentrated in the hands of the largely Catholic elite. In 1689, a group of Puritans, now the majority in the colony, successfully revolted against the colonial government, which had been controlled by the Catholic elite. After gaining power, the Puritans imposed restrictions on Catholics in the colony. To celebrate Mass, Catholics had to set up private chapels in their homes.

=== 1700 to 1800 ===
In 1704, the Assembly of Free Marylanders passed a law prohibiting Catholics from holding political office in the province. After the American Revolution ended in 1781, the Vatican needed to move American Catholics out of the jurisdiction of the Diocese of London. In 1784, the pope established the Prefecture Apostolic of the United States of America, naming John Carroll as the prefect apostolic.

With the passage of the US Constitution in 1789, religious freedom was guaranteed throughout the new United States. In 1789, Pope Pius VI erected the Diocese of Baltimore, covering all of the United States, including the new State of Maryland. The pope named Carroll as the first bishop of Baltimore. The present-day District of Columbia would remain part of this diocese, followed by the Archdiocese of Baltimore, for the next 150 years.

The City of Washington and the District of Columbia were founded in 1791 to become the nation's capital. Carroll founded Georgetown College in what was then the village of Georgetown in 1792. It was the first Catholic and Jesuit institution of higher learning in the United States.

The first Catholic Church in Washington, St. Patrick's, was established in 1794 to minister to the Irish immigrant stonemasons who were constructing the White House and the US Capitol Building. A brick church for St. Patrick's was completed in 1809.

=== 1800 to 1900 ===
In 1814, the British Army entered Washington during the War of 1812 and set the city on fire. William Matthews, pastor of St. Patrick's, saved the church from burning down. He also persuaded British Major General Robert Ross to preserve it from further harm. The first Catholic church in Montgomery County was St. Mary's in Rockville, established as a mission church in 1817.

St. Mary's, the first parish in Calvert County, was established on Solomons Island in 1888, with its church constructed in 1895. It became Our Lady Star of the Seas in 1904. In 1889, the Catholic University of America opened in Washington, the first papally chartered graduate and research university in the country. Trinity College in Washington was founded by the Sisters of Notre Dame de Namur in 1897 as the nation's first Catholic liberal arts college for women. It is today Trinity Washington University.

=== 1900 to 1965 ===
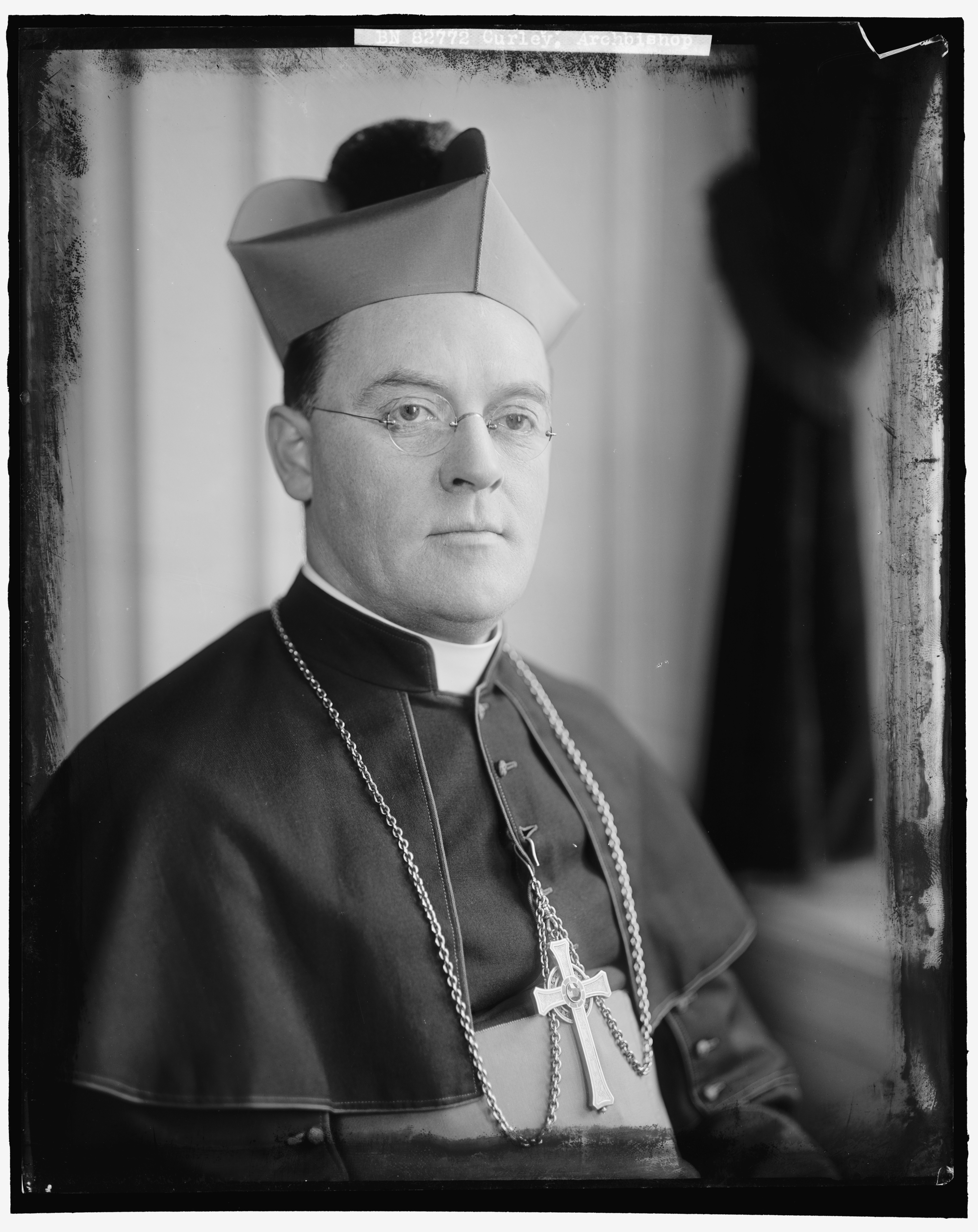
Archbishop Curley (1905)

On July 22, 1939, recognizing the increased population of the District of Columbia, Pope Pius XII erected the new Archdiocese of Washington. The new archdiocese also included five Maryland counties that were close to the district. The pope appointed Michael Curley, then archbishop of Baltimore, to also serve as archbishop of Baltimore and Washington. Curley died in 1947.

Pius XII in 1947 appointed separate archbishops for Baltimore and Washington. His choice as archbishop of Washington was Monsignor Patrick O'Boyle from the Archdiocese of New York. In 1948, O'Boyle racially integrated the Catholic schools in Washington and then the Maryland counties in the diocese. He started first with the colleges and universities, then the high schools, and finally the parochial elementary schools. In 1949, O'Boyle delivered the benediction at the inauguration of U.S. President Harry S. Truman in Washington. In 1954, Pius XII confirmed O’Boyle's request to place the archdiocese under the patronage of Mary, Mother of God, which at the time was celebrated as the Feast of the Maternity of the Blessed Virgin Mary on October 11.

In April 1964, during the United States Congress debate on the Civil Rights Act of 1964, O'Boyle chaired the Inter-religious Convocation on Civil Rights at Georgetown University. In giving the invocation before Congress, O'Boyle said that "There is in every man a priceless dignity which is your heritage. From this dignity flow the rights of man, and the duty in justice that all must respect and honor these rights ..." He urged Congress to pass the bill and those present to "tell our Representatives our conviction that such a law is a moral obligation." The bill was enacted in July 1964.

=== 1965 to 2000 ===
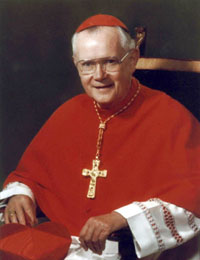
Cardinal Hickey (2024)

The Archdiocese of Washington became a metropolitan see on October 12, 1965, when the Diocese of Saint Thomas became its only suffragan see. O'Boyle retired as archbishop in 1973.

To replace O'Boyle, Paul VI named Bishop William Baum of the Diocese of Springfield-Cape Girardeau as the next archbishop of Washington. In the 1976 consistory, Paul VI named Baum as cardinal-priest of Santa Croce in Via Flaminia. Baum resigned as archbishop of Washington in 1980 to take a position in the Roman Curia in Rome.

Pope John Paul II appointed Bishop James Hickey from the Diocese of Cleveland as archbishop of Washington in 1980. Hickey's tenure in Washington D.C. oversaw a significant expansion of Catholic Charities, which became the region's largest private social service agency. He also established:

- The Archdiocesan Health Care Network
- The Archdiocesan Legal Network, which provided pro bono care for the region's low income residents
- Birthing and Care, which provided pre-natal, delivery and post-natal medical care to women in financial need
- Faith in the city, an initiative to revitalize inner-city Catholic schools
- Victory Housing, which developed assisted and independent living for senior citizens

In conjunction with Mother Teresa, Hickey also founded a Washington convent of the Missionaries of Charity for the care of the homeless and terminally ill. Hickey ordered New Ways Ministry, an unauthorized ministry for LGBTQ+ Catholics, to stop any operations on archdiocese property in the early 1980s. He also forced Georgetown University to stop DignityUSA, a national organization dedicated to LGBTQ+ ministry, from celebrating Mass on campus in 1987.

As chancellor of Catholic University, Hickey ousted theologian Charles Curran from the university's faculty in 1987. Curran had dissented from the church position on artificial contraception. In 1989, Hickey excommunicated African-American priest George Stallings, a one-time protégé, after Stallings formed the unauthorized Imani Temple African-American Catholic Congregation.

=== 2000 to 2010 ===
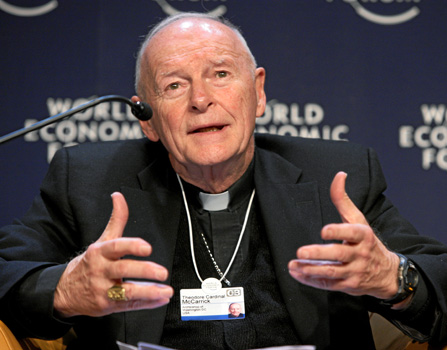
Former Cardinal McCarrick (2008)

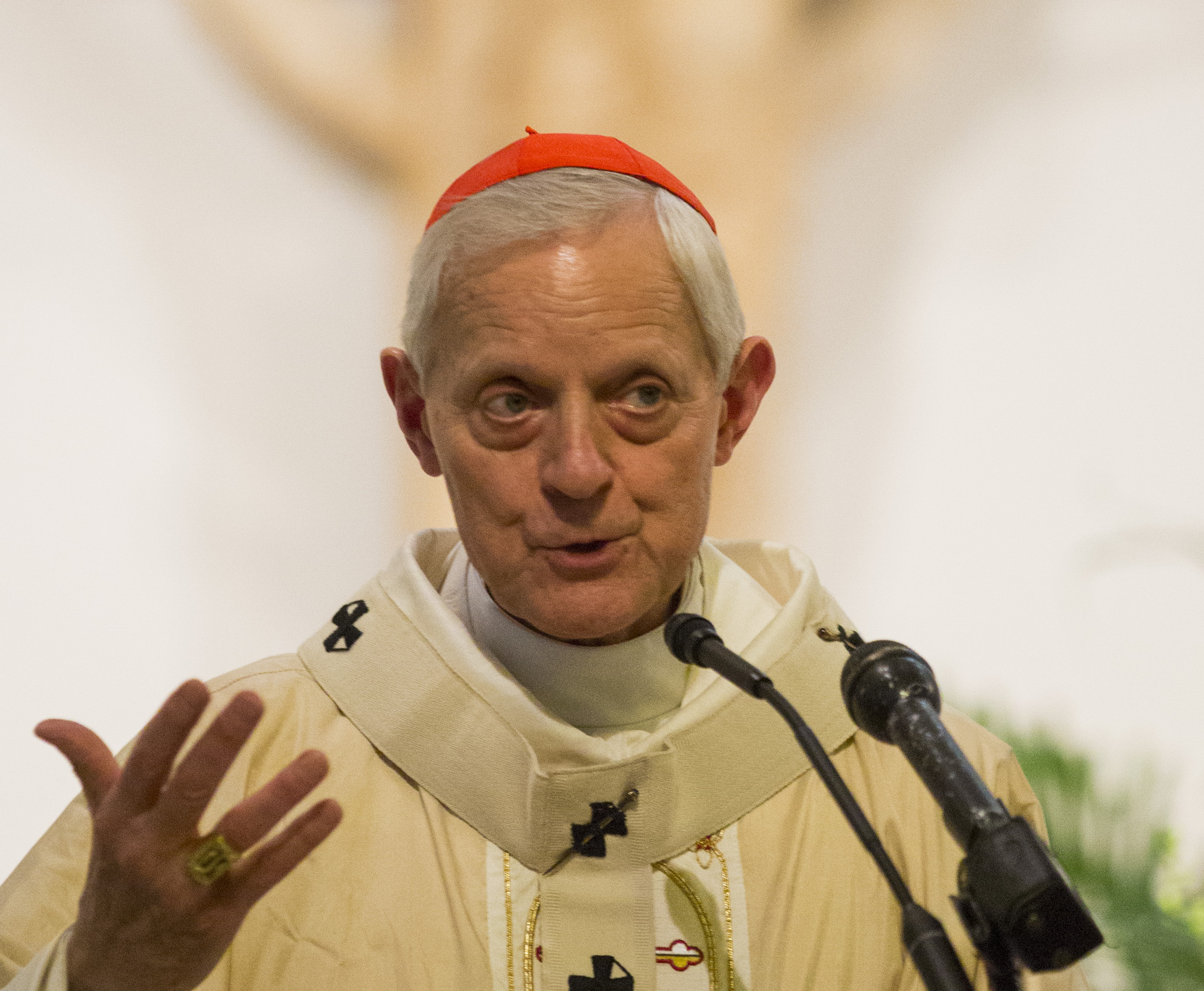
Cardinal Wuerl (2015)

When Hickey retired in 2000, John Paul II named Archbishop Theodore McCarrick from the Archdiocese of Newark as the next archbishop of Washington. McCarrick retired as archbishop in 2008. In November 2002, the Prelature of Opus Dei received a complaint from an adult woman accusing C. John McCloskey of sexual misconduct while he was serving as the director of the Catholic Information Center, a part of the Archdiocese of Washington. Following an investigation, Opus Dei found the accusation to be credible, and McCloskey was removed as director of the center. Restrictions were placed on his pastoral assignments, and Opus Dei paid $977,000 in a settlement reached with the woman in question in 2005. The archdiocese in December 2006 paid a $1.6 million settlement to 16 men with credible accusations of sexual abuse by archdiocesan clergy from 1962 to 1982.

Bishop Donald Wuerl of the Diocese of Pittsburgh was named archbishop of Washington by Benedict XVI in 2008. In late 2009, when the Council of the District of Columbia was debating a bill that would prohibit discrimination against gay men and lesbians, Wuerl advocated for religious liberty provisions that he said would protect the Catholic Church's ability to provide social services, such as adoption in accordance with Catholic teaching on marriage. Soon after Wuerl made this statement, The Washington Post characterized the archdiocese as giving an "ultimatum" to the city. The New York Times termed the statement a "threat". In response, Wuerl said that there was

"...no threat or ultimatum to end services, just a simple recognition that the new requirements by the city for religious organizations to recognize same-sex marriages in their policies could restrict our ability to provide the same level of services as we do now."

When the Council of DC passed the anti-discrimination bill in December 2009, Wuerl stated that it did not adequately protect religious liberty. However, he said that the archdiocese would continue to serve the poor and hoped to be "working in partnership with the District of Columbia consistent with the mission of the Catholic Church."

=== 2010 to 2020 ===
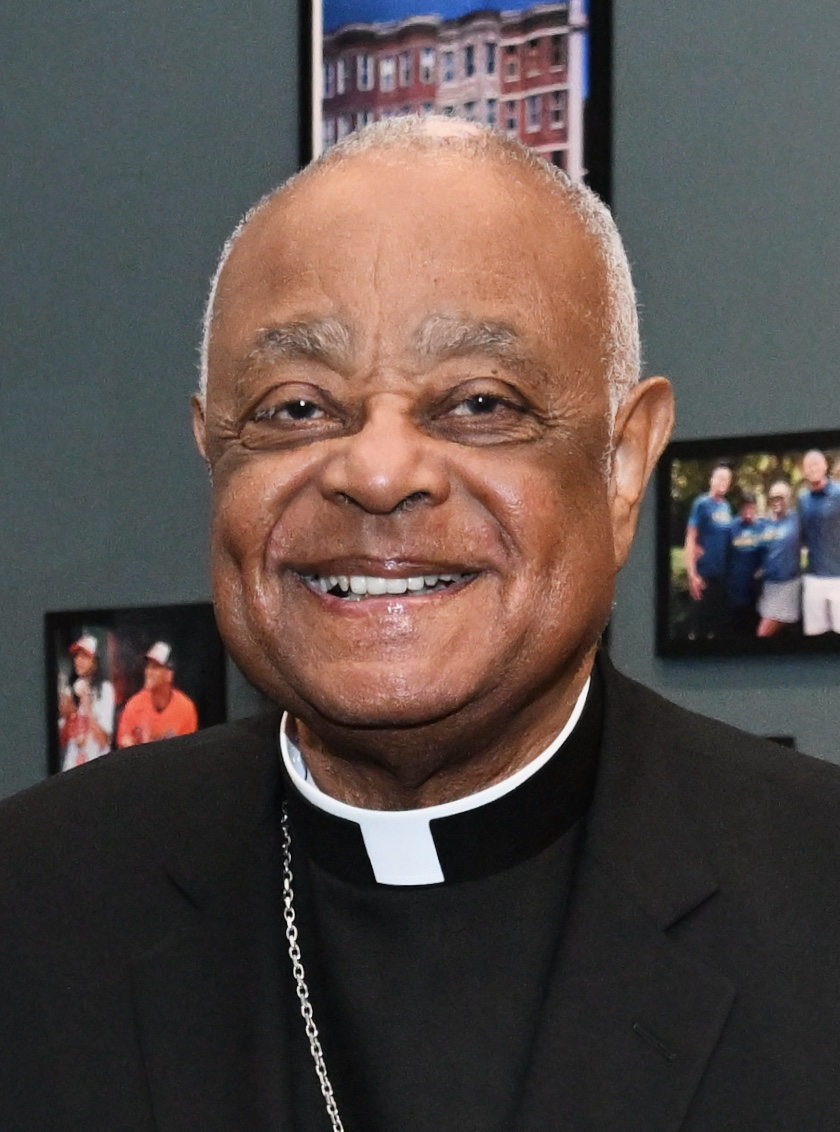
Cardinal Gregory (2024)

In February 2010, Catholic Charities of the Archdiocese of Washington ended its foster care and public adoption programs in the District rather than approve same-sex couples as foster or adoptive parents. The agency also modified its employee health care benefits to avoid having to extend coverage to same-sex couples. In 2011, Wuerl established the Saint John Paul II Seminary in Washington.

The archdiocese and other local Catholic institutions in 2012 sued the US Department of Health and Human Services (HHS) over regulations for prescriptions and health services. The plaintiffs objected to HHS requiring Catholic institutions that do not primarily serve Catholics, such as hospitals or universities, to provide health care coverage to employees for artificial contraception and abortion services for women.

In 2017, the archdiocese sued the Washington Metropolitan Area Transit Authority (WMATA). The archdiocese had tried to purchase Christmas ads that would cover bus exteriors. However, WMATA had refused, citing its policy against religious advertising. The archdiocese lost the case in the lower courts, and the US Supreme Court declined to hear the case.

By August 2018, Wuerl was facing increased criticism over his handling of sexual abuse cases against the clergy when he was bishop of Pittsburgh. At the end of August, Wuerl flew to Rome, where he met with Pope Francis. The pope instructed Wuerl to confer with the priests of the archdiocese regarding his next steps. On September 3, 2018, Wuerl met with over 100 archdiocesan priests. He told them he knew nothing about the McCarrick allegations until they became public. Some priests encouraged Wuerl to resign, while others told him to "stay and be part of the church's healing process." Protesters started appearing outside the bishop's residence and the Basilica of the National Shrine of the Immaculate Conception. On September 8, 2018, Deacon James Garcia, the master of ceremonies at St. Matthew's Cathedral, informed Wuerl that he was refusing to assist him at Mass anymore due to his handling of sexual abuse cases; Garcia asked Wuerl to resign.

In September 2018, the United States Conference of Catholic Bishops (USCCB) announced that it was investigating the archdiocese for reports of sex abuse by clergy. In October 2018, the archdiocese released the names of 31 archdiocesan clergy with credible accusations of sexually abusing minors since 1948.

Wuerl resigned as archbishop of Washington in October 2018. He remained as apostolic administrator in the archdiocese until a successor was installed. In April 2019, Archbishop Wilton Gregory from the Archdiocese of Atlanta was appointed archbishop of Washington by Pope Francis. He became the first African-American to lead the archdiocese. Francis raised Gregory to the rank of cardinal at a consistory in Rome in November 2020.

Urbano Vazquez from the Shrine of the Sacred Heart in Columbia Heights was convicted in August 2019 of four counts of sexual abuse involving two girls. In November 2019, Vazquez was sentenced to 15 years in prison. In December 2019, The Washington Post reported that McCarrick had given John Paul II $90,000 during the early 1990s and Benedict XVI $291,000, starting in 2005. McCarrick also made smaller donations to other Vatican officials, The money came from the "Archbishop's Special Fund", a fund controlled by McCarrick and supported by donations from wealthy Catholics. Some critics accused McCarrick of trying to bribe the Vatican to ignore accusations of sexual abuse against him. The Vatican responded that the donations did not affect any Vatican policies or actions. The archdiocese took in nearly a third less money in its 2019 annual fundraising appeal, which had been renamed from "Cardinal's Appeal" to "Annual Appeal", in the wake of the scandals.

=== 2020 to present ===
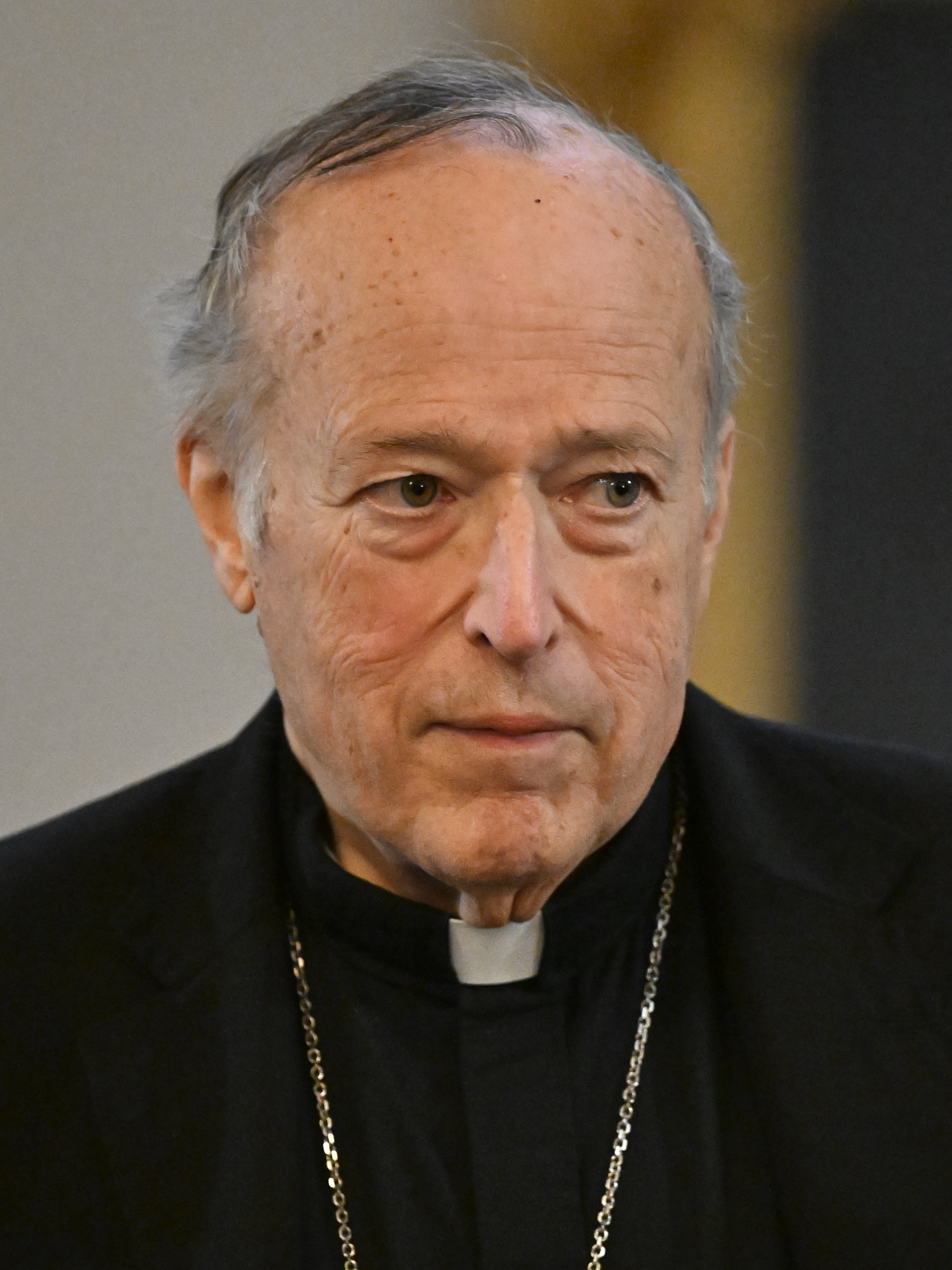
Cardinal McElroy (2025)

The former assistant superintendent of Catholic schools in Washington, Kenneth Gaughan, was charged in September 2018 with embezzling more than $438,000 from the archdiocese. He also took over $2.1 million from the Federal Government in Paycheck Protection Program (PPP) loans and Economic Injury Disaster Loans (EIDL). He pleaded guilty in September 2022 and was sentenced to 78 months in prison.

In December 2020, during the COVID-19 pandemic, the archdiocese sued the City of Washington, objecting to an attendance cap of 50 parishioners per Mass or other service to prevent the spread of infection. Before the suit went to trial, the two parties settled, with the city raising the attendance cap to 250 attendees or one quarter of the church's allowed seating.

St. Jane Frances de Chantal Church in Bethesda, Maryland was the target of an arson and vandalism attack in July 2022. The fire caused no structural damage. However, the eucharist was scattered on the floor of the sanctuary, and statues were overturned.

Pope Francis named Cardinal Robert McElroy as archbishop of Washington on January 6, 2025. Immaculate Conception Church in Washington opened its new Frassati Chapel in August 2025. Named after the Italian Pier Giorgio Frassati, who was canonized in September 2025, the chapel is intended for perpetual adoration of the eucharist.

In October 2025, a man was arrested outside the Cathedral of Saint Matthew just before the start of the annual Red Mass there. Police discovered hundreds of IEDs in a tent that the suspect, Louis Geri, had set up near the building.

== Bishops ==
=== Archbishops of Washington ===
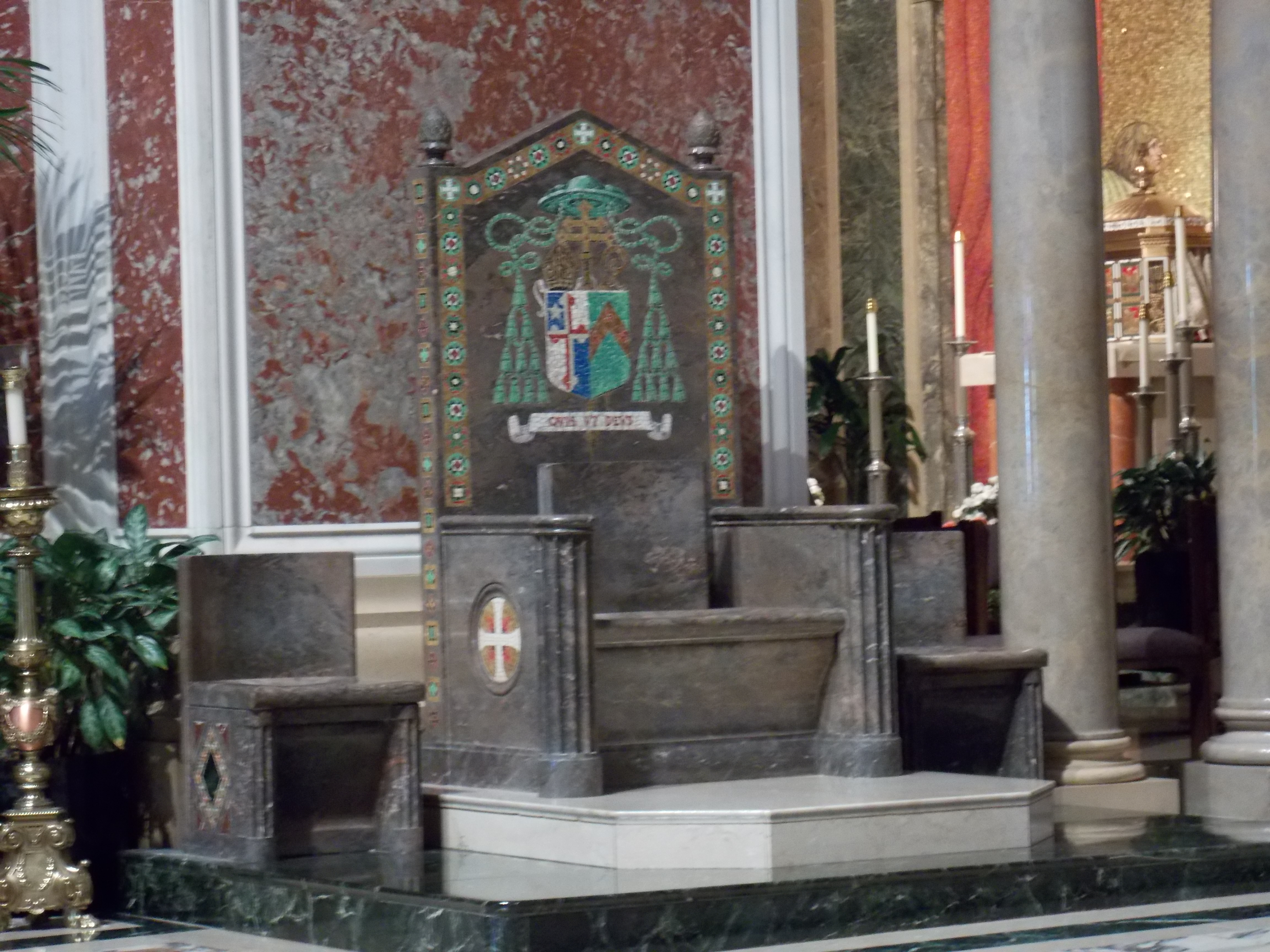
Cathedra in St. Matthew's Cathedral, affixed with Archbishop Curley's coat of arms (2014)

1. Michael Joseph Curley (1939–1947), concurrently the Archbishop of Baltimore
2. Patrick Aloysius O'Boyle (1947–1973)
3. William Wakefield Baum (1973–1980), appointed Prefect of the Congregation for Catholic Education and later Major Penitentiary of the Apostolic Penitentiary
4. James Aloysius Hickey (1980–2000)
5. Theodore Edgar McCarrick (2001–2006; former cardinal, laicized for sexual abuse)
6. Donald William Wuerl (2006–2018)
7. Wilton Daniel Gregory (2019–2025)
8. Robert Walter McElroy (2025–present)

=== Auxiliary bishops ===
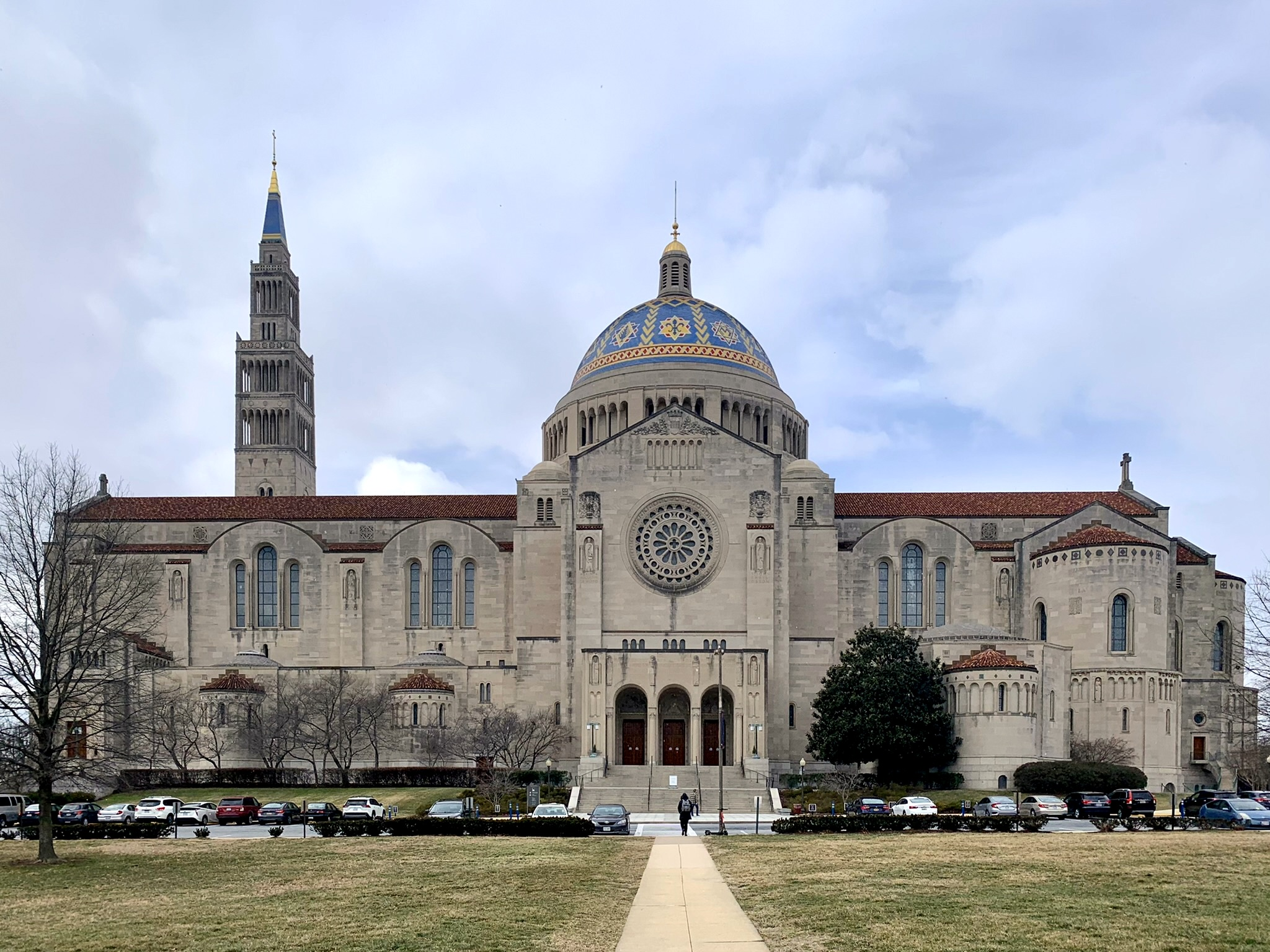
Basilica of the National Shrine of the Immaculate Conception (2022)

- John Michael McNamara (1947–1960)
- Patrick Joseph McCormick (1950–1953)
- Philip Matthew Hannan (1956–1965), appointed Archbishop of New Orleans
- William Joseph McDonald (1964–1967), appointed Auxiliary Bishop of San Francisco
- John Selby Spence (1964–1973)
- Edward John Herrmann (1966–1973), appointed Bishop of Columbus
- Thomas William Lyons (1974–1988)
- Eugene Antonio Marino (1974–1988), appointed Archbishop of Atlanta
- Thomas Cajetan Kelly (1977–1981), appointed Archbishop of Louisville
- Alvaro Corrada del Rio SJ (1985–1997), appointed Apostolic Administrator of Caguas and later Bishop of Tyler and Bishop of Mayaguez
- William George Curlin (1988–1994), appointed Bishop of Charlotte
- Leonard Olivier (1988–2004)
- William E. Lori (1995–2001), appointed Bishop of Bridgeport and later Archbishop of Baltimore
- Kevin Joseph Farrell (2001–2007), appointed Bishop of Dallas and later Prefect of the Dicastery for the Laity, Family and Life (elevated to cardinal in 2016)
- Francisco González Valer (2001–2014)
- Martin Holley (2004–2016), appointed Bishop of Memphis
- Barry Christopher Knestout (2008–2018), appointed Bishop of Richmond
- Mario E. Dorsonville (2015–2023), appointed Bishop of Houma–Thibodaux
- Roy Edward Campbell (2017–2026)
- Michael William Fisher (2018–2020), appointed Bishop of Buffalo
- Juan Esposito-Garcia (2023–present)
- Evelio Menjivar-Ayala (2023–2026), appointed Bishop of Wheeling-Charleston
- Robert P. Boxie (2026–present)
- Gary Studniewski (2026–present)

=== Other archdiocesan priests who became bishops ===
- John Francis Donoghue, appointed Bishop of Charlotte in 1984 and later Archbishop of Atlanta
- David Edward Foley, appointed Auxiliary Bishop of Richmond in 1986 and later Bishop of Birmingham
- Raymond James Boland, appointed Bishop of Birmingham in 1988 and later Bishop of Kansas City-Saint Joseph
- Mark Edward Brennan, appointed Auxiliary Bishop of Baltimore in 2016 and later Bishop of Wheeling-Charleston
- William D. Byrne, appointed Bishop of Springfield in Massachusetts in 2020

== Education ==
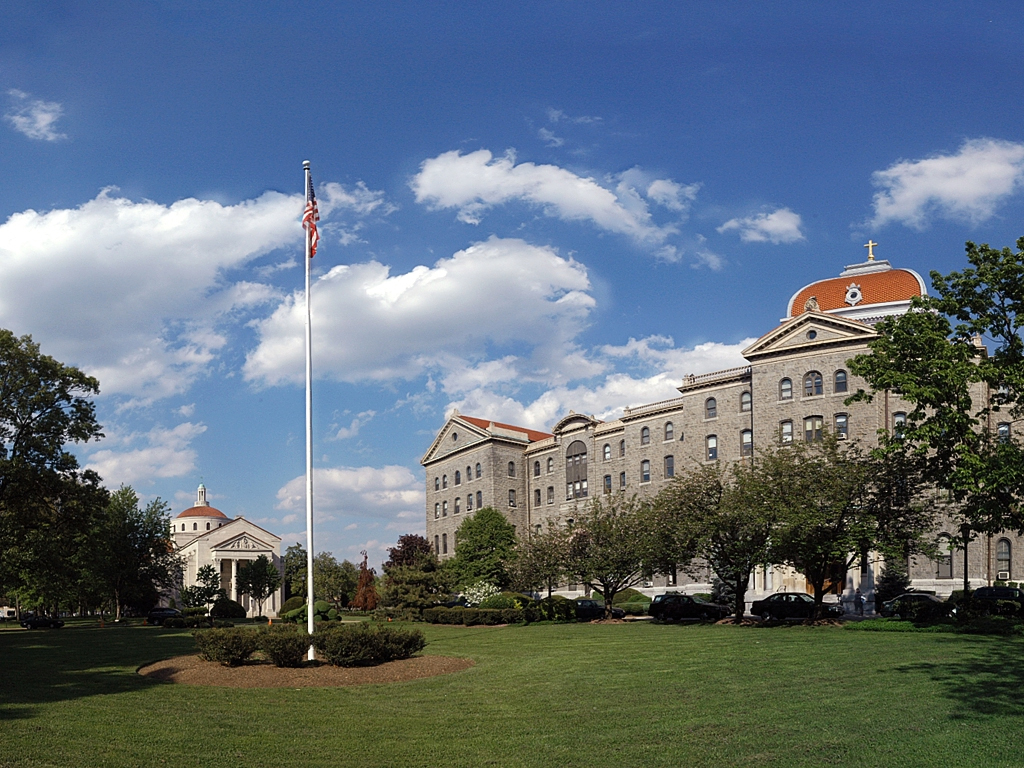
Trinity Washington University (2008)

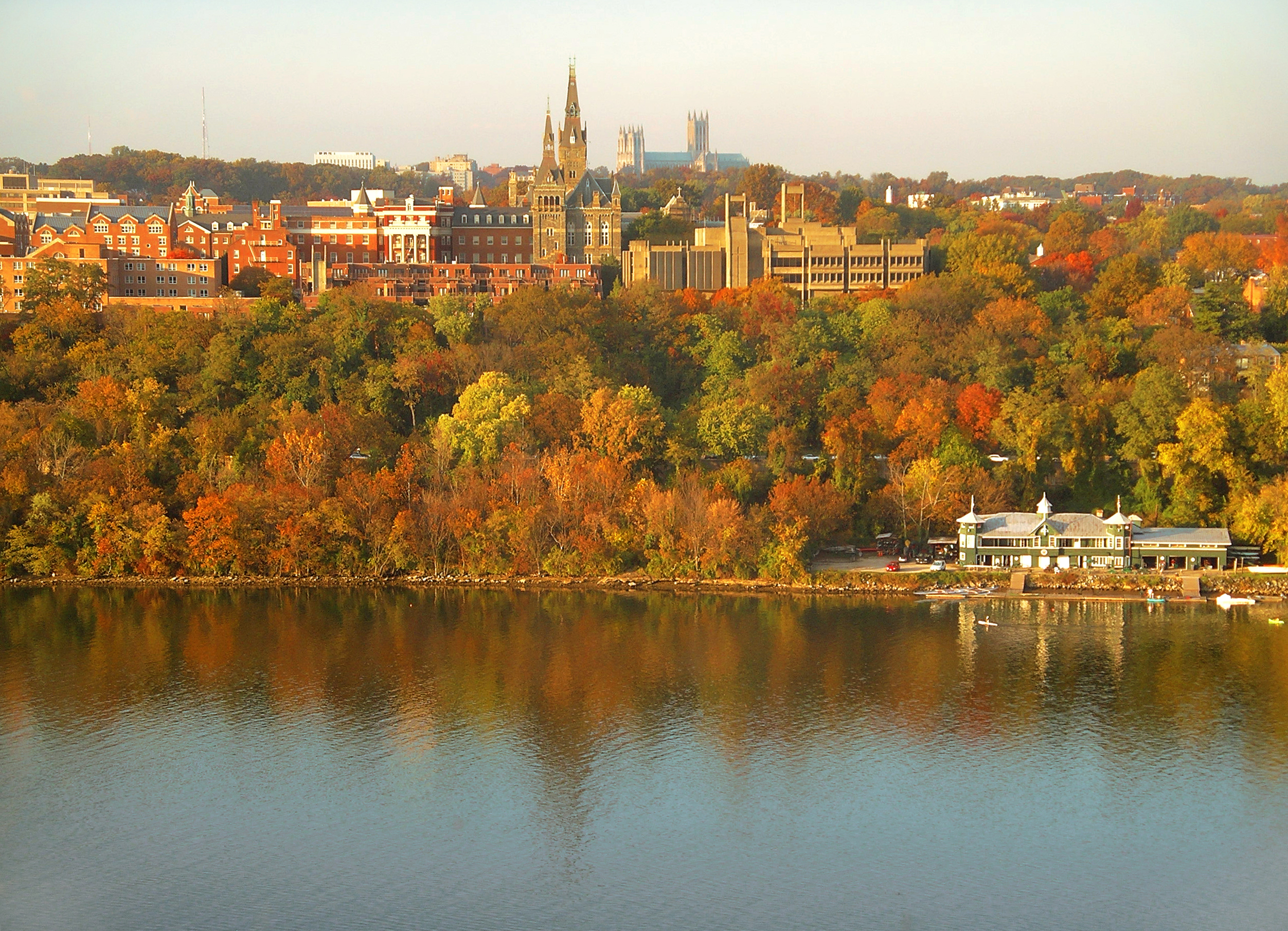
Georgetown University (2005)

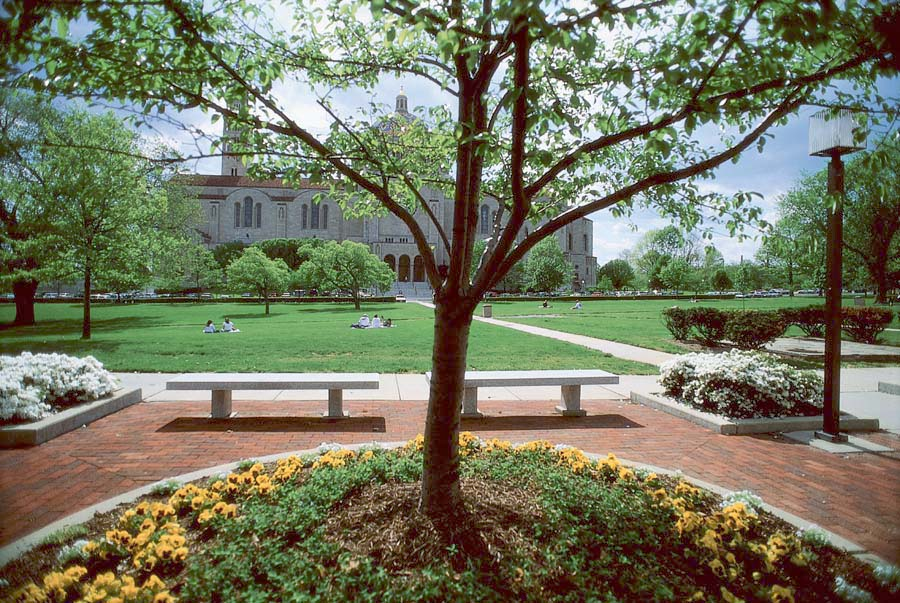
Catholic University of America (2006)

The Archdiocese of Washington centralized its school administration as part of its Center City Consortium, established in 1997.

=== High schools in Maryland ===
- Academy of the Holy Cross – Kensington
- Avalon School – Wheaton
- Bishop McNamara High School – Forestville
- Brookewood School – Kensington
- Connelly School of the Holy Child – Potomac
- DeMatha Catholic High School – Hyattsville
- Don Bosco Cristo Rey High School – Takoma Park
- Elizabeth Seton High School – Bladensburg
- Georgetown Preparatory School – North Bethesda
- Heights School – Potomac (under jurisdiction of the Prelature of Opus Dei)
- Our Lady of Good Counsel High School – Olney
- St. Mary's Ryken– Leonardtown
- St. Vincent Pallotti High School – Laurel
- Stone Ridge School of the Sacred Heart – Bethesda

=== High schools in the District of Columbia ===
- Archbishop Carroll High School
- Georgetown Visitation Preparatory School
- Gonzaga College High School
- St. Anselm's Abbey School
- St. John's College High School

=== Colleges and universities ===
- Catholic University of America
- Georgetown University
- Trinity Washington University

=== Seminaries ===
- Redemptoris Mater Seminary
- St. John Paul II Seminary
- Theological College (Catholic University)
- Dominican House of Studies

== Carroll Publishing Company ==
Carroll Publishing Company is a 501(c)(3) corporation owned by the archdiocese and tasked with publishing the two official weekly newspapers of the archdiocese, the Catholic Standard and, in Spanish, El Pregonero. The company was formed and incorporated in 1954. Under the direction of the late Cardinal James A. Hickey, archbishop of Washington, Carroll assumed control of El Pregonero in 1985. In addition to its two weekly newspapers, the company also publishes a four-page newspaper for Catholic elementary school children, called Junior Saints, which is issued monthly throughout the school year.

== Cemeteries ==
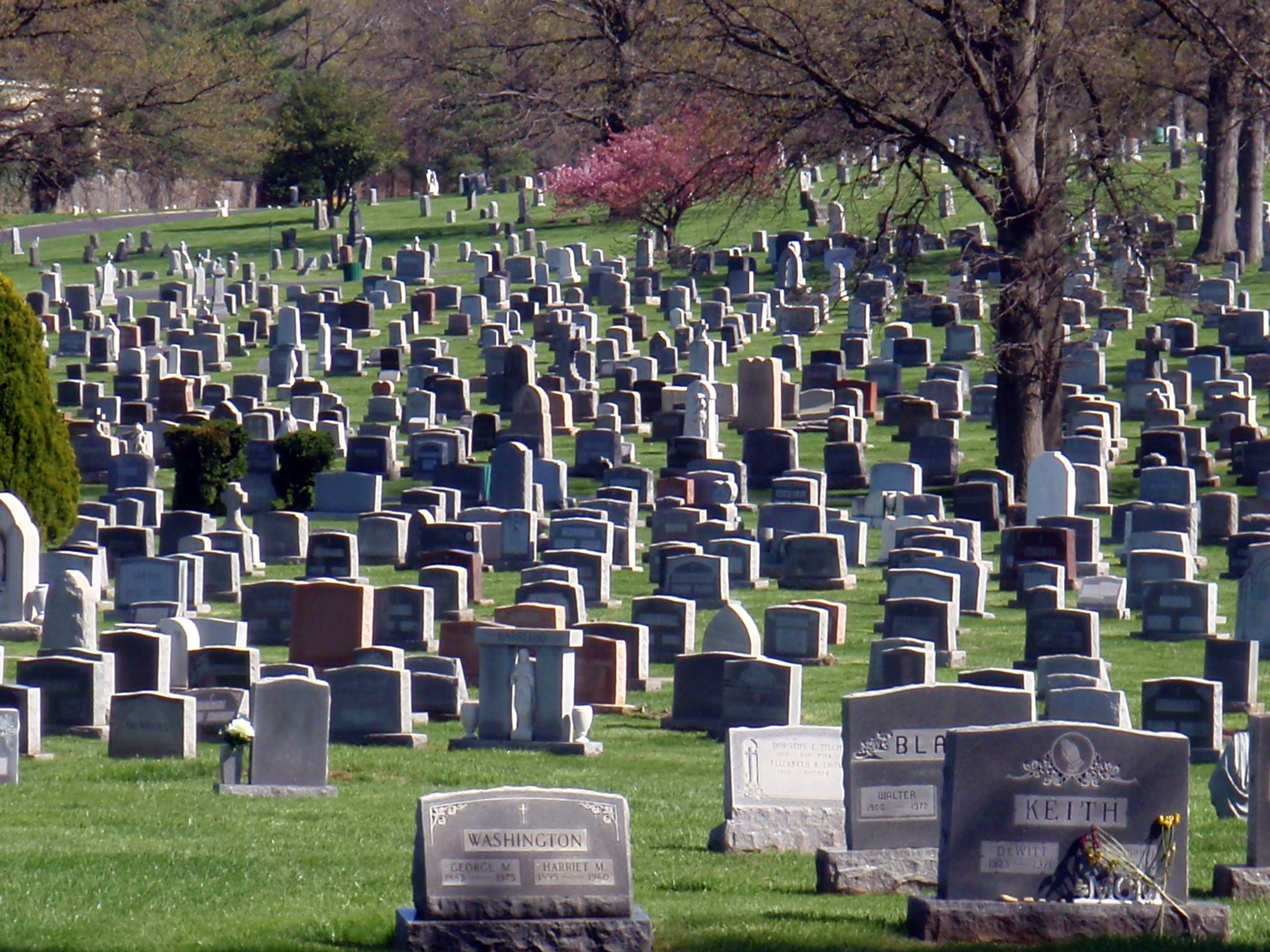
Mount Olivet Cemetery, Washington D.C. (2009)

In addition to the nearly four dozen of its parishes which have their own cemeteries, the archdiocese owns and operates five major cemeteries.

== Province of Washington ==
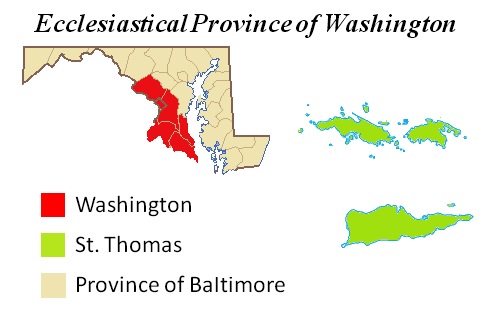
Ecclesiastical Province of Washington map

- Diocese of Saint Thomas
