= Cathedral of St. Matthew the Apostle =

Catholic cathedral in Washington, DC, US

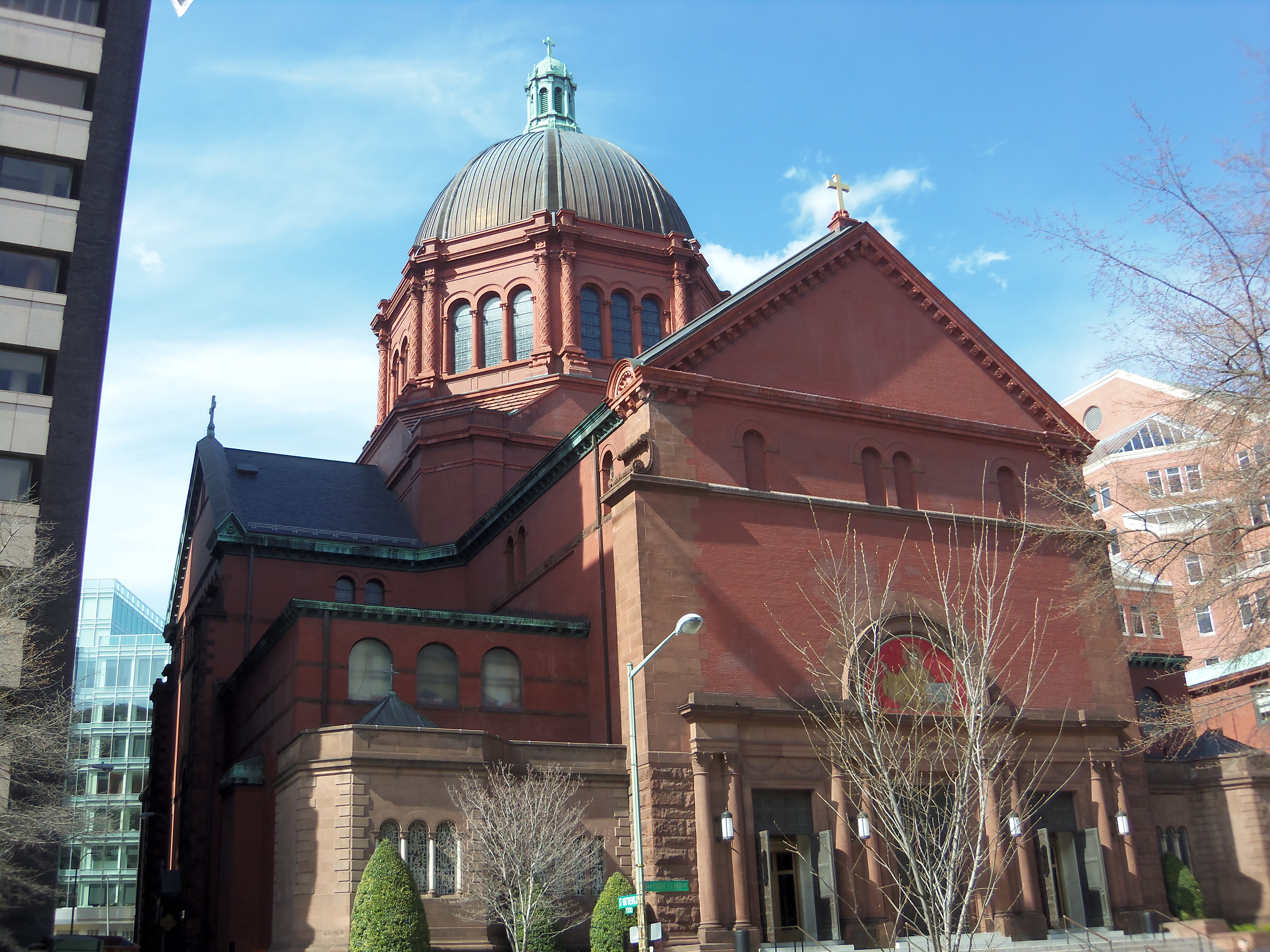
- Cathedral of St. Matthew the Apostle in Washington, D.C. in April 2013

- Location within Central Washington, D.C.
- 38°54′22″N 77°2′24″W
- Location: 1725 Rhode Island Avenue NW; Washington, D.C., U.S.
- Country: United States
- Denomination: Catholic Church
- Website: stmatthewscathedral.org

History
- Founded: 1840, 186 years ago
- Dedication: Saint Matthew

Architecture
- Architect: C. Grant La Farge
- Style: Renaissance Revival; Romanesque Revival
- Completed: 1913

Specifications
- Capacity: 1,200
- Length: 155 feet (47 m)
- Width: 136 feet (41 m)
- Height: 200 feet (61 m)

Administration
- Archdiocese: Washington

Clergy
- Archbishop: Robert W. McElroy
- Rector: Msgr. W. Ronald Jameson
- St. Matthew's Cathedral and Rectory
- U.S. National Register of Historic Places
- U.S. Historic district – Contributing property
- Part of: Dupont Circle Historic District (ID78003056)
- NRHP reference No.: 74002173
- Added to NRHP: January 24, 1974

The Cathedral of St. Matthew the Apostle in Washington, D.C., is a Catholic cathedral, most commonly known as St. Matthew's Cathedral. It is the seat of the archbishop of the Archdiocese of Washington. As St. Matthew's Cathedral and Rectory, it has been listed on the National Register of Historic Places since 1974.

The cathedral is located in downtown Washington at 1725 Rhode Island Avenue NW between Connecticut Avenue and 17th Street. It is seven blocks north and two blocks west of the White House.

== History ==
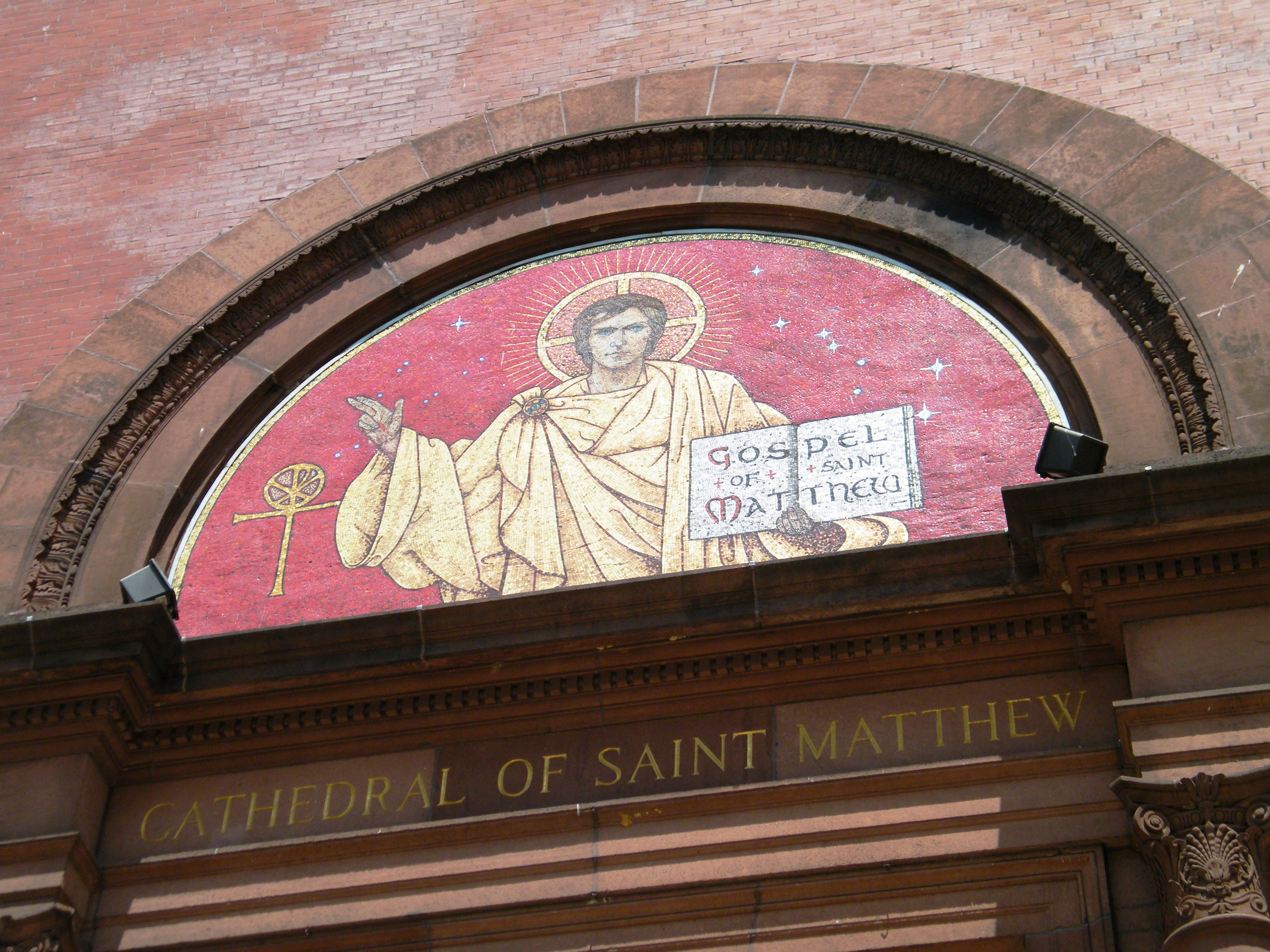
Mosaic, Saint Matthew's Cathedral (2011)

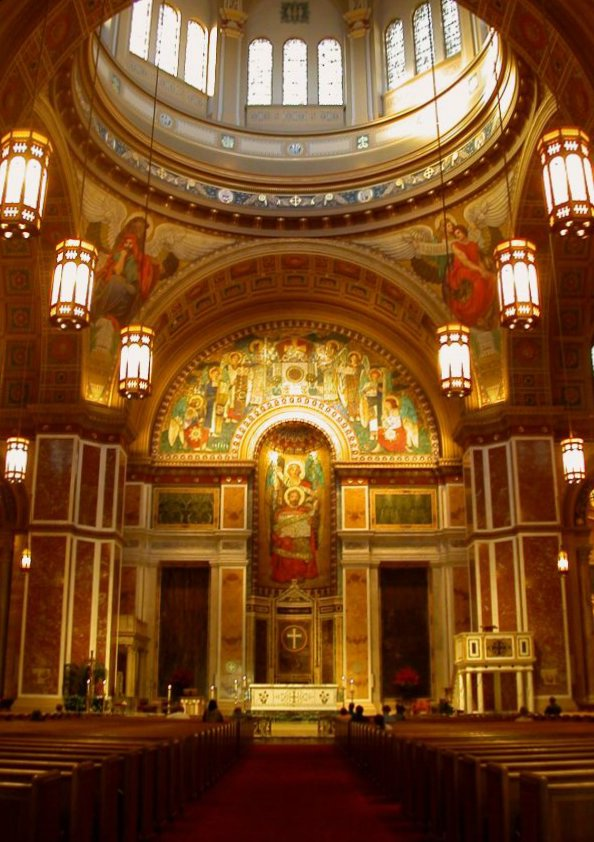
Nave, St. Matthew's Cathedral (2005)

=== 1840 to 1900 ===
During the 19th century and part of the 20th century, Washington D.C. was part of the Archdiocese of Baltimore. As the city continued to grow, Archbishop Samuel Eccleston allowed Reverend William Matthews and parochial vicar Reverend John Philip Donelan to erect St. Matthew's Parish in that city. It was named after Matthew the Apostle, who was the patron saint of civil servants. The first St. Matthew's Church was constructed at 15th and H Streets. While not yet completed, the church was dedicated on November 1, 1840.

By 1890, the first St. Matthew's Church was no longer adequate for the needs of the parish. Monsignor Thomas Sim Lee in 1892 purchased a property on Rhode Island Avenue, NW, for a new church. He hired the architect Christopher Grant LaFarge, who had worked on the design of the Episcopal Cathedral of St. John the Divine in New York City. The parish accepted LaFarge's design in 1893 and the cornerstone for the new church was laid later that year. The first Mass in the new St. Matthew's Church was celebrated on June 2, 1895.

=== 1900 to 2000 ===
The dome was installed in 1913 and the church was dedicated later that year.

In 1939, Pope Pius XII suppressed the Archdiocese of Baltimore and erected the Archdiocese of Baltimore-Washington. He designated St. Matthew's as a co-cathedral, with the same status as the Cathedral Basilica of the Assumption in Baltimore, Maryland. Eight years later, Pius XII erected a separate Archdiocese of Washington, with Saint Matthew's as the sole cathedral.

The first notable Requiem Mass offered at St. Matthew's was for Manuel L. Quezon, the President of the American-held Commonwealth of the Philippines, who died August 1, 1944 in Saranac Lake, New York. Quezon had been in the United States leading the government in-exile after the country was occupied by the Empire of Japan during World War II. He was interred temporarily at Arlington National Cemetery in Arlington, Virginia, and after the war's end in 1945, his remains were flown home to lie in his memorial.

In 1957, a solemn Requiem Mass was offered at the cathedral for U.S. Senator Joseph McCarthy. In attendance were 70 senators and hundreds of clergymen, filling the cathedral to capacity.

The cathedral drew worldwide attention following the assassination of U.S. President John F. Kennedy on November 22, 1963, in Dallas, Texas. Cardinal Richard Cushing, Archbishop of Boston and a Kennedy family friend, offered a said, (not sung) pontifical Requiem low mass during his state funeral at St. Matthew's. This was followed by a funeral procession to Arlington National Cemetery. An inscription in the floor of the nave marks the occasion.

Mother Teresa visited the cathedral in 1974. The Russian artist Leonid Bodnia later created a statue of her and a homeless man, which was placed inside the cathedral. Pope John Paul II celebrated Mass in the cathedral in 1979, his visit commemorated with a bust by the American sculptor Gordon Kray.

=== 2000 to present ===
In 2000, the archdiocese undertook a full restoration of St. Matthew's Cathedral. On the exterior, the contractors replaced rotten wood and eroded copper under the dome, adding a new protective membrane. Broken or missing slates were replaced on the roof and the facade and window frames were all repaired.

For the interior of the cathedral, the mosaics and murals were all cleaned and restored as needed. Structural support issues in the ceiling were addressed and water damage was repaired. The electrical system was updated and new lighting installed.

Pope Francis, on a 2015 papal visit to Washington, presided over a midday prayer service at the cathedral. In 2020, at the start of the COVID-19 pandemic, the cathedral hosted an archdiocesan Easter Mass via livestream. The Mass was celebrated by Archbishop Wilton Gregory with no worshippers in the cathedral due to COVID-19 restrictions.

Prior to the 2021 inauguration of Vice President Joe Biden as the 46th President of the United States he attended Mass at St. Matthews. He was joined by Senate Majority Leader Mitch McConnell, Senate Minority Leader Chuck Schumer, Speaker of the House of Representatives Nancy Pelosi and House Minority Leader Kevin McCarthy.

In August 2024, a Requiem Mass was held at the cathedral for Ethel Kennedy, a human rights advocate and the widow of Attorney General Robert F. Kennedy. It was attended by Joe Biden, as well as former presidents Barack Obama and Bill Clinton.

In October 2025, a man was arrested outside of St. Matthew's on charges of processing a Molotov cocktail and making threats to injure or kidnap people. The cathedral staff had previously obtained a trespass order barring the individual from the cathedral grounds.

== Architecture ==
=== Exterior ===
Designed by architect C. Grant La Farge, St. Matthew's Cathedral is in the shape of a Latin cross measuring 155 ft × 136 ft (47 m × 41 m). It has a seating capacity of approximately 1,200. The building is constructed of red brick with sandstone and terra cotta trim. It is in the Romanesque Revival style with Byzantine elements. The cathedral is capped by an octagonal dome that extends 190 ft (58 m) above the nave. The dome is capped by a cupola and crucifix that bring the building height to 200 ft (61 m).

=== Interior ===
The interior of the cathedral is decorated in marble and semiprecious stones. It has a 35 ft (11 m) mosaic of St. Matthew behind the main altar that was created by the American painter Edwin Blashfield. Both structural and decorative elements underwent extensive restoration between 2000 and September 21, 2003, the feast day of St. Matthew.

Near the entry of the St. Francis Chapel is a burial crypt with eight tombs intended for Washington's archbishops. Three former archbishops, Cardinal Patrick O’Boyle, Cardinal William Baum, and Cardinal James Hickey, are interred there.

== Events ==
=== Red Mass ===
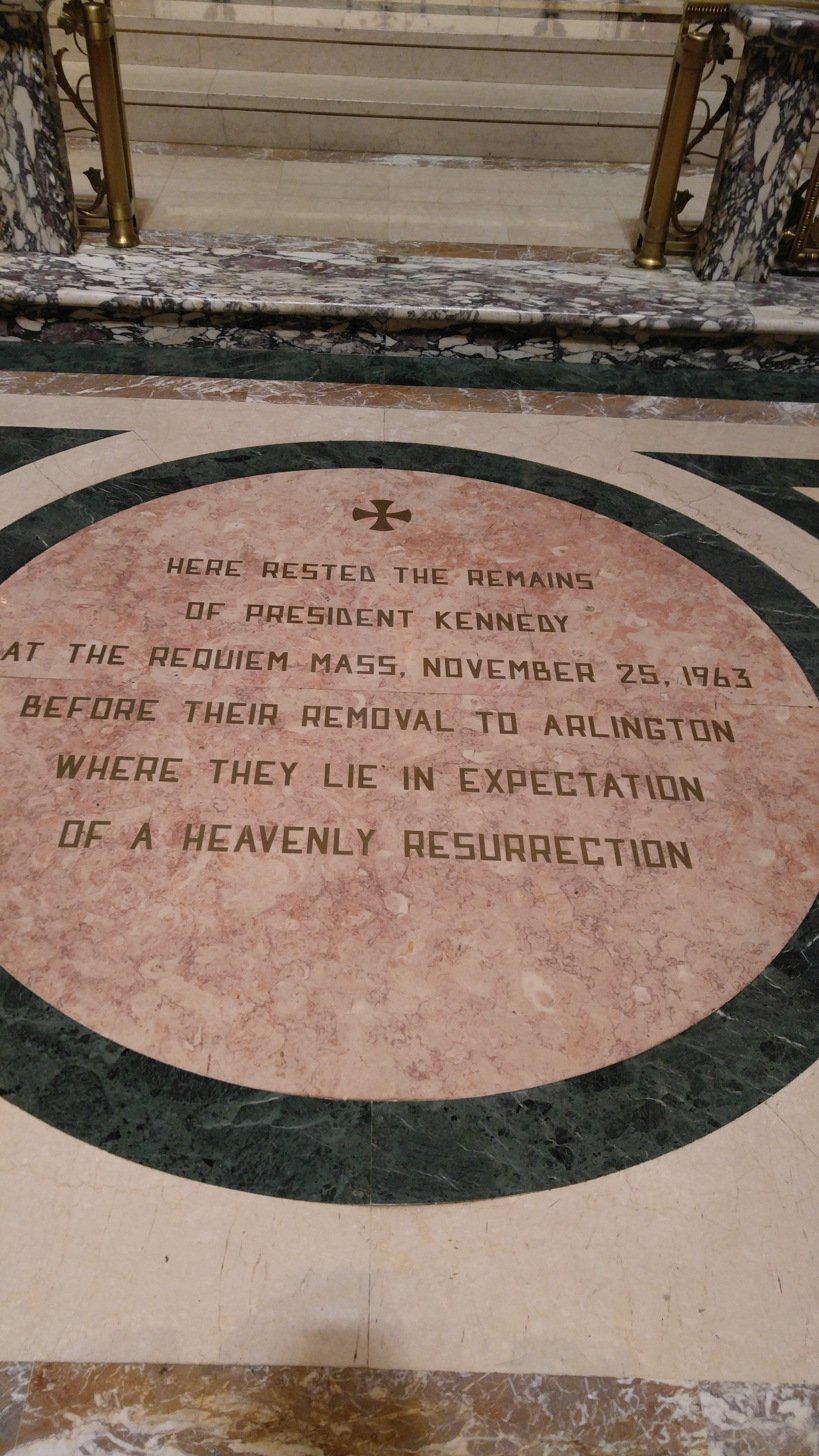
Marker near the sanctuary commemorating where President Kennedy's casket was placed for his Requiem Mass, 2016

St. Matthew's celebrates one of the most famous Red Masses in the world annually on the day before the Supreme Court of the United States begins its term. The Mass is normally attended by Supreme Court justices, along with members of Congress, Cabinet secretaries, and other dignitaries.

President Dwight D. Eisenhower in 1954 became the first sitting U.S. president to attend the Red Mass at St. Matthew's. President Harry Truman had attended the Mass nine years earlier, but as Vice President.

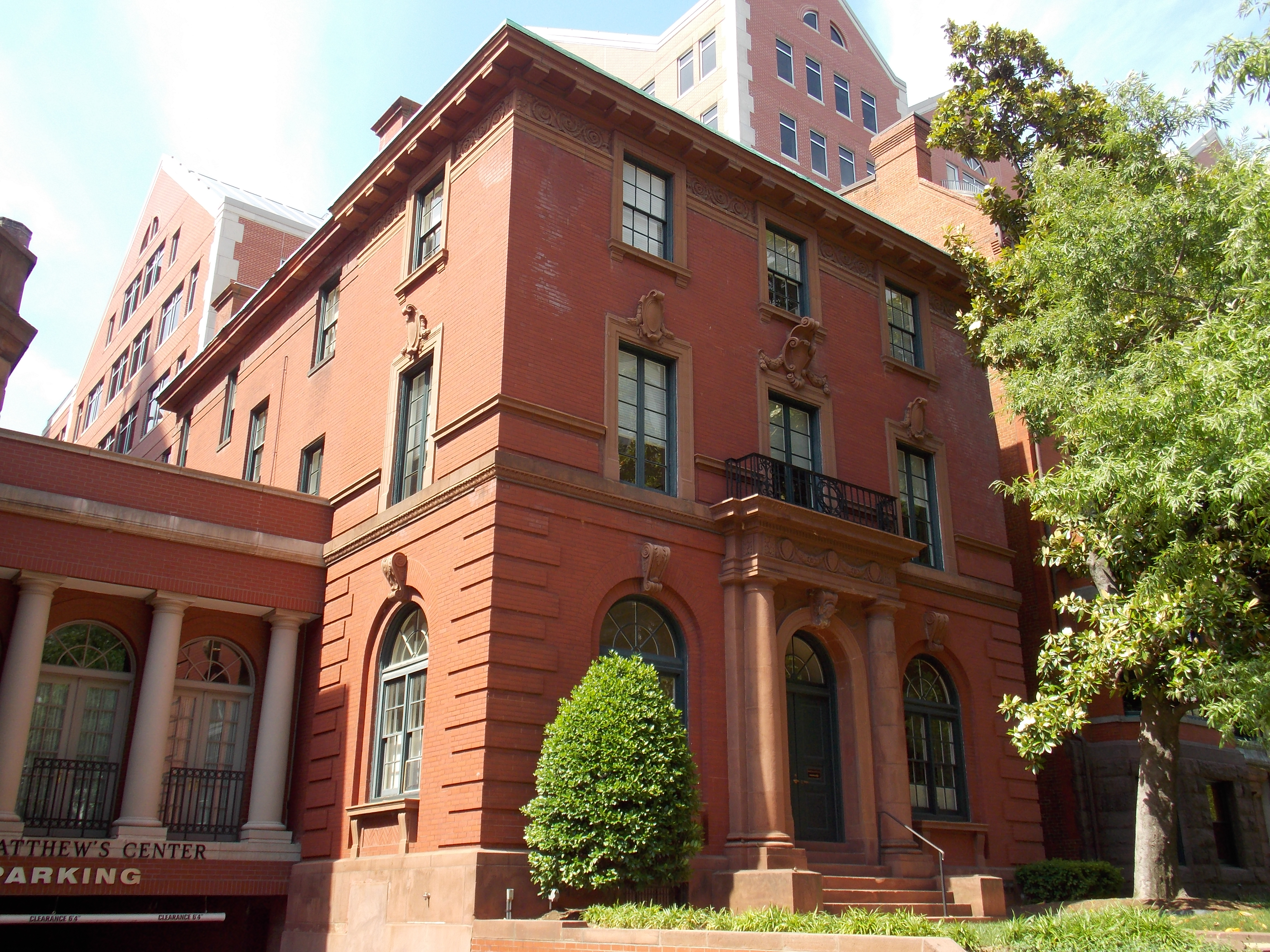
Rectory, St. Matthew's Cathedral (2014)

== See also ==
- List of Catholic cathedrals in the United States
- List of cathedrals in the United States
