= St. Stanislaus College =

St. Stanislaus College may refer to:

Africa

- St. Stanislaus College (Guyana), a senior secondary school in Georgetown

Australia

- St Stanislaus' College (Bathurst), a Catholic day and boarding high school for boys in New South Wales
- St. Stanislaus College, a predecessor of Emmaus College, Rockhampton in Park Avenue, Queensland

Europe

- Beaumont College, formerly St. Stanislaus College, a public school in Old Windsor, England
- St Stanislaus College or Tullabeg College, a school in County Offaly, Ireland from 1818 to 1886
- St Stanislas College, Delft, (Dutch, Stanislascollege) a conglomerate of high schools in Delft, Pijnacker, and Rijswijk
- Collège Saint-Stanislas, Mons, Belgium

India

- St. Stanislaus High School, founded in 1863 as an orphanage and now a Catholic day and boarding school for boys located in Mumbai

United States

- Pio Nono College (Georgia), a college in Macon, known as St. Stanislaus College from 1883 until closure in 1920
- Saint Stanislaus College, a Catholic day and boarding middle school and high school for boys in Bay St. Louis, Mississippi
- St. Stanislaus College (Chicago), a catholic high school in Chicago, Illinois
