= Gregory John Hartmayer =

American prelate of the Catholic Church

His Excellency, The Most Reverend Gregory John Hartmayer OFM Conv.
- Archbishop of Atlanta
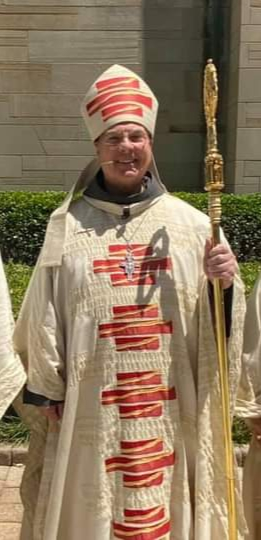
- Hartmayer in 2022
- Church: Catholic
- See: Atlanta
- Appointed: March 5, 2020
- Installed: May 6, 2020
- Predecessor: Wilton Daniel Gregory
- Previous posts: Bishop of Savannah (2011-2020)

Orders
- Ordination: May 5, 1979 by Howard James Hubbard
- Consecration: October 18, 2011 by Wilton Daniel Gregory, J. Kevin Boland, and Luis Rafael Zarama

Personal details
- Born: November 21, 1951 (age 74) Buffalo, New York, United States
- Parents: John W. & Sally Hartmayer
- Education: St. Hyacinth College and Seminary (B.A.); St. Anthony-on-Hudson Seminary (M.Div.); Emmanuel College (M.A.); Boston College (M.Ed.)
- Motto: Pax et bonum (Latin for 'Peace and good')

Styles of Gregory John Hartmayer
- Reference style: His Excellency; The Most Reverend
- Spoken style: Your Excellency
- Religious style: Archbishop

Gregory John Hartmayer, O.F.M. Conv. (born November 21, 1951) is an American Catholic prelate who has served as Archbishop of Atlanta since 2020. From 2011 to 2020, Hartmayer served as Bishop of Savannah. He is a member of the Order of Friars Minor Conventual.

== Biography ==
=== Early life ===
Gregory Hartmayer was born on November 21, 1951, in Buffalo, New York, one of four children of John and Sally Hartmayer. He has two brothers and a sister. He was raised in Tonawanda, New York, attending St. Amelia School in that town. Hartmayer graduated from Cardinal O'Hara High School in Tonawanda in 1969.

After graduating from high school, Hartmayer joined the Order of Friars Minor Conventual at the St. Joseph Cupertino Friary in Ellicott City, Maryland. He took his simple vows on August 15, 1970, and made solemn profession on August 15, 1973. Hartmayer studied at St. Hyacinth College and Seminary in Granby, Massachusetts, where he obtained a Bachelor of Arts in philosophy degree in 1974.

From 1974 to 1975, Hartmeyer taught at Archbishop Curley High School in Baltimore, Maryland. He returned to New York to study at St. Anthony-on-Hudson Seminary in Rensselaer, New York, receiving a Master of Divinity degree in 1979.

=== Ordination and ministry ===
Hartmayer was ordained to the priesthood at the Cathedral of the Immaculate Conception in Albany, New York, for the Conventual Franciscans by Bishop Howard J. Hubbard on May 5, 1979. The Franciscans then assigned Hartmayer to Archbishop Curley High School, where he served as a guidance counselor and teacher (1979 to 1985) and as principal (1985 to 1988). In 1980, Hartmayer earned a Master of Arts degree in pastoral counseling from Emmanuel College in Boston.

The Franciscans in 1988 transferred Hartmeyer back to Tonawanda to serve as principal of Cardinal O'Hara High School. After one year there, he became principal of St. Francis High School in Athol Springs, New York in 1989. Hartmayer received a Master of Education degree in secondary Catholic school administration from Boston College in 1992.

Following a three-month sabbatical at St. Patrick Seminary in Menlo Park, California, Hartmayer briefly served as an instructor at John Carroll Catholic High School in Fort Pierce, Florida, in 1995. In August of that year, the Franciscans assigned Hartmeyer as pastor of St. Philip Benizi Parish in Jonesboro, Georgia. He became pastor of St. John Vianney Parish in Lithia Springs, Georgia, in July 2010.

=== Bishop of Savannah ===
Hartmayer's coat of arms as bishop of Savannah

On July 19, 2011, Pope Benedict XVI appointed Hartmayer as bishop of Savannah. His episcopal consecration took place on October 18, 2011, at the Cathedral of St. John the Baptist in Savannah, Georgia. His principal consecrator was Archbishop Wilton Gregory, with Bishops J. Kevin Boland and Luis Zarama as co-consecrators. In November 2018, Hartmayer released a list of 16 clergy from the diocese with credible accusations of sexual abuse of minors.

While serving in Savannah, Hartmayer administered the renovations of two parish schools and the construction of three new churches, one new parish, and one new high school.Hartmayer was appointed to the board of directors of the National Catholic Educational Association in 2019. He was appointed chair of the board in 2024.

=== Archbishop of Atlanta ===
Hartmayer was installed as archbishop of Atlanta on May 6, 2020, in the Cathedral of Christ the King in Atlanta. The ceremony was held behind closed doors, with only a few attendees due to the COVID-19 pandemic. Church journalist Rocco Palmo stated that Hartmayer was Gregory's "chosen successor."

When the Satanic Temple of Atlanta scheduled a black mass in that city in October 2024, Hartmayer announced possible legal action if the organizers planned to use consecrated host in the ceremony. However, they assured the archdiocese that they did not have any sacramental bread, nor were they planning to obtain any.

Hartmayer, in November 2024, announced the launch of a LGBTQ+ Pastoral Affairs Commission to create a dialogue with the LGBTQ+ community. He remarked,

I pray that through the creation of this commission we will all come to a better understanding of and respect for each other...After all, we are all children of God, brothers and sisters on this journey.

Hartmayer is a member of the US Conference of Catholic Bishops (USCCB) Committee on Communications and the Committee on National Collections and chair of the Subcommittee on the Catholic Communication Campaign.

== Viewpoints ==
=== Gun violence ===
In August 2025, Hartmayer commented on the mass shooting at Annunciation Catholic School in Minneapolis, Minnesota, that killed two children and injured 17 children and adults,

Our children should be safe in our homes, schools, and churches. As I have said as Archbishop of Atlanta, and repeat as chairman of the governing board for the National Catholic Educational Association, we must find a way to pass reasonable firearms legislation. We must take action to protect all children and families from violence. We cannot expect schools to become fortresses. We have to do more to protect our precious communities.

=== Immigration ===
In June 2020, Hartmayer expressed his approval of the US Supreme Court decision that prevented the Trump Administration from terminating the Deferred Action for Childhood Arrivals (DACA) program for the children of undocumented immigrants.

=== Racism ===
In November 2021, Hartmeyer commented on the conviction of three white men in the murder of Ahmaud Arbery, an African-American man, in Glynn County, Georgia.

=== War ===
In 2023, Hartmayer participated in a ceremony with Jewish and Muslim religious leaders to commemorate the dead from the conflicts in Israel, Gaza and Ukraine.

Catholic Church titles
| Preceded by Wilton Daniel Gregory | Archbishop of Atlanta; 2020–present | Succeeded by Incumbent |
| Preceded by J. Kevin Boland | Bishop of Savannah; 2011–2020 | Succeeded by Stephen D. Parkes |
