= Thomas Dubay =

American Catholic priest (1921 – 2010)

Personal life
- Born: Thomas Edward Dubay; 30 December 1921 Minneapolis, Minnesota
- Died: 26 September 2010 (aged 88) Silver Spring, Maryland

Religious life
- Religion: Catholic
- Institute: Society of Mary
- Ordination: 1950 June 8 by Michael Joseph Keyes

Father Thomas Edward Dubay (December 30, 1921 – September 26, 2010), S.M., was an American Catholic priest, author, and retreat director. He wrote over 20 books on Catholic spirituality, in which he emphasized the importance of renewed conversion and contemplative prayer, and he traveled worldwide to teach at parishes, seminaries, and monasteries.

== Early life and education ==
Dubay was born on December 30, 1921, in Minneapolis, Minnesota, one of seven children. His father, Elie Albert Dubay, was also born in Minneapolis, while his mother, Leah Caron Dubay, was born in Superior, Wisconsin. He attended DeLaSalle High School, a Minneapolis school run by the Christian Brothers and graduated in 1939. That year, he began his post-secondary education at St. Mary's Manor, the minor seminary of the Society of Mary (Marists), in South Langhorne, Pennsylvania.

After two years at St. Mary's Manor, Dubay entered the Marist novitiate in Staten Island, and took first vows after one year, on September 8, 1944. He then began his priestly formation at the Marist College in Washington, DC, and was ordained on June 8, 1950, by Bishop Michael Joseph Keyes, S.M.

His first assignment as a priest was to remain in Washington, DC, for postgraduate study at The Catholic University of America. He earned a master's degree in 1951, and six years later, in 1957, he would be awarded a doctorate in education from the same Catholic University. His dissertation was titled: “A Philosophical Study of the State as Educator.”

== Teaching at Catholic institutions ==
In 1952, Dubay became a seminary professor and a spiritual director at Notre Dame Seminary in New Orleans, Louisiana. He then began teaching at the Marist College in Washington, DC, while completing his doctoral work at The Catholic University of America, before returning to the faculty of Notre Dame Seminary for eleven more years.

Over the next ten years, Dubay served at a number of Catholic institutions. In 1967 he moved to Bettendorf, Iowa, where he taught at the Marist seminary located in the Joseph F. Bettendorf House. In 1968 he moved to Burlingame, California, where he had been invited to teach with the Sisters of Mercy at Russell College. After two years, he joined the faculty at Chestnut Hill College in Philadelphia, Pennsylvania. Then, in 1973, he moved back to Washington, DC, to continue teaching at the Marist seminary. During this latter assignment Dubay was able to concentrate on his religious writing.

== Itinerant ministry ==
Starting in 1977, at the recommendation of his provincial superior, Dubay began traveling frequently to assist religious communities respond to teachings of the Second Vatican Council. He worked with many groups of religious sisters in renewing their constitutions. During this period, he began to answer invitations to speak and lead retreats throughout the world, including at parishes, seminaries, cloistered monasteries, lay associations, religious orders, hermitages, and even prisons. He formed close relationships with a number of religious communities, including the convents of the Missionaries of Charity, Carmelite sisters, Dominican sisters, Passionist Sisters, and the Sisters of Life.

Dubay also began ministering through television and radio appearances. In 1988, he first appeared on EWTN Global Catholic Network as a guest on Mother Angelica Live. Dubay visited on EWTN at Irondale, Alabama at least once a year for over 20 years to record various series on topics including contemplative prayer, community life, and St. John of the Cross. He also spoke on various Catholic radio programs, including WEWN.

== Later life and death ==
In 2008, Dubay was diagnosed as having early stages of bladder cancer. He began chemotherapy and radiotherapy, which after several months successfully induced remission. He was forced, however, to cancel all of his travel engagements, some of which had planned for several years. He chose to remain with the Marist community in Washington, DC, and began to serve local parishes and high schools with spiritual direction, counseling, and lecturing.

In 2009 he was moved to a nearby nursing center run by the Little Sisters of the Poor in Washington, DC. In early September 2010, in order to receive onsite dialysis, he was moved to a nursing care center in Silver Spring, Maryland. He was taken to Holy Cross Hospital on September 25, and died the following day. He was buried on October 7 in Washington, DC.

A Facebook group advocating that a cause for canonization be initiated was formed June 20, 2022.

== Personal life ==
Dubay was known for his scientific curiosity. He would read the monthly publications of Discover and National Geographic cover to cover. His 1999 book, The Evidential Power of Beauty: Science and Theology Meet, describes the wonder, symmetry, and intricacy revealed by science.

== Selected works ==
- Philosophy Of The State As Educator (1959) reissued (2013)
- Ecclesial Women: Towards A Theology Of The Religious State (1970)
- God Dwells Within Us (1971)
- Caring: A Biblical Theology Of Community (1973)
- Pilgrims Pray (1974)
- Happy Are You Poor: The Simple Life and Spiritual Freedom (1981)
- Faith and Certitude (1985)
- And You Are Christ's: The Charism of Virginity and the Celibate Life (1987)
- Fire Within: St. Teresa of Avila, St. John of the Cross, and Gospel, on Prayer (1989)
- Seeking Spiritual Direction: How to Grow the Divine Life Within (1993)
- Authenticity: A Biblical Theology Of Discernment (1977)
- The Evidential Power of Beauty (1999)
- Prayer Primer: Igniting A Fire Within (2002)
- Deep Conversion, Deep Prayer (2006)
- Saints: A Closer Look (2007)
