= St. Michael's Catholic Church (Tybee Island, Georgia) =

Coordinates: 32°00′13.1″N 80°50′42.4″W

- St. Michael's Catholic Church
- Location: 802 Lovell Ave, Tybee Island, GA 31328
- Country: United States
- Denomination: Catholic
- Website: www.saintmichaelstybee.org

History
- Dedicated: July 5, 1891

Architecture
- Functional status: active
- Construction cost: $2,000

Specifications
- Capacity: 275 people

St. Michael's Catholic Church is a local Catholic church in Tybee Island, Georgia, which is situated in the Roman Catholic Diocese of Savannah.

== History ==
St. Michael's was built in 1891 under the direction Bishop Thomas A. Becker, and with the assistance of Vicar General Edward D. Cafferty, and Reverend W.A. McCarthy. Its opening garnered about 200 congregants to the church, which "filled the little church with overflowing."

The church ran a parochial school, also called St. Michael's, in Tybee Island from 1941 to 2010. The school is now a public school called the Tybee Island Maritime Academy.

== Ministries ==
Several ministries are run by St. Michael's, including a music ministry run by its music director Ryan Beke.
