= Pio Nono =

Pio Nono may refer to:

== People ==
- Pope Pius IX

== Educational institutions ==
- Pio Nono College (Georgia) a former college (1876-1920) in Macon, Georgia
- Pio Nono College (Wisconsin) a former college in St. Francis, Wisconsin
  - Pio Nono High School, the former secondary school component of the college in Wisconsin

== Other ==
- Pionono, a sweet pastry
