= Raymond W. Lessard =

Catholic bishop

His Excellency, The Most Reverend Raymond William Lessard
- Bishop of Savannah
- Church: Roman Catholic Church
- See: Diocese of Savannah
- Predecessor: Gerard Louis Frey
- Successor: John Kevin Boland

Orders
- Ordination: December 16, 1956 by Martin John O’Connor
- Consecration: April 27, 1973 by Thomas Donnellan

Personal details
- Born: December 21, 1930 Grafton, North Dakota, US
- Died: January 3, 2016 (aged 85) Boynton Beach, Florida, US
- Education: St. Paul Seminary
- Motto: To add joy to our faith

Styles of Raymond Lessard
- Reference style: The Most Reverend
- Spoken style: Your Excellency
- Religious style: Bishop
- Posthumous style: not applicable

Raymond William Lessard (December 21, 1930 – January 3, 2016) was an American prelate of the Roman Catholic Church. He served as the 12th bishop of the Diocese of Savannah in Georgia from 1973 to 1995.

== Biography ==
=== Early life ===
Raymond Lessard was born on December 21, 1930, in Grafton, North Dakota, US to a largely French-Canadian family. Lessard was raised on a farm and educated at St. Aloysius Academy in Oakwood, North Dakota. He then attended St. Paul Seminary in St. Paul, Minnesota.

=== Priesthood ===
Lessard was ordained to the priesthood at the chapel of the Pontifical North American College by Archbishop Martin O’Connor on December 16, 1956, for the Diocese of Fargo. Lessard later worked at the Vatican in Rome, both during and after the Second Vatican Council (1962–1965) as an official of the Consistorial Congregation.

=== Bishop of Savannah ===
On March 5, 1973, Lessard was appointed the twelfth Bishop of Savannah by Pope Paul VI. He received his episcopal consecration on April 27, 1973, at the Cathedral of St. John the Baptist in Savannah from Archbishop Thomas Donnellan, with Bishops Justin Driscoll and Francis Gossman serving as co-consecrators.

Lessard once served as liaison between Catholic bishops and married Episcopalian clergy seeking Catholic ordination. He once described racism as "the paramount social problem affecting our area". Within the United States Conference of Catholic Bishops, Lessard chaired the Committee for Pastoral Research and Practices.

=== Retirement and legacy ===
Due to his chronic back problems, Lessard submitted his resignation as bishop of the Diocese of Savannah to Pope John Paul II. The pope accepted it on February 7, 1995. Lessard then became a professor at St. Vincent de Paul Regional Seminary in Boynton Beach, Florida, where he taught ecclesiology. Raymond Lessard died at his home, on January 3, 2016, at St. Vincent de Paul.

== Sex abuse scandal and cover-up ==
In October, 2009, the Diocese of Savannah paid $4.24 million to settle a lawsuit that alleged Lessard allowed Reverend Wayland Brown to practice ministry in the diocese when Lessard knew that Brown was a serial child molester.

== See also ==
- Catholic Church hierarchy
- Catholic Church in the United States
- Historical list of the Catholic bishops of the United States
- List of Catholic bishops of the United States
- Lists of patriarchs, archbishops, and bishops

Catholic Church titles
Preceded by –	Bishop Emeritus of Savannah; 1995–Present	Succeeded by –
Preceded by Gerard Louis Frey	Bishop of Savannah; 1973–1995	Succeeded by John Kevin Boland
