= St. Vincent's Academy =

Private, Catholic, all-girls high school in Savannah, Georgia, United States

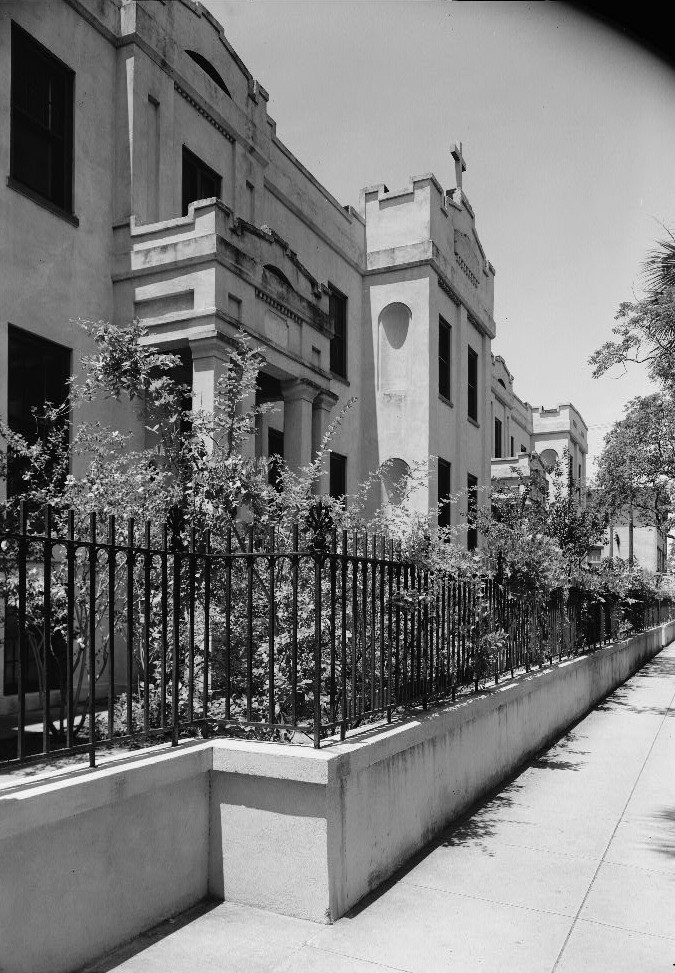

Location
- 207 East Liberty Street; Savannah, Georgia 31401; United States; 32°4′26″N 81°5′28″W

Information
- Type: Private
- Motto: Women Who Lead
- Religious affiliation: Roman Catholic
- Established: 1845 (181 years ago)
- Sister school: Benedictine Military School
- CEEB code: 112695
- President: Mary Anne Hogan
- Principal: Dawn Odom
- Faculty: 34
- Grades: 9-12
- Gender: Girls
- Enrollment: 326 (2020-21)
- Colors: Blue, gold
- Athletics conference: GHSA
- Nickname: Saints
- Accreditation: Southern Association of Colleges and Schools
- Newspaper: Pleiades
- Affiliation: National Catholic Educational Association
- Website: www.svaga.net

St. Vincent's Academy (SVA) is a private, Catholic, all-girls high school located next to the Cathedral of St. John the Baptist in downtown Savannah, Georgia, United States. Founded in 1845 when Father Jeremiah Francis O’Neill brought six Sisters of Our Lady of Mercy from Charleston, South Carolina, the school operates within the Roman Catholic Diocese of Savannah and enrolls about 350 girls in grades 9-12.

== Notable alumni ==
Name	Class year	Notability	References
Jeff Davis		son of Confederate President Jefferson Davis	
Varina Anne Davis		daughter of Confederate President Jefferson Davis	

The early history of St. Vincent's is intertwined with that of Savannah and the South. During the Civil War, eight-year-old Maggie Davis, whose father Jefferson Davis was President of the Confederate States of America, became a student at St. Vincent's. Her brother also came to the convent daily to recite his lessons.

== Notable faculty ==
- Sister Mary Melanie Holliday, Catholic nun and schoolteacher

== See also ==
- National Catholic Educational Association
