= J. Kevin Boland =

Irish-born retired Roman Catholic Bishop of Savannah

His Excellency, The Most Reverend John Kevin Boland
- Bishop Emeritus of Savannah
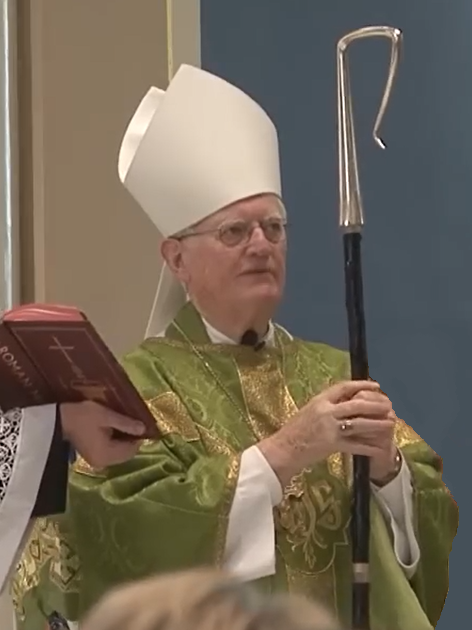
- Bishop Boland in 2015
- Diocese: Savannah
- Appointed: February 7, 1995
- Installed: April 18, 1995
- Retired: July 19, 2011
- Predecessor: Raymond W. Lessard
- Successor: Gregory John Hartmayer

Orders
- Ordination: June 14, 1959 by John Charles McQuaid
- Consecration: April 18, 1995 by John Francis Donoghue, Raymond W. Lessard, and Raymond James Boland

Personal details
- Born: April 25, 1935 (age 91) Monkstown, County Cork, Ireland
- Education: Christian Brothers College, Cork; All Hallows College; Catholic University of America; Pontifical North American College; Fordham University
- Motto: Christus in corde (Christ in the heart)

Styles of John Kevin Boland
- Reference style: His Excellency; The Most Reverend
- Spoken style: Your Excellency
- Religious style: Bishop

John Kevin Boland (born April 25, 1935) is an Irish-born American Catholic prelate who served as bishop of Savannah in Georgia from 1995 to 2011.

== Biography ==
=== Early life ===
John Boland was born in Monkstown, County Cork, Ireland on April 25, 1935, to John Joseph and Gertrude O’Brien. His brother, Raymond Boland, served as bishop of the Diocese of Kansas City-Saint Joseph in Missouri. John Boland attended Christian Brothers College in Cork and All Hallows Seminary in Dublin, Ireland.

=== Priesthood ===
On June 14, 1959, Boland was ordained to the priesthood for the Diocese of Savannah by Archbishop John McQuaid at All Hallows Seminary. In September 1959, Boland arrived in Georgia; the diocese assigned him as assistant pastor at St. Mary on the Hill Parish in Augusta. In 1961, he was posted as associate pastor at the Cathedral of St. John the Baptist Parish in Savannah, remaining there until 1962. While serving at the cathedral, Boland started working on a master's degree, attending the Catholic University of America in Washington D.C. during the summers of 1962, 1963 and 1964.

Boland was appointed pastor in 1967 of St. Michael Parish in Tybee Island, Georgia, staying there until 1968. In 1970, the bishop named him rector of the Cathedral of St. John the Baptist in Savannah. Boland was transferred in 1972 to Blessed Sacrament Parish in Savannah. In 1974, Boland went to Rome to attend the continuing education program of the Pontifical North American College. In 1983, Boland was appointed pastor of St. Anne Parish in Columbus, Georgia. While serving in Columbus, he finished his master's degree at Fordham University in New York City in 1989.

=== Bishop of Savannah ===
Cathedral of St. John the Baptist, Savannah, Georgia (2017)

On February 7, 1995, Pope John Paul II appointed Boland as bishop of Savannah. His episcopal ordination by Archbishop John Donoghue took place on April 18, 1995, at the Cathedral of St. John the Baptist in Savannah. His principal consecrator was Archbishop John Francis Donoghue

In the United States Conference of Catholic Bishops (USCCB), Boland was a member of the Pastoral Practices Committee, the Region IV representative to the USCCB Administrative Committee and a member of the USCCB Communications Committee. In November 2001, he was named chair of the Committee on Marriage and Family Life. In November 2002, Boland became a member of the USCCB Budget and Finance Committee.

Boland was a board member of the All Hallows Missionary College Fund in Ireland and the Southeast Pastoral Institute in Miami, Florida. He served as a trustee for Catholic Mutual Group, a church-run insurance company.

In 2003, Boland wrote a letter to the Chicago Province of the Society of Jesus, expressing concerns about Reverend Donald J. McGuire. McGuire was a Jesuit priest who organized youth retreats in Georgia. Boland was forwarding the complaints of a Georgia couple whose son had attended one retreat. The boy told his parents that McGuire had shown him pornography and shared a bed with him. In 2006, McGuire was convicted of child sexual abuse and sentenced to 25 years in prison.

Boland in October 2009 was briefly hospitalized for an episode of transient global amnesia in Savannah while performing a wedding mass. In November 2009, Boland agreed to a $4.24 million financial settlement by the diocese with Allan Ranta, a victim of sexual abuse by Reverend Wayland Y. Brown. Boland released this statement:

I am sorry for all the pain and suffering experienced by Mr. Ranta and my prayers go out not only to him, but to all victims of child sexual abuse that each may find the healing they seek.

=== Retirement and legacy ===
Boland reached the mandatory retirement age of 75 on April 25, 2010, and submitted his resignation to Pope Benedict XVI. It was accepted by the pope on July 19, 2011.

Catholic Church titles
Preceded by –	Bishop Emeritus of Savannah; 2011–present	Succeeded by –
Preceded by Raymond W. Lessard	Bishop of Savannah; 1995–2011	Succeeded by Gregory John Hartmayer
