= Gerald O'Hara =

American Catholic prelate

His Excellency, The Most Reverend Gerald Patrick Aloysius O'Hara
- Archbishop (personal title); Apostolic Delegate to Great Britain
- Church: Catholic Church
- Appointed: June 7, 1954
- Term ended: July 16, 1963
- Predecessor: William Godfrey
- Successor: Igino Eugenio Cardinale
- Other post: Titular Archbishop of Pessinus (1959‍–‍1963)
- Previous posts: Auxiliary Bishop of Philadelphia (1929‍–‍1935); Bishop of Savannah (1935‍–‍1959); Papal Regent to Romania (1947‍–‍1950); Apostolic Nuncio to Ireland (1951‍–‍1954)

Orders
- Ordination: April 3, 1920 by Basilio Pompili
- Consecration: May 21, 1929 by Dennis Joseph Dougherty

Personal details
- Born: May 4, 1895 Scranton, Pennsylvania, U.S.
- Died: July 16, 1963 (aged 68) London, England
- Education: St. Charles Borromeo Seminary; Pontifical Roman Seminary; Pontifical Roman Athenaeum Saint Apollinare
- Motto: Vitam impendere Christo (To hand over life to Christ)

Styles of Gerald O'Hara
- Reference style: The Most Reverend
- Spoken style: Your Excellency
- Religious style: Monsignor
- Posthumous style: The Late

Gerald Patrick Aloysius O'Hara (May 4, 1895 – July 16, 1963) was an American prelate of the Catholic Church. He served as an auxiliary bishop in the Archdiocese of Philadelphia (1929–1935), as bishop of the Diocese of Savannah in Georgia (1935–1959), as papal regent to Romania (1947–1950), apostolic nuncio to Ireland (1951–1954), and as apostolic delegate to Great Britain (1954–1963).

== Biography ==
=== Early life and education ===
Gerald O'Hara was born on May 4, 1895, in the Green Ridge section of Scranton, Pennsylvania, to Patrick James and Margaret (née Carney) O'Hara; both of whom were of Irish descent. His father was a dentist. He attended Our Mother of Sorrows School and St. Joseph's College High School, both in Philadelphia, Pennsylvania. From 1911 to 1918, O'Hara studied at St. Charles Borromeo Seminary in Philadelphia He then entered the Pontifical Roman Seminary in Rome, obtaining a Doctor of Divinity degree in 1921.

=== Ordination and ministry ===
O'Hara was ordained to the priesthood for the Archdiocese of Philadelphia by Cardinal Basilio Pompili in Rome on April 3, 1920. He earned a doctorate in canon and civil law from the Pontifical Roman Athenaeum Saint Apollinare in 1924. He spent several years studying abroad, traveling through Europe and the Middle East. Following his return to Pennsylvania in 1926, O'Hara became private secretary to Cardinal Dennis Dougherty, the archbishop of Philadelphia. O'Hara also served as a judge on the archdiocesan matrimonial court.

=== Auxiliary Bishop of Philadelphia ===
On April 26, 1929, O'Hara was appointed as an auxiliary bishop of the Archdiocese of Philadelphia and titular bishop of Heliopolis in Phoenicia by Pope Pius XI. He received his episcopal consecration on May 21, 1929, from Cardinal Dougherty, with Bishops John MacGinley and Thomas O'Reilly serving as co-consecrators, at the Cathedral Basilica of Saints Peter and Paul in Philadelphia.

In addition to his episcopal duties, O'Hara served as pastor of the Nativity B.V.M. Parish in Port Richmond, Philadelphia, and as vicar general of the archdiocese. O'Hara also was president of the American Catholic Historical Association from 1934 to 1936.

=== Bishop of Savannah ===
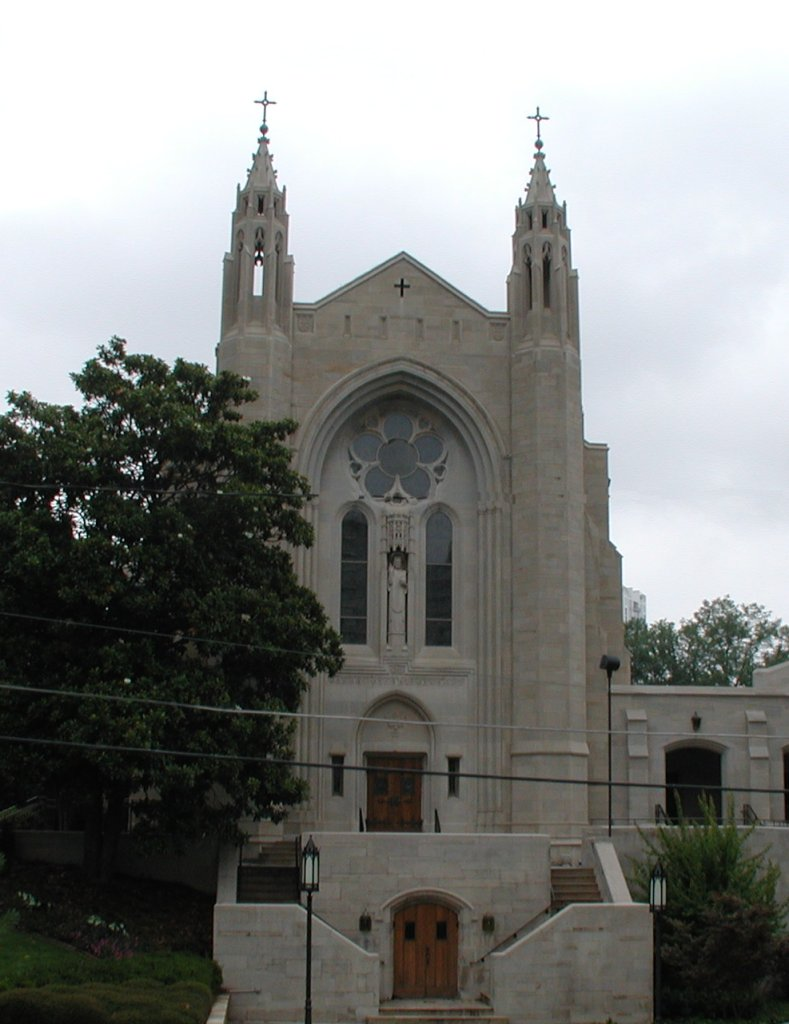
Cathedral of Christ the King, Atlanta, Georgia

On November 26, 1935, O'Hara was appointed the ninth bishop of Savannah by Pius XI, succeeding Bishop Michael Keyes. In 1936, the diocese was renamed as the Diocese of Savannah-Atlanta. With the creation of the separate Diocese of Atlanta in 1956, the Diocese of Savannah regained its original name.

During his tenure, O'Hara erected the Cathedral of Christ the King in Atlanta, which was dedicated by in January 1939. The cathedral was built on the former site of Ku Klux Klan gatherings, and O'Hara even invited Imperial Wizard Hiram Evans to the dedication. O'Hara once criticized the Savannah Press after the newspaper ran a whimsical St. Patrick's Day editorial repeating an old story about Saint Patrick. He allegedly granted upper class women in Ireland to court men during leap years.

O'Hara was considered a leader in church efforts to improve race relations, launching a seven-point social and racial program in the 1930s, calling for aid to African American children and heightened awareness of rural issues.

=== Papal Representative to Romania ===
Romanian coat of arms (1952 to 1965)

In addition to his role as diocesan bishop, O'Hara was named regent of the apostolic nunciature to the Kingdom of Romania in Bucharest, on February 19, 1947. During this period, His vicar general and chancellor assumed the active administration of the Diocese of Savannah.

During his three years in Romania, O'Hara repeatedly denounced the Romanian Communist government (the communist regime was created after the 1947 Romanian coup d'etat) for its persecution of Latin Catholics and Greek Catholics. On July 4, 1950, in a meeting at the Romanian foreign ministry, government officials accused O'Hara of spying for the United States, the United Kingdom and Turkey. O'Hara's Romanian chauffeur, on trial for espionage, had previously implicated O'Hara and other staff members. O'Hara later said the chauffeur had been tortured and forced to lie. The meeting at the foreign ministry ended with the government expelling O'Hara that same day.

On returning to New York City, O'Hara denied the Romanian allegations, calling them "lies from first to last". O'Hara accused the Romanian Government of terrorism, insisting, "Our interest was solely the welfare of 3,000,000 Catholic people in Romania."

=== Apostolic Nuncio to Ireland ===
On July 12, 1950, O'Hara was granted the personal title of Archbishop by Pope Pius XII. O'Hara was appointed Apostolic Nuncio to Ireland on November 27, 1951.

In 1953, Paul Blanshard, author and critic of the Catholic Church, petitioned the U.S. Department of State to revoke O'Hara's American citizenship, accusing O'Hara of violating the 1950 McCarran Internal Security Act by serving as an agent of a foreign power, namely the Holy See. The State Department dismissed the petition.

=== Apostolic Delegate to Great Britain ===
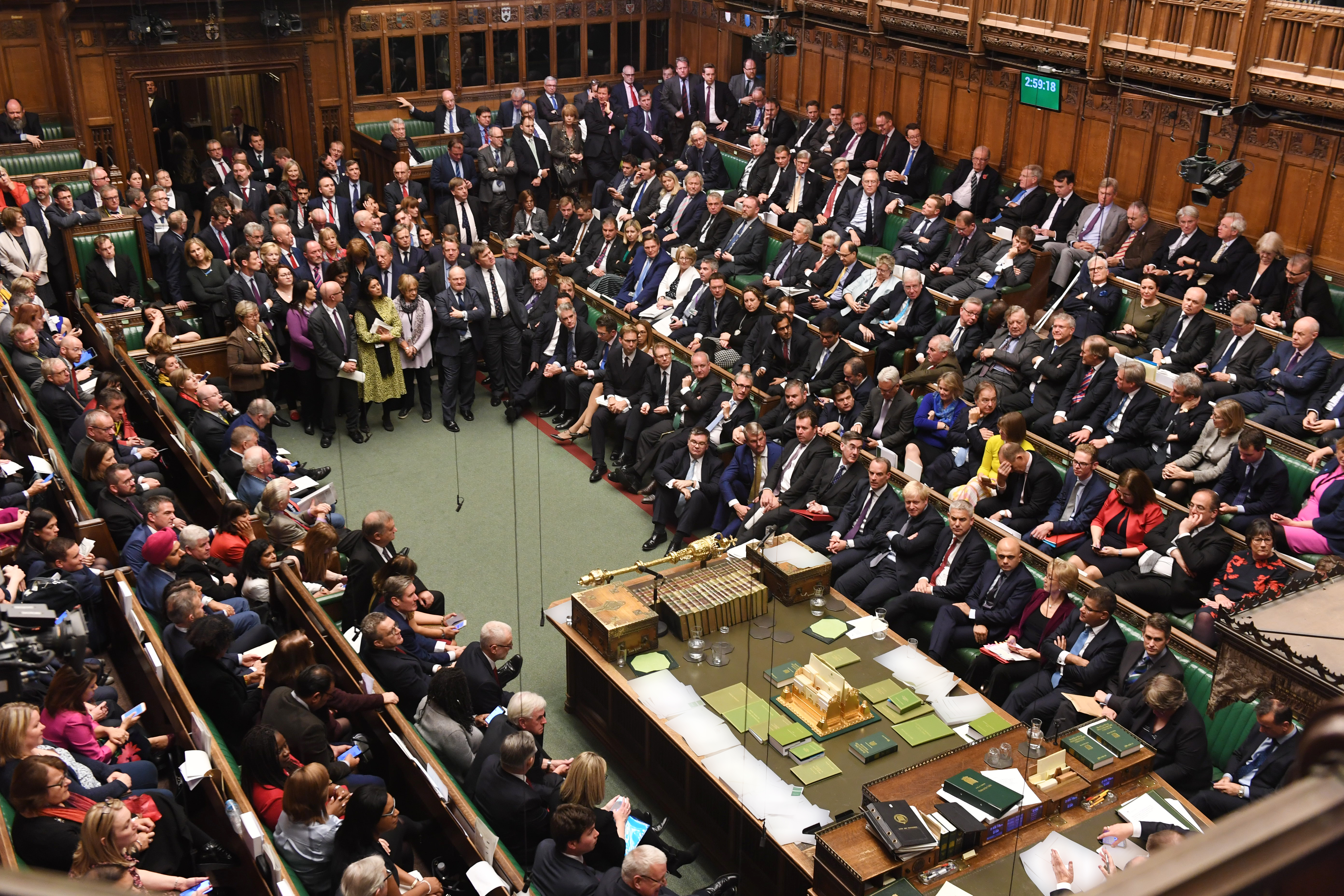
British House of Commons, 2019

On June 8, 1954, O'Hara was named apostolic delegate to Great Britain. As apostolic delegate, his jurisdiction also included Malta, Gibraltar, and Bermuda. In May 1958, O'Hara was admitted to St. Anthony at Cheam Hospital in London with a severe case of bronchial pneumonia after returning to the United Kingdom from a foreign trip.

Drained by his dual duties as Papal diplomat and diocesan bishop, O'Hara resigned as Bishop of Savannah on November 12, 1959; he was named titular archbishop of Pessinus by Pope St. John XXIII on the same date. In 1960, O'Hara became the first Papal representative to visit the British Houses of Parliament in more than 400 years.

=== Death and legacy ===
Gerald O'Hara died on July 16, 1963, from a heart attack at his residence in the Wimbledon section of London, aged 68. His requiem mass was celebrated by Archbishop John Heenan at Westminster Cathedral in London. His body was then flown back to Philadelphia, where he is buried in the crypt of the Cathedral of Saints Peter and Paul.

Catholic Church titles
Preceded by –	Auxiliary Bishop of Philadelphia; 1929–1935	Succeeded by –
Preceded by Michael Joseph Keyes	Bishop of Savannah; 1935–1959	Succeeded by Thomas Joseph McDonough
Preceded by Ettore Felici	Apostolic Nuncio to Ireland; 1951–1954	Succeeded by Albert Levame
Preceded by William Godfrey	Apostolic Delegate to Great Britain; 1954—1963	Succeeded by Igino Eugenio Cardinale
