= Stephen D. Parkes =

American prelate of the Catholic Church (born 1965)

His Excellency, The Most Reverend Stephen Douglas Parkes
- Bishop of Savannah
- Diocese: Savannah
- Appointed: July 8, 2020
- Installed: September 23, 2020
- Predecessor: Gregory John Hartmayer

Orders
- Ordination: May 23, 1998 by Norbert Dorsey
- Consecration: September 23, 2020 by Gregory John Hartmayer, Gregory Parkes, and John Gerard Noonan

Personal details
- Born: June 2, 1965 (age 61) Mineola, New York, US
- Education: University of South Florida; St. Vincent de Paul Regional Seminary
- Motto: Gaudete in Domino semper (Rejoice in the Lord always)

Styles of Stephen Douglas Parkes
- Reference style: His Excellency; The Most Reverend
- Spoken style: Your Excellency
- Religious style: Bishop

Stephen Douglas Parkes (born June 2, 1965) is an American Catholic prelate who has served as Bishop of Savannah in Georgia since 2020.

== Early life and education ==
Stephen D. Parkes was born in Mineola, New York, on June 2, 1965. He is the youngest of three sons born to Joan and Ron Parkes. His older brother, Gregory Parkes, is the bishop of the Diocese of St. Petersburg in Florida. They are currently the only siblings concurrently serving as bishops and one of only 11 sibling-bishops in the history of the Catholic Church in the United States.

Stephen Parkes attended Massapequa High School in Massapequa, New York. He earned a Bachelor of Business Administration/Marketing degree from the University of South Florida in Tampa, Florida, in 1987, then worked in banking and the retail sector for several years.

In 1992, having decided to become a priest, Parkes entered the St. Vincent de Paul Regional Seminary in Boynton Beach, Florida, receiving a Master of Divinity degree. Parkes is fluent in Spanish, having studied it in high school, college, and seminary, plus during a six-week language immersion course in Costa Rica.

== Priesthood ==
On May 23, 1998, Parkes was ordained by Bishop Norbert Dorsey to the priesthood for the Diocese of Orlando at Saint James Cathedral in Orlando. After his ordination, the diocese assigned Parkes as parochial vicar to Annunciation Parish in Altamonte Springs, Florida. In 2004, he was also named spiritual director for the Catholic campus ministry at the University of Central Florida in Orlando.

Parkes's first appointment as pastor was in 2005 at Most Precious Blood Parish in Oviedo, Florida. Bishop Thomas Wenski appointed Parkes as dean of the North Central Deanery for the diocese in 2008. The next year, the diocese returned Parkes to Annunciation Parish, where he served as pastor for the next nine years.

During his time in Orlando, Parkes was also a member of the Investment Committee and, starting in 2019, a spiritual director to the Catholic Foundation of Central Florida.

== Bishop of Savannah ==
Cathedral Basilica of St. John the Baptist, Savannah, Georgia (2017)

On July 8, 2020, Pope Francis appointed Parkes as bishop of Savannah. On September 23, 2020, he was consecrated by Archbishop Gregory Hartmayer, with his brother Gregory and Noonan as co-consecrators, at the Cathedral Basilica of St. John the Baptist in Savannah.

In September 2020, Stephen Parkes and the diocese were sued by William Fred Baker Jr. Baker said that the diocese knew that Reverend Wayland Brown was molesting him in 1987 and 1988 when he was a 10-year-old attending St. James Catholic School in Savannah. Brown received a 20-year sentence for sexual abuse crimes.

In May 2022, Parkes contacted the Vatican Dicastery for Divine Worship and the Discipline of the Sacraments, requesting permission to continue the Traditional Latin Mass in the diocese. The Discastery granted the dispensation for one year, and then extended it to two more years in September 2023.

After the Prosecuting Attorneys' Council (PAC) of Georgia in March 2023 released its report on sexual abuse by clergy, Parkes made the following statement:

The sexual abuse crisis has been a blight on the Church and a source of profound suffering. While the sins of the past cannot be overlooked – and indeed must be acknowledged – I assure you that the Church of today is firmly committed to the safety and protection of children.

Within the US Conference of Catholic Bishops, Parkes is a member of the Committee on Pro Life Activities and the Subcommittee on Native American Affairs. He is a board member for Ave Maria University in Immokalee, Florida, St. Vincent de Paul Seminary in Boynton Beach, Florida and Cross Catholic Outreach, an international relief organization.

== See also ==
- Catholic Church hierarchy
- Catholic Church in the United States
- Historical list of the Catholic bishops of the United States
- List of Catholic bishops of the United States
- Lists of patriarchs, archbishops, and bishops

Catholic Church titles
| Preceded by Gregory John Hartmayer | Bishop of Savannah; 2020–present | Succeeded by Incumbent |
