= Benjamin Joseph Keiley =

American Catholic bishop (1847–1925)

The Right Reverend Benjamin Joseph Keiley
- Bishop of Savannah
- Church: Catholic Church
- See: Diocese of Savannah
- In office: June 3, 1900 – March 18, 1922
- Predecessor: Thomas Albert Andrew Becker
- Successor: Michael Joseph Keyes

Orders
- Ordination: December 31, 1873
- Consecration: June 3, 1900 by James Gibbons

Personal details
- Born: October 13, 1847 Petersburg, Virginia, USA
- Died: June 17, 1925 (aged 77) Atlanta, Georgia, USA
- Education: St. Charles College; North American College

Benjamin Joseph Keiley (October 13, 1847 – June 17, 1925) was an American prelate of the Catholic Church. He served as bishop of the Diocese of Savannah in Georgia from 1900 to 1922.

== Biography ==
=== Early life and education ===
Benjamin Keiley was born on October 13, 1847, in Petersburg, Virginia, to John D. and Margaret (née Crowley) Keiley, both natives of Cork County, Ireland. His older brother, Anthony Michael Keiley, served as chief justice of the International Court of Appeals in Cairo, Egypt. An educator, John Keiley converted to Methodism when the children were young. As a result, Margaret Keiley moved away with the children so as to raise them as Catholics.

After receiving his early education in Petersburg, Benjamin Keiley at age 17 joined the Confederate Army of Northern Virginia in 1864 during the American Civil War. He served in an artillery unit during the last year of the war.

When the war ended, Keiley worked as a law clerk before attending St. Charles College, a minor seminary for the Archdiocese of Baltimore in Ellicott City, Maryland. He then travelled to Rome to attend the Pontifical North American College in 1869.

=== Ordination and ministry ===
Upon his return to the United States, Keiley was ordained to the priesthood by Cardinal James Gibbons for the Diocese of Wilmington on December 31, 1873. Keiley then served as pastor of St. Peter's Parish in New Castle, Delaware, until 1880, when he became rector of the pro-cathedral at Wilmington.

When Bishop Thomas A. Becker was appointed bishop of Savannah in 1886, Keiley asked the Vatican to be incardinated, or transferred, to the same diocese. He served as vicar general and pastor of Immaculate Conception Parish in Atlanta until 1896. He was rector of the Cathedral of St. John the Baptist in Savannah from 1896 to 1900.

=== Bishop of Savannah ===
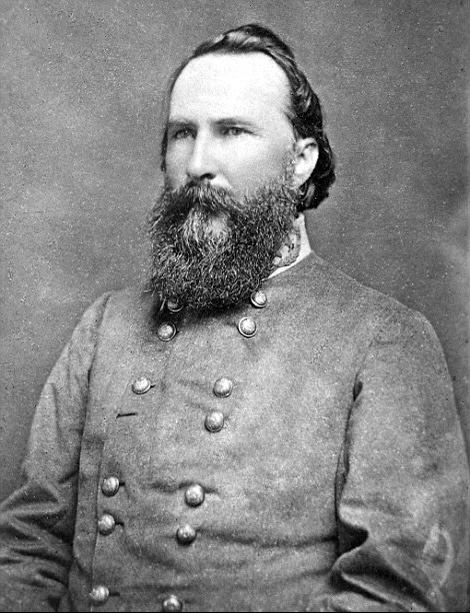
Confederate General James Longstreet (pre-1914)

On April 2, 1900, Keiley was appointed by Pope Leo XIII to succeed Becker as the seventh bishop of Savannah. He received his episcopal consecration on June 3, 1900, from Gibbons, with Bishops Henry Northrop and John J. Monaghan serving as co-consecrators, at St. Peter's Cathedral in Richmond, Virginia. "One of the greatest challenges he faced during his tenure was a rabid anti-Catholicism."

During his tenure, Keiley completely restored the Cathedral of St. John the Baptist, which had been destroyed by fire in 1898; he dedicated the new edifice in October 1900. In other pronouncements, Keiley condemned prejudice and the lynching of African-Americans. In 1902, Keiley memorialized Confederate veterans and praised former Confederate President Jefferson Davis. At the same time, he condemned U.S. President Theodore Roosevelt for inviting the African-American educator Booker T. Washington to the White House. Keiley opposed an initiative to set up a seminary for African-Americans in the diocese, saying:

In America no black man should be ordained. Just as illegitimate sons are declared irregular by canon law...so blacks can be declared irregular because they are held in such contempt by whites.

Keiley was active in Confederate veteran organizations and was a frequent speaker at their memorial services. In 1904, Keiley, who had served under Confederate General James Longstreet, celebrated his funeral mass. Longstreet had converted to Catholicism in 1877.In 1903, after a pronouncement by Pope Pius X on church music, Keiley prohibited his nuns from leading church choirs. He complained to the Vatican that other American dioceses were too lenient on that rule. In 1907, Keiley invited the Society of Missionaries of Africa to enter the diocese and build churches and schools for African-Americans.

=== Death ===
Keiley's resignation as bishop of the Savannah due to poor health was accepted by Pope Pius XI on March 18, 1922; he was appointed titular bishop of Scilium on the same date. Benjamin Keiley died in Atlanta on June 17, 1925, at age 77. At his funeral mass, his bier was draped with a Confederate flag with a laurel wreath sent by the United Daughters of the Confederacy.

== See also ==
- Catholic Church in the United States
- Historical list of the Catholic bishops of the United States
- List of Catholic bishops of the United States
- Lists of patriarchs, archbishops, and bishops

== Episcopal succession ==
Catholic Church titles
Preceded by Thomas Albert Andrew Becker	Bishop of Savannah; 1900–1922	Succeeded by Michael Joseph Keyes
