= Diocese of Savannah =

Latin Catholic ecclesiastical jurisdiction in Georgia, United States

Coordinates: 32°04′22″N 81°05′11″W

Diocese of Savannah Diœcesis Savannensis
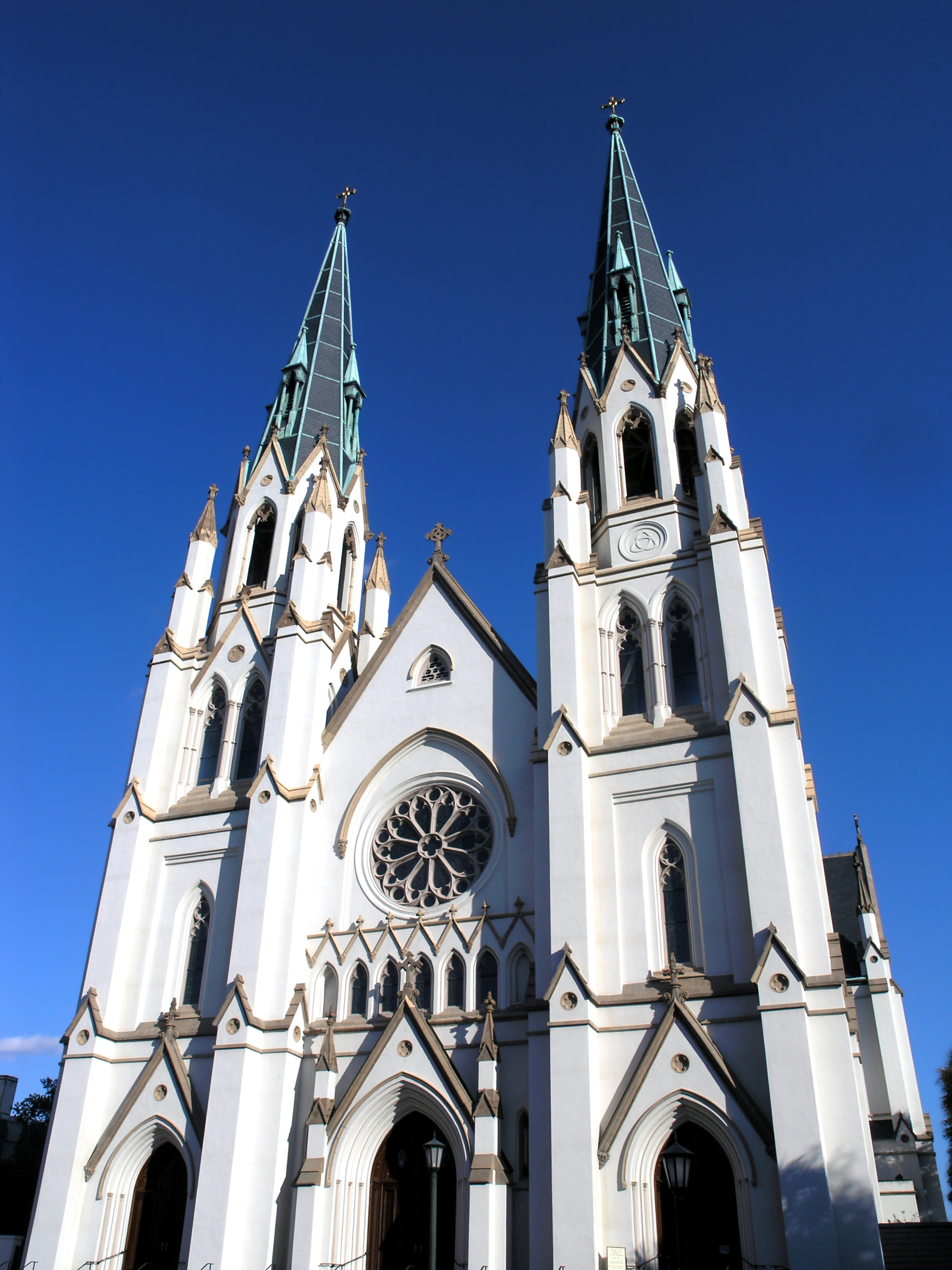
- Cathedral Basilica of St. John the Baptist

- Coat of arms

Location
- Country: United States
- Territory: Southern Georgia (Georgia (U.S. state))
- Ecclesiastical province: Atlanta

Statistics
- Population: Total; Catholics: (as of 2025); 2,995,000; 80,000 (3%)

Information
- Denomination: Catholic
- Sui iuris church: Latin Church
- Rite: Roman Rite
- Established: July 19, 1850
- Cathedral: Cathedral Basilica of Saint John the Baptist
- Patron saint: John the Baptist

Current leadership
- Pope: Leo XIV
- Bishop: Stephen D. Parkes
- Metropolitan Archbishop: Gregory John Hartmayer
- Bishops emeritus: J. Kevin Boland

Map
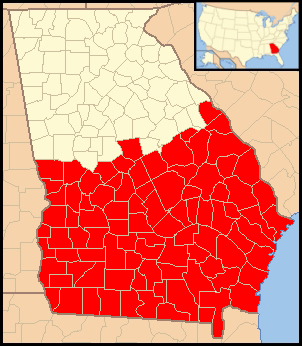

Website
- diosav.org

The Diocese of Savannah (Latin: Dioecesis Savannensis) is a diocese of the Catholic Church in southern Georgia in the United States. The mother church is Cathedral Basilica of Saint John the Baptist in Savannah. the bishop is Stephen D. Parkes. Savannah is a suffragan diocese of the Archdiocese of Atlanta.

== Territory ==
The Diocese of Savannah has more counties within its territory than any other diocese in the United States and covers 37,038 square miles (95,930 km^{2}). 99 priests serve 57 churches and 29 missions.

== Demographics ==
As of 2025, the diocese contained a total population of 2,950,000 and a Catholic population of 80,000. With only a 3% of the population, it is one of the lowest concentrations of Catholics in the United States.

== Name changes ==
The present day Diocese of Savannah has undergone name changes over the past 175 years:

- Diocese of Savannah (1850-1937)
- Diocese of Atlanta-Savannah (1937-1956)
- Diocese of Savannah (1956–present)

== History ==
=== 1700 to 1850 ===
Before and during the American Revolutionary War, the Catholics in all of the British colonies in North America were under the jurisdiction of the Apostolic Vicariate of the London District in England. However, Catholics were banned from the Georgia colony from its founding in 1733 until 1752, when it became a royal colony.

The first Catholics to arrive in the Province of Georgia were French refugees from the Haitian Revolution that started in 1791. They established the Congrégation de Saint Jean-Baptiste in Savannah and constructed a wood-frame church, the first Catholic church in the city.

Bishop Gartland (pre-1914)

Pope Pius VI erected the Prefecture Apostolic of the United States in 1784, encompassing the entire nation. Five years later, he converted the prefecture into the Diocese of Baltimore. In 1820, Pope Pius VII erected of the Diocese of Charleston, including all of the new State of Georgia. Most Holy Trinity Church, the oldest Catholic church in Georgia, was founded in Augusta in 1810. During the 1800s, Irish Catholic immigrants started swelling the Catholic population of Savannah. Saint Joseph's, the first Catholic parish in Macon, was established in 1841.

=== 1850 to 1870 ===
Pope Pius IX erected the Diocese of Savannah on July 19, 1850, from the Diocese of Charleston. The new diocese consisted of Georgia and the state of Florida, minus the Florida Panhandle region. Pius IX appointed Francis Gartland from the Diocese of Philadelphia as the first bishop of the new diocese.

During Gartland's tenure, the Catholic population in the diocese doubled; more priests were added, including recruits from Ireland. He erected three new churches and enlarged the Cathedral of St. John the Baptist in Savannah, dedicating it in June 1853. Gartland also established an orphanage and several Catholic schools. Gartland died of yellow fever in 1854 while visiting the sick during an epidemic in Savannah. The post of bishop was vacant for the next three years.

On January 9, 1857, Pius IX erected the Vicariate Apostolic of Florida and removed all of Florida from the Diocese of Savannah. At the same time, Pius IX named John Barry as bishop of Savannah. Barry also had a short tenure as bishop, dying in France in 1859. Pius IX appointed Bishop Augustin Vérot, then vicar apostolic of Florida, to be the next bishop of Savannah.

During the American Civil War of the early 1860s, Vérot condemned the looting of St. Michael's Church at Amelia Island, Florida, by Union Army troops. He personally evacuated several Sisters of Mercy from Jacksonville, Florida, to Savannah through the battle zone in Georgia. After the war, Vérot published a pastoral letter urging Catholics in the diocese to "put away all prejudice ...against their former servants". He also advocated a national coordinator for evangelization among African-Americans, and brought in French sisters from LePuy, France, to work with them.

=== 1870 to 1950 ===
Bishop Verot (pre-1914)

Pius IX erected the new Diocese of St. Augustine in 1870 and appointed Vérot as its first bishop. He named Bishop Ignatius Persico from the Roman Curia as Vérot's replacement in Savannah.

Poor health forced Persico to resign this post in 1873. William Gross, a member of the Redemptorist Order, was made the new bishop in 1873. During his tenure, Gross laid the cornerstone of the Cathedral of Our Lady of Perpetual Help in November 1873 and dedicated it in April 1876. In addition to erecting several churches, schools, orphanages, and hospitals, he also introduced the Jesuits and Benedictines to the diocese. Gross in 1874 dedicated the new Pio Nono College in Macon. The Sisters of Mercy in 1873 bought an existing hospital in Savannah, renaming it St. Joseph's Hospital. It is today St. Joseph's/Candler.

In 1885, Gross transferred to become the archbishop of the Archdiocese of Oregon City. Bishop Thomas Becker from the Diocese of Wilmington was appointed bishop of Savannah by Leo XIII in 1886. During his tenure, Becker added an episcopal residence to the Cathedral of St. John the Baptist, which he completed with the building of its spires in 1896. After the cathedral was nearly destroyed by fire in 1898, Becker solicited funds for its rebuilding.

=== 1900 to 1950 ===
Bishop Kelley (pre-1914)

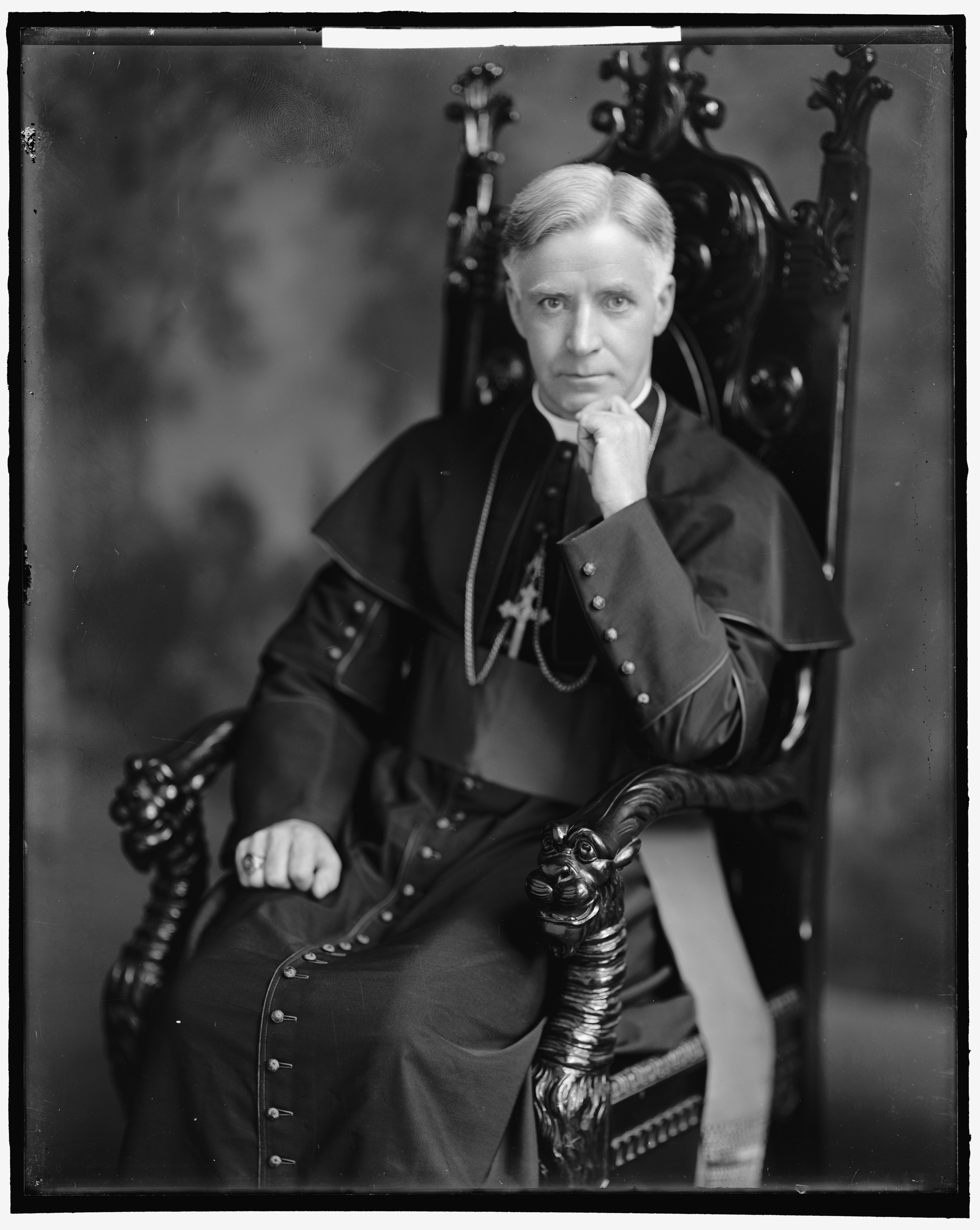
Bishop Keyes (1905)

After 13 years in office, Becker died in 1899. Leo XIII replaced him with Benjamin Keiley in 1900. Keiley oversaw the completion of the restoration of St. John the Baptist Cathedral started by Becker; he dedicated the new edifice in October 1900. In other pronouncements, Keiley condemned prejudice and the lynchings of African-Americans. In 1902, Keiley memorialized Confederate States Army veterans from the American Civil War and praised former Confederate President Jefferson Davis. Kelley condemned U.S. President Theodore Roosevelt for inviting the African-American educator Booker T. Washington to the White House. Keiley opposed an initiative to set up a seminary for African-Americans in the diocese, saying that "no black man should be ordained. Just as illegitimate sons are declared irregular by canon law ... so blacks can be declared irregular because they are held in such contempt by whites."

In 1903, after a pronouncement by Pope Pius X on church music, Keiley prohibited his nuns from leading church choirs. He complained to the Vatican that other dioceses in the United States were lenient on that rule. In 1907, Keiley invited the Society of Missionaries of Africa to enter the diocese and build churches and schools for African-Americans. After Keiley resigned due to poor health in 1922, Pope Pius XI appointed Michael Keyes of the Marist Brothers to be the new bishop of Savannah. On July 11, 1934, Keyes asked parishioners in his diocese to sign a pledge from the Legion of Decency to protest "...vile and unwholesome motion pictures." Keyes retired as bishop of Savannah in 1935.

Auxiliary Bishop Gerald O'Hara from the Archdiocese of Philadelphia was appointed bishop of Savannah by Pius XI in 1935. During his tenure, O'Hara built the Cathedral of Christ the King in Atlanta, dedicated in January 1939. The cathedral was built on the former site of Ku Klux Klan gatherings, and O'Hara even invited Imperial Wizard Hiram Evans, the Klan leader, to the dedication. O'Hara once criticized the Savannah Press after the newspaper ran a whimsical St. Patrick's Day editorial repeating the old fable crediting Saint Patrick with having granted women the privilege to woo during leap years. O'Hara was considered a leader in church efforts to improve race relations, launching a seven-point social and racial program in the 1930s, calling for aid to African American children and heightened awareness of rural issues.

Pius XI renamed the Diocese of Savannah as the Diocese of Savannah-Atlanta on January 5, 1937. This action reflected the increased population and rising prominence of Atlanta. He also designated the Church of Christ the King in Atlanta as the co-cathedral in the second see.

=== 1950 to present ===
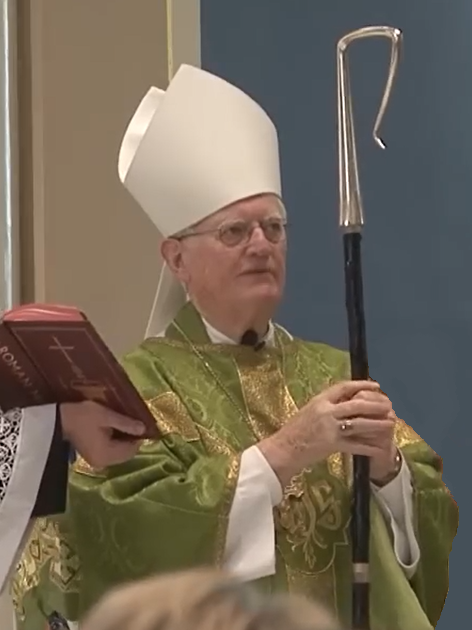
Bishop Boland (2015)

With the increased Catholic population in northern Georgia, Pope Pius XII on July 2, 1956, erected the Diocese of Atlanta. Northern Georgia went into the new diocese and southern Georgia stayed into the newly renamed Diocese of Savannah.

Pope John XXIII appointed Auxiliary Bishop Thomas J. McDonough of St. Augustine as auxiliary bishop in Savannah in 1957. O'Hara resigned as bishop of Savannah in 1959 to serve full time as a papal diplomat and John XXIII replaced him with McDonough. He signed the "Pentecost Statement" of the bishops of the Atlanta Province, condemning racial discrimination as contrary to Christian principles.

On February 10, 1962, Pope John XXIII elevated the Diocese of Atlanta to the Archdiocese of Atlanta. The Diocese of Savannah was removed from the Archdiocese of Baltimore and designated a suffragan of the new archdiocese.

In 1967, Pope Paul VI appoint McDonough as archbishop of the Archdiocese of Louisville and named Monsignor Gerard Frey from the Archdiocese of New Orleans as his successor in Savannah. During his tenure, Frey launched the Social Apostolate, a social service agency designed "to put people in the pews in touch with the poor." He also encouraged every church in the diocese to establish a parish council. After appointing Frey as bishop of the Diocese of Lafayette in Louisiana in 1972, Paul VI named Raymond W. Lessard from the Diocese of Fargo to replace him in Savannah. Lessard once served as liaison between Catholic bishops and married Episcopalian clergy seeking Catholic ordination. He once described racism as "the paramount social problem affecting our area".

J. Kevin Boland became the next bishop of Savannah in 1995. He retired in 2010. Gregory Hartmayer of the Conventual Franciscans replaced him. In 2020, Pope Francis appointed Hartmayer as archbishop of Atlanta. Francis named Stephen D. Parkes from the Diocese of Orlando as bishop of Savannah.

In May 2022, Parkes contacted the Dicastery for Divine Worship and the Discipline of the Sacraments in Rome, requesting permission to continue the Traditional Latin Mass in the diocese. This dispensation was granted for the period of one year; however, in September 2023, the Dicastery extended it for an additional two years.

Parkes continued to support the canonization cause of the five Georgia Martyrs. They were Spanish Franciscan missionaries executed in 1597 by Native Americans on the Georgia coast. Lessard initiated their cause in 1984. In January 2025, the Vatican confirmed their deaths as acts of martyrdom "in hatred of the faith". This declaration named the five men as Venerable and authorized their beatification in October 2026.

=== Sexual abuse ===
In 2004, the Diocese of Savannah reported that it had paid a total of $50,000 to 12 people who accused six diocesan priests of sexually abusing them. One of these priests, Wayland Brown, had been sentenced in 2003 to ten years in prison in Maryland for molesting two boys. He was laicized in 2004.

In 2009, the diocese agreed to a $4.24 million lawsuit settlement with Allan Ranta, another victim of sexual abuse by Brown.

The diocese reached a settlement in 2016 of $4.5 million to a man who accused Brown of sexually abusing him in the 1980s. Authorities could not criminally charge Brown with this offense due to the Georgia statute of limitations. On November 12, 2018, Bishop Hartmayer released a list of 16 clergy from the diocese with credible accusations of sexual abuse of minors. When Georgia Attorney General Christopher M. Carr announced an investigation in May 2019 into sexual abuse claims against Catholic clergy in Georgia, Hartmayer pledged the full support of the diocese.

Brown pleaded guilty in South Carolina in 2018 to six counts of criminal sexual conduct with a minor, second degree and three counts of criminal sexual conduct with a minor, first degree. Brown was sentenced to 20 years in prison. He died in prison in 2019.

The Prosecuting Attorneys’ Council of Georgia in March 2023 released a report that identified seven diocesan priests and eight religious order priests in the diocese as having credible accusations of sexual abuse of minors.

== Bishops ==
The diocese was founded in 1850 as the Diocese of Savannah, covering all of Georgia and part of Florida. From 1937 to 1956, it was the Diocese of Savannah-Atlanta. In 1956, it became the Diocese of Savannah again when northern Georgia was split off into the Diocese of Atlanta.

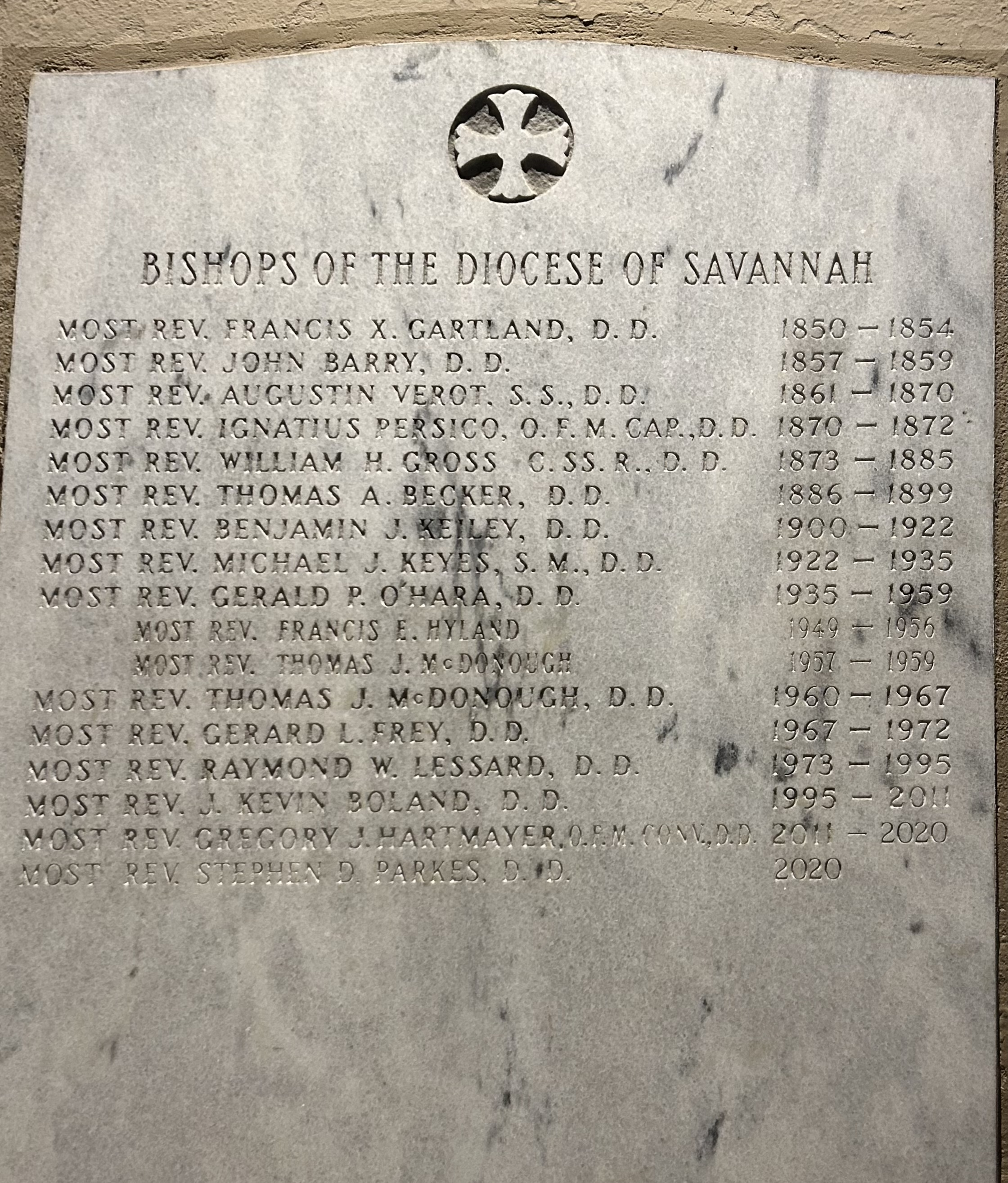
Plaque in St. John the Baptist Basilica listing the bishops of Savannah (2023)

=== Bishops of Savannah (1850 to 1937) ===
1. Francis Xavier Gartland (1850–1854)
2. John Barry (1857–1859)
3. Augustin Verot (1861–1870), appointed Bishop of Saint Augustine
4. Ignatius Persico (1870–1872)
5. William Hickley Gross (1873–1885), appointed Archbishop of Oregon City
6. Thomas Albert Andrew Becker (1886–1899)
7. Benjamin Joseph Keiley (1900–1922)
8. Michael Joseph Keyes (1922–1935)
9. Gerald Patrick Aloysius O'Hara (1936–1959), Archbishop (personal title) in 1950; appointed Apostolic Nuncio to Ireland and later Apostolic Delegate to Great Britain

=== Bishop of Savannah-Atlanta (1937 to 1956) ===
- Gerald Patrick Aloysius O'Hara (1936–1959),

=== Bishop of Savannah (1956 to present) ===
1. Gerald Patrick Aloysius O'Hara (1936–1959),
2. Thomas Joseph McDonough (1960–1967), appointed Archbishop of Louisville
3. Gerard Louis Frey (1967–1973), appointed Bishop of Lafayette in Louisiana
4. Raymond W. Lessard (1973–1995)
5. J. Kevin Boland (1995–2011)
6. Gregory John Hartmayer (2011–2020), appointed Archbishop of Atlanta
7. Stephen D. Parkes (2020–present)

=== Auxiliary bishops ===
- Francis Edward Hyland (1949–1956), appointed Bishop of Atlanta
- Thomas Joseph McDonough (1957–1960), appointed Bishop of Savannah

=== Other diocesan priests who became bishops ===
- Andrew Joseph McDonald, appointed Bishop of Little Rock in 1972
- Emmet M. Walsh, appointed Bishop of Charleston in 1927 and later Coadjutor Bishop of Youngstown succeeding to that see

== Clergy and religious ==
As of 2020, the Diocese of Savannah had 102 priests and members of religious orders.

== Education ==
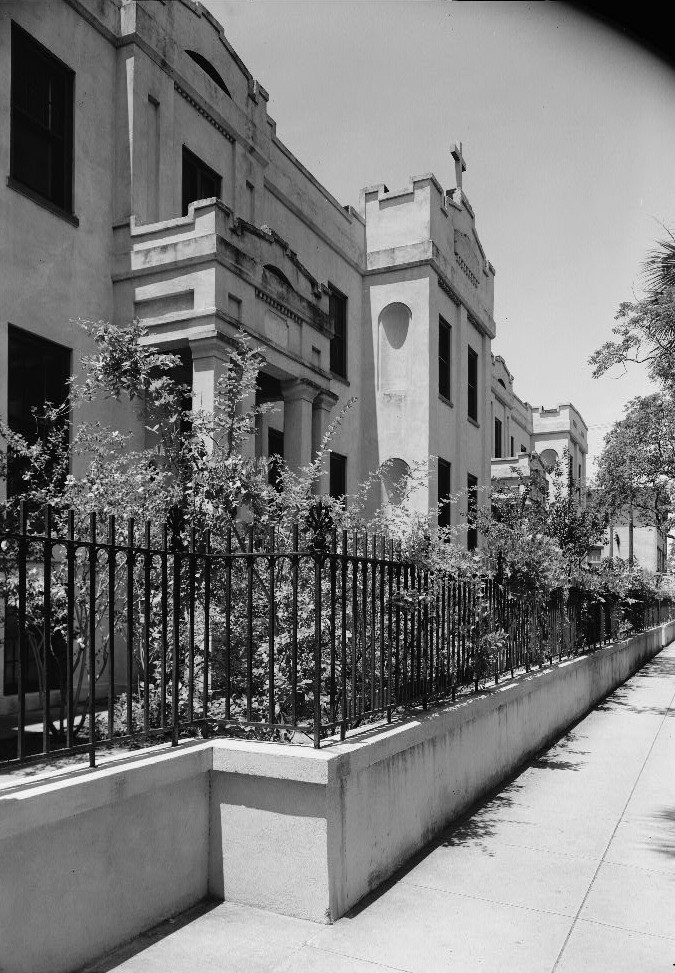
St. Vincent's Academy, Savannah, Georgia (circa 1933)

As of 2024, the Diocese of Savannah has five high schools and 11 elementary schools. The high schools include:

- Aquinas High School, Augusta
- Benedictine Military School, Savannah
- Mount de Sales Academy, Macon
- Pacelli High School, Columbus
- St. Vincent's Academy, Savannah
