= Ignatius Persico =

Italian cardinal

His Eminence Ignazio Persico O.F.M. Cap.
- Prefect of the Congregation for Indulgences and Sacred Relics
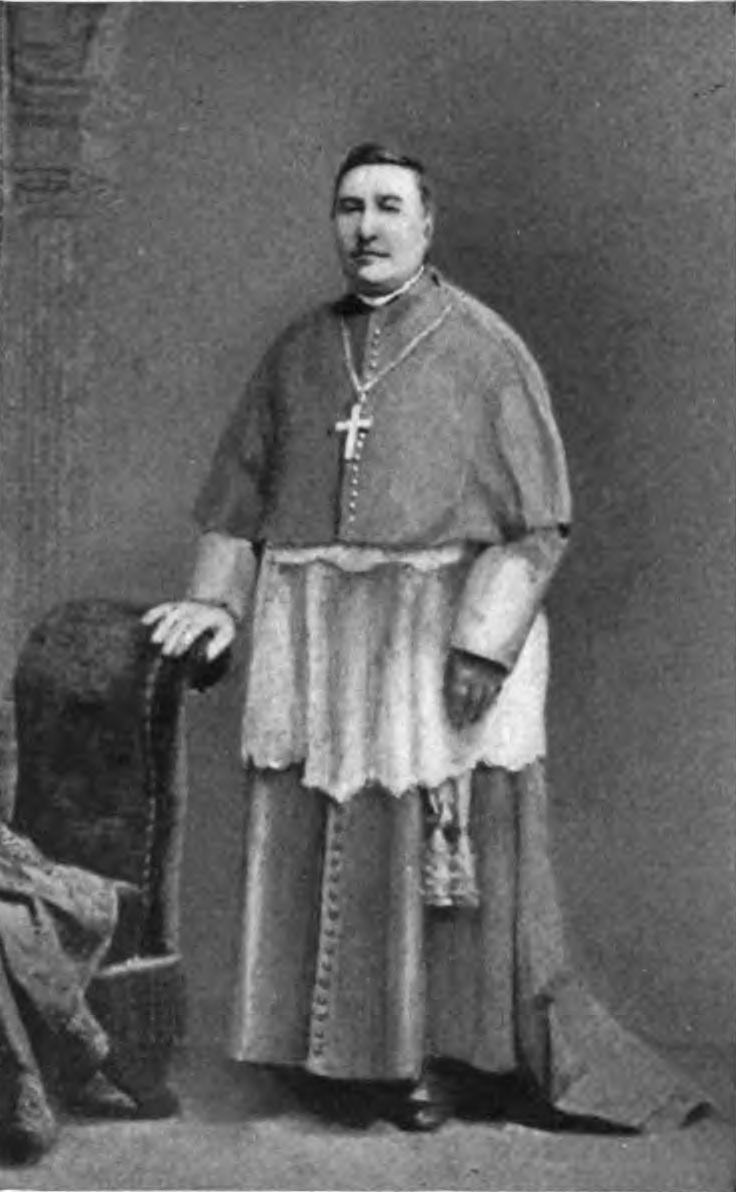
- Church: Roman Catholic Church
- Appointed: 30 May 1893
- Term ended: 7 December 1895
- Predecessor: Luigi Sepiacci
- Successor: Andreas Steinhuber
- Other post: Cardinal-Priest of San Pietro in Vincoli (1893–95)
- Previous posts: Coadjutor Vicar Apostolic of Bombay (1854–56); Titular Bishop of Gratianopolis (1854–70); Vicar Apostolic of Agra (1856–60); Bishop of Savannah (1870–72); Titular Bishop of Bolina (1874–79); Coadjutor Bishop of Aquino (1878–79); Coadjutor Bishop of Pontecorvo (1878–79); Coadjutor Bishop of Sora (1878–79); Bishop of Aquino (1879–87); Bishop of Pontecorvo (1879–87); Bishop of Sora (1879–87); Titular Archbishop of Tamiathis (1887–93); Secretary of the Congregation of the Propagation of the Faith (1891–93)

Orders
- Ordination: 24 January 1846 by Gennaro Pasca
- Consecration: 4 June 1854 by Anastasius Hartmann
- Created cardinal: 16 January 1893 by Pope Leo XIII
- Rank: Cardinal-Priest

Personal details
- Born: Pietro Persico; 30 January 1823 Naples, Kingdom of the Two Sicilies
- Died: 7 December 1895 (aged 72) Rome, Kingdom of Italy
- Buried: Campo Verano
- Parents: Francesco Xaverio Persico; Giuseppina Pennacchio

Ignazio Camillo Guglielmo Maria Pietro Persico (30 January 1823 – 7 December 1895) was an Italian cardinal of the Roman Catholic Church.

He served multiple assignments, including as vicar apostolic, bishop, apostolic delegate to Ireland, and vicar of the Roman Colleges. He briefly served as the bishop of the Diocese of Savannah in Georgia in the United States from 1870 to 1873.

== Early life ==
Ignazio Persico was born on 30 January 1823 in Naples, in the Kingdom of Italy. He entered the Capuchin Franciscan Order on 25 April 1839.

== Priesthood ==
He was ordained into the priesthood in Naples for the Franciscan Order on 24 January 1846 by Bishop Gennaro Pasca.

In November 1846, Persico was sent to Patna, in British India. Vicar Apostolic Anastasius Hartmann made him his socius and confidant. In 1850, Persico accompanied Hartmann to Bombay. Persico was then transferred to the Apostolic Vicariate of Bombay. He assisted Hartmann in founding a seminary in Bombay and establishing the Bombay Catholic Examiner. In 1853, the Vatican was facing a schism among Portuguese and Indian priests in Goa, a small Indian colony of the Portuguese Empire. Bishop Hartmann sent Persico to Rome to discuss the problem with Pope Pius IX and then to London to do the same with British officials.

== Vicar Apostolic of Bombay and Agra ==
Indian Rebellion of 1857

Persico was appointed on 8 March 1854 as coadjutor vicar apostolic for the Apostolic Vicariate of Bombay and Titular Bishop of Gratianopolis by Pius IX. Persico was consecrated by Hartmann on 4 June 1854.

In 1855, Persico was appointed visitor of the Apostolic Vicariate of Agra in Agra, in British India. He was later named vicar apostolic of that district. During the Indian Rebellion of 1857 against British occupation forces, Persico was in danger several times. His health deteriorated. He wrote an eyewitness account of the events in Agra that was published in 1858. Persico returned in 1860 to Italy to recover his health.

== Later positions ==
In 1866, the Vatican sent Persico to the United States to perform mission work. While there, he participated in the Council of Baltimore.

On 11 March 1870, Persico was appointed bishop of the Diocese of Savannah in the Southern United States. However, Pope Pius IX accepted his resignation from this position due to continuing health problems on 25 August 1872.

In 1874, Pius IX named Persico as titular bishop of Bolina and sent him to serve in Canada as an apostolic delegate. In 1877, he was sent back to India to settle a church schism.

== Bishop of Sora-Cassino-Aquino-Pontecorvo ==
On 15 July 1878, Persico was appointed by Pope Leo XIII as coadjutor bishop of the Diocese of Sora-Cassino-Aquino-Pontecorvo, in Italy. On 26 March 1879, he became bishop of that diocese after the death of Bishop Paolo do Niquesa. On 5 March 1887, Persico resigned his post.

== Roman Curia ==
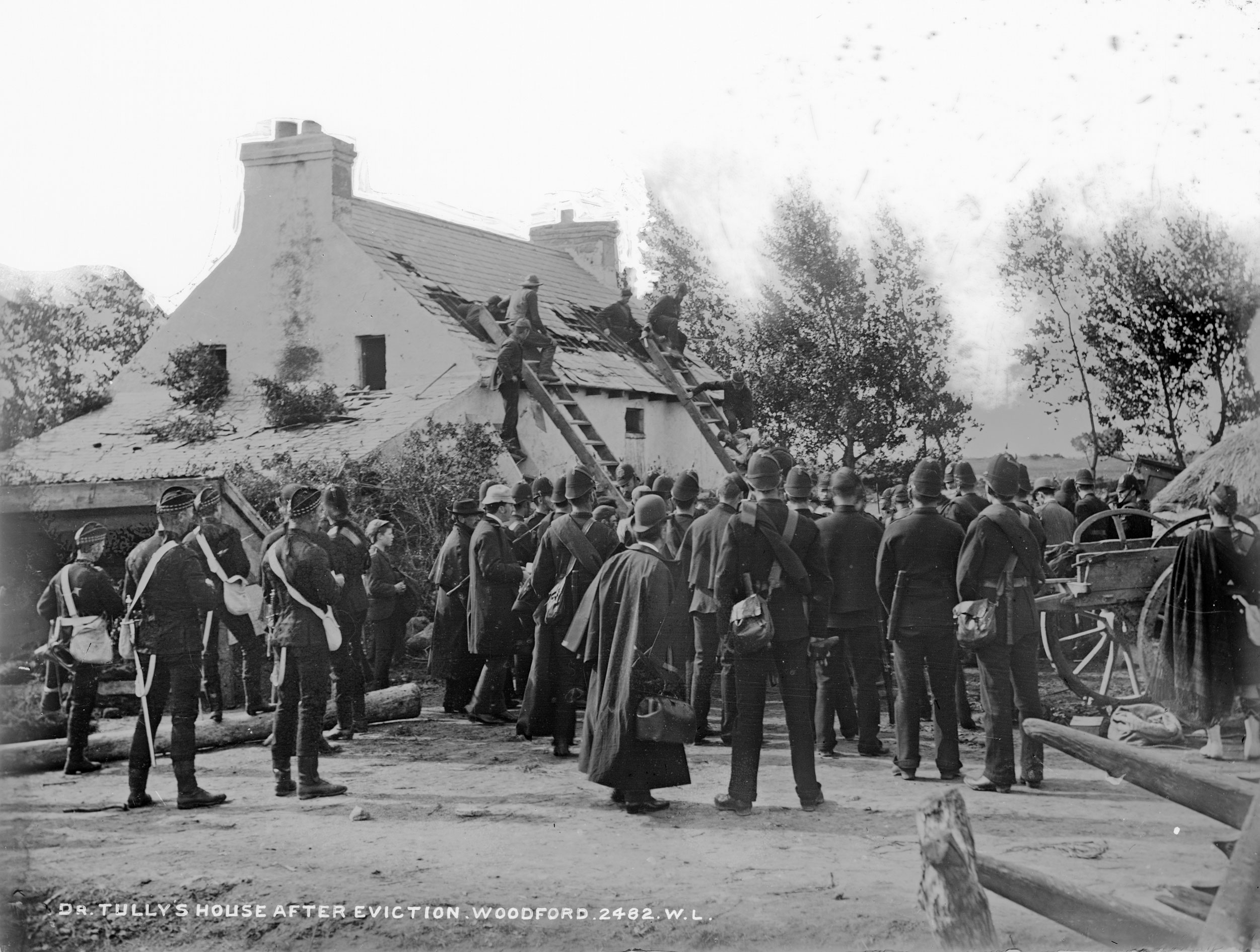
Eviction of family in Ireland by British landlord, 1888

On 14 March 1887, Persico was promoted to the Roman Curia and appointed titular archbishop of Tamiatha. Leo XIII then sent Persico to serve as apostolic delegate to Ireland, then part of the United Kingdom, to evaluate the ties between the Irish clergy and the Irish nationalist movement. Persico quickly realized that he needed to consider the history of Ireland in addition to the current politics and delayed his report to analyze it. At that time, the Irish National League was promoting the Plan of Campaign, a political strategy to force British absentee landlords to lower the rents charged to financially-strapped Irish tenant farmers.

On 23 April 1888, before Persico could complete his report, the Congregation of the Holy Office declared its opposition to the Plan of Campaign and condemned the use of boycotting by Irish activists. In June 1888, Leo XIII was issued the encyclical "Saepe Nos", reinforcing and defending the condemnation. According to the author Edward Purcell, the ruling was a surprise and disappointment for Persico.

His mission in Ireland terminated, Persico returned to Rome much disappointed.

On 16 January 1893, Persico was created cardinal priest of the title of St. Peter in Chains.

== Death and legacy ==
Persico died in Rome on 7 December 1895 and was buried at the Church of Propaganda Fide, Campo Verano Cemetery.

Catholic Church titles
Preceded by Augustin Verot	Bishop of Savannah; 1870–1874	Succeeded by William Hickley Gross
