= Michael Joseph Keyes =

Catholic bishop (1876–1959)

His Excellency, The Most Reverend Michael Joseph Keyes S.M.
- Bishop of Savannah titular bishop of Areopolis
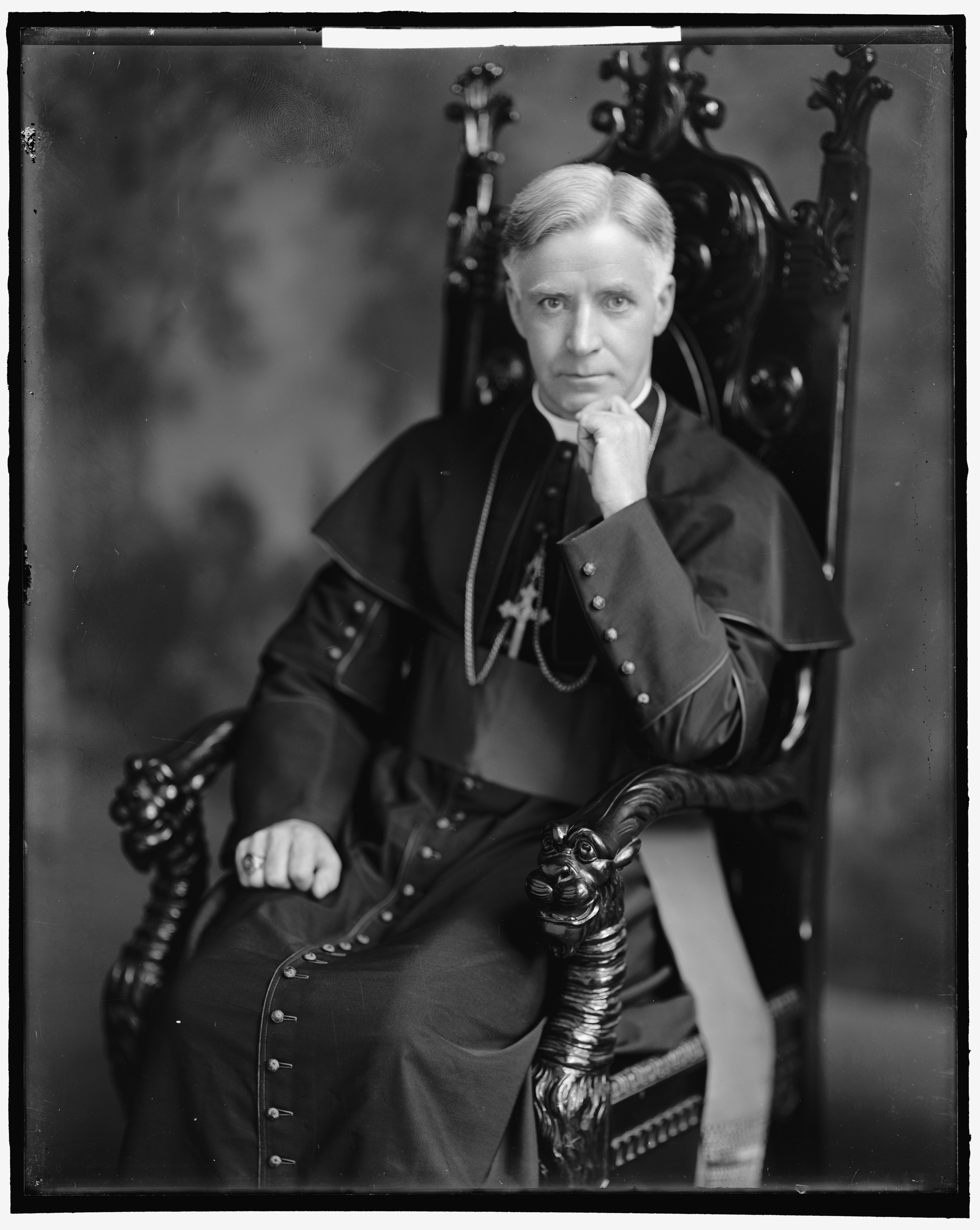
- See: Diocese of Savannah
- In office: October 18, 1922 - September 23, 1935
- Predecessor: Benjamin Joseph Keiley
- Successor: Gerald Patrick O'Hara

Orders
- Ordination: June 21, 1907 by Alfred Allen Paul Curtis
- Consecration: October 18, 1922 by Michael Joseph Curley

Personal details
- Born: February 28, 1876 Dingle, County Kerry, Ireland
- Died: August 7, 1959 (aged 83) Washington, D.C., USA
- Education: Catholic University of America

Michael Joseph Keyes, S.M. (February 28, 1876 – August 7, 1959) was an Irish-born American prelate of the Roman Catholic Church who served as bishop of the Diocese of Savannah in Georgia from 1922 to 1935. He previously served as director of Marist College at the Catholic University of America in Washington, D.C.

== Biography ==
=== Early life ===
Michael Keyes was born on February 28, 1876, in Dingle, County Kerry in Ireland on February 28, 1876. He attended Christian Brothers schools in Dingle, then became an assistant teacher at one of the schools for three years. Keyes immigrated to the United States in 1896, teaching for several years at All Hallows College in Salt Lake City, Utah.

While in Utah, Keyes became acquainted with several Marist Brothers priests who motivated him to join the priesthood. Keyes moved to Washington, D.C., in 1901 to join the Marist Brothers congregation. He spent the next six years preparing for the priesthood by studying philosophy and theology.

=== Priesthood ===
Keyes was ordained to the priesthood by Bishop Alfred Curtis in Washington for the Marist Brothers on June 21, 1907. After his ordination, he took a position teaching moral theology and canon law at the Marist College of the Catholic University of America. He eventually became director of the college. Keyes became an American citizen in 1921. In early 1922, Keyes was appointed as secretary to Cardinal Giovanni Bonzano, the apostolic delegate to the United States

=== Bishop of Savannah ===
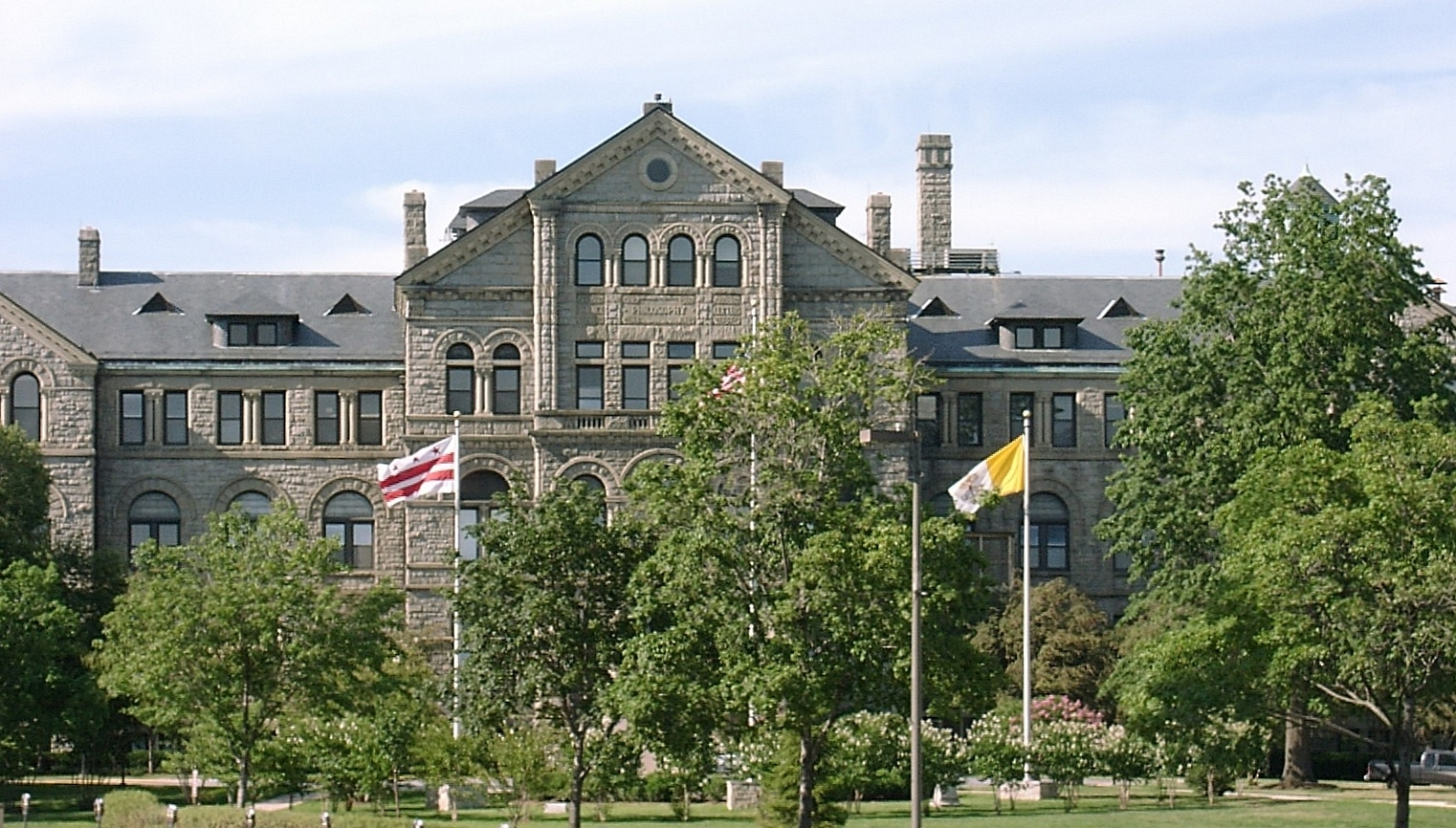
Catholic University of America, Washington, D.C. (2000)

On June 27, 1922, Keyes was appointed as the eighth bishop of the Diocese of Savannah by Pope Pius XI. He received his episcopal consecration on October 18, 1922, from Archbishop Michael Curley, with Bishops Denis J. O'Connell and Patrick Joseph Barry serving as co-consecrators. On July 11, 1934, Keyes asked parishioners in his diocese to sign a pledge from the Legion of Decency to protest "...vile and unwholesome motion pictures."

Keyes's resignation as bishop of Savannah for health reasons was accepted by Pius XI on September 23, 1935; he was named titular bishop of Areopolis on the same date. After his health improved, Keyes moved back to Washington, D.C., to teach moral theology again at Marist College for the next 23 years.

Michael Keyes died in Providence Hospital in Washington, D.C., on August 7, 1959, at age 83.

== See also ==
- Catholic Church hierarchy
- Catholic Church in the United States
- Historical list of the Catholic bishops of the United States
- List of Catholic bishops of the United States
- Lists of patriarchs, archbishops, and bishops

== Episcopal succession ==
Catholic Church titles
Preceded by Benjamin Joseph Keiley	Bishop of Savannah; 1922–1935	Succeeded by Gerald Patrick Aloysius O'Hara
