= Pio Nono College (Georgia) =

Defunct Roman Catholic college in Macon, Georgia, US

Pio Nono College was a Roman Catholic college in Macon, Georgia which operated from 1876 to 1920. The cornerstone was laid by Reverend William H. Gross, Bishop of Savannah, Georgia, in May 1874, at which time the New York Times stated that it was to be "by far the largest Catholic college in the South." The original building was five stories tall, 175 feet long by 65 ft wide, and sat on 40 acres. It operated as a non-denominational institution, and was not successful. In 1883, it was taken over by the Jesuits, and renamed St. Stanislaus College. It burned to the ground in November of 1921 and was not rebuilt. In 1926 the site was divided into 110 lots and became Macon's first subdivision, called "Stanislaus" after the college.
