= Cathedral Basilica of St. John the Baptist (Savannah, Georgia) =

Historic church in Georgia, United States

Coordinates: 32.07333°N 81.09088°W

- The Cathedral Basilica of St. John the Baptist
- Cathedral Basilica of St. John the Baptist
- Location: 222 East Harris Street, Lafayette Square, Savannah, Georgia
- Country: United States
- Denomination: Catholic Church
- Website: Savannah Cathedral Website

History
- Dedicated: April 30, 1876

Architecture
- Architect: Ephraim Francis Baldwin
- Style: Gothic Revival

Administration
- Diocese: Savannah

Clergy
- Bishop: Stephen D. Parkes
- Rector: J. Gerard Schreck
- Cathedral Basilica of St. John the Baptist
- U.S. National Historic Landmark District – Contributing property
- Location within Georgia Location within the United States
- Part of: Savannah Historic District (ID66000277)
- Added to NRHP: November 13, 1966

The Cathedral Basilica of St. John the Baptist is a Roman Catholic cathedral and minor basilica near Lafayette Square at 222 East Harris Street, Savannah, Georgia, in the United States. It is the mother church of the Roman Catholic Diocese of Savannah.

== History ==
=== Saint John the Baptist Church ===
The roots of the cathedral date back to the 18th century. Before the American Revolution of 1776 to 1783, the American colonies had created legal restrictions against the practice of Catholicism. These were rooting in fear of England's Catholic rivals as well as religious prejudice. The 1732 charter of the Province of Georgia explicitly prohibited Catholics from residing in the colony.

The ratification of the US Constitution in 1788 meant that Georgia could no longer ban Catholicism. The Vatican in 1789 established the Diocese of Baltimore, with jurisdiction over the entire United States. The first Catholics arrived in Savannah in the late 18th century. They were refugees from the French Revolution that started in 1789, along with French refugees who fled the Haitian Revolution of 1791.

In 1799, the Catholics in Savannah purchased a lot on Liberty Square in Charleston and constructed a small frame church. It was dedicated as Saint John the Baptist Church. By the early 19th century, many Black Hatian immigrants to Charleston started attending the church.

In 1811, the parish chose a site on Drayton and Perry Streets in Charleston for a larger building. In 1820, the Vatican erected the Diocese of Charleston, giving it jurisdiction over Georgia. That same year, Bishop John England of Charleston laid the cornerstone for the new church in Savannah. He returned on April 1, 1839, to consecrate the second Saint John the Baptist Church.

=== First Cathedral of Saint John the Baptist ===
In July 1850, Pope Pius IX erected the Diocese of Savannah and appointed Monsignor Francis Gartland as its first bishop Saint John the Baptist, the only Catholic church in Savannah, as designated as the Cathedral of Saint John the Baptist. A few weeks later, the church was heavily damaged by a hurricane that hit the city.

By the 1860s, the cathedral had become inadequate to the needs of the growing diocese. In 1870, Bishop Ignatius Persico began planning for a new cathedral. He purchased land for the project on Abercorn Street from the Sisters of Mercy.

=== Cathedral of Our Lady of Perpetual Help ===
The cornerstone for the new cathedral was laid on November 19, 1873, with the structure being named the Cathedral of Our Lady of Perpetual Help. Archbishop James Roosevelt Bayley of Baltimore presided at the dedication of the Neo-Gothic sanctuary on April 30, 1876.

=== Second Cathedral of Saint John the Baptist ===
Cathedral interior (pre-1914)

In 1883, the diocese was forced to revert to the original name for the cathedral, Saint John the Baptist. During an earlier visit to Rome, Bishop Thomas A. Becker had discovered that the naming of Our Lady of Perpetual Help had never been approved by the Vatican. In 1896, the diocese added spires to the structure along with coats of stucco and whitewash.

On February 6, 1898, a fire destroyed the cathedral interior. It was rebuilt and the first mass was held there in December1899. However, the renovation was not completed for an additional 13 years. It was rededicated on October 28, 1900, by Archbishop Sebastian Martinelli, the apostolic delegate to the United States. The diocese in 1904 installed stained glass windows from Austria-Hungary in the building.

After the diocese paid off the construction debt for the cathedral, it was consecrated by Bishop Benjamin Joseph Keiley in 1920. Bishop[ Thomas J. McDonough in 1959 began the first major restoration of the cathedral. A plaza was constructed on the cathedral grounds and the heating, cooling and lighting systems inside the structure were upgraded. McDonough also added a new altar rail and pulpit, along with changing the interior color scheme.

In 1984, Bishop Raymond W. Lessard was forced to close the cathedral for several months to replaced timber foundations that were rotting. He also made some changes mandated by the Second Vatican Council of the early 1960s, including orienting the high altar towards the pews.

Another major renovation of Saint John the Baptist was initiated in 1998 by Bishop J. Kevin Boland. On the exterior, the diocese replaced the entire roof. Inside. The diocese hired the Conrad Schmitt Studios of New Berlin, Wisconsin, to restore the painted surfaces, murals, stained glass window and stations of the cross. Other improvements included the purchase of a new high altar, ambo, tabernacle, baptismal font, ambry, cathedra and deacon chairs, along with a confessional, and crucifix image. The cathedral was rededicated in 2002.

In October 2003, Stuart Vincent Smith walked into the cathedral carrying a firearm and set the cathedra and pulpit on fire. Smith was immediately confronted by Monsignor William O'Neil, who said he would strangle him if he didn't drop the gun. The fire was quickly extinguished and police quickly took Smith into custody. Smith later pleaded guilty to several felonies and was sentenced to 20 years in prison. The damage to the cathedral was approximately $365,000

The diocese in 2012 discovered severe cracks in the cathedral steeples, caused by the 2011 earthquake in Northern Virginia. The cost of repairing the steeples and damage to some of the windows was $15 million.

=== Cathedral Basilica of Saint John the Baptist ===
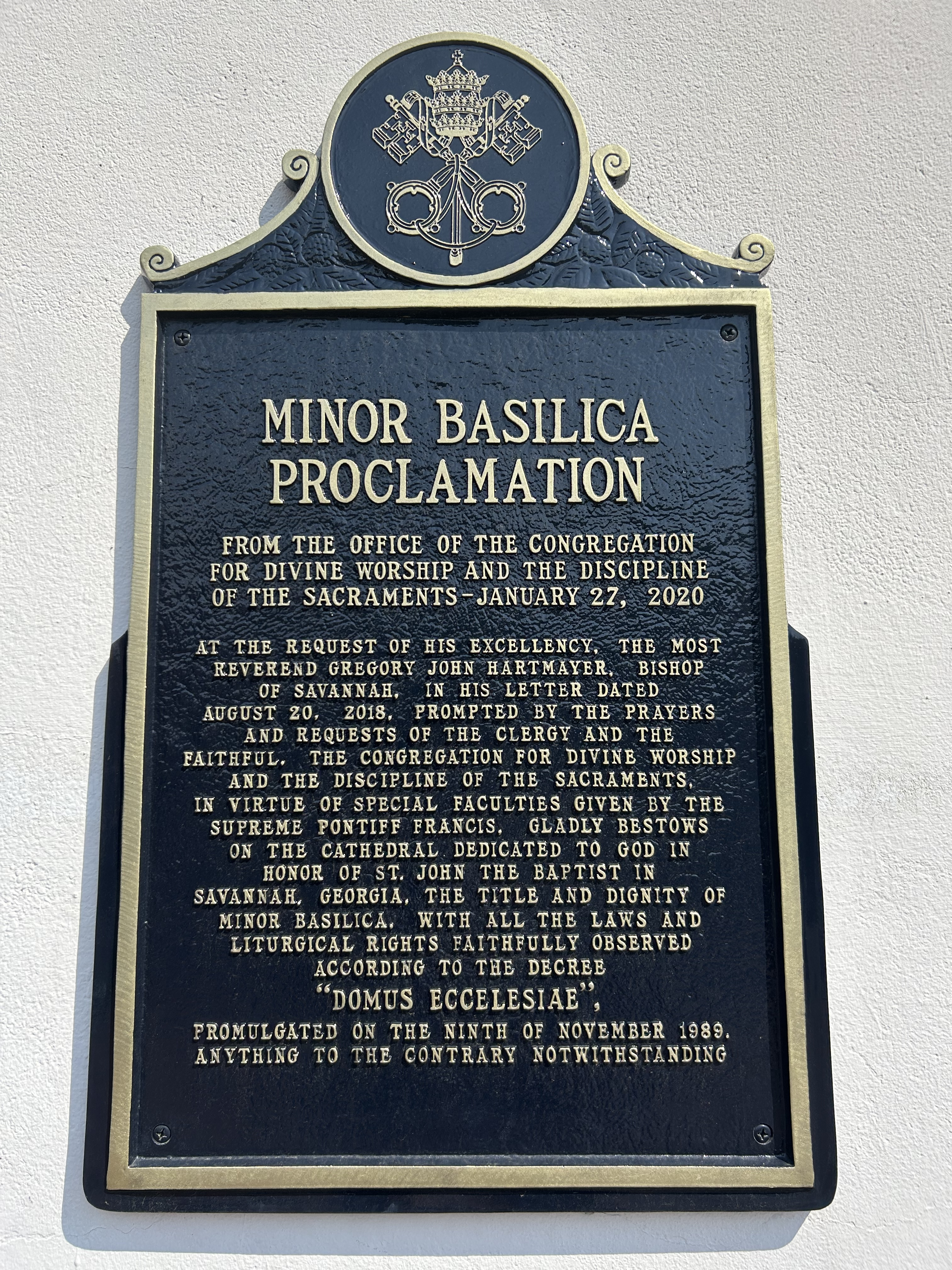
The minor basilica proclamation plaque (2023)

Pope Francis elevated the Cathedral of Saint John the Baptist to the Cathedral Basilica of Saint John the Baptist in January 2020. The basilica insignia was installed in the basilica in April 2023. That same year, the parish transformed the chapel in the lower level of the cathedral into a parish hall.

In 2024, the diocese initiated a $2.6 million project to reinforced the cathedral spires. The spires had become weakened due to decades of corrosion and needed to be reinforced eight and half tons of steel.

== Architecture ==
The Cathedral Basilica of St. John the Baptist was the first church building in Georgia constructed of brick. It features 81 stained glass windows and 16 gargoyles. The basilica is 214 feet (65 m) tall with a roof height of 96 feet (29 m). It took over 90,000 copper nails and 45,000 slates to construct.

== Gallery ==
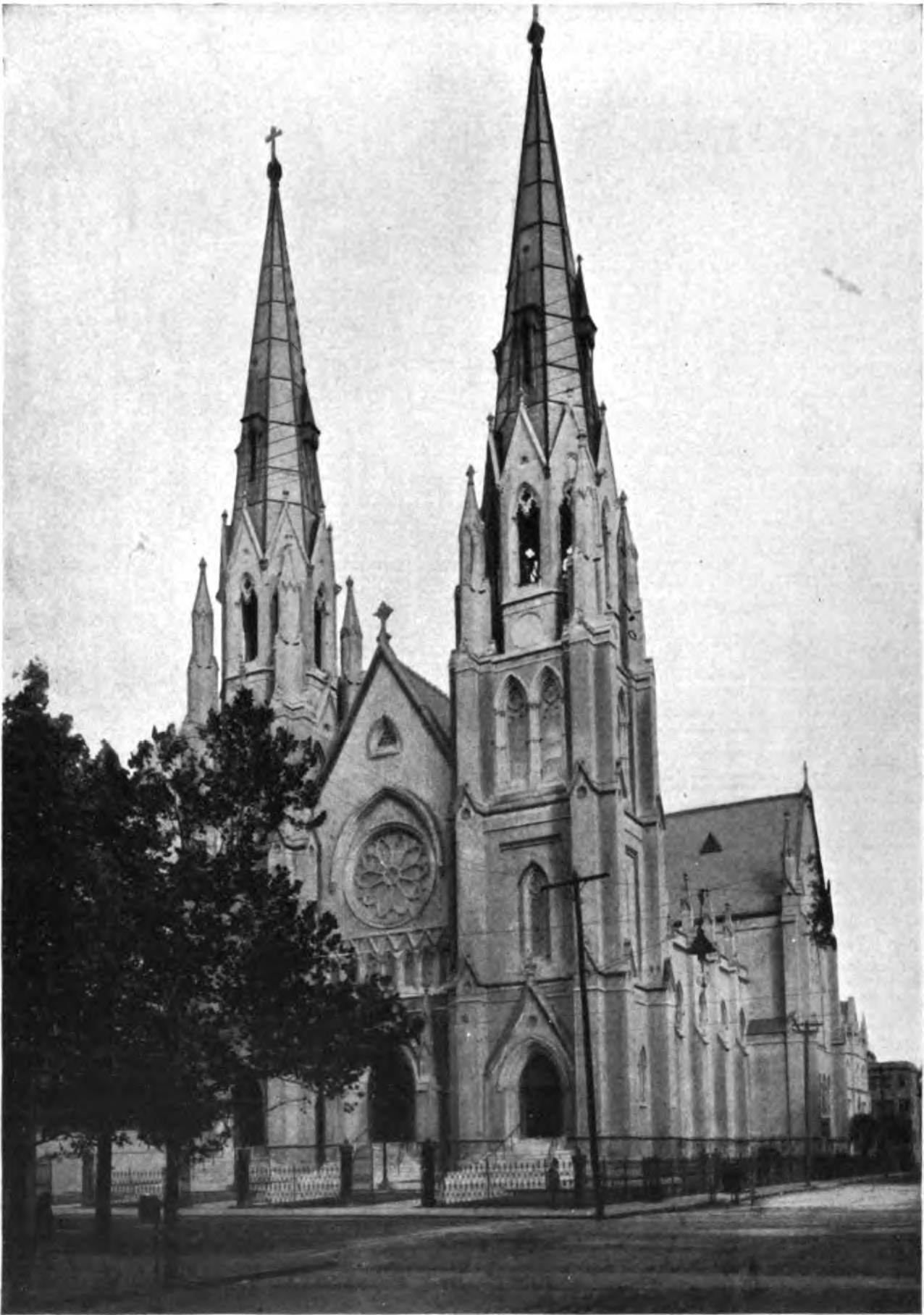
Cathedral exterior (pre-1914)

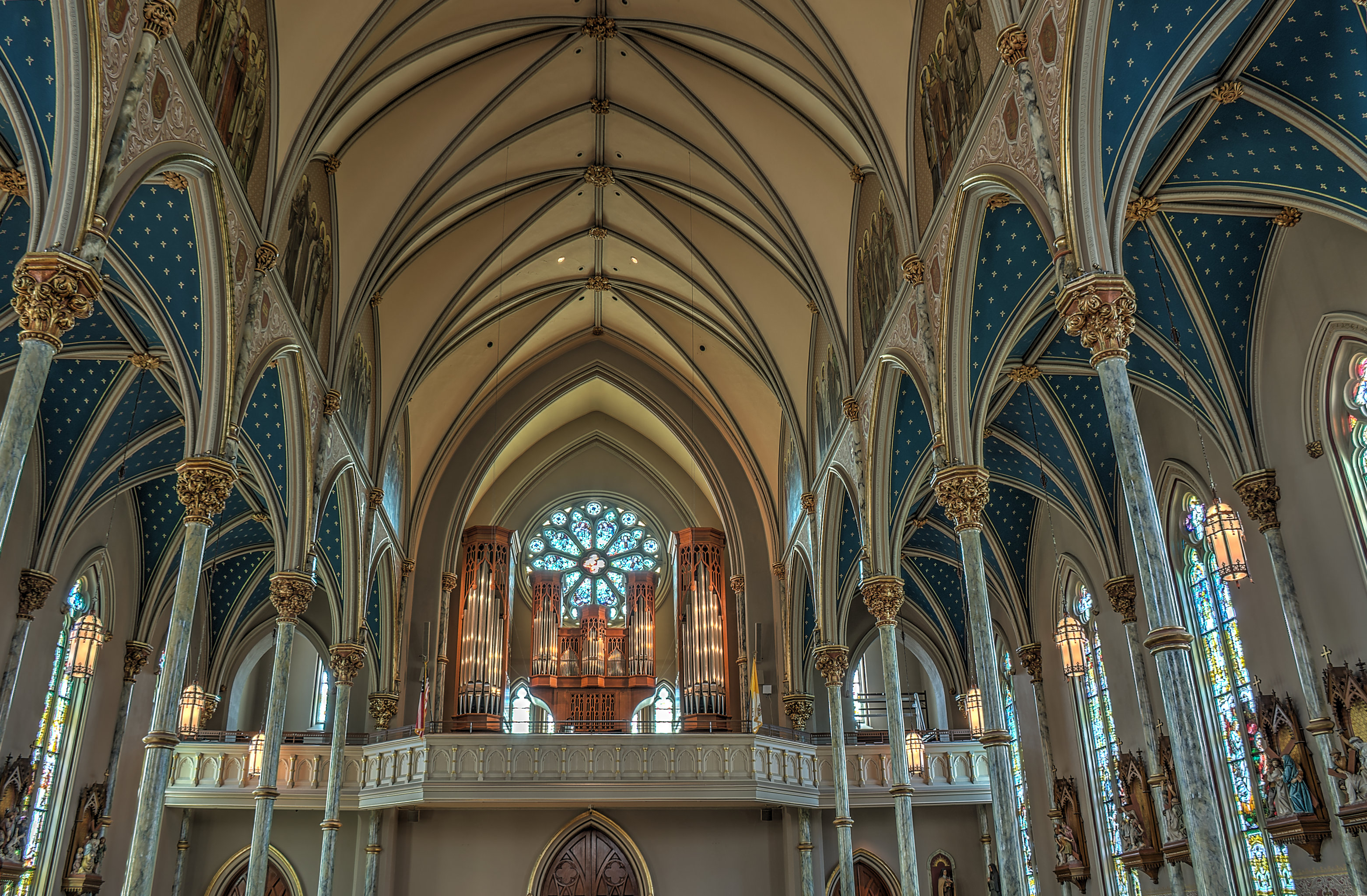
Rear nave and organ loft (2015)

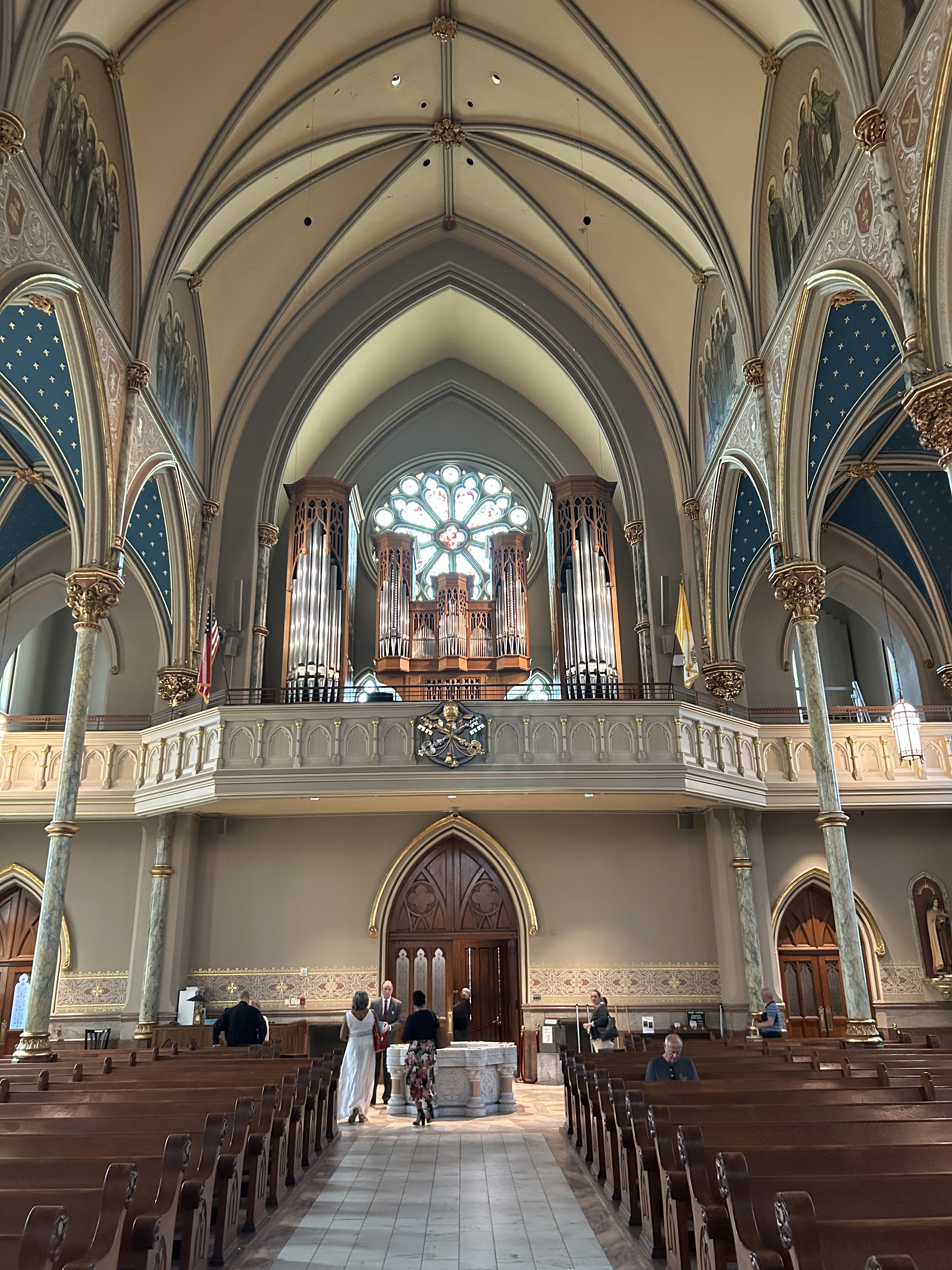
Organ loft (2023)

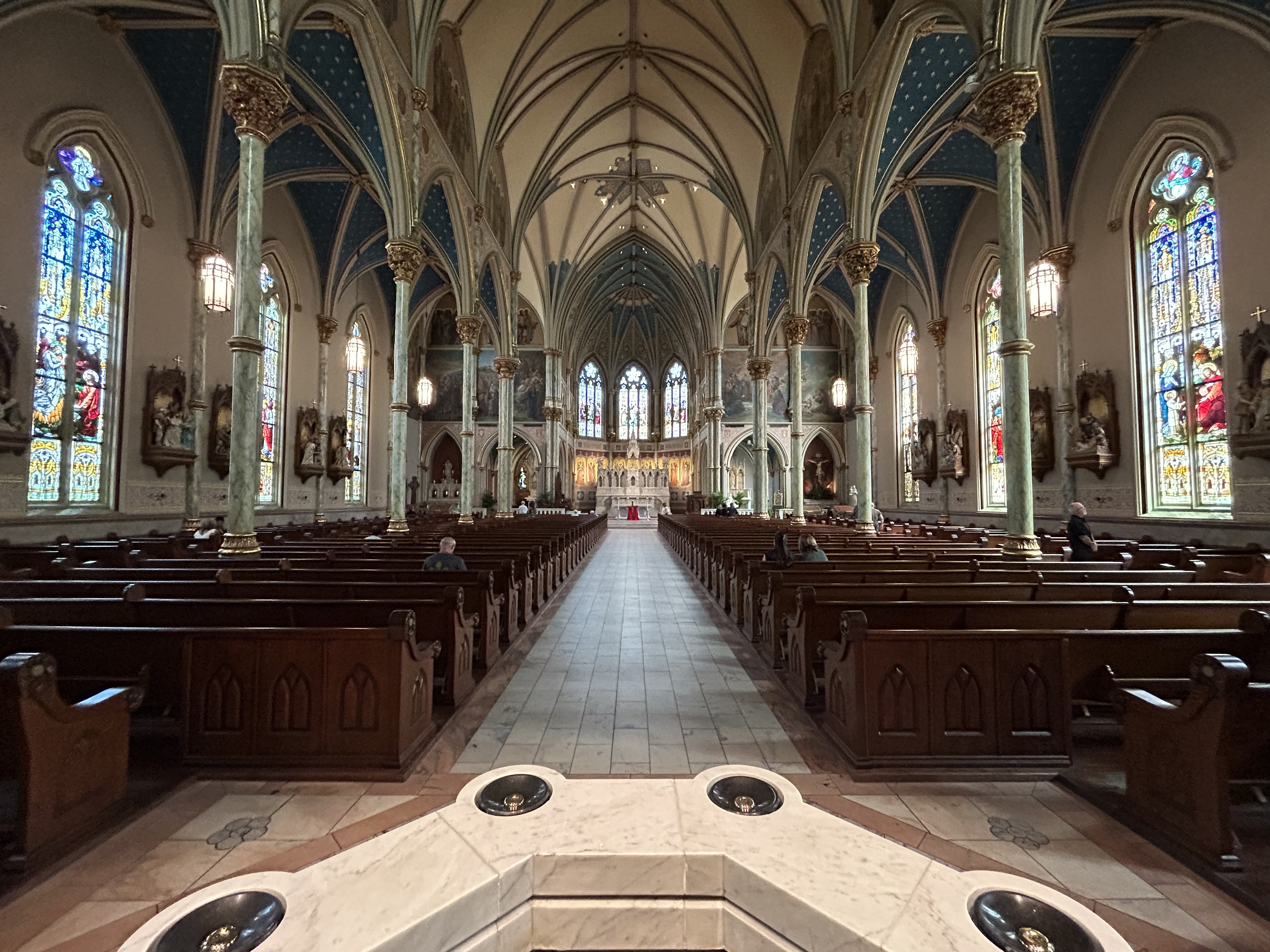
Nave (2023)

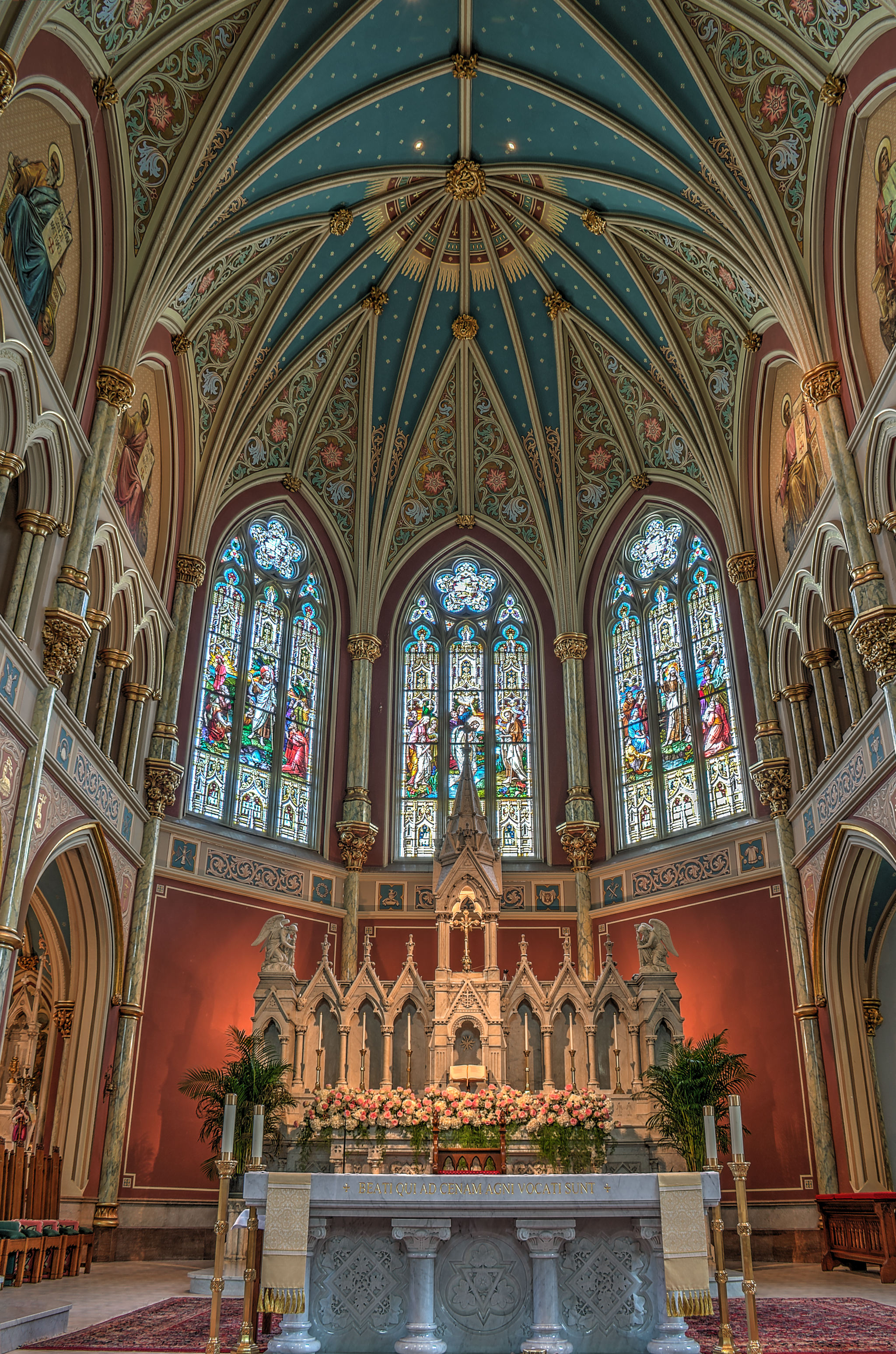
High altar and apse (2015)

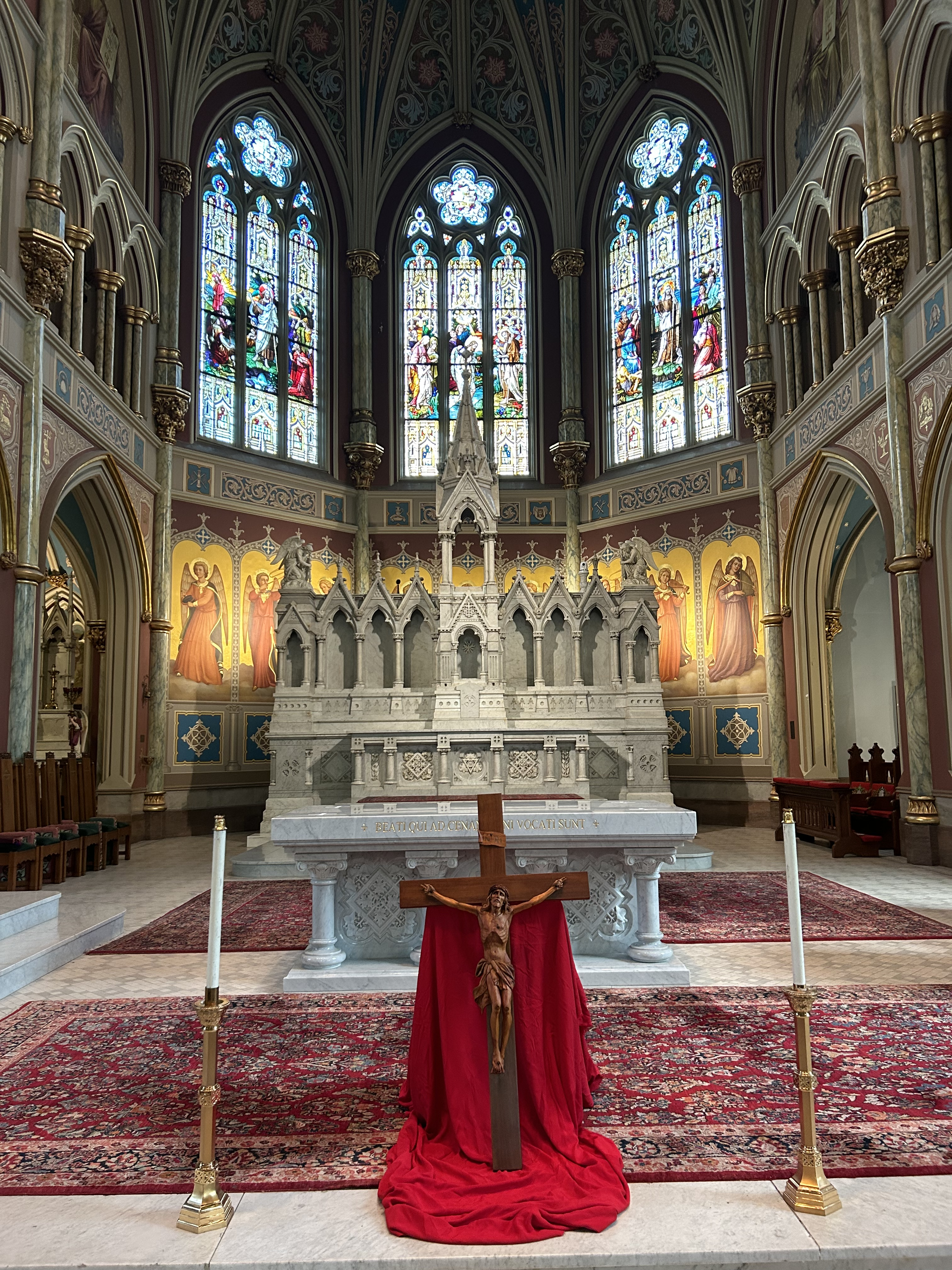
High altar on Holy Friday (2023)

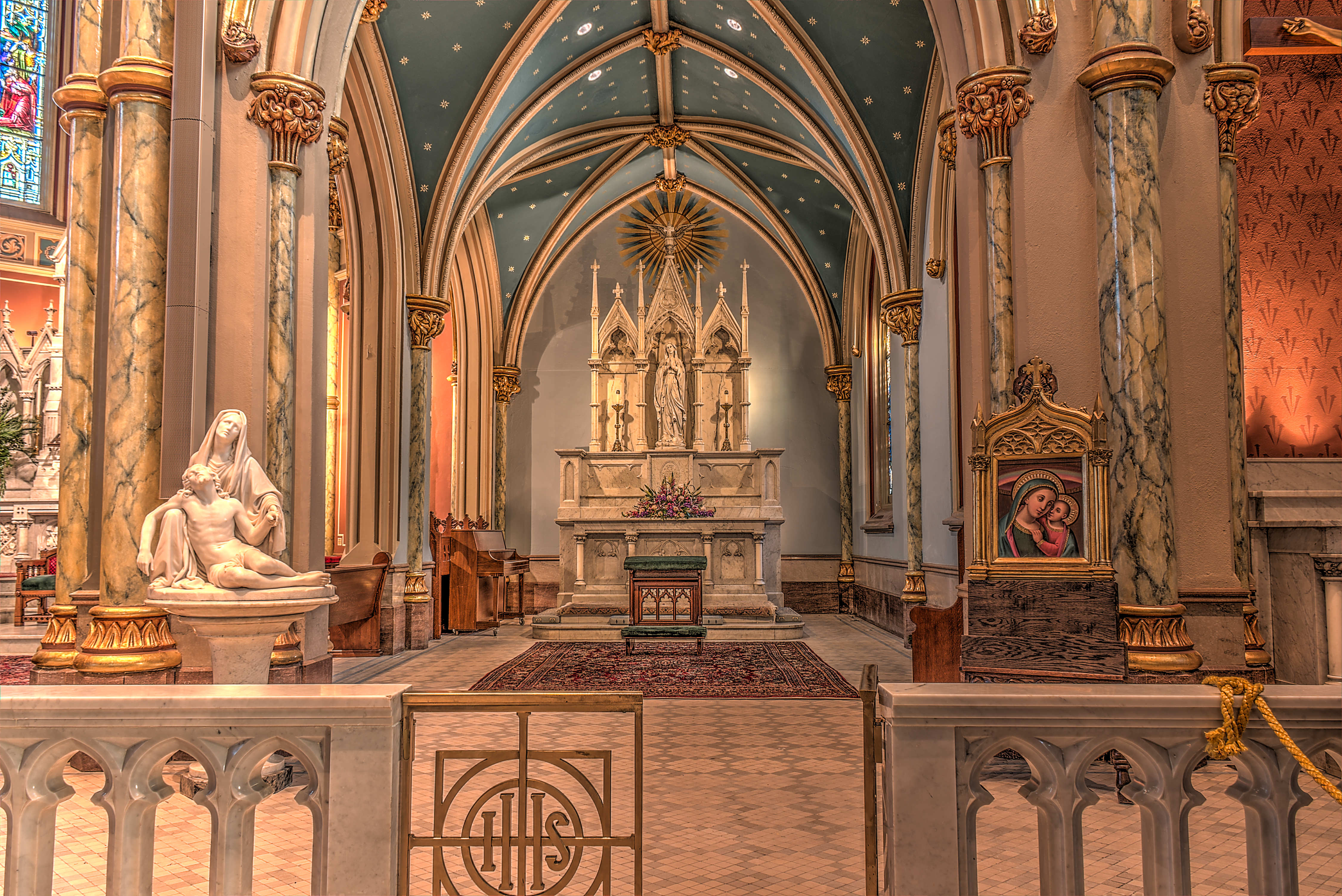
Blessed Virgin Mary Chapel (2021)

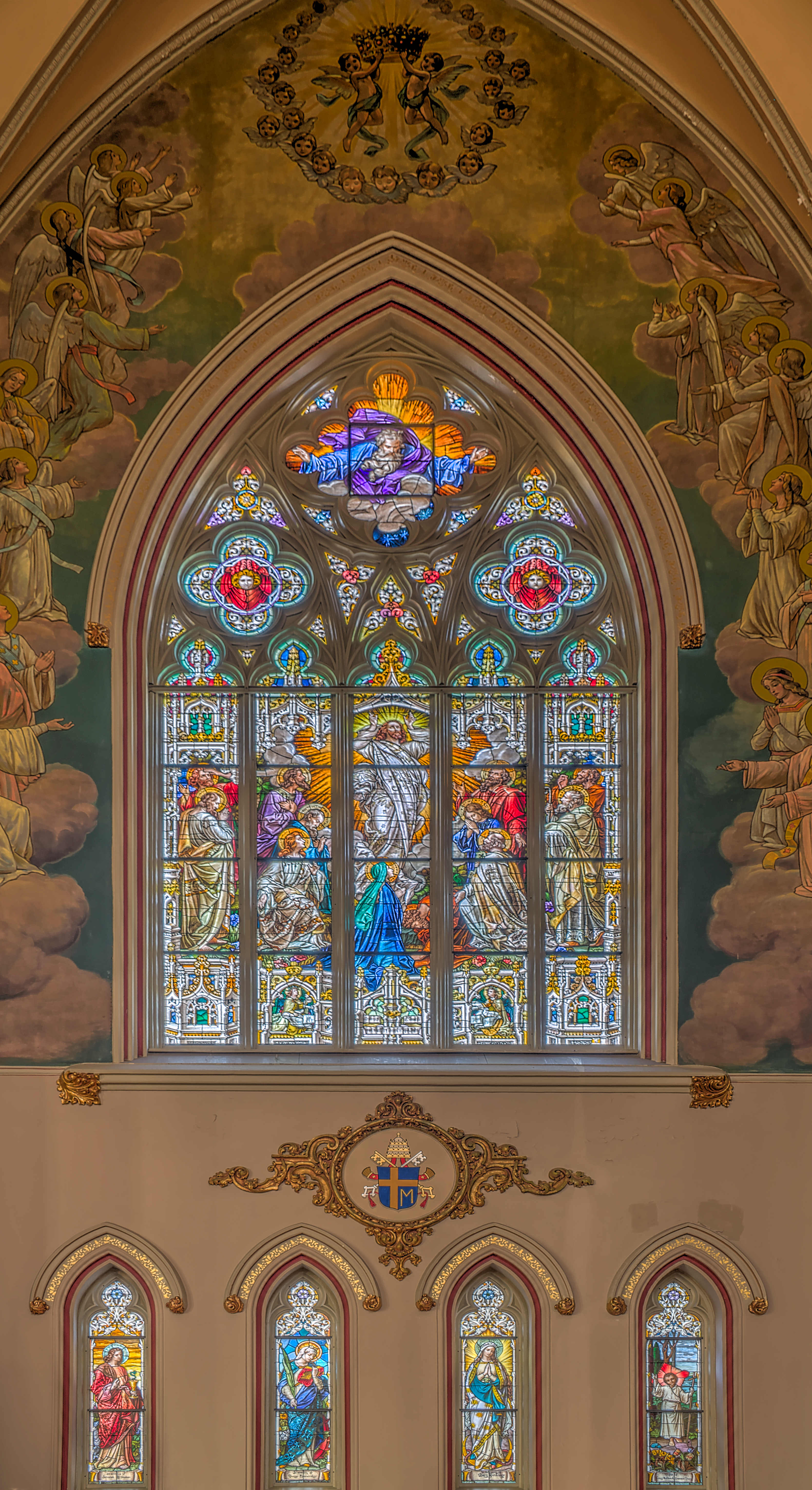
Window and decoration, south transept (2015)

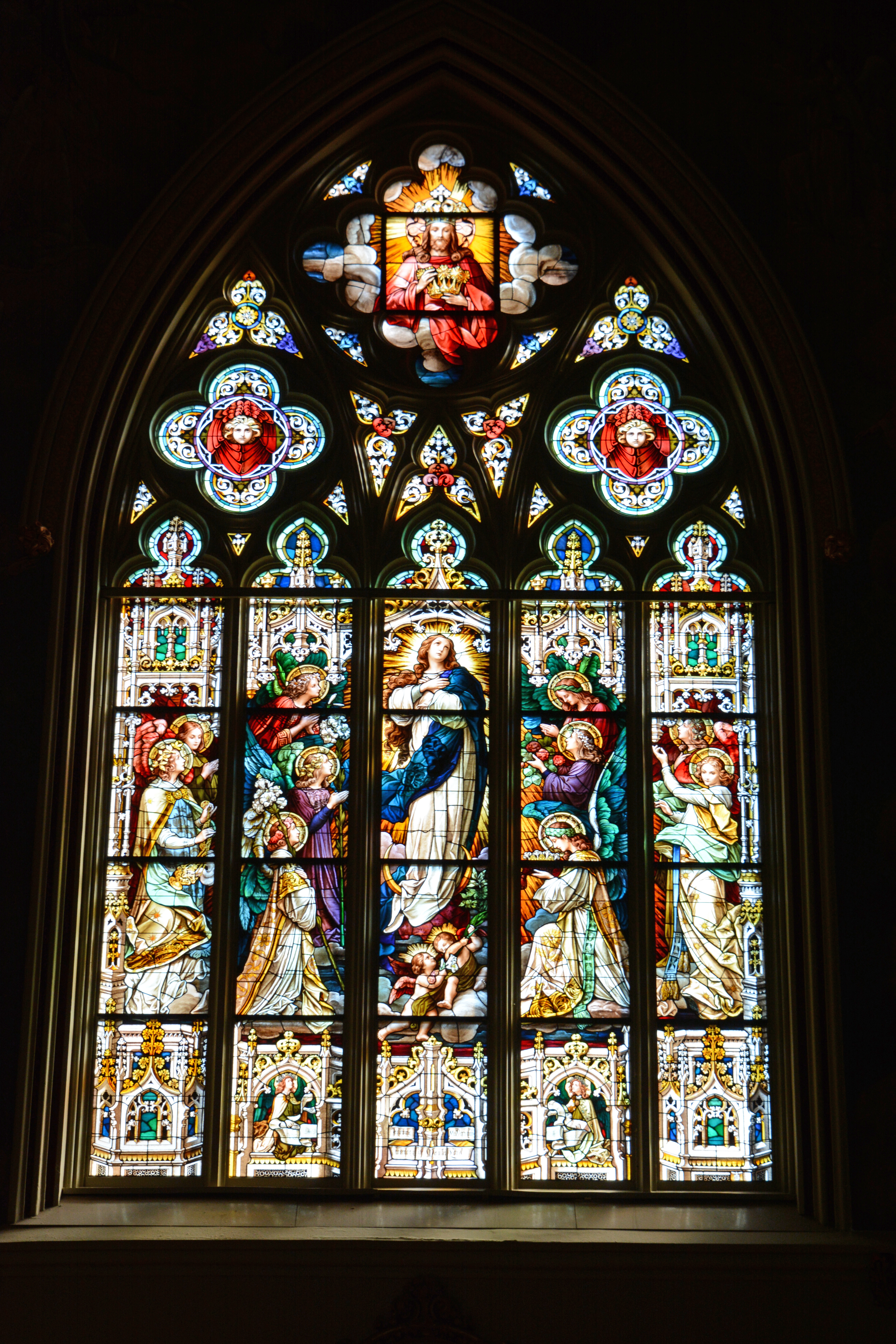
Window detail, south transept (2015)

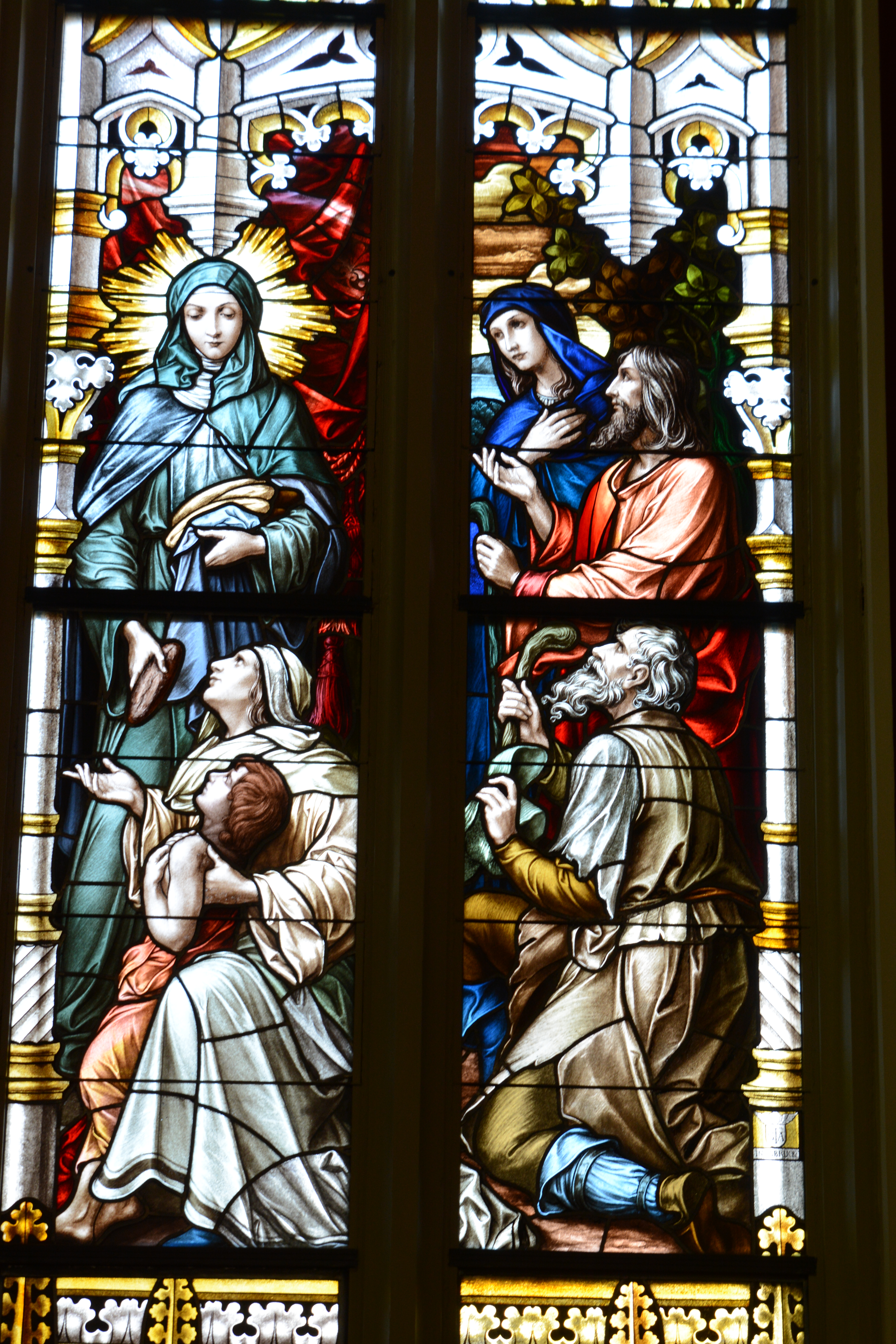
Stained glass detail (2015)

== See also ==
- List of Catholic cathedrals in the United States
- List of cathedrals in the United States
- List of Catholic basilicas
- Buildings in Savannah Historic District
