= Ruth Blair =

American librarian and archivist

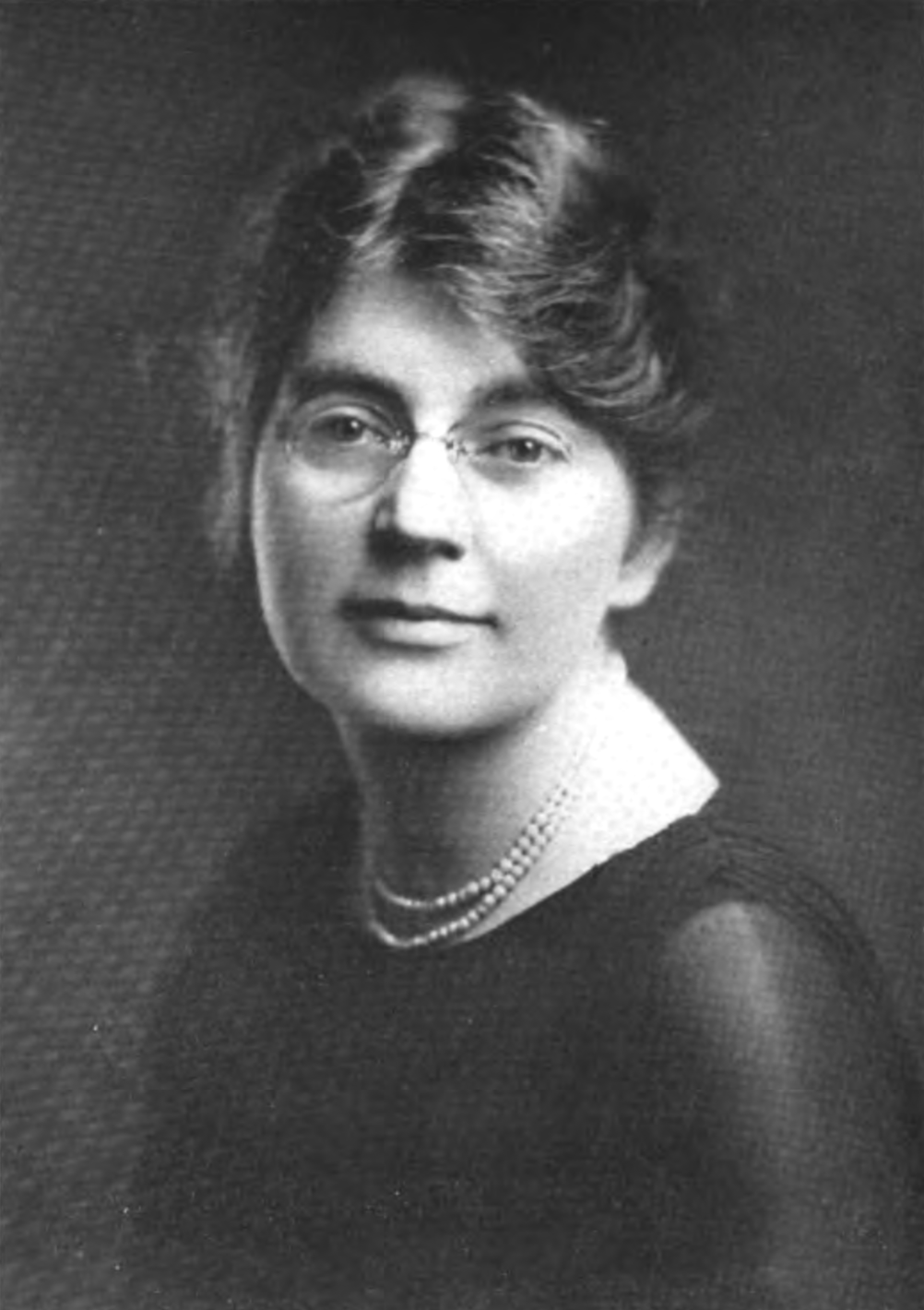
- Blair, c. 1925
- Born: March 17, 1889; Douglas County, Georgia, US
- Died: July 24, 1974 (aged 85)
- Burial place: Austell, Georgia, US
- Occupations: Librarian and archivist
- Years active: 1916–1956

Director of the Georgia Department of Archives and History
- In office January 1, 1925 – January 1, 1937
- Preceded by: Lucian Lamar Knight
- Succeeded by: Louise Frederick Hays

Ruth Blair (March 17, 1889 – July 24, 1974) was an American librarian and archivist in the U.S. state of Georgia. She was the first woman state historian of Georgia and the first executive secretary of the Atlanta Historical Society. She helped organize the Society of American Archivists in 1936. Named Atlanta's Woman of the Year in 1955, she has been called "one of the most distinguished archivists in America".

== Early life ==
Ruth Blair was born in Douglas County, Georgia, on March 17, 1889, to Hiram Columbus Blair and Nancy Ann Blair (née Mozley). Her father was born in 1836 and served in the Confederate Army; her mother was born in 1851. She had two immediate siblings, Lillian and Hiram Jr. Her father was a successful farmer and briefly represented Douglas County in the Georgia General Assembly. Her father also had been married once before, and thus she had eight half-siblings including Daniel Webster Blair, who was a superior court judge.

After her father's death in 1901, the family moved to Lithia Springs, Georgia. Blair attended Austell High School and Cox College and also was privately tutored for two years. She also took night classes in journalism from Georgia School of Technology professors and correspondence courses in English, history and art from Emory University.

== Career ==
Blair started her first job with the state of Georgia as assistant reference librarian of the Georgia State Library on February 7, 1916. She had no formal training as a librarian, so she learned on the job under the first woman Georgia state librarian, Maud Barker Cobb. She was promoted to legislative librarian in September 1918. She worked at the state library for several years, but she had to resign in late 1919 due to personal and family illnesses. Her mother died in early 1920.

=== Georgia Department of Archives and History ===
On January 1, 1921, she resumed her career at the newly created Georgia Department of Archives and History as a secretary under Lucian Lamar Knight. Knight described her as his "able assistant" and a "trained investigator with a peculiar gift for organization". Knight arranged for Blair to spend a week at the state archive in Boston in June 1922 to study their methods.

In 1924, as his six-year term was ending, Knight declined re-election by the Georgia Historical Commission due to ill health. Knight "strongly recommended" Blair as his successor. She faced competition from two other candidates: Mildred Lewis Rutherford and educator Charles M. Neel. Blair prevailed by a vote of seven to three. On January 1, 1925 she succeeded Knight as director of the department and as state historian of Georgia, the first woman to do so. She was one of just a few women, including Marie Bankhead Owen and Margaret Cross Norton, who had achieved such a position in the U.S. up to that date. The Atlanta Constitution hailed her appointment as an honor paid to the women of Georgia and harbinger of "the woman's age".

She was responsible for compiling Georgia's Official Register for 1925 through 1931. She also edited and published other publications through the department. However, during her second term the pace of publication slowed due to lack of funds.

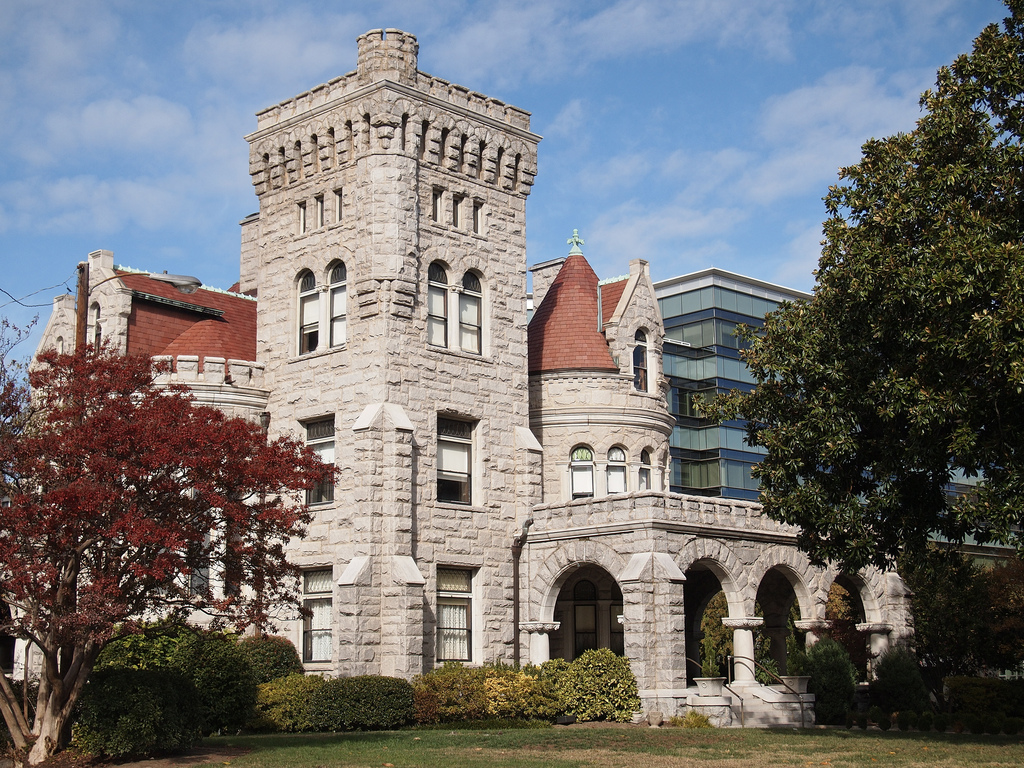
Rhodes Hall

The space allotted to the department at the Georgia State Capitol had been limited. Although it had been expanded in 1925, Blair campaigned for a better location for the department and its collections. Through personal connections she secured the donation of the former Amos G. Rhodes home on Peachtree Street to the state for this purpose. The twenty-room stone mansion contained stained glass windows dedicated to the Confederacy. The building was renamed Rhodes Memorial Hall, and the state formally accepted the gift in 1929.

One of the conditions of the transfer was that the home always be occupied. Blair fulfilled this requirement by moving into the home with her bachelor brother Hiram. The formal opening took place on May 10, 1930. Two of the rooms of the house were dedicated to local historical and patriotic societies including the Atlanta Historical Society, the United Daughters of the Confederacy, and the Daughters of 1812, among others. Regular open house events were held that helped publicize the work of the department and occasionally raise additional funds for its work.

In August 1929, the Georgia General Assembly called upon each of the state's counties to appoint a historian to compile a history of their county for the upcoming bicentennial of the state in 1932. Blair worked closely with the county historians to train and advise them.

In May 1933, Blair was the only woman on a 21-member committee created by Joseph Henry Beale to organize the American Legal History Society. In March 1936 she was one of two women on a 10-member committee to organize the Society of American Archivists (SAA). She was elected one of the five councilors of that newly formed organization.

In 1935, alongside ten other noted women, including Martha McChesney Berry, Annie Jump Cannon, Caroline Pafford Miller, and Florence Sabin, she was given an honorary Master of Public Service by Oglethorpe University.

During her second term as state historian, threats of budget cuts and reorganization of the department forced Blair to lobby for her department's independence at the capitol and solicit the assistance of outside groups. She was successful, but she decided she didn't have a future at the department. Blair left her job as State Historian at the end of 1936, after two six-year terms, and was succeeded by Louise Frederick Hays.

During her two terms, Blair had paved the way for other women, including Mary G. Bryan, who began as Blair's assistant but became state archivist in 1951 and was the fifteenth president of SAA.

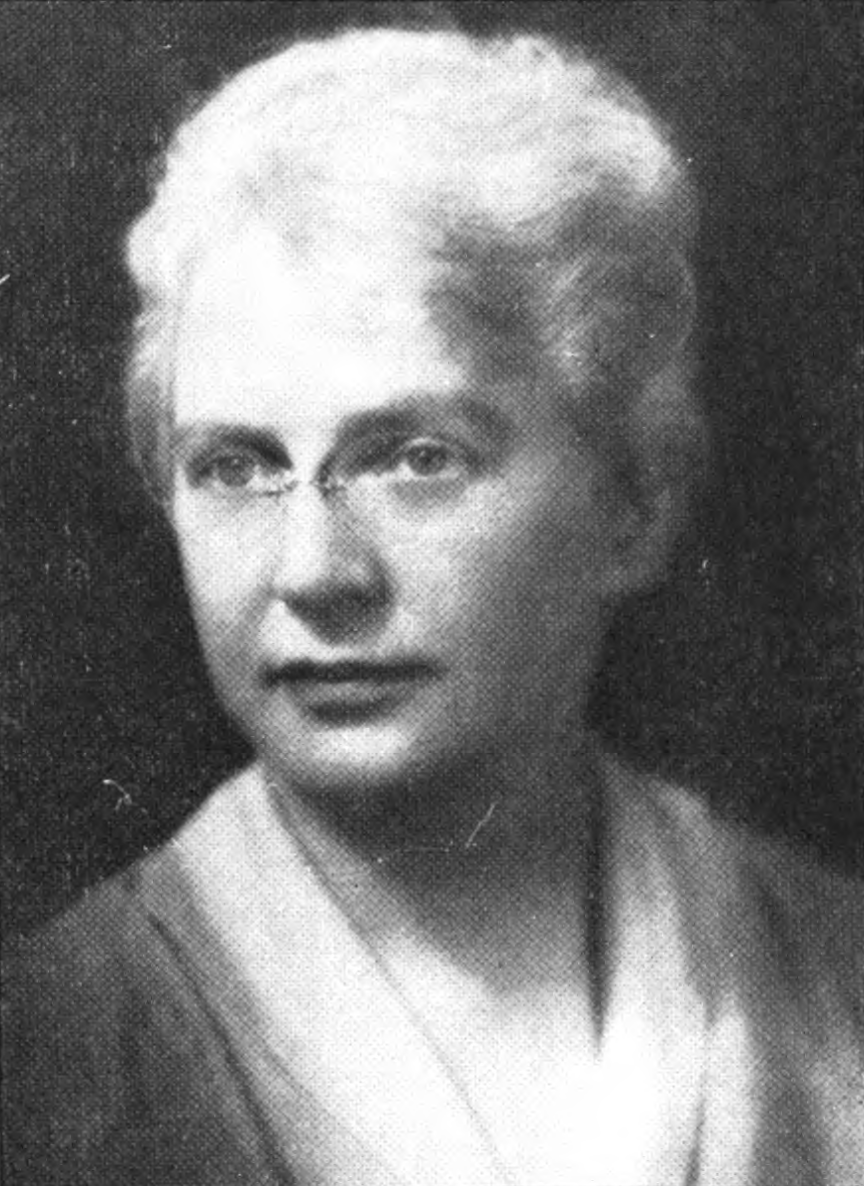
Blair, c. 1937

=== Atlanta Historical Society ===
Blair was a founding member and secretary-treasurer of the Atlanta Historical Society starting at its founding in 1926. In those days it was organized "socially". On January 1, 1937, she became the first executive secretary of the Atlanta organization, actively managing it as a full-time employee.

It was intended her hiring would invigorate the organization. One early change was issuing their publication Atlanta Historical Journal more regularly. Fund-raising drives were held, and plans were made for the organization to obtain a permanent building in place of offices they had rented previously. Blair set about curating a large collection of records and artifacts that would later be displayed at the Atlanta History Center.

If we are to sell Atlanta we must first know Atlanta. I think the Chamber of Commerce, the Convention and Tourist Bureau and other such organizations would render a great service if they would put more emphasis on the importance of Atlantans knowing more about their city.

— Ruth Blair, Atlanta Constitution, September 3, 1939

In 1942, she helped plan a celebration of the 100th anniversary of Marthasville (Atlanta's original name), including designing a commemorative set of coffee cups for the occasion.

In 1946, the organization purchased the former Willis B. Jones home (designed by Neel Reid), and once again Blair supervised an organization's move into a former home on Peachtree Street. This mansion contained 10 rooms and had plenty of room for the society's collection. The new headquarters was officially opened on April 19, 1947.

In 1955, Blair was still in charge when the organization reached 1,000 paid members, up from 44 members in the early days. She achieved this without an assistant of her own until 1955.

Blair retired in April 1956 and was succeeded as the head of the Atlanta Historical Society by Allen P. Julian.

== Personal life and death ==
In 1919, she became involved in women's suffrage, as Atlanta granted women the right to vote in municipal primaries that year. In May she was one of the first 400 women who signed up to qualify to vote. She later attended local League of Women Voters meetings with her cousin, Mrs. Sanford Gay.

Blair was a member of the Daughters of the American Revolution and a curator of the Georgia Historical Society.

Blair traveled extensively, visiting Great Britain in 1928, including Ireland, Wales, and Scotland. She also traveled to Canada, Cuba, Bermuda, Mexico and several Central American countries.

Blair never married. She died on July 24, 1974, aged 85, in Austell, Georgia; she is buried there.

== Publications ==
- Blair, Ruth (1926). Georgia Women of 1926. Atlanta GA: Georgia Dept. of Archives and History. OCLC 3831135 – via HathiTrust.
- Blair, Ruth (1926). Some Early Tax Digests of Georgia (1790–1818). Atlanta GA: Georgia Dept. of Archives and History. OCLC 866014937.
- Blair, Ruth (1928). Revolutionary Soldiers' Receipts for Georgia Bounty Grants. Atlanta GA: Foote and Davies. OCLC 769035483.
- Blair, Ruth (October 1940). "Atlanta's Monuments". Atlanta Historical Bulletin. V (23). Atlanta Historical Society: 273–277 – via Atlanta History Center.
