= Atlanta History Center =

History museum and research center in Georgia, US

Coordinates: 33.84282°N 84.38573°W

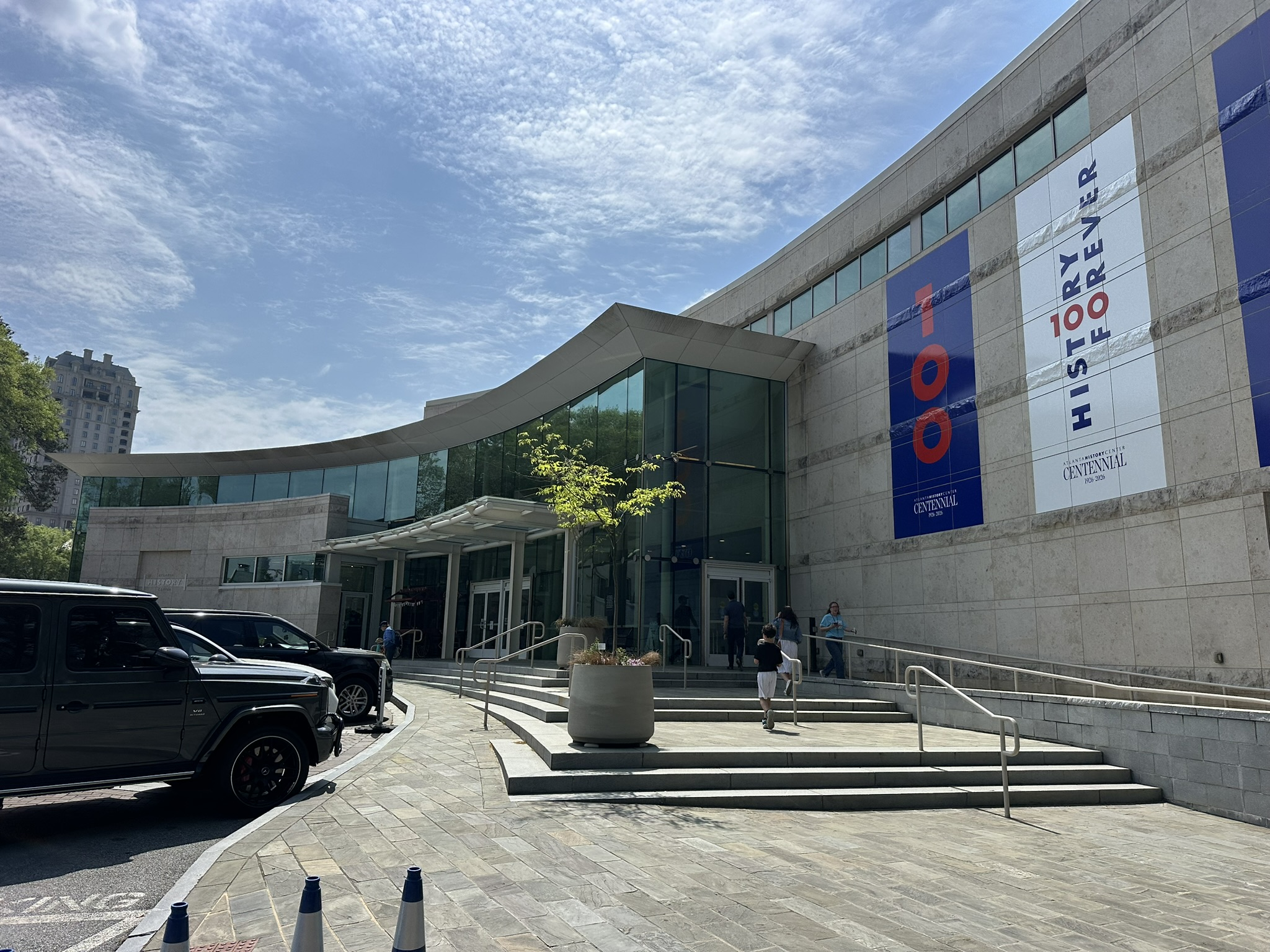
- Atlanta History Center entrance

- Location within Atlanta
- Established: 1926
- Location: 130 West Paces Ferry Road
- Type: History
- Accreditation: American Alliance of Museums
- CEO: F. Sheffield Hale
- Owner: Atlanta Historical Society
- Parking: On site (no charge)
- Website: atlantahistorycenter.com

The Atlanta History Center is an American history museum and research center located in the Buckhead district of Atlanta, Georgia. The Museum was founded in 1926, and has a large campus featuring historic gardens and houses, including Swan House, Smith Farm, and Wood Family Cabin. Atlanta History Center's Midtown Campus includes the Margaret Mitchell House & Museum. Atlanta History Center is one of the largest history museums in the Southeast.

== History ==
The Atlanta History Center was founded and chartered in 1926 as the Atlanta Historical Society by Walter McElreath. The vice president was Joel Hunter, and the secretary-treasurer was Ruth Blair, then the Georgia state archivist. Its stated purpose was to preserve historical sources relating to Atlanta, study Atlanta's history, and promote historical interest in Atlanta. The organization met occasionally in member's homes, collected dues, and began a small collection of historical items. It began to intermittently publish Atlanta Historical Bulletin in 1927, of which the last edition was published in 2006.

The first meetings not held in private homes occurred A. G. Rhodes estate offered them rooms and storage space in its castle around 1929. The organization was reorganized in 1936, and Ruth Blair was hired as a full-time executive secretary. Enough money was raised to rent a ground floor room in the Atlanta Biltmore Hotel in the mid-1930s, and after that was outgrown, a space in the Erlanger Theater Building in 1937. In an attempt to fulfill longstanding plans of a permanent home, the society purchased an empty lot on a street corner in 1940, but all construction soon halted because of World War II. After the war ended, with construction still at a halt, the organization used its increasingly full coffers in 1946 to purchase the Willis B. Jones home, which they rechristened the McElreath hall. The purchase was motivated by a need for a larger space in which to store and display the organization's large collection of artifacts and photos. A second employee was hired in 1948.

When Walter McElreath died in 1965, his estate provided the society with a large influx of money (about $5,000,000) and it began to publish its bulletin regularly. Because of parking difficulties caused by the city's growth, and the cost of maintenance on the Jones home, the society began looking for a new home. In 1966 the group used money from Walter McElreath's estate to purchase the 23-acre Edward H. Inmann estate, including the Swan House and several other buildings. This attracted a significant amount of public interest and volunteering. In 1967, Mills B Lane arranged with the society to pay to move the Tullie Smith House from its original location on to the property, replacing the Inmann barn. The organization built a main building on the estate between 1972 and 1975, which was also named the McElreath Hall.

In 1986 the still relatively small group received the DuBose Collection of Civil War artifacts, donated by Mrs. Beverly M. DuBose Jr. In 1989, the Atlanta Historical Society built the current museum to house the DuBose collection.

In 1990, the Atlanta Historical Society was renamed Atlanta History Center. The $15 million museum opened in 1993 with five exhibitions, including its first signature Atlanta history exhibition, Metropolitan Frontiers. An $11 million expansion, finished in 1996, added two new permanent exhibitions. The Kenan Research Center library was later expanded and the gardens reorganized, with a fourth permanent exhibition added, Down the Fairway with Bobby Jones.

In 2014, the city of Atlanta announced its intentions to relocate the Battle of Atlanta Cyclorama and its artifacts to Atlanta History Center, including the antebellum Western & Atlantic locomotive, the Texas. The museum constructed an expansion to house the 360-degree panoramic painting, as well as the Texas locomotive, and other pieces in the Cyclorama collection. After a careful restoration, the Battle of Atlanta Cyclorama opened to the public February 22, 2019.

In 2018, Atlanta's Zero Mile Post was moved to the Atlanta History Center.

== See also ==
- Georgia Governor’s Mansion
- Jimmy Carter Library and Museum
- List of historical societies in Georgia (U.S. state)
- National Center for Civil and Human Rights
