= OK Cafe =

Restaurant in Atlanta, Georgia, US

Coordinates: 33°50′56″N 84°25′46″W

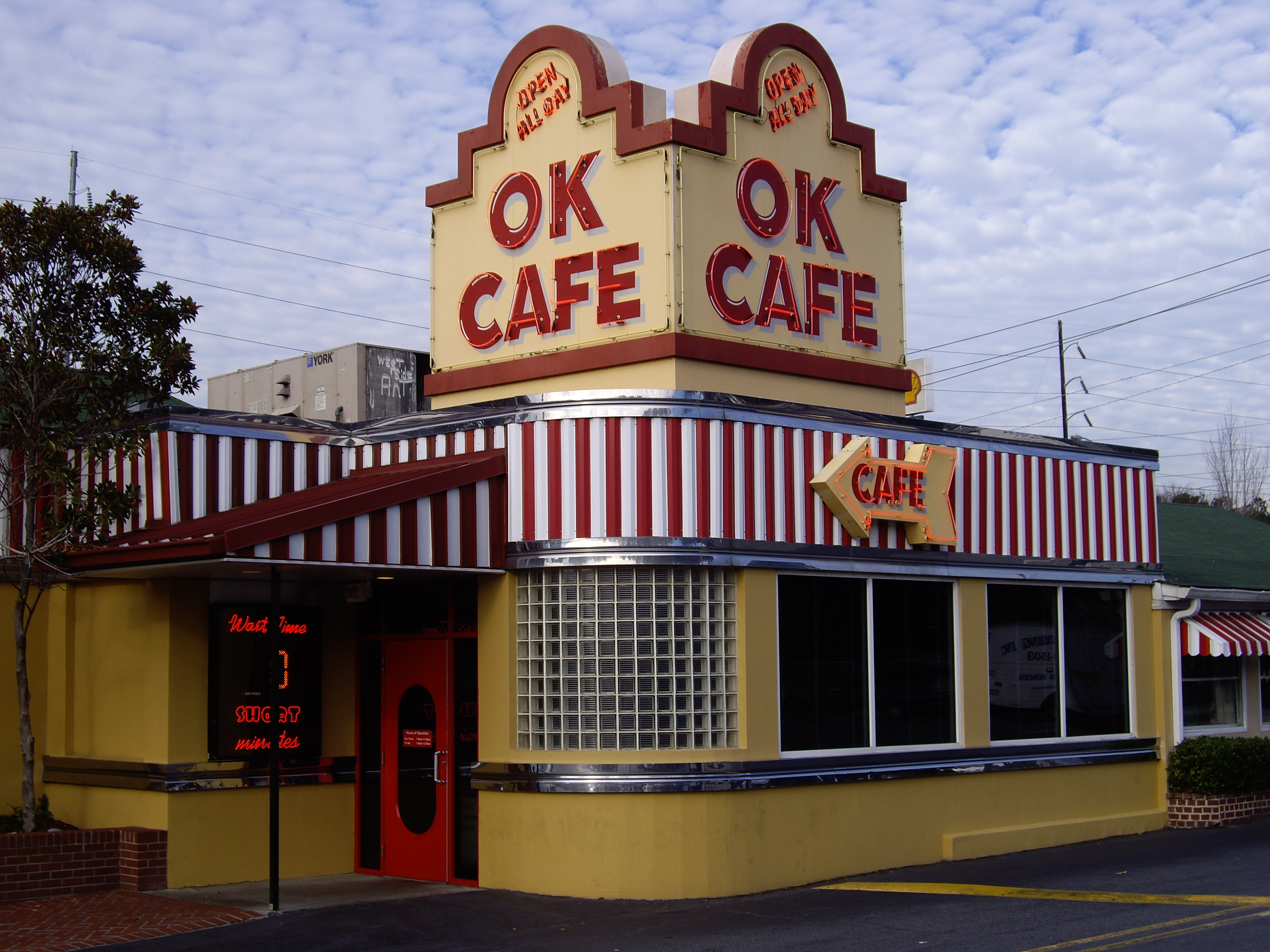
OK Cafe, Atlanta GA

OK Cafe, founded in 1987, is a restaurant in Atlanta, Georgia, that serves breakfast, lunch, and dinner every day. The restaurant, known for its Southern comfort food, has been featured in Forbes, Southern Living, and Ladies Home Journal. In a review of OK Cafe, Atlanta Intown wrote, "Time stands still at the OK Cafe. It’s predictable, delivering all the comfort foods of Southern living that this restaurant has perfected over its very many years as an Atlanta landmark."

== Controversies ==
=== Flag controversy ===
Until mid-2020, OK Cafe prominently displayed the former flag of Georgia in its dining room, which contains the Confederate battle flag. Despite being perceived as a racist celebration of the Confederacy, the restaurant kept the flag for years. After previously defending the presence of the flag, owner Susan DeRose took the flag down in June 2020.

Former flag of the state of Georgia on display in the OK Cafe dining room until 2020

=== Protests ===
In response to a youth-organised Black Lives Matter protest known as Buckhead4BlackLives organised near the cafe that marched towards the Georgia Governor's Mansion in June 2020 in the wake of the murder of George Floyd, the cafe put on display a sign that read "Lives That Matter Are Made With Positive Purpose," an apparent attempt to counter-protest the student-led protest, which had roughly 2,000–3,000 attendees, including former Atlanta Falcons head coach Dan Quinn and radio personality Frank Ski. In addition, signs that read "Law & Order = Peace" and "OK Cafe loves America" were also put on display by the Cafe. Cafe Owner Susan DeRose defended her counter protest, expressing that she was "offended" by the Black Lives Matter protest, whose organizers she referred to as "spoiled children."

== Fire ==
In December 2014, the restaurant was damaged in a fire and did not reopen until October of the following year. A firefighter suffered minor injuries from a fall suffered during the cleanup of the restaurant following the fire.
