= McElreath =

McElreath is a surname. Notable people with the surname include:

- Jim McElreath (1928–2017), American racing driver in the USAC and CART
- Richard McElreath (born 1973), American professor of anthropology
- Walter McElreath (1867–1951), American lawyer, legislator, and bank executive
