= Thomas Bradbury =

Thomas Bradbury may refer to:

- Thomas Bradbury (cricketer) (1859–1917), English cricketer
- Tom Bradbury (born 1998), English professional footballer
- Thomas Bradbury (minister) (1677–1759), English Dissenting minister
- A. Thomas Bradbury (1902–1992), American architect
- Thomas Bradbury (MP) for City of London (Parliament of England constituency)
