= Havertys =

American furnishing company

Haverty Furniture Companies, Inc.
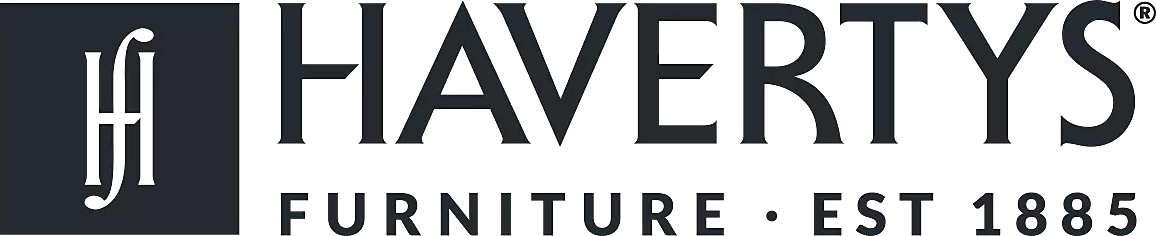

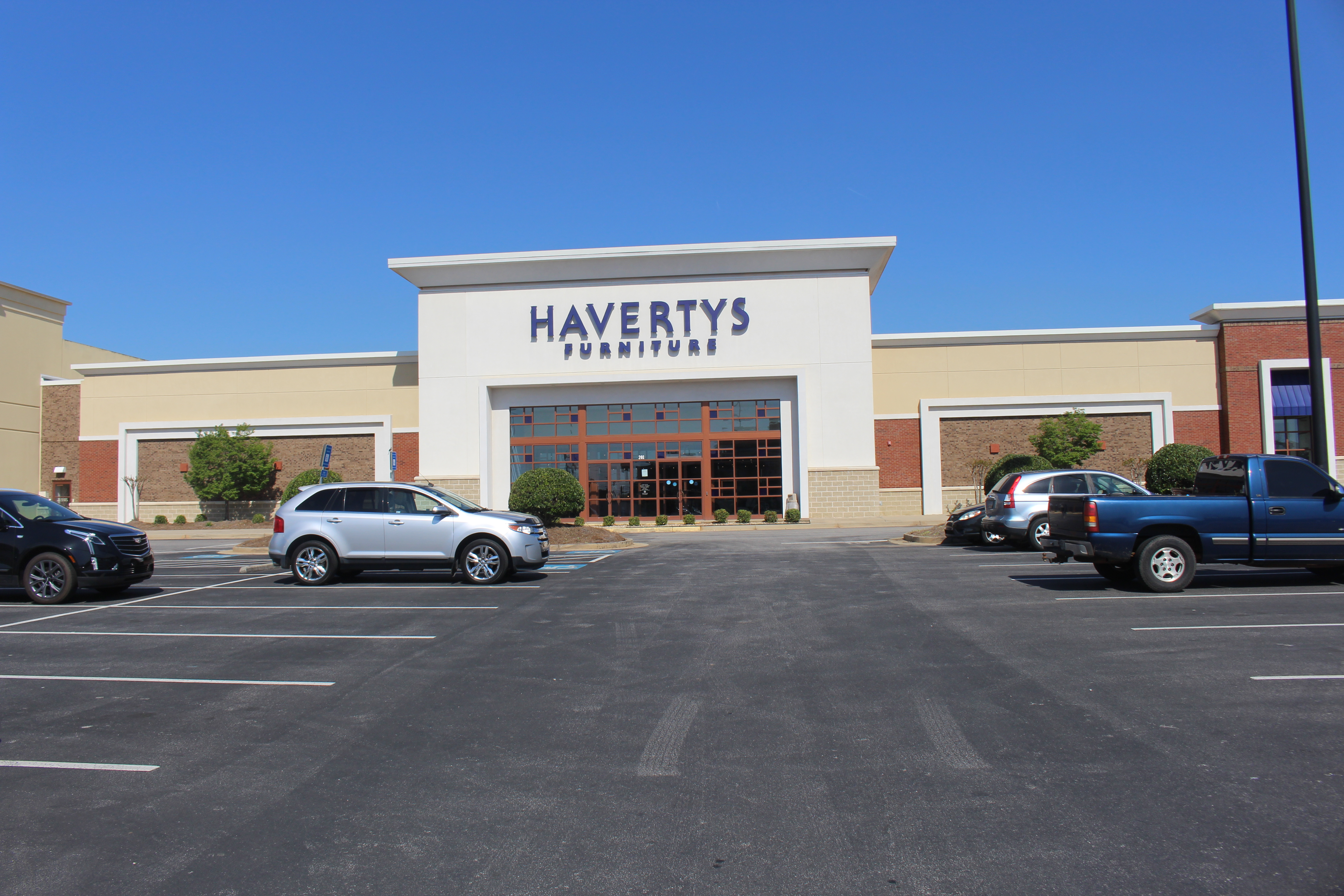
- Havertys location in McDonough, Georgia in 2024
- Type: Public
- Traded as: NYSE: HVT
- Industry: Furniture
- Founded: 1885; 141 years ago
- Founder: J. J. Haverty
- Headquarters: Atlanta, Georgia, U.S.
- Number of locations: 121 (16 states) (2019)
- Key people: Clarence H. Smith, chairman, president and CEO
- Revenue: ▼US$802.29 million (2019)
- Net income: ▼US$21.865 million (2019)
- Total assets: ▲US$560.07 million (2019)
- Total equity: ▼US$260.5 million (2019)
- Number of employees: 3,425 (2019)
- Website: havertys.com

Haverty Furniture Companies, Inc. ("Havertys") is an American retail furniture company founded in 1885. Beginning with a single store in downtown Atlanta, it has grown to become one of the top furniture retailers in the south and central United States.

== History ==
Havertys was founded by James Joseph (J.J.) Haverty and his brother Michael in 1885. The first store was located at 14 East Hunter Street (now 117 Martin Luther King Jr. Drive) in Atlanta, Georgia. By the third year, the new company moved to a larger location.

In 1889, J.J. and Michael entered a partnership with the owner of a neighboring furniture store, Amos G. Rhodes, forming the Rhodes-Haverty Furniture Company. A year and a half after the first Rhodes-Haverty store opened, J.J. Haverty moved westward to St. Louis, Missouri with his family to expand, and soon after bought interest in a number of smaller showrooms. It was not until 1894 that J.J. returned his family to Atlanta and went on the road to open more stores. By 1908, 17 stores were open and thriving.

J.J. Haverty's son Clarence, who first began in the business by sweeping floors, rose to a leadership position and wished for a larger role in the business. The partnership with Rhodes was dissolved amicably and, with the flip of a coin, 16 of the stores were divided between Rhodes and Haverty. The main Atlanta location was purchased outright by J.J. Haverty and the business took back its original name of Haverty Furniture Company.

Following the split with Rhodes, the company expanded across the South. The Atlanta headquarters outgrew their facility and moved to a larger six-story building in 1924. Also during this period, J.J. Haverty and Amos Rhodes formed another partnership, this time to erect the Rhodes-Haverty Building, which would remain Atlanta's tallest structure until 1954.

In the late 1920s, the company took advantage of the booming stock market and went public. The stock sale took place on October 1, 1929. Four weeks later, the market crashed. Havertys' strong financial positions enabled the company to weather the difficult years ahead.

Clarence Haverty, who had run the business for many years, was officially named president in 1938, at which time his father J.J. became chairman of the board. In October 1939, just short of his 81st birthday, founder J.J. Haverty died.

In December 1941, the United States entered World War II and the company's business struggled due to the rationing of furniture production materials. When the war ended, pent-up demand for consumer goods caused sales to surge. The company seized the opportunity to remodel older stores and open new locations. Clarence Haverty's son, Rawson, returned from war and assumed the position of Corporate Secretary.

The company continued to prosper during the 1950s. By 1955, there were 38 stores across ten states. Clarence Haverty decided to step down as president and Rawson took on the role. By 1960, the year of the company's 75th anniversary, Havertys added four more locations. That year also saw the death of Clarence Haverty at the age of 79.

By the end of the 1960s, retail trends were changing and downtown stores were replaced by stores closer to the growing suburban populations. Rawson Haverty led the company through this transition as president and chief executive officer until 1984, when he was elected as chairman of the board. Another of the founder's grandsons, Frank McGaughey, Jr., who had been with the company since 1947, accepted the title of president.

In the late 1980s, Havertys embarked upon a comprehensive revitalization program, upgrading most of the company's stores. Enhanced lighting and display areas were the primary improvements, with some stores also expanding in size. The revitalization included closing the last downtown Atlanta store. Havertys remained the area's largest furniture retailer, with locations distributed throughout the metropolitan area.

Frank McGaughey, Jr. added CEO to his title in addition to president in 1990. He held this post until his retirement in 1994, when John E. Slater was named president and CEO. Slater joined the company in 1956 and had spent his entire career with Havertys.

In August 1998, the company's stock listing moved from the NASDAQ Exchange to the New York Stock Exchange.

As Havertys witnessed the turn of another century, the company underwent many changes. An initiative began to develop Havertys' own brand of furniture, starting with just a few items in February 2000. Most of the company's sales volume is now of merchandise exclusively designed, sourced and produced under the Havertys brand.

Progress continued and 100 stores were in business by the beginning of 2001, when the furniture retailer saw another change in leadership. Rawson Haverty retired from the board and took the title chairman emeritus. Grandson of J.J. Haverty, Clarence (Clancy) H. Ridley, elected to the board of directors in 1979, took Rawson's place as chairman of the board. Clancy provided continuity and guidance when J.J.'s great-grandson Clarence H. Smith, who spent his entire career experiencing all facets of the company, became president and CEO in 2002. Rawson Haverty continued to attend board meetings until his death in 2007 at the age of 86. Frank MaGaughey, Jr. also died soon after in 2008 at the age of 84.

Growth of the internet presented Havertys with another opportunity and in 2007 the company revamped the website. By March 2008, customers could browse through products and make purchases online.

In 2002, Havertys built their southeastern distribution center in Braselton, Georgia. Since then, it has grown to more than 800,000 sq. ft.

The year 2010 marked yet another change for company leadership as L. Phillip Humann succeeded Clancy Ridley as chairman of the board. Clancy was elected chairman emeritus.

In 2012, President and CEO Clarence H. Smith, who had been a member of the board of directors since 1989, succeeded L. Phillip Humann as chairman of the board. Mr. Humann remains a member of the board, as lead director.

Havertys has expanded to three distribution centers to support over 100 showrooms in 16 states.

== Key dates ==
1885: First store opened by J.J. Haverty and his brother Michael
1889: Partnership with Amos G. Rhodes to form Rhodes-Haverty Furniture
1908: J.J. Haverty and son Clarence split with Rhodes and re-establish Haverty Furniture Co
1929: Company went public as Haverty Furniture Companies, Inc.
1938: Clarence Haverty became president
1955: Clarence Haverty's son, Rawson, appointed president
1984: J.J. Haverty's grandson, Frank McGaughey, Jr., named president
1994: Jay E. Slater became president
1998: Stock moved to New York Stock Exchange
1999: 100th store opened
2000: Launch of own brand of furniture
2001: Clarence H. Smith, J.J.'s great-grandson, named president
2008: First online sale

== Community service ==
Over the years, Havertys has contributed time, labor, money and furnishings to national causes such as United Way, American Red Cross, the American Cancer Foundation, the American Heart Association and many more.

In 2010, the company became a national sponsor of the American Cancer Society: Making Strides Against Breast Cancer walk.

Furnishings and accessories were donated to families featured on Extreme Makeover: Home Edition. In several instances, local employees volunteered their time to help in the process.

In the Atlanta area, Havertys has made an impact on the High Museum of Art, MARTA, Saint Joseph's Hospital and many charities associated with the Catholic Archdiocese of Atlanta.

== Environmental impact ==
Havertys has invested $750,000 in equipment that recycles approximately 4,000 tons of corrugated material and 120 tons of Styrofoam each year. A line of eco-friendly furniture with innovative elements designed to leave a smaller environmental footprint was introduced in 2009.
