= Villa Clare =

House in Atlanta, Georgia

Coordinates: 33.810°N 84.394°W

Villa Clare was a house in Atlanta, Georgia located on 2020 Peachtree Road. It was completed in 1916, and was designed by the architect Edward Emmett Dougherty. J.J. Haverty, who hired Dougherty to design the home for himself, named it after County Clare, Ireland, where his wife and father were from. Haverty closed up the house in 1918 when his wife died, but later reopened it after he became interested in art collecting. Haverty collected many paintings in Villa Clare before his death in 1939, and many of these were later donated to the High Museum of Art. The former location of Villa Clare is now the site of the Shepherd Spinal Center.
