= A. Thomas Bradbury =

American architect

- Born: April 4, 1902; Atlanta, Georgia, United States
- Died: November 14, 1992 (aged 90); Atlanta, Georgia, United States
- Education: Georgia School of Technology
- Occupation: Architect
- Children: 3
- Buildings: Georgia Governor's Mansion

Abraham Thomas Bradbury (April 4, 1902 – November 14, 1992) was an American architect best known for his work in Atlanta during the mid-1900s. During this time, he designed many buildings for the government of Georgia around the Georgia State Capitol. His most famous work is arguably the Georgia Governor's Mansion, located in the Buckhead district of the city. While many of his works tended to be in the modernist style, the mansion is a noted example of Greek Revival architecture in Georgia. According to the New Georgia Encyclopedia, he was "perhaps the most prominent architect of government buildings in the mid-twentieth century".

== Biography ==
=== Early life ===
Abraham Thomas Bradbury was born in Atlanta, Georgia, on April 4, 1902, to Abraham Bradbury, a contractor, and Hannah Marco. As a young adult, Bradbury studied architecture at the Georgia School of Technology (Georgia Tech). From 1921 to 1923, while still a student, he worked for the Atlanta-based architectural firm of Robert and Company. In 1923, he completed his education at the school and received a certificate. Following this, he moved to Florida, following fellow architect John Llewellyn Skinner, who had served as the head of architecture at the school from 1923 to 1925 before moving to Florida. While Bradbury had hoped to establish an architectural practice in Miami, a hurricane in 1926 prevented him from doing so.

In 1927, Bradbury found work with the firm of Warren, Knight & Davis in Birmingham, Alabama. By 1930, Bradbury was living in Chattanooga, Tennessee, but he returned to Atlanta in the early 1930s to study law. In 1933, he was admitted to the Georgia Bar Association. In 1934, he returned to work for Robert and Company, and in 1935 he worked for a short time with the firm Hentz, Adler & Schutze. During the mid-1930s, he cofounded the firm of Constantine and Bradbury, though this firm was dissolved in 1939. During this time, Bradbury designed the State Office Building, a government building located near the Georgia State Capitol. Throughout his career, Bradbury would work extensively on commissions for government buildings in the city. Also around this time, in 1936, Bradbury married Janette Lane, who was the chair of the board of trustees for the Atlanta Civic Ballet. Additionally, Lane had both a bachelor's and a master's degree in law. The couple would have three children: Janette Lane, Lynda Lane, and Thomas Lane. Bradbury would later remarry. In 1939, he established his own firm as A. Thomas Bradbury, Architect. Following a brief period in 1942 when the firm became Bradbury and Stockman, by 1943 the firm had been renamed to A. Thomas Bradbury and Associates.

=== Modernist architecture ===
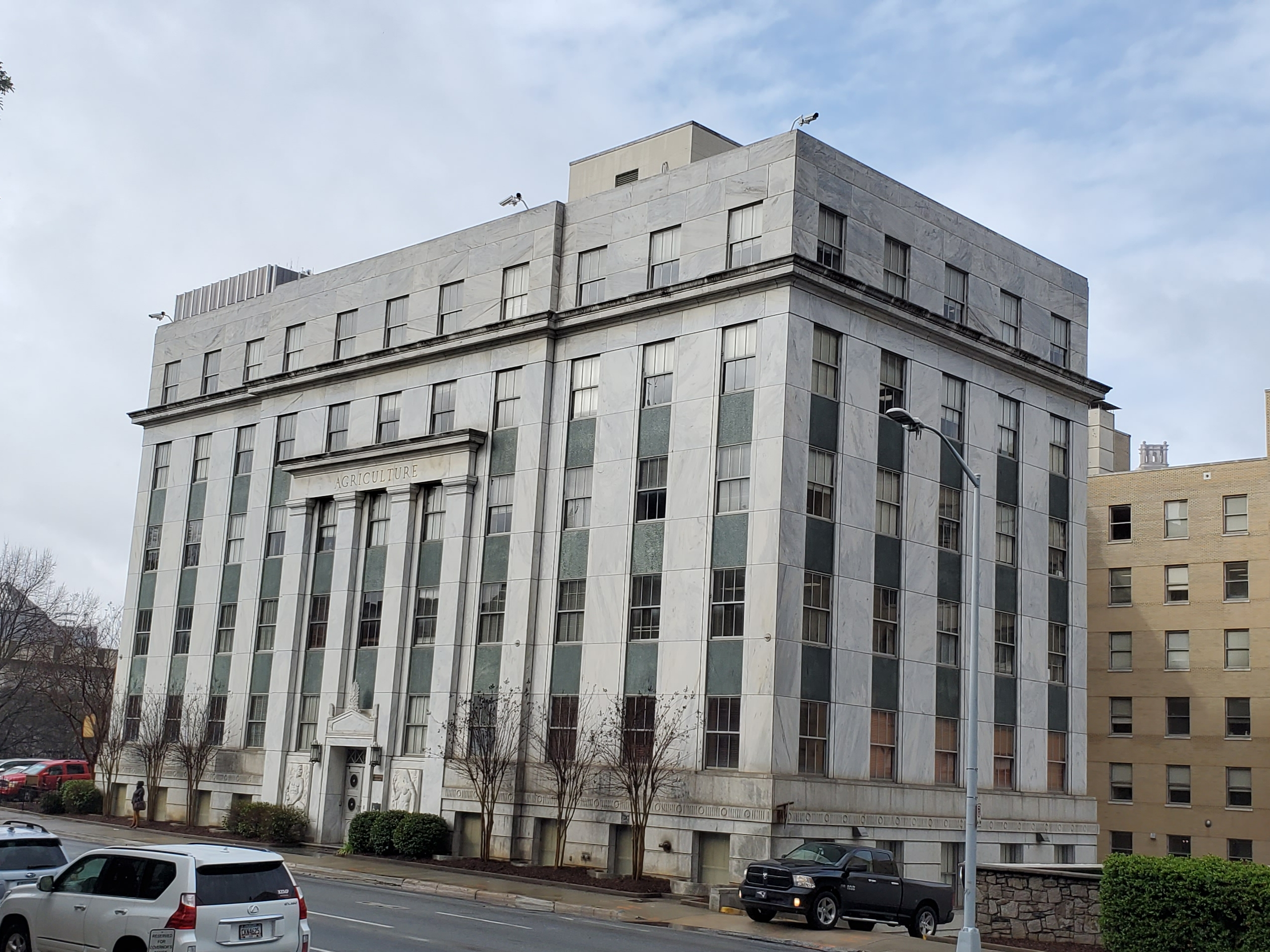
The Agriculture Building in 2020

Going into the 1940s, Bradbury was a strong embracer of modernist architecture, with many of his buildings from this period forward being built in that style. In 1954, Bradbury and Associates were contracted to design the Agriculture Building and the Law and Justice Building for the government of Georgia, with noted Georgia-based artist Julian Hoke Harris providing some sculptural ornamentation for the latter. Throughout the decade, his firm would design several more buildings for other governmental departments around the capitol in the modernist style, with a notable exception being the building for the Georgia Department of Transportation, which was built in a Bauhaus-inspired international style. From the 1950s through the 1960s, Bradbury designed six government buildings in the area, with their modernist style contrasting with the Beaux-Arts style of the capitol building. In 1957, he served as the lead architect for a renovation project to the capitol building itself. Discussing the style of these buildings, architecture critic Robert M. Craig stated that the "prevailing spirit" of the government buildings "was increasingly abstract, a faceless bureaucracy of officialdom deriving its architectural dress from a reduction of building form to colorless wall plane". Also during the 1950s, Bradbury pushed for changes to Georgia Tech's architectural department, specifically regarding its hiring of certain architectural firms. As a result, Bradbury became the lead architect behind several new projects at his alma mater, and in the following decades his firm would design academic buildings throughout the southeastern United States, arguably most notably the Georgia Mental Health Institute at Emory University.

=== Georgia Archives and the Georgia Governor's Mansion ===
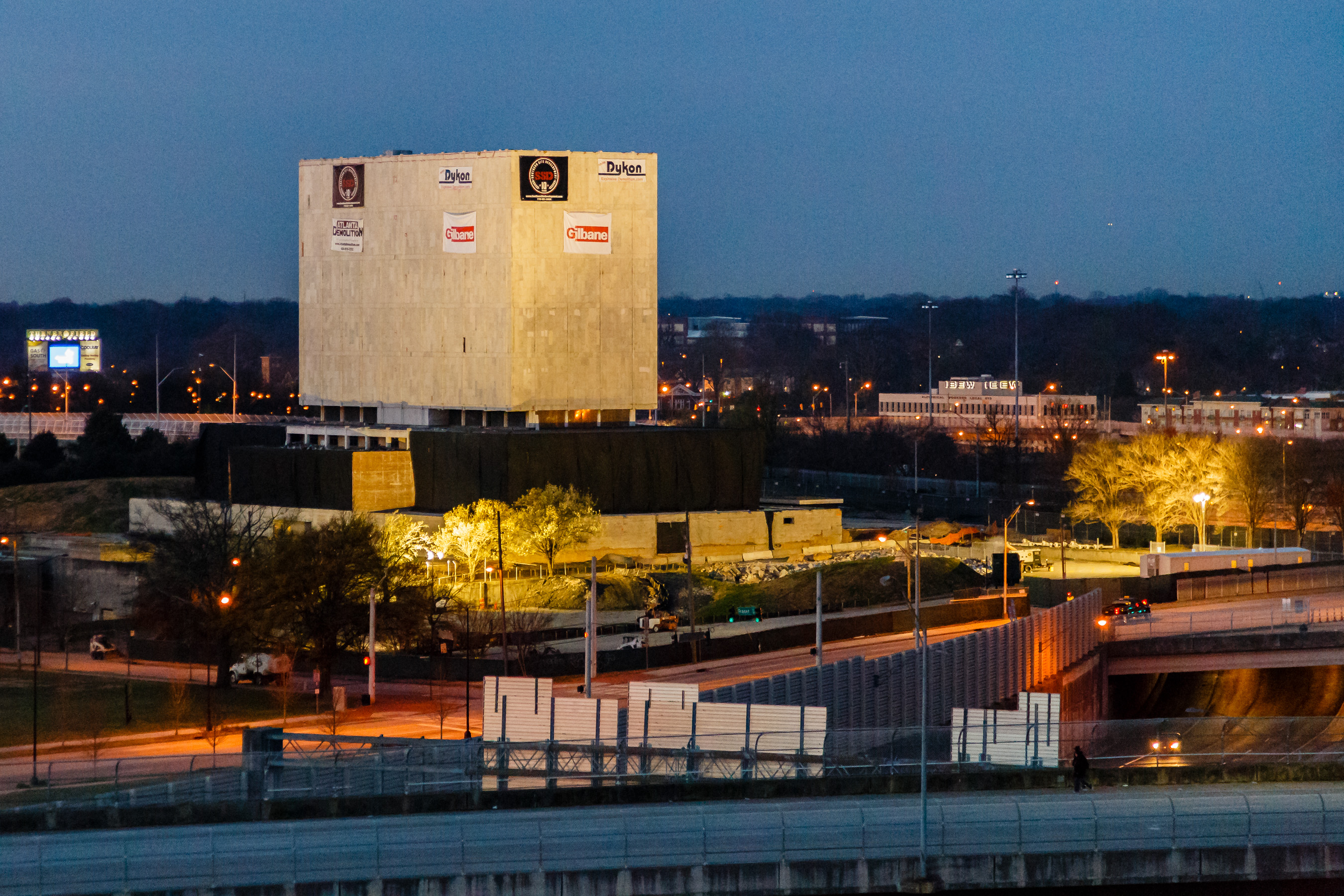
The Georgia Archives Building in 2017, prior to its demolition

Going into the 1960s, Bradbury would design two of his most notable works: a building for the Georgia Archives and a new Georgia Governor's Mansion. Bradbury began working on the former in 1962 as an extreme example of modernist architecture. The resulting building, completed in 1965, has been described by the New Georgia Encyclopedia as a "monumental box-on-pedestal". A 2011 article in Curbed Atlanta called the "monolithic building" a "modernist masterpiece", while architecture critic Robert M. Craig criticized the building and its overall box-shape as "an elemental form, but a boring one as well". On the other hand, the Georgia Governor's Mansion in Buckhead was designed in the Greek Revival style, modeled after the plantation house Tara from the film Gone with the Wind. The difference in architectural style from Bradbury's normal modernist style made him an odd choice for architect, and according to Curbed Atlanta, the archives building and mansion "present a fascinating dichotomy in architectural styles coming from one man". Work on the mansion lasted from 1964 to 1967.

=== Later life ===
In 1978, after 35 years of working through his own firm, Bradbury sold the firm and retired. He died in Atlanta on November 14, 1992.

== Works ==
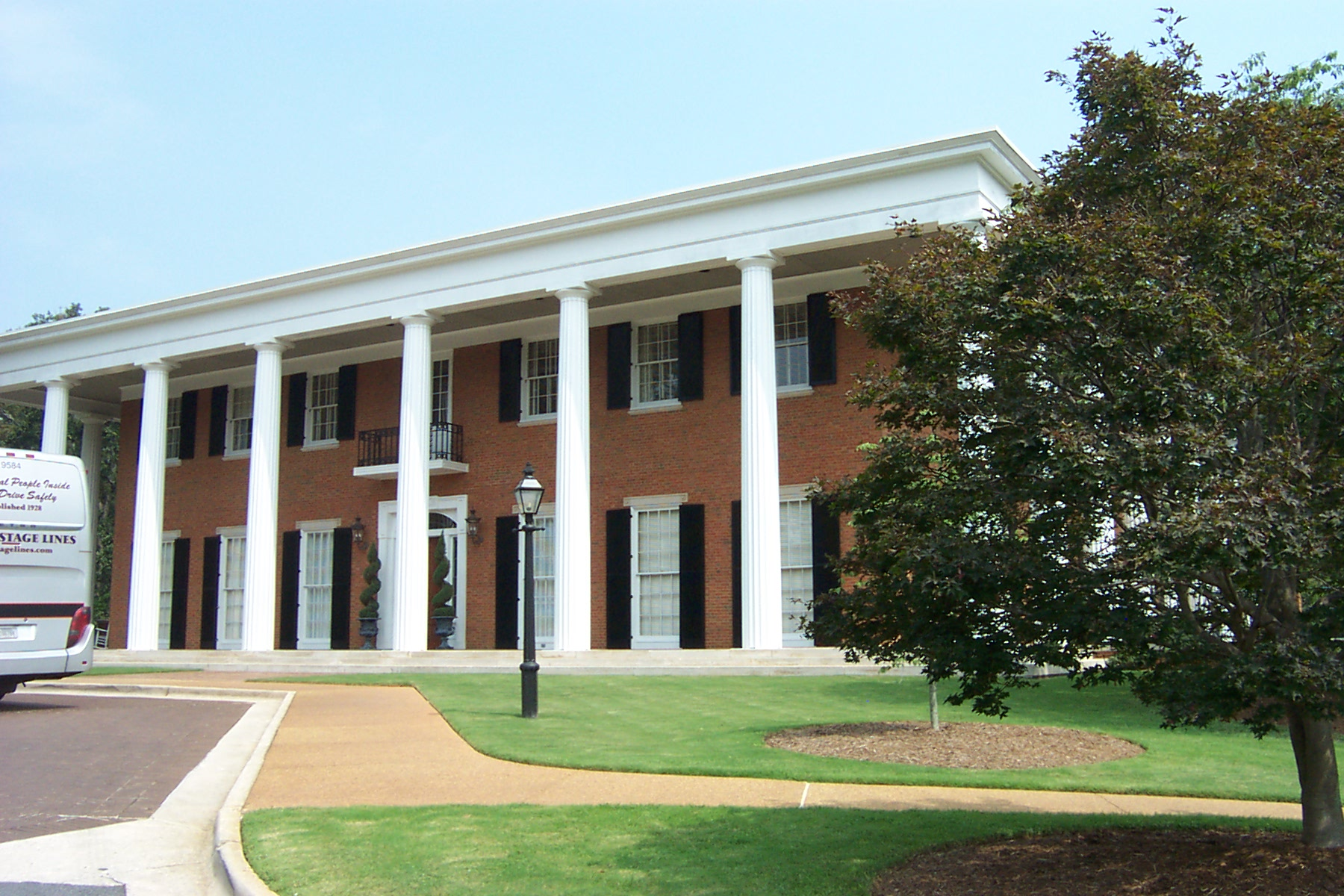
The Georgia Governor's Mansion in 2007

- State Office Building (later known as the Legislative Office Building), near the Georgia State Capitol (1938–1939).
- Seventh Street Candler Professional (Dental) Building, Atlanta (1946).
- De Ovies Parish Hall, Episcopal Cathedral of Saint Philip (1948–1949).
- Rock Spring Presbyterian Church, Atlanta (1950s).
- Venetian Hills Elementary School, Atlanta (1950s).
- Additions to West Hunter Street Baptist Church, Atlanta (1950s).
- Agriculture Building, near the Georgia State Capitol (1954).
- Law and Justice Building, near the Georgia State Capitol (1954).
- Human Resources Building, near the Georgia State Capitol.
- Labor Building, near the Georgia State Capitol.
- Transportation Building, near the Georgia State Capitol.
- Rich Electronic Computer Building, main campus of the Georgia Institute of Technology (1954–1955).
- Renovations to the Georgia State Capitol (1957–1958).
- Skiles Classroom Building, main campus of the Georgia Institute of Technology (1959).
- Georgia Mental Health Institute, main campus of Emory University (1962–1963).
- Georgia Archives Building, near the Georgia State Capitol (1962–1965).
- Yaarab Shrine Temple, Atlanta (1963–1965).
- Georgia Governor's Mansion, Buckhead (1964–1967).
- Law library extension to Hirsch Hall, University of Georgia School of Law (1964–1967).
- Trade and Industry Building, near the Georgia State Capitol (1960s).

== Sources ==
- Craig, Robert M. (1995). Atlanta Architecture: Art Deco to Modern Classic, 1929–1959. Foreword by Richard Guy Wilson. Gretna, Louisiana: Pelican Publishing Company. ISBN 978-1-4556-0044-1.
- Craig, Robert M. (2011). "Modern classic". In Marter, Joan (ed.). The Grove Encyclopedia of American Art. Vol. 1: Aalto–Cutrone. Oxford: Oxford University Press. pp. 330–332. ISBN 978-0-19-533579-8.
- Deal, Sandra D.; Dickey, Jennifer W.; Lewis, Catherine M. (2015). Memories of the Mansion: The Story of Georgia's Governor's Mansion. Published in cooperation with the University of Georgia Libraries and Kennesaw State University. Athens, Georgia: University of Georgia Press. ISBN 978-0-8203-4859-9.
