= Louise Frederick Hays =

- Born: Louese Caroline Frederick; April 18, 1881; Marshallville, Georgia; United States
- Died: October 14, 1951 (aged 70); Montezuma, Georgia, US
- Education: Wesleyan College (1900, A.B.; valedictorian); University of Georgia (1924, Litt.D.; honorary)
- Spouse: James Elijah Hays (1902–1929)

Director of the Georgia Department of Archives and History
- In office January 1, 1937 – October 14, 1951
- Preceded by: Ruth Blair
- Succeeded by: Mary Givens Bryan

Louise Frederick Hays (or Louese Frederick Hays; (Note: Hays wrote her own name as "Louese" in a 1900 yearbook; it is spelled "Louise" elsewhere, even in the same publication.) April 18, 1881 – October 14, 1951) was an American activist and archivist.

== Biography ==
Louese Caroline Frederick was born in Marshallville, Macon County, Georgia on April 18, 1881. In 1897, Hays enrolled at Wesleyan College as a sophomore, where she was president of Wesleyan's Philomathean Society; she was also editor-in-chief of the group's yearbook, Philomathean (1900). She graduated as valedictorian of her class in 1900. She chaired the first Phi Mu annual convention in Norfolk, Virginia in 1907. As an alumnus, she was secretary of her class through 1950, when she organized its golden reunion.

She married James Elijah Hays in 1902. They had two children. The family operated a peach farm. James Hays died on February 23, 1929.

Hays was a member of many organizations, including the American Red Cross, the Colonial Dames of America, the General Federation of Women's Clubs, the Macon County Democratic Women's Club, and the United Daughters of the Confederacy, for which she was state registrar from 1916 to 1919. She was the first woman trustee of the University of Georgia and a trustee at Tallulah Falls School.

Hays received an honorary Doctor of Letters from the University of Georgia in 1924. From 1925 to 1935, she was the postmaster of Montezuma. She was appointed in 1930 to write a history of Macon, which sparked an interest in history. Georgia secretary of state John B. Wilson named her as director of the Georgia Division of Archives and History in 1937, following Ruth Blair, and she held the role until her death, when Mary Givens Bryan took over as director.

During the 1930s, Hays lived in the National Register of Historic Places-listed Jones-Peterson House, now known as the Alma Fruit Farm.

In 1946, she published Hero of Hornet's Nest, a biography of Elijah Clarke. She was honored by the Atlanta branch of the National League of American Pen Women. In 1950, she edited and wrote and introduction for Eliza A. Bowen's The Story of Wilkes County, Georgia.

Hays died on October 14, 1951 in Montezuma at the age of 70.

In 2004, Hays was inducted into the Georgia Women of Achievement.

== Selected works ==
- Hays, Louise Frederick (1933). History of Macon County. Atlanta: Stein Printing Co.
- Hays, Louise Frederick (May 1942). "Benjamin Franklin Keene: Founder of the California Medical Association". California and Western Medicine. 56 (5): 297–300. PMC 1634399. PMID 18746201.
- Hays, Louise Frederick (1946). Hero of Hornet's Nest: A Biography of Elijah Clark. New York: The Hobson Book Press.
