= Rhodes–Haverty Building =

- U.S. National Register of Historic Places
- Atlanta Landmark Building
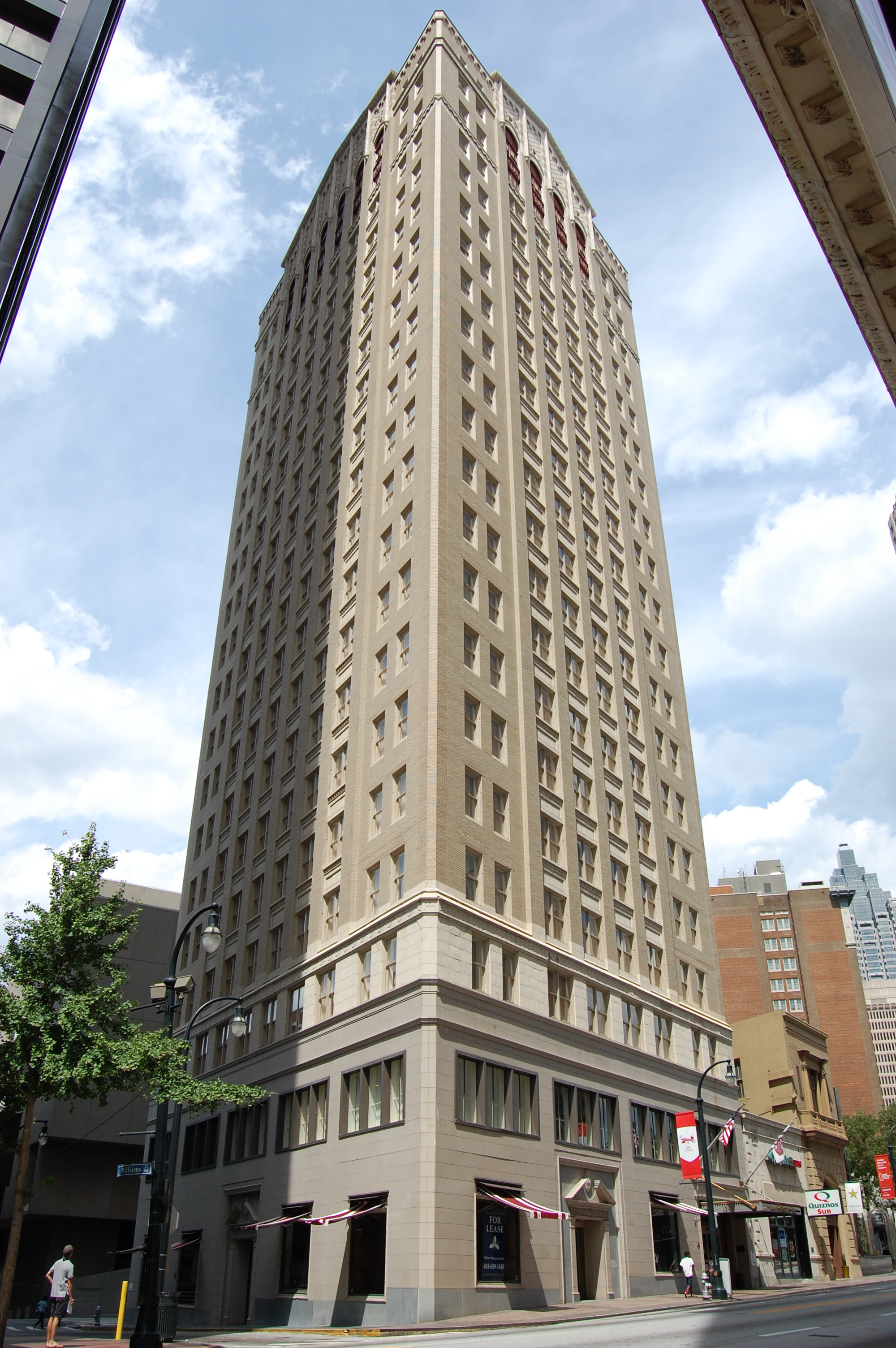
- Rhodes–Haverty Building in 2012

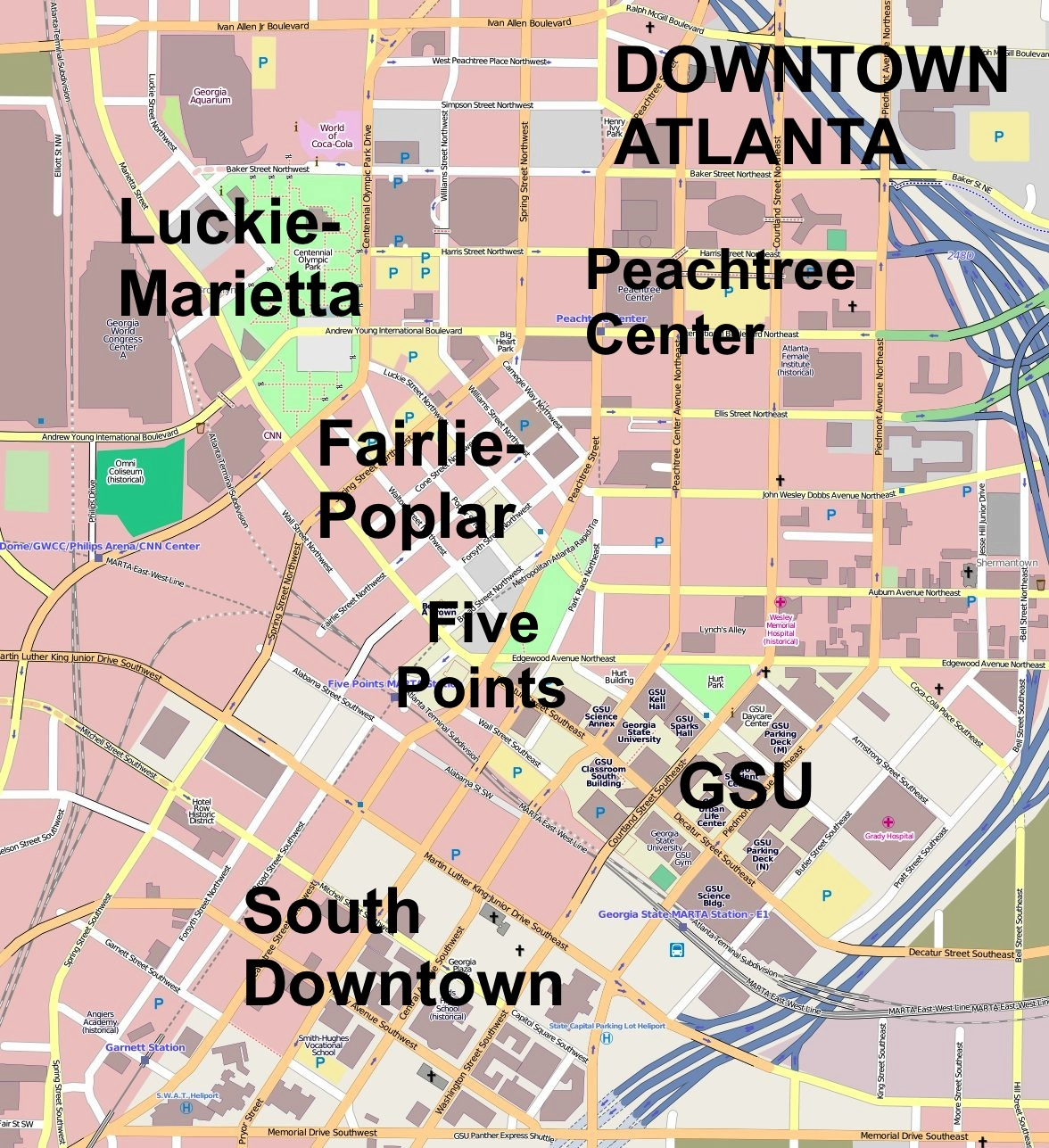
- Location within Downtown Atlanta Location within Atlanta Location within Georgia Location within the United States
- Location: 134 Peachtree Street NW; Atlanta, Georgia
- Built: 1929
- Architect: Pringle & Smith; Southern Ferro Concrete Co.
- Architectural style: Romanesque, Skyscraper
- NRHP reference No.: 79000725

Significant dates
- Added to NRHP: January 19, 1979
- Designated ALB: October 23, 1989

The historic 21-story Rhodes–Haverty Building was, at the time of its construction in 1929, the tallest building in Atlanta, Georgia. Designed by Atlanta architects Pringle and Smith, the building was built by furniture magnates A. G. Rhodes of Rhodes Furniture and J. J. Haverty of Havertys. It remained the tallest building in Atlanta until 1954.

The National Register of Historic Places listed the building in 1979. The building was converted from office use in 1995-1996 to become a Marriott Residence Inn, the Residence Inn Atlanta Downtown.

== Origin of name ==
The building was constructed for the Rhodes Haverty Investment Company, a partnership of furniture magnates Amos G. Rhodes of Rhodes Furniture and J. J. Haverty of Haverty's. It was not named for the Rhodes–Haverty Furniture Company (1889-1908), which had already been dissolved.

Immediately across Peachtree Street is the English-American Building, commonly referred to as the Candler Building.

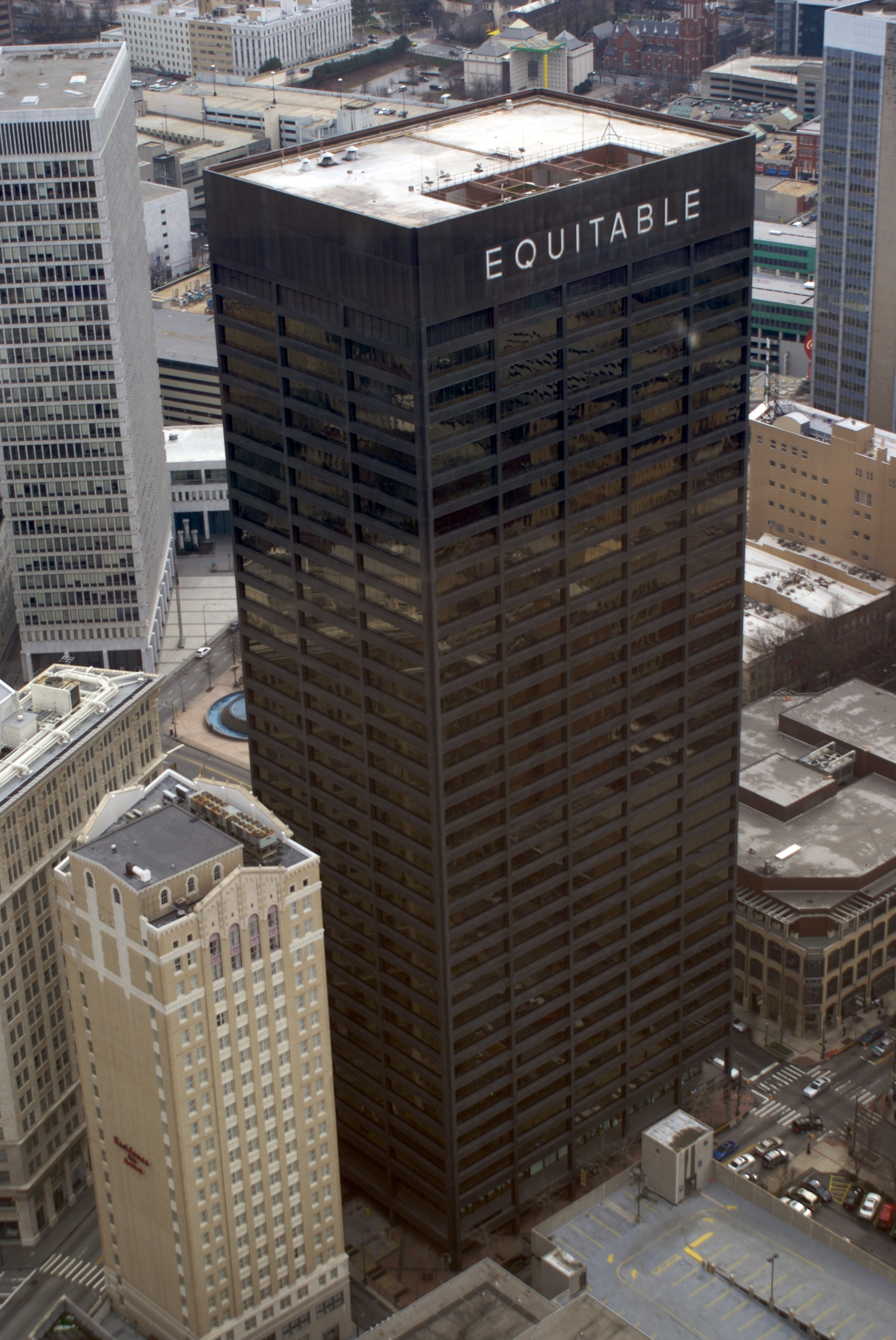
Rhodes–Haverty Building at lower left (dwarfed by the Equitable Building), looking from north to south.

== See also ==
- Rhodes Memorial Hall
- National Register of Historic Places listings in Fulton County, Georgia
- Hotels in Atlanta
