= Robert M. Craig =

- Education: University of Illinois (M.A.); Cornell University (Ph.D.)
- Occupations: Architectural historian Professor
- Employer: Georgia Institute of Technology
- Known for: Research on Francis Palmer Smith, Bernard Maybeck, and Atlanta architecture
- Children: 1

Robert Michael Craig is an American architectural historian and Professor Emeritus at the Georgia Institute of Technology. He is known for his scholarship on 19th and early 20th-century architecture, including the Arts and Crafts movement, Art Deco, and the work of architects Francis Palmer Smith and Bernard Maybeck.

== Education and military service ==
Craig holds a Master's degree in History from the University of Illinois. In 1973, he became the first recipient of a Ph.D. in the History of Architecture and Urban Development from Cornell University. His doctoral dissertation focused on the work of Bernard Maybeck at Principia College, a topic he continued to research for over thirty years.

Craig served in the United States Navy during the Vietnam War aboard the aircraft carrier USS Intrepid in the late 1960s and was honorably discharged in 1970.

== Academic career ==
Craig taught the history of architecture at the Georgia Institute of Technology College of Design from 1973 until his retirement in 2011, after which he was named Professor Emeritus. His courses covered American, modern, and medieval architecture, as well as seminars on Frank Lloyd Wright, Atlanta architecture, and the Arts and Crafts movement. He has presented over 160 papers at academic conferences and lectured in the United States, China, Australia, and France.

Craig served as the architecture editor for the Grove Encyclopedia of American Art (2011). He was the editor of the SECAC Review (now Art Inquiries) during the 1980s and helped found the journal XVIII: New Perspectives on the Eighteenth Century. He has held leadership roles in several academic societies, including serving as secretary of the Society of Architectural Historians (SAH) for ten years and as president of the Nineteenth-Century Studies Association (NCSA) and the Southeastern American Society for Eighteenth-Century Studies (SEASECS). He is a founding member of the Southeast Chapter of the Society of Architectural Historians (SESAH), where he served as treasurer for twenty-four years and as an early president.

== Scholarship ==
Craig is the author of twelve books. His work relies heavily on primary sources, including construction photographs, drawings, and correspondence. He is also a photographer and has provided images for his own books and other scholarly publications. Craig's 1995 book, Atlanta Architecture: Art Deco to Modern Classic, 1929–1959, provides a chronological account of the city's commercial and institutional architecture during the mid-twentieth century. The book categorizes buildings into styles such as Art Deco and Modern Classic, illustrated largely with the author's own photography.

In 2004, Craig published Bernard Maybeck at Principia College: The Art and Craft of Building, which documents the architect's commission for the college in Illinois. The book details the relationship between Maybeck and the client, Frederic Morgan, and challenges earlier scholarly assertions that the project was merely a late "exercise in academic eclecticism."

Craigs 2012 biography work, The Architecture of Francis Palmer Smith: Atlanta's Scholar Architect, chronicles the career of the Beaux-Arts architect who directed Georgia Tech's architecture department from 1909 to 1922. The book covers Smith's partnership with Robert Smith Pringle and their work on notable Atlanta landmarks such as the Rhodes-Haverty Building and the Cathedral of St. Philip.

== Personal life ==
Craig has lived in Atlanta, Georgia, since 1973. He maintains a summer cottage in Ocean City, Maryland. He is married and has one son and two granddaughters. His hobbies include watercolor painting, folk singing, swimming, and travel. He has also been involved in historic preservation, restoring two houses listed on the National Register of Historic Places.

== Selected bibliography ==
- Atlanta Architecture: Art Deco to Modern Classic, 1929–1959 (1995)
- John Portman: Art and Architecture (co-author with Paul Goldberger)
- Bernard Maybeck at Principia College: The Art and Craft of Building (2004)
- The Architecture of Francis Palmer Smith: Atlanta's Scholar Architect (2012)

== Sources ==
- "Robert M. Craig". Hellgate Press.
- Freeman, Greg (8 July 2012). "A Review of The Architecture of Francis Palmer Smith: Atlanta's Scholar Architect". SouthernEdition.com.
- Simpson, Pamela H. (2005). "Bernard Maybeck at Principia College: The Art and Craft of Building by Robert M. Craig (review)". Arris. 16. The University of North Carolina Press: 83–84. doi:10.1353/arr.2005.0007.
- Smart, Murray, Jr. (1995). "Atlanta Architecture—Art Deco to Modern Classic, 1929–1959 by Robert M. Craig (review)". Arris. 6. The University of North Carolina Press: 62–63. doi:10.1353/arr.1995.0004.
- "Robert M. Craig". WGBH.
