= Mary G. Bryan =

American archivist

Mary Givens Bryan
- Born: Mary Eugenia Givens; September 3, 1910; LaGrange, Georgia, U.S.
- Died: July 28, 1964 (aged 53); Atlanta, Georgia, U.S.
- Occupations: Archivist, lobbyist

Mary Eugenia Givens Bryan (September 3, 1910 – July 28, 1964) was an American archivist and the director of the Georgia Department of Archives and History from 1951 to 1964. She was president of the Society of American Archivists from 1959 to 1960.

== Early life and education ==
Bryan was born in La Grange, Georgia in 1910, the daughter of Young Clyde Givens and Janie Lou Cox Givens. She was raised in Decatur, outside of Atlanta. She attended Mount de Sales Academy, Emory University and the Women's College of Georgia. She earned diplomas in archival administration and records management from American University in the 1950s.

== Career ==
Bryan joined the staff of the Department of Archives and History in 1934, She worked her way from the position of clerk to director and state archivist over the course of a thirty-year career. During her tenure as director she worked towards preserving records on microfiche to save space, and advocated for the construction of a state archives building, She spoke to community groups throughout the state and on radio and television programs about the need for modern facilities to house the state's historical records. She sometimes brought along papers from the archives that had been damaged by water leaks and squirrels, to demonstrate the current unsuitable conditions. The new state archives building was completed a year after her death in October 1965.

Bryan was an active member of the Society of American Archivists, serving as a member of Council from 1957 to 1958, and as president of the organization from 1959 to 1960. She was a witness in the trial of Robert Bradford Murphy, who was convicted of possessing documents stolen from the National Archives in 1964.

== Publications ==
- A report on archival, historical and museum activities in Georgia on the State and local level (1955)
- "Trends of Organization in State Archives" (1958)
- Passports issued by governors of Georgia, 1785 to 1809 (1959)

== Personal life and legacy ==
Givens married history professor T. Conn Bryan in 1948; they divorced in 1951. She died from acute nephritis in 1964, at the age of 53, in Atlanta. In 2021 Bryan was inducted into the Georgia Women of Achievement Hall of Fame. Besides a collection at the Georgia Archives, there is a collection of her papers in the Bryan-Lang Archives in Camden County. There is also a folder of correspondence from Bryan in the Special Collections Library at the University of Georgia.
