= Rhodes Hall =

Historic house in Atlanta, Georgia, United States

- Rhodes Memorial Hall
- U.S. National Register of Historic Places
- Atlanta Landmark Building
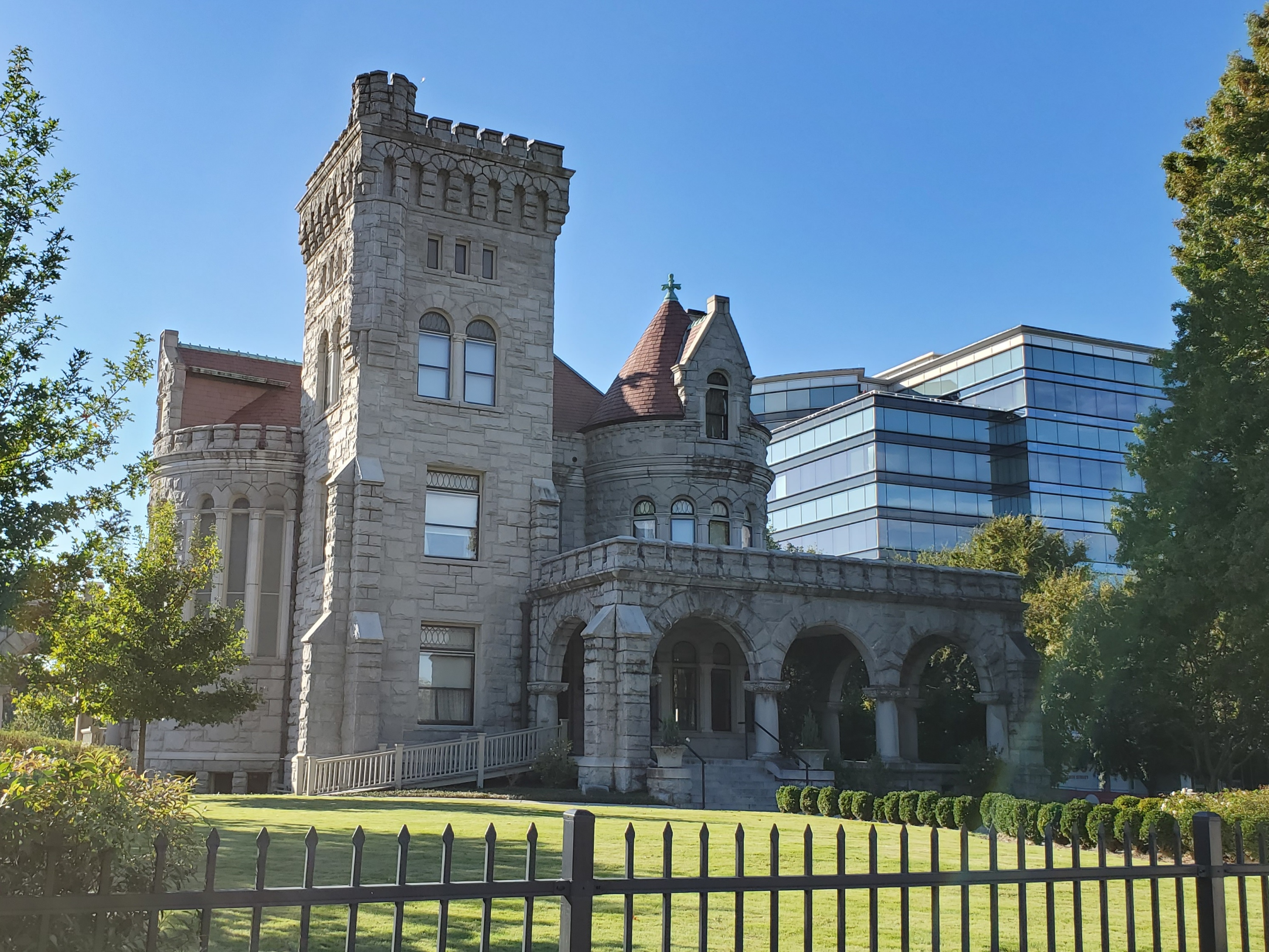
- Rhodes Hall (2020)

- Location within Atlanta Location within Georgia Location within the United States
- Location: 1516 Peachtree St., NW Atlanta
- Coordinates: 33°47′45.5″N 84°23′18″W
- Built: 1904
- Architect: Willis F. Denny
- Architectural style: Romanesque
- NRHP reference No.: 74000678

Significant dates
- Added to NRHP: March 1, 1974
- Designated ALB: October 23, 1989

Rhodes Memorial Hall, commonly known as Rhodes Hall, is a historic house located in Atlanta, Georgia, United States. It was built as the home of furniture magnate Amos Giles Rhodes, proprietor of Atlanta-based Rhodes Furniture. The Romanesque Revival house occupies a prominent location on Peachtree Street, the main street of Atlanta, and is listed in the National Register of Historic Places. It is open to the public and has been the home of The Georgia Trust for Historic Preservation since 1983.

== Inspiration ==
Rhodes Hall is a Romanesque Revival 9,000-square-foot (840 m^{2}) house inspired by the Rhineland castles that Rhodes admired on a trip to Europe in the late 1890s. Architect Willis F. Denny designed the unique home with Stone Mountain granite, incorporating medieval Romanesque, Victorian, and Arts and Crafts designs as well as necessary adaptations for an early 20th-century home. After two years of construction, the house was completed in 1904.

== Victorian architecture ==
Known as Le Rêve ("The Dream"), Rhodes Hall is one of the finest intact expressions of medievalism and late Victorian architectural design in Atlanta. The grandest feature of the interior is a magnificent series of stained and painted glass windows that rise above a carved mahogany staircase. The three-panel series depicts the rise and fall of the Confederacy from Fort Sumter to Appomattox, and includes medallion portraits of over a dozen Confederates. These Confederate officers include ardent opponents of reconstruction (Robert Toombs, 1810–1885), a Grand Wizard of the Ku Klux Klan (Nathan Bedford Forrest, 1821–1877), and the head of the Ku Klux Klan in the State of Georgia (John B. Gordon, 1832–1904).

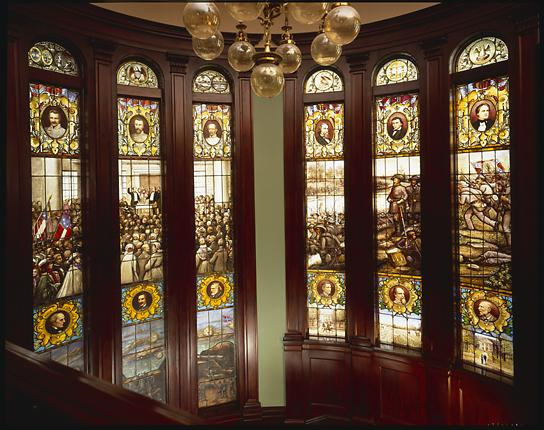
The famed Rhodes Hall windows depict the birth of the Confederacy

== Characteristics ==
The house cost Rhodes $50,000 to build in 1904. Wired for electricity when it was built, Rhodes Hall is a prime example of the fascination that new technology held for Atlantans at the turn of the century. Over 300 light bulbs light the entire house. The house also had electric call buttons in most rooms as well as a security system. Among the materials used to build the home, the mahogany was from the West Indies and the exterior granite was brought over in 500-pound (227 kg) blocks in wagons from Stone Mountain, located about 25 miles (40 km) east of Atlanta.

Although Rhodes Hall is now surrounded by commercial buildings and heavy traffic, it has survived damage due to careful historic preservation and restoration efforts. After the death of Rhodes and his wife, their children deeded the house to the state of Georgia, with a restriction that it be used for "historic purposes". State historian Ruth Blair moved the Georgia Department of Archives and History to the house, and lived in the house as well. It was used to house the Georgia State Archives from 1930 to 1965. After the Archives moved to a more modern building, Rhodes Hall continued to provide archive services as a branch.

In 1983 Rhodes Hall was transferred to the Georgia Trust for Historic Preservation, which undertook a long-term restoration program. The main stairs and windows, which had been moved to the new Archives, were brought back and re-installed in 1990.

== House museum ==
Rhodes Hall is used as both an event space and as the offices of the Georgia Trust for Historic Preservation. There are house tours on Saturdays (from 10 - 2, the last tour starts at 1) and group tours can be given on other days with advance arrangement. Rhodes Hall is also available for rentals including weddings, receptions, corporate events, cocktail gatherings, and birthday parties.

== Rhodes Center ==
In 1937, the Rhodes Center, Atlanta's first shopping center, was built on the north, west and south sides of Rhodes Hall (photo, p.5). Only the south building remains.

== See also ==
- Rhodes–Haverty Building
