= Rhodes Furniture =

Defunct American retail furniture company

- Type: Private company
- Industry: Furnishings
- Founded: 1879; 147 years ago
- Defunct: December 28, 2005; 20 years ago
- Fate: Bankruptcy and liquidation; some stores converted to Rooms To Go
- Headquarters: Atlanta, Georgia, U.S.
- Products: Home Furniture

The Rhodes Furniture Company was an American retail furniture company based in Atlanta, Georgia. Beginning with a single store in Downtown Atlanta, the company would expand throughout the United States.

== History ==
Amos G. Rhodes was born in 1850 in Henderson, Kentucky. In 1875, he came to Atlanta as a laborer for the L & N Railroad. In 1879, he began a small furniture company in Atlanta. Some sources credit him with inventing the installment plan for buying furniture.

In 1889, Rhodes entered a partnership with the owner of a neighboring furniture store J.J. Haverty (who would later found Havertys), forming the Rhodes-Haverty Furniture Company. A year and a half after the first Rhodes-Haverty store opened, J.J. Haverty and the company headquarters moved westward to St. Louis, Missouri to expand, and soon after bought interest in a number of smaller showrooms. It wasn't until 1894 that J.J. returned his family back to Atlanta and went on the road to open more stores.

On December 1, 1904, Rhodes-Haverty opened a new flagship store at the corner of Whitehall and Mitchell Streets in Atlanta on the site of Captain William H. Brotherton's dry goods store. It incorporated the Walter J. Wood furniture store next door. By 1908, 17 stores were open.

J.J. Haverty's son Clarence rose to a leadership position and wished for a larger role in the business. In November 1908, the partnership between Haverty and Rhodes was dissolved amicably and 16 of the stores were divided between Rhodes and Haverty. Rhodes retained control of 3 of the Atlanta stores.

The main Atlanta location was purchased outright by J.J. Haverty and the business took back its original name of Haverty Furniture Company. The location at 103-111 Whitehall Street (now Peachtree Street SW) went on to do business as the Rhodes-Wood Furniture Co. Amos Rhodes died in 1928, leaving a substantial endowment.

After the dissolution the Rhodes Haverty Investment Company remained, and was the namesake of the 1929 Rhodes-Haverty Building, not Rhodes-Haverty Furniture, which by then had been dissolved.

== Sell out ==
Rhodes Furniture had grown to 70 stores by 1990. When bought by Heilig-Meyers in 1996, Rhodes was the fourth-largest furniture retailer in the United States with $430 million in revenue. Heilig-Meyers made the Rhodes stores more upscale, but the plan backfired and customers deserted the stores. Heilig-Meyers sold Rhodes in 1999.

== Liquidation ==
Rhodes filed for bankruptcy in 2004, and all of their stores were liquidated by the end of the following year. Rooms To Go won the auction and paid $45.8 million to take over Rhodes' 50 stores and other assets. Most stores later opened as Broyhill Furniture.

== See also ==
- Wolf Furniture
