= Atlanta Zero Mile Post =

Historical railroad marker in Atlanta, United States

Coordinates: 33.752335°N 84.388584°W

- Western and Atlantic Railroad Zero Milepost
- Formerly listed on the U.S. National Register of Historic Places
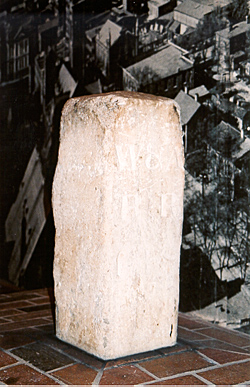
- Atlanta Zero Mile Post

- Location within Georgia
- Location: Central Ave. between Wall St. and Railroad Ave., Atlanta, Georgia
- Area: less than one acre
- Built: 1842
- NRHP reference No.: 77000435

Significant dates
- Added to NRHP: September 19, 1977
- Removed from NRHP: April 26, 2019

The Atlanta Zero Mile Post is a stone marker which marked the terminus of the Western and Atlantic Railroad in Atlanta, US. It was located in a disused building in Downtown Atlanta, within the Underground Atlanta Historic District, under the Central Ave. viaduct, between Alabama and Wall streets. The Zero Mile Post was recognized with a historical marker by the Georgia Historical Commission in 1958 and entered into the National Register of Historic Places in 1977. The Historic Preservation Division of the Georgia Department of Natural Resources requested its delisting in February 2019.

In the 1980s, the Zero Mile Post was moved indoors when a passenger depot was built around it for the New Georgia Railroad tourist operation. After the railroad ceased operations in 1994, the depot was secured behind a locked fence, with access only available by appointment through the Georgia Building Authority.

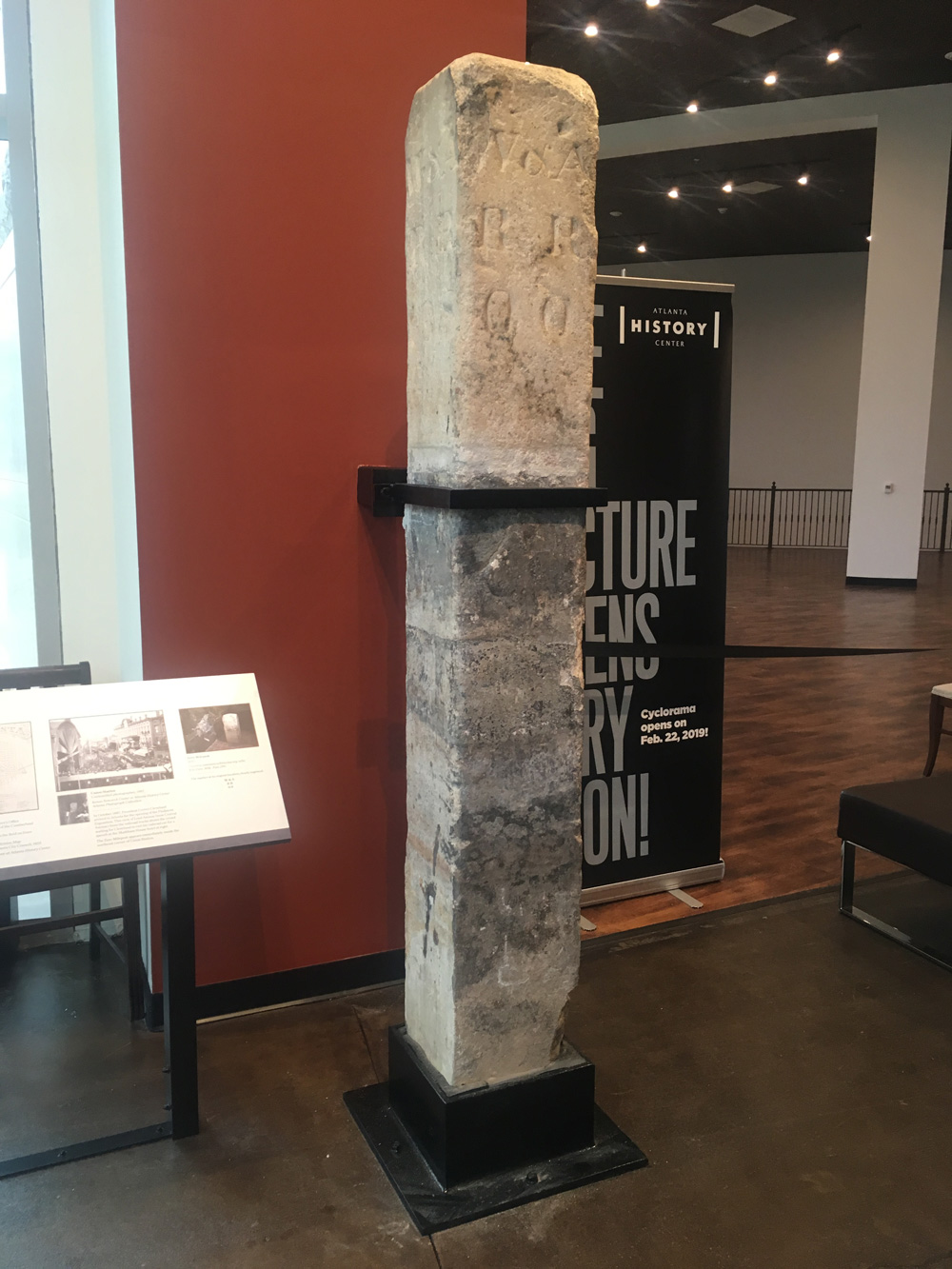
The Zero Mile Post on display in the Atlanta History Center (December 8, 2018)

In October 2018, the Zero Mile Post was moved from the Georgia Building Authority's depot building to the Atlanta History Center, and the building was demolished to accommodate the reconstruction of the Central Avenue and Courtland Street bridges above. A replica post was placed at the exact location of the original, and paired with an interpretive marker provided by The Georgia Historical Society after the bridge work concluded.

The Zero Mile Post's relocation generated controversy, with some arguing that it lost much of its significance by being removed from its original location, while those at the History Center say that it is well preserved, and that the replica is better suited for outdoor exhibition. The Zero Mile Post is currently displayed and interpreted in an exhibition, Locomotion: Railroads and the Making of Atlanta, with the recently restored Texas locomotive, one of the two remaining Western & Atlantic locomotives that would have passed by the mile post many times during its service.

Usually placed along rail lines at each mile, markers informed train crews where they were along a specific route. The above-ground portion of the rectangular marker is approximately 1 foot wide on each side and 42 inches tall. The crown is pyramidal, and one side of the marker is engraved with "W&A RR 0.0" – the W&A indicating the Western & Atlantic Railroad and the double-zero designating the beginning of the rail line. The other side of the marker is engraved “W&A RR 138”. When entirely exposed, the marker is 7 feet 5 inches tall and weighs approximately 800 pounds.
