= Smith Farm (Atlanta) =

Historic house in Georgia, United States

- Tullie Smith House
- U.S. National Register of Historic Places
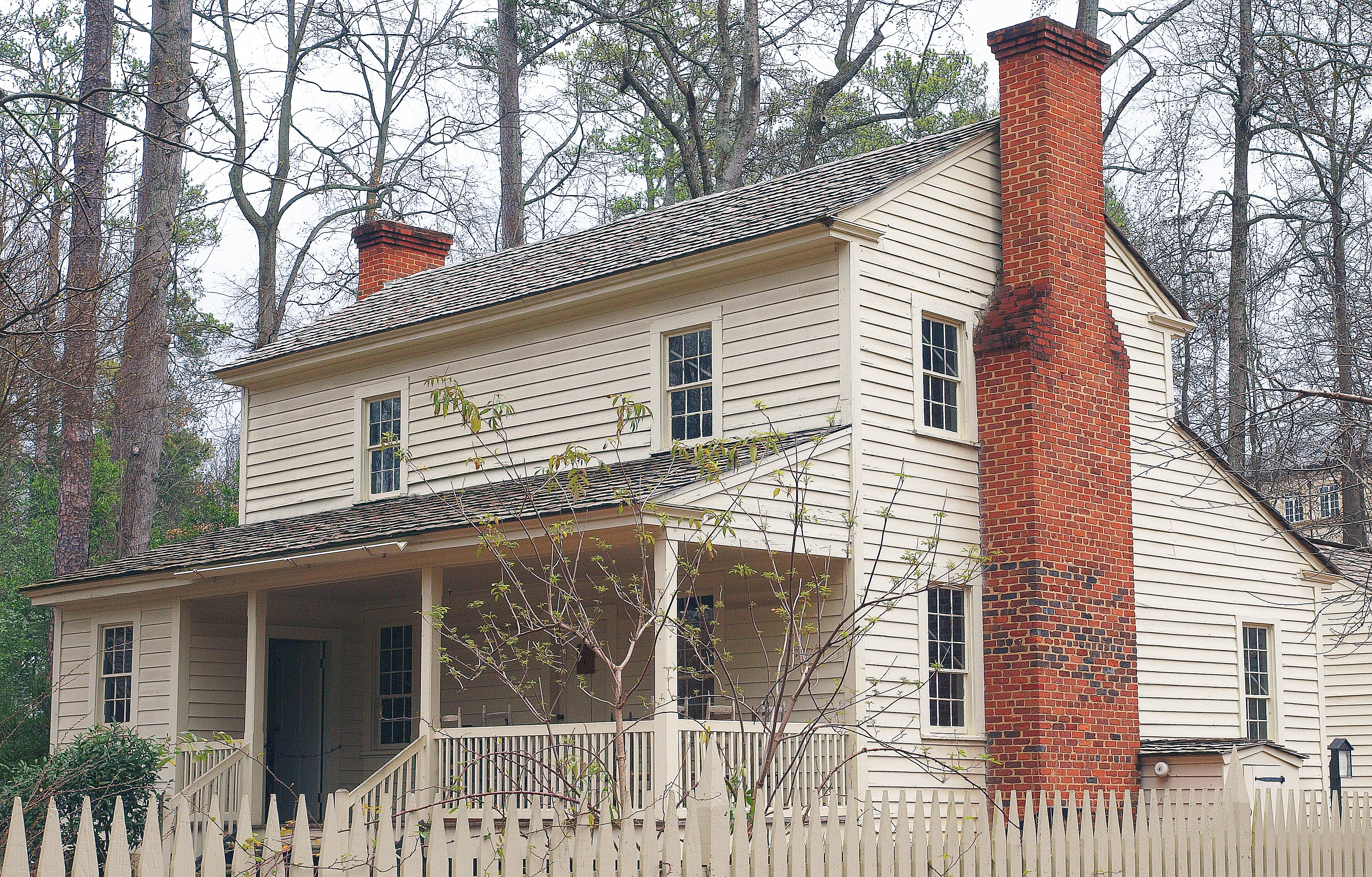

- Location within Atlanta Location within Georgia Location within the United States
- Location: 130 West Paces Ferry Road NW, Atlanta, Georgia
- Coordinates: 33°50′26″N 84°23′8″W
- Built: 1835
- Architect: Robert H. Smith
- NRHP reference No.: 70000204
- Added to NRHP: November 20, 1970

Smith Farm is a small plantation or farm house, built c. 1840 by Robert and Elizabeth Smith. It is Atlanta's oldest surviving farm house. It is one of the oldest structures in Atlanta. It is a typical kind of plantation house owned by small farmers. The house was located in Dekalb County, Georgia on 800 acres (3.2 km^{2}). The last Smith to occupy the property was Tullie, the great-great-granddaughter of Robert. By the 1960s the house was surrounded by highways and development, and was donated to the Atlanta Historical Society (now Atlanta History Center). The house was moved in 1969 to its present site on the grounds of the Atlanta History Center.

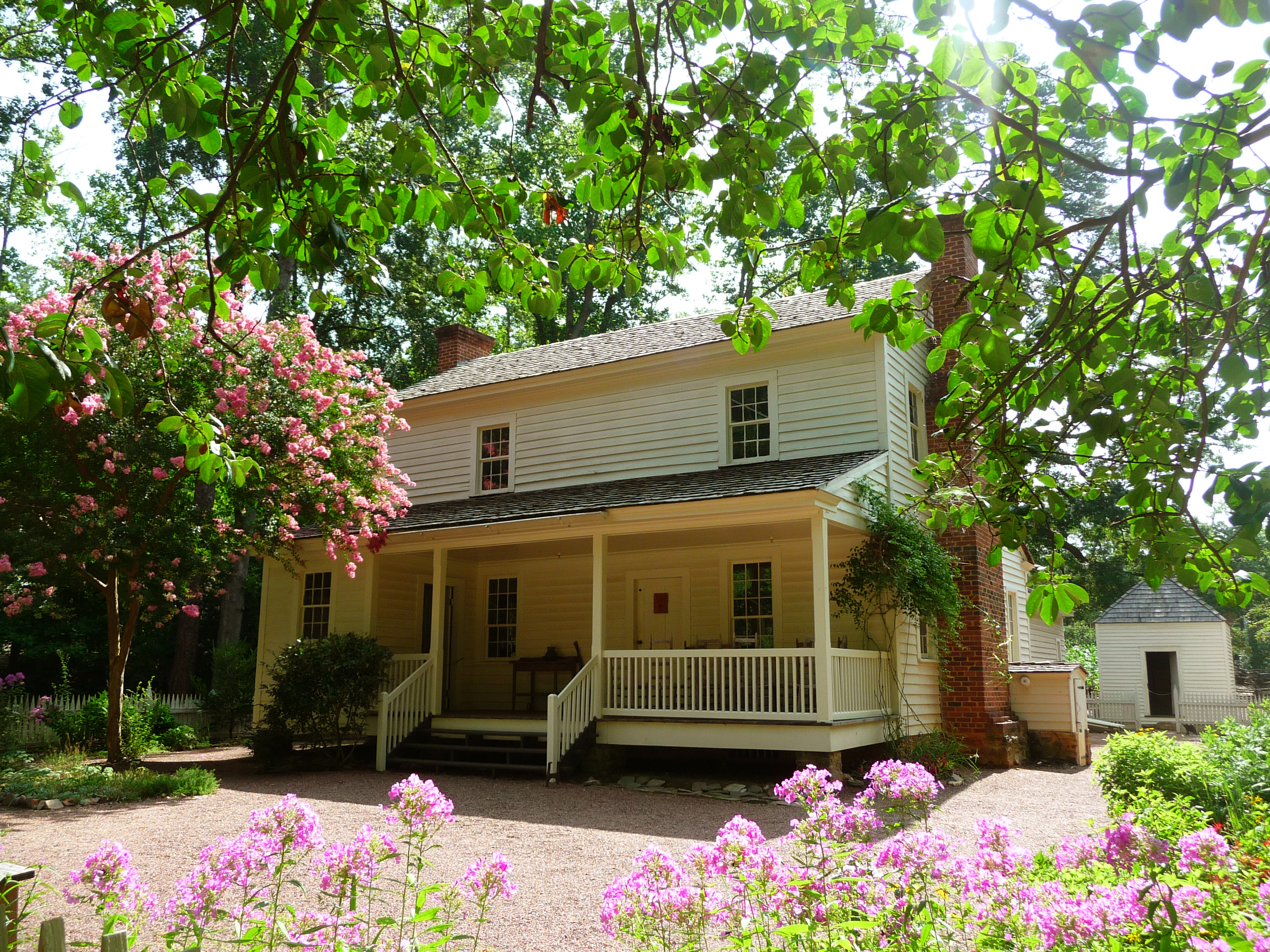
Tullie Smith House in 2009

The farm was restored in January 1970. Chaired by Bettijo Hogan Cook (now Trawick), the original Tullie Smith Restoration Committee included Mrs. Ivan Allen Jr., Mr. Edward Daugherty, Mr. Dan Franklin, Mrs. Mary Gregory Jewett, Miss Isabelle Johnston, Mrs. Mills B. Lane, Mr. James Means, Mrs. Thomas E. Martin Jr., Mr. William R. Mitchell Jr., and Mrs. John C. Symmes. It is now operated by Atlanta History Center as a 19th-century historic house museum known as Smith Farm. Other buildings found on the farm property, including the enslaved people's cabin, dairy, blacksmith shop, smokehouse, corncrib, chicken coop, barn, and outhouse were brought from different parts of Georgia to represent aspects of the original farm.

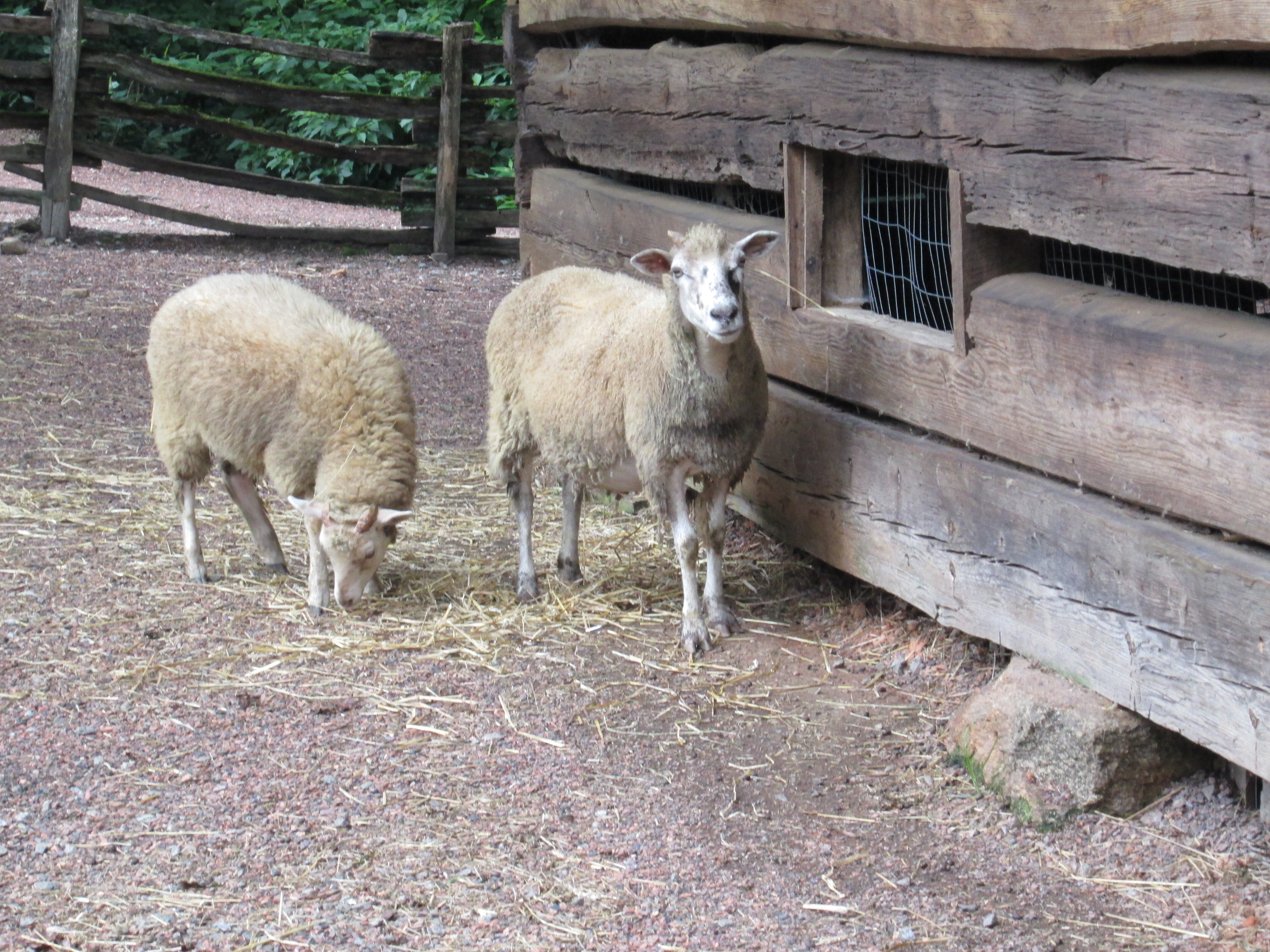
Sheep at Smith Farm in 2013

"The landscape represents the Smith Farm in its early era, with historic varieties of crops in the fields, the enslaved people's garden, the kitchen garden, and a swept yard by the house planted with heirloom flowers such as love-lies-bleeding (Amaranthus sp.) and rose campion (Lychnis coronaria). Surrounding the farm's outbuildings are naturalistic, native plantings. Heritage-breed sheep, goats, chickens, and turkeys are representative of the types of livestock found on this type of farm." Living history presentations are given during special events.
