= Georgia Archives =

Official repository for the U.S. state of Georgia

Coordinates: 33.596755°N 84.336939°W

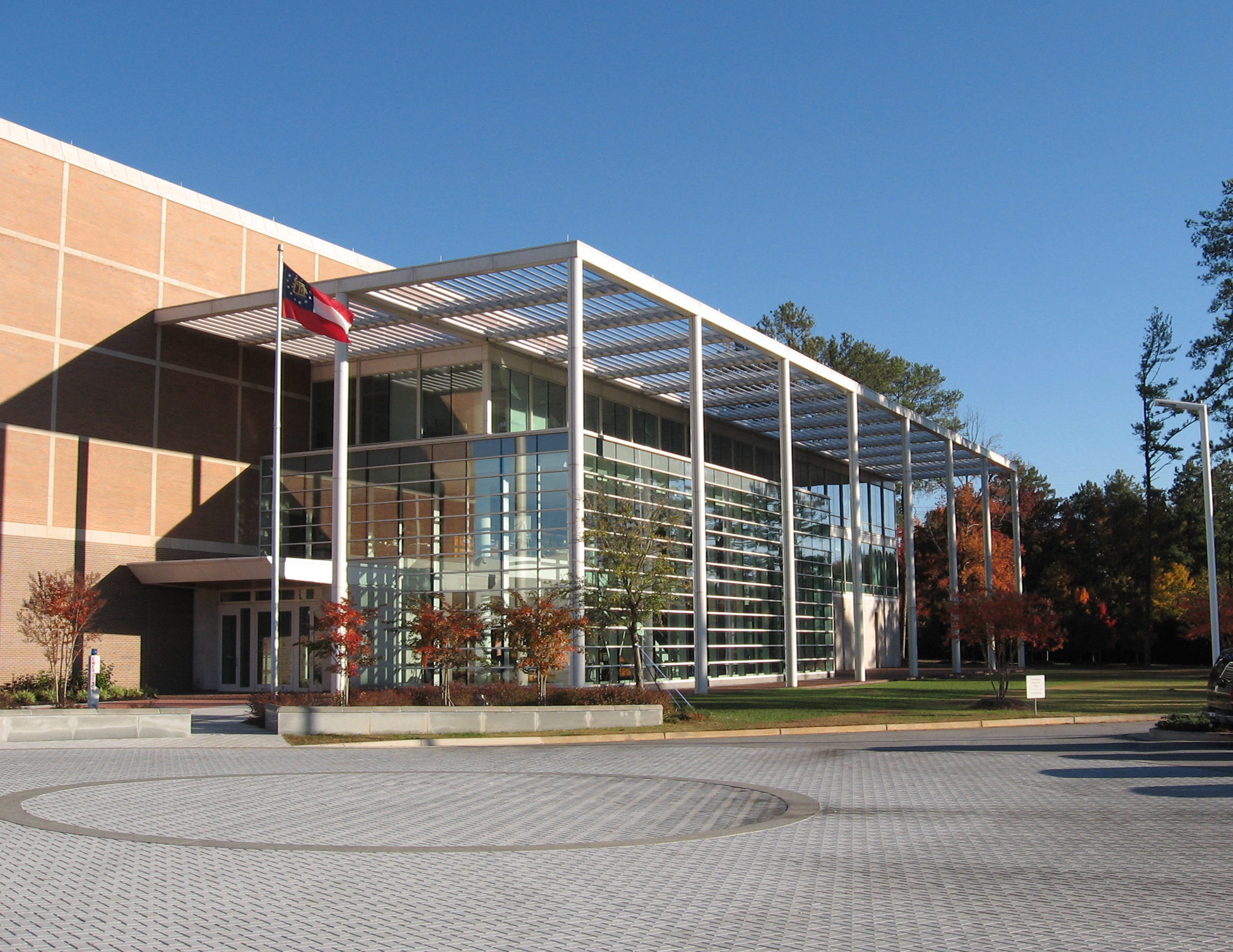
The Georgia Archives in Morrow

The Georgia Archives is the official repository of archival records for the U.S. state of Georgia, located in Morrow. The Georgia Archives was previously part of the Georgia Division of Archives and History, part of the office of the Georgia Secretary of State. In 2013 it became part of the University System of Georgia and is currently overseen by the associate vice chancellor for archives. The primary purpose of the Georgia Archives is to identify which state agency records are worth preserving for hundreds of years, transfer those records to the archives, protect them, and make them available to people who need them. In addition, the archives help state agencies and local governments manage active records and store the inactive records of state government in the State Records Center.

== History and facilities ==
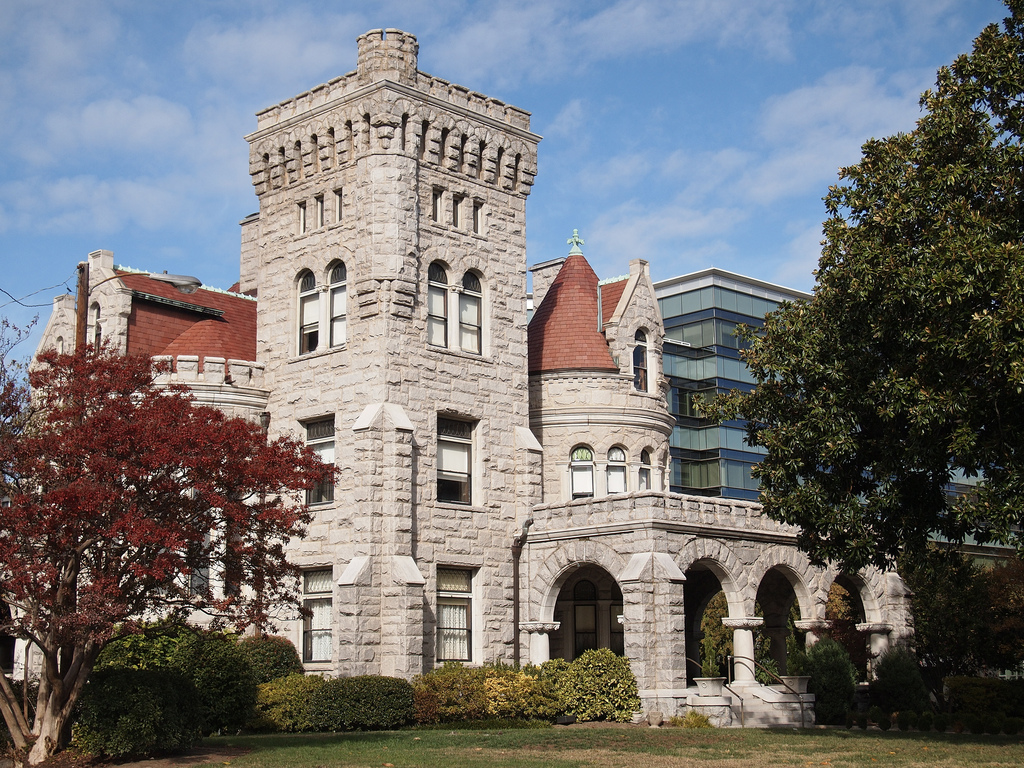
Rhodes Hall

The Georgia Archives was established on August 20, 1918, after a prolonged effort on the part of the Archives' first director, Lucian Lamar Knight. The Archives occupied a balcony in the State Capitol Building for twelve years until 1930, when furniture magnate Amos G. Rhodes left his home, "Rhodes Hall", to the state. Knight's successor Ruth Blair facilitated the move of the archives to the mansion on Peachtree Street. Blair was followed as director by Louise Frederick Hays, who served from January 1, 1937, until her death on October 14, 1951. After Hays, Mary Givens Bryan was director.

On October 11, 1965, the Archives dedicated its first home built specifically to house archival collections. The 14-story marble-clad building was hailed as the most modern archival facility in the country. The new home led to the expansion of services, including the addition of records management and microfilming services for state agencies and local governments.

In 1998, engineers determined that the downtown building was sinking due to groundwater and nearby interstate construction. Even as the building sank, the archives faced massive expenses to repair the aging HVAC systems. The cost to repair and refurbish the state archives (estimated by some to be as much as $40,000,000) made new construction an attractive alternative.

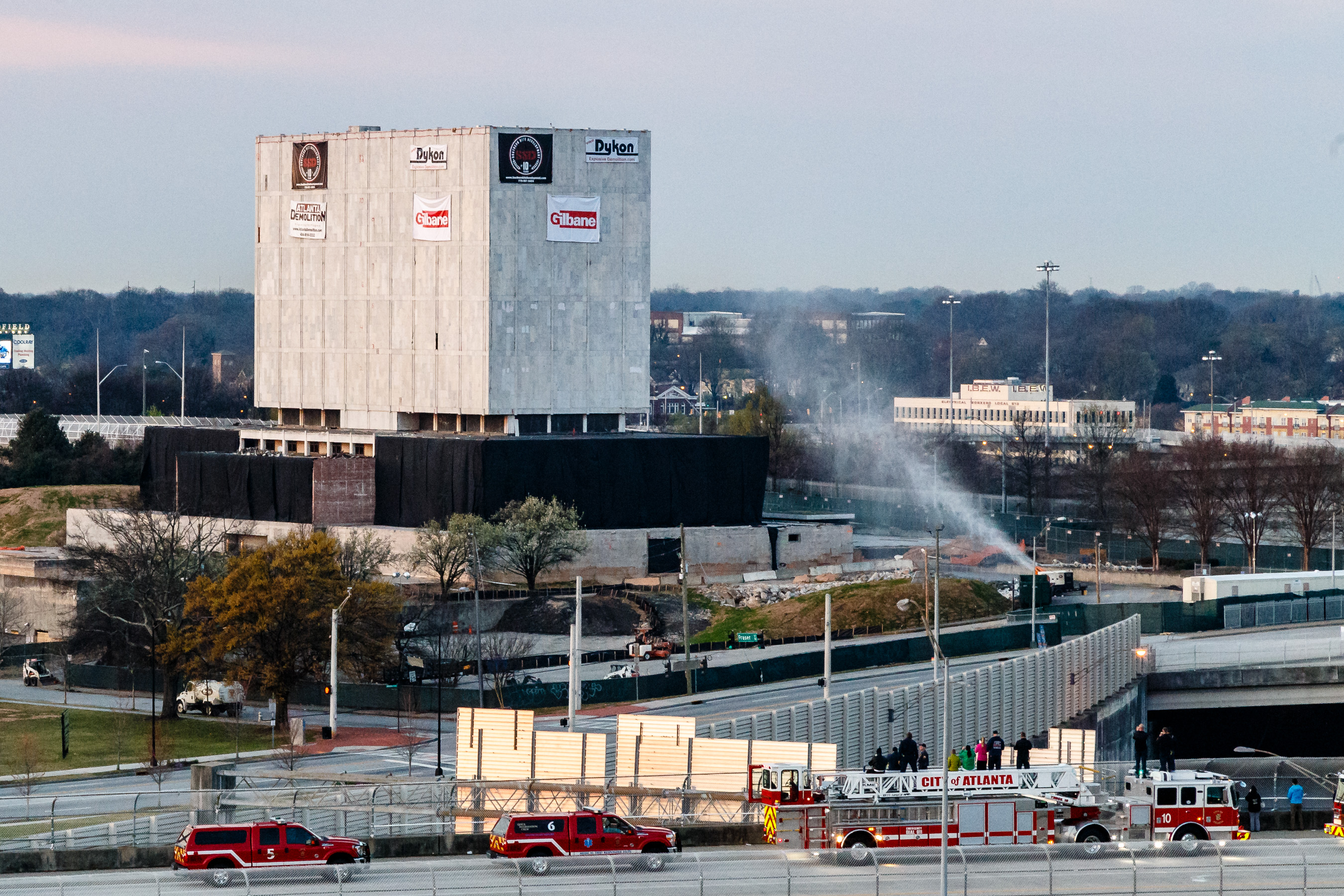
The downtown facility prior to demolition by implosion in 2017

After the archives were moved out to the current facility in Morrow, the old downtown building, sometimes called the "White Ice Cube," was occasionally used as a movie filming location, such as for Ant-Man in 2014. On March 5, 2017, the former downtown archive location was imploded so the site could be cleared in preparation for a new judicial complex. The Nathan Deal Judicial Center opened on the site of the original archives location in February 2020.

In April 2001, the Georgia General Assembly endorsed a public-private partnership to construct a new archival facility near Clayton State University in Morrow, Georgia, and adjacent to the Southeast Regional Branch of the National Archives (completed in 2004). Groundbreaking took place on October 30 of that year and the Archives opened its new building on May 6, 2003. Since that time the facility has been awarded design awards by the American Institute of Architects at the state, regional, and national levels.

== Collections ==
The Georgia Archives' collections include the founding documents of the state, such as the Royal Charter that created the colony of Georgia in 1733 and the Ratification of the United States Constitution, the 1788 document that made Georgia a state. Important collections include the official records of Governors, from the Journal of Georgia's first Royal Governor in 1754 to the records of the current Governor. Acts of the General Assembly also span from the acts of the first Assembly in 1755 to the present. Other collections include records of interest to genealogists, land surveyors, state and local government officials, teachers, and students.

== 2012 closure ==
On Sept. 13, 2012, Georgia Secretary of State, Brian Kemp, announced that the Georgia Archive would close to the public as of Nov. 1, 2012. Reason for the closure was cited as a 3% budget cut ($732,626). Public access to records would be limited to scheduled appointments. SOS Kemp stated that he regretted the closure and would "fight during this legislative session to have this cut restored."

The decision to close the archive to the public was met with backlash from the public, as well as organizations for archivists, librarians, genealogists, and other scholarly groups. A Facebook page called Georgians Against Closing State Archives gained over 2,000 members in less than a week and a petition on Change.org collected over 17,000 signatures.

On October 18, 2012, Governor Deal issued a press release announcing that the Georgia Archives would remain open. The Secretary of State's budget would receive $125,000, which would allow the Archive to remain open through June 2013. After this time, the state would seek to turn the Archives over to the University System of Georgia. The money added to the Secretary of State's budget was not enough to prevent layoffs. Five employees lost their jobs on November 1.
