= Walter McElreath =

American politician (1867–1951)

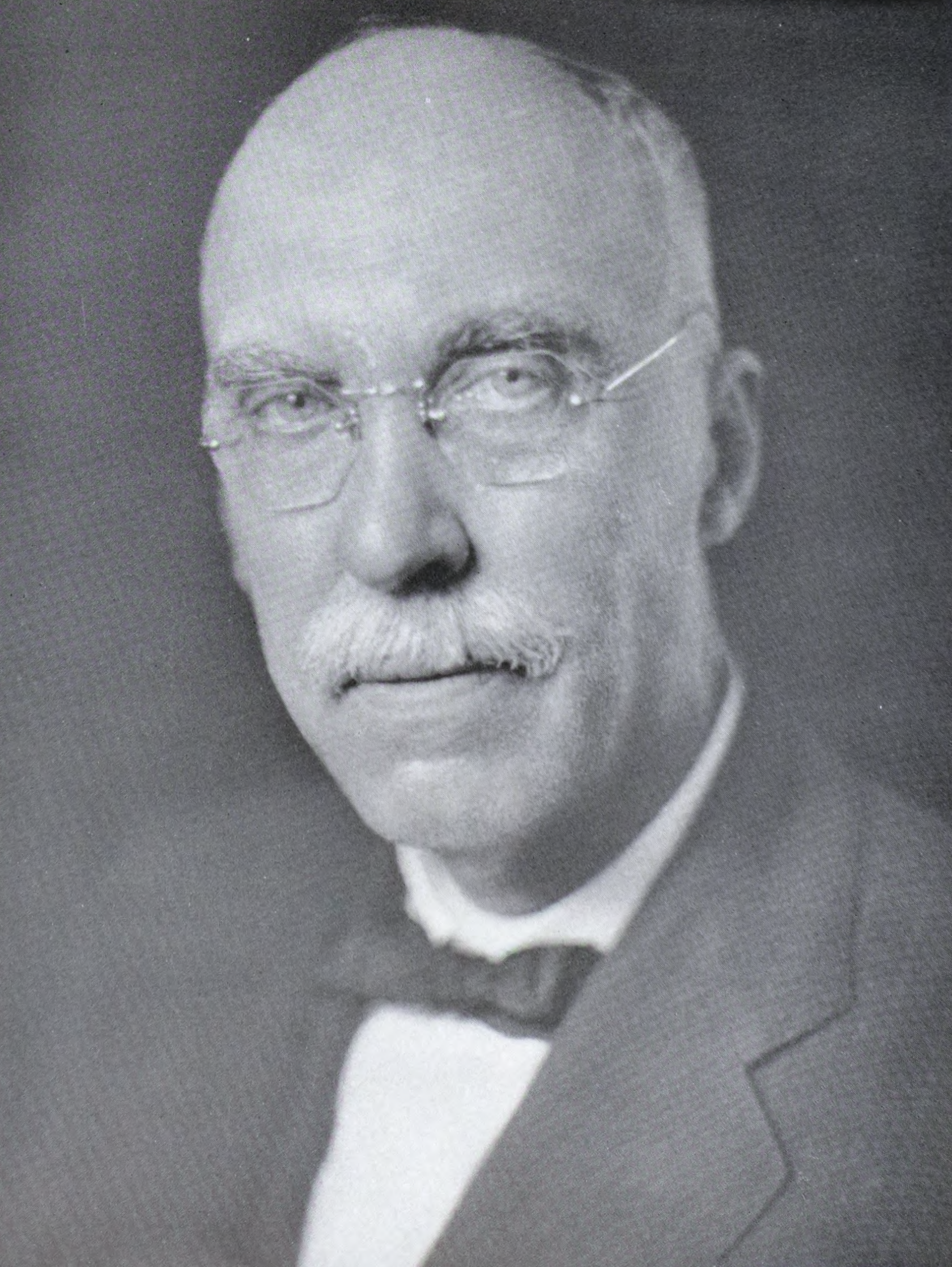
McElreath circa 1938

Walter McElreath (July 17, 1867 – December 6, 1951) was an American lawyer, legislator, bank executive, and author in Atlanta, Georgia. McElreath was a member of the Georgia House of Representatives from 1909 until 1912. He was one of the founders and the first leader of the Atlanta History Center and its McElreath Hall is named after him.

McElreath was born in Lost Mountain, Georgia. He studied at Powder Springs High School and then Washington and Lee University in Lexington, Virginia.

McElreath wrote about the Cotton States and International Exposition in his memoirs. He wrote an autobiography. He also wrote about Georgia's state constitution. The Atlanta History Center has a collection of his papers.
