= J. J. Haverty =

American art collector (c.1858–1939)

J.J. Haverty
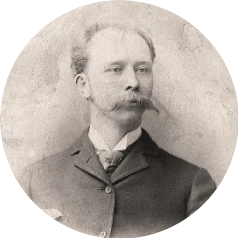
- Born: James Joseph Haverty c. 1858; Atlanta, Georgia
- Died: October 18, 1939 (aged 80–81)
- Occupations: Art collector, furniture businessman
- Known for: Founding Havertys

James Joseph "J. J." Haverty (c. 1858–October 18, 1939) was the founder of Haverty Furniture Co., headquartered in Atlanta, Georgia.

== Biography ==
Haverty was born in Atlanta in around 1858, to Irish immigrants Thomas and Margaret Cannon Haverty. Haverty also was a devout Catholic who was named a Knight of St. Gregory by Pope Pius XI and helped found the Cathedral of Christ the King in Atlanta. He began his first job, as a clerk for local dry goods merchant John Ryan, when he was fourteen. He also took Havertys public just before the stock market crash of 1929.

In 1885, he started an emporium in downtown Atlanta with his brother, Charles. In 1889, he partnered with Amos G. Rhodes to start a law firm, which became known as Rhodes, Snook & Haverty after P. H. Snook joined it in 1894. In 1908, the Rhodes-Haverty partnership was dissolved, at which point Haverty founded the Havertys furniture company, along with his son, Clarence, and other business associates.

He has been called the first "important collector of works of art" in Atlanta, with an eye for American Impressionist and Realist paintings, including work by Childe Hassam, Maria Turner, Albert P. Ryder, Jonas Lie and Henry O. Tanner. During the 1920s, he was a major supporter of New York's Grand Central Art Galleries, and he organized a series of successful exhibitions of American art at the Atlanta Biltmore Hotel. These events led to the creation of Atlanta's High Museum of Art. Many Haverty collection paintings were donated posthumously to the High and remain in the museum's permanent collection.

Haverty is buried, along with other family members, in Atlanta's Westview Cemetery.
