= Georgia Governor's Mansion =

Official home of governor of Georgia, US

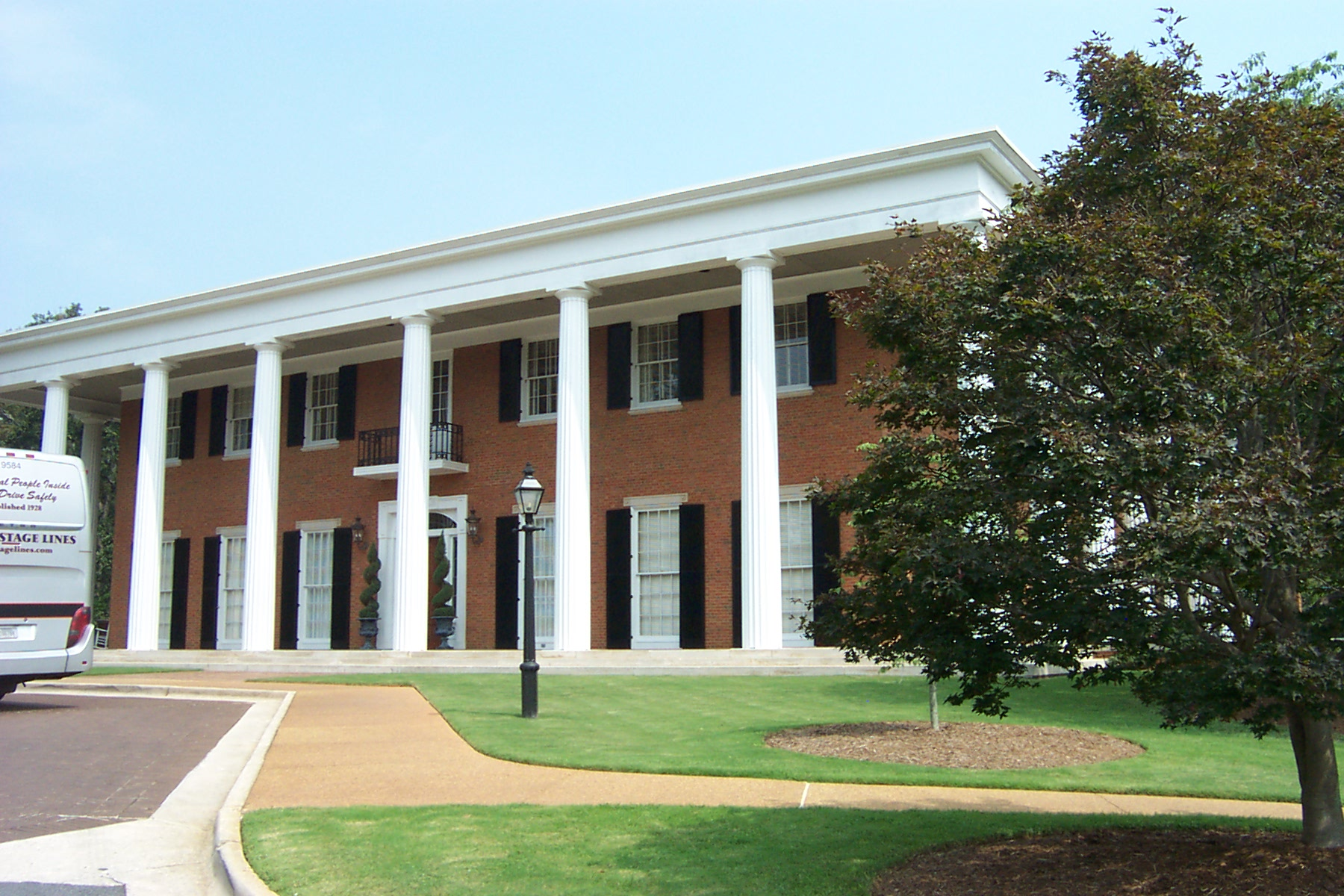
- The Georgia Governor's Mansion in 2007

- Location within Atlanta

General information
- Architectural style: Greek Revival
- Location: 391 West Paces Ferry Road NW, Atlanta, Georgia, U.S.
- Coordinates: 33.8464°N 84.3992°W
- Current tenants: Brian Kemp
- Construction started: 1964
- Completed: 1967
- Opened: January 1, 1968
- Cost: US$1,000,000 (approx.)
- Owner: State of Georgia
- Landlord: Georgia Building Authority

Technical details
- Floor count: 3
- Floor area: 24,000 sq ft (2,200 m²)
- Grounds: 18 acres (7.3 ha)

Design and construction
- Architect: A. Thomas Bradbury
- Main contractor: Robert Company

Other information
- Number of rooms: 30

Website
- Official website

The Governor's Mansion is the official home of the governor of the U.S. state of Georgia. The mansion is located at 391 West Paces Ferry Road NW, in the Tuxedo Park neighborhood of the affluent Buckhead district of Atlanta.

== Construction ==
The current Governor's Mansion is on property that belonged to former Atlanta mayor Robert Maddox (no relation to Lester Maddox), who owned a large English Tudor-style home on the site. A fire destroyed a large part of the house and Mr. Maddox sold the property to the state. The remainder of the home was demolished to construct the current mansion.

The Governor's Mansion is a three-level, 30-room, Greek Revival style home built in 1967. It stands on approximately 18 acres (73,000 m^{2}) on historic West Paces Ferry Road in north-northwest Atlanta. It was designed by Georgia architect A. Thomas Bradbury and officially opened on January 1, 1968.

In 1975, the mansion was heavily damaged in a tornado that struck west and then north Atlanta on the morning of March 24, occurring just a week after Governor Busbee moved in after his inauguration, and necessitating a renovation. It also led to the tornado being called the "governor's tornado", the worst to hit the city until the 2008 storm that hit downtown. Later in 2008, the front door was damaged by fire during another renovation on the afternoon of September 11. The Atlanta Fire Department quickly extinguished the fire, and determined through thermal imaging that the fire had not spread inside the wall. Few people were present and nobody was injured, as it was after work hours, and the governor and his wife were away.

=== Exterior ===
The house covers 24,000 square feet (2,200 m^{2}) and has a total of 30 Doric columns around the porches. These columns are made from California redwoods and are each 24 feet (7 m) high. They are hollowed out and specially treated on the inside to handle water drainage from the roof. The setting is park-like with numerous trees. On the grounds is the swimming pool, tennis courts, children's play area, and the greenhouse. The centerpiece of the entrance is a Georgia marble fountain with three large flagpoles.

=== Interior ===
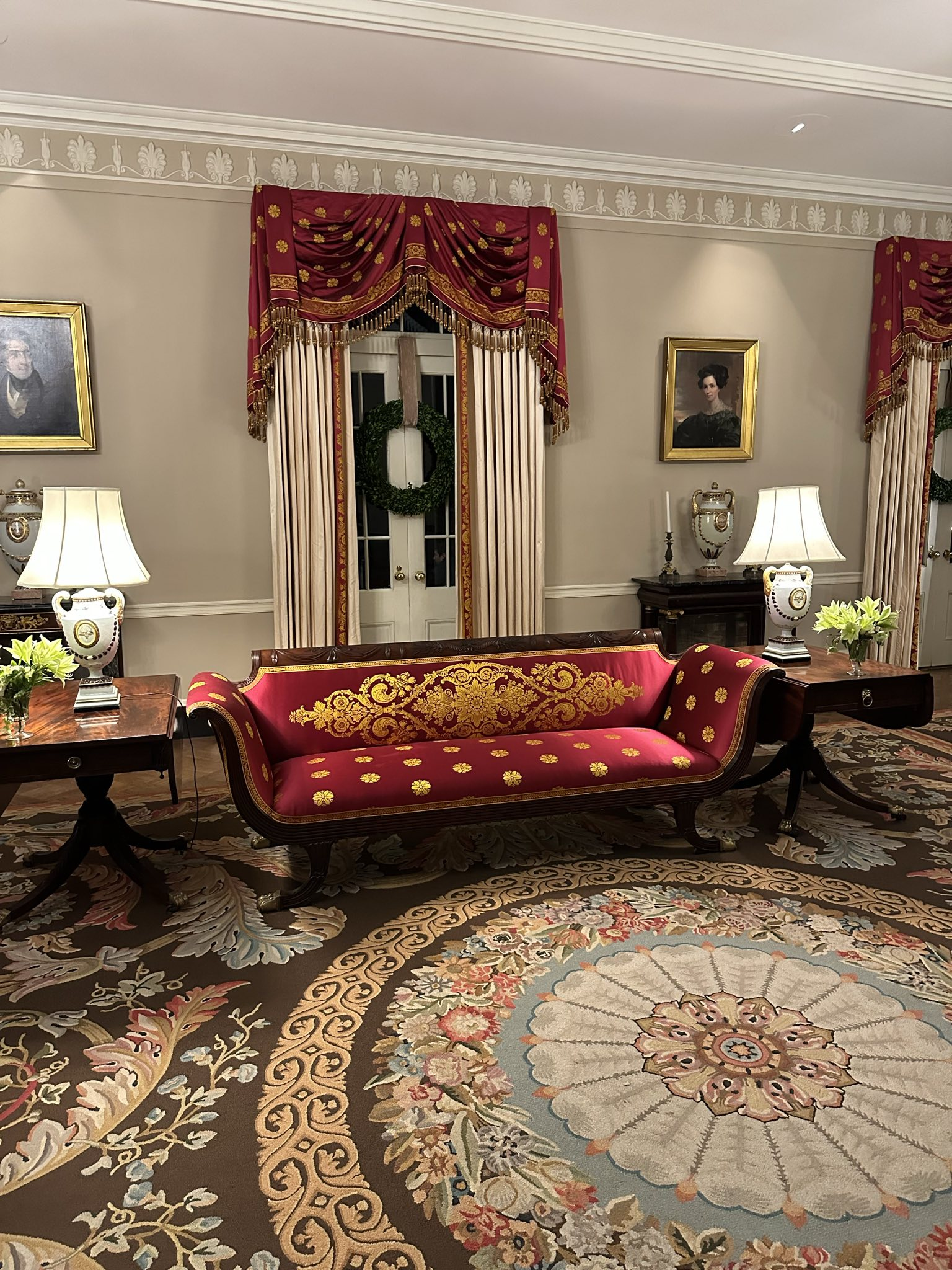
The State Drawing Room

The mansion has three levels: a lower level, the main level, and the upper level. The lower level has various rooms supporting the mansion. The ballroom is located on this level. The ballroom has a capacity of 175 for formal dinner and has uses for smaller functions as well. The pool and outside patio are also off this level.

The main floor can be considered the State Floor. The majority of the rooms on this floor are used for official entertaining. The rooms also can be used for day-to-day activities. The Entrance Hall is the main entrance. Flanking the right side is the Georgia Library containing books written by Georgia authors. Flanking the left of the entrance is the guest bedroom, which is the only bedroom on the main floor. Toward the back of the mansion is the Circular Hall with its grand staircase. Located on the right is the State Dining Room and on the left the State sitting room. They are both used for formal state functions. The back center of the entrance hall contains the powder room on the right, Family Dining Room in front, and the Family Sitting Room to the left. The kitchen is in the back corner of the dining room. These are the three rooms used regularly by the family since this is the kitchen of the mansion.

The upper floor contains the Governor's private living quarters. This level contains among other features the Governor's Mansion office, first lady's office, and family living room. There are several special bedrooms on this floor. The Presidential Suite with its own sitting room, bedroom, and bath has a commanding view of the front lawn. The Carter Bedroom, named after the former president, Lincoln Bedroom, and a couple of other bedrooms are also on this level.

=== Furnishings ===
All of the furnishings in the house are considered to be museum quality and make up one of the finest Federal period collections in the United States. These furnishings were acquired by a 70-member fine arts committee while the Mansion was being constructed. It is a permanent collection and belongs to the state of Georgia. It does not change from one administration to the next.

== Public tours ==
Lester and Virginia Maddox, the first residents of the mansion, set a precedent of opening the mansion to the public for regularly scheduled tours, and that tradition has continued through today. Tours are conducted throughout the year on Tuesdays, Wednesdays and Thursdays between 10:00 a.m. and 11:30 a.m. Reservations are needed for groups of 10 or more. There is no charge.

== Previous mansions ==
Georgia Governor's Mansion 1870–1923
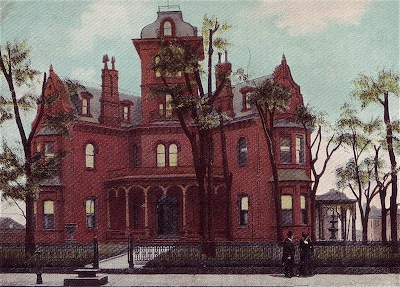
- State of Georgia Governor's Mansion 1870–1923
- Interactive map of the Georgia Governor's Mansion 1870–1923 area

Georgia has had three official mansions and one unofficial mansion in two different cities:

- The first Executive Mansion (1838–1868) is located in Milledgeville. Now known as the "Old Governor's Mansion", it is a museum and open for public tours.
- The state capital was moved from Milledgeville to Atlanta in 1868 and the first gubernatorial residence was unofficial, a three-story building on the east side of Peachtree Street, between Ellis and Baker streets, owned by Charles Larenden.
- In 1870, the first official mansion in Atlanta was purchased from John H. James at Cain (now Andrew Young Intl. Blvd.) and Peachtree and its first occupant was Rufus Bullock. Seventeen governors occupied this large Victorian home until Governor Dorsey vacated the increasingly rundown building for his summer home near the Atlanta Water Works in 1921. The old James home was demolished in 1923 and the Henry Grady Hotel was later built on that site, which is now occupied by the Westin Peachtree Plaza.
- In 1925, the state acquired the granite mansion and estate of Edwin Ansley, located at The Prado in Ansley Park. The estate housed 11 governors before it was vacated and demolished in 1968.
