= Amos G. Rhodes =

American furniture magnate (1850–1928)

Amos Giles Rhodes (1850–1928) was an Atlanta, Georgia furniture magnate. He was born in 1850 in Henderson, Kentucky. In 1875, he came to Atlanta as a laborer for the L & N Railroad. In 1879, he began a small furniture company which would grow into a large furniture business and make Rhodes a "pillar of the community". Some sources credit him with inventing the installment plan for buying furniture. Mr. A.G. Rhodes died in 1928, leaving a substantial endowment.

== Architectural legacy ==
Rhodes was associated with the following historic buildings in Atlanta:

- Rhodes Hall, his residence on Peachtree Street in Midtown
- the Rhodes-Haverty Building in Downtown Atlanta
- the A.G. Rhodes Health & Rehab building (a.k.a. A.G. Rhodes Home) in Grant Park

== Family ==
He married Amanda Dougherty in 1876
