= Shrine of the Immaculate Conception =

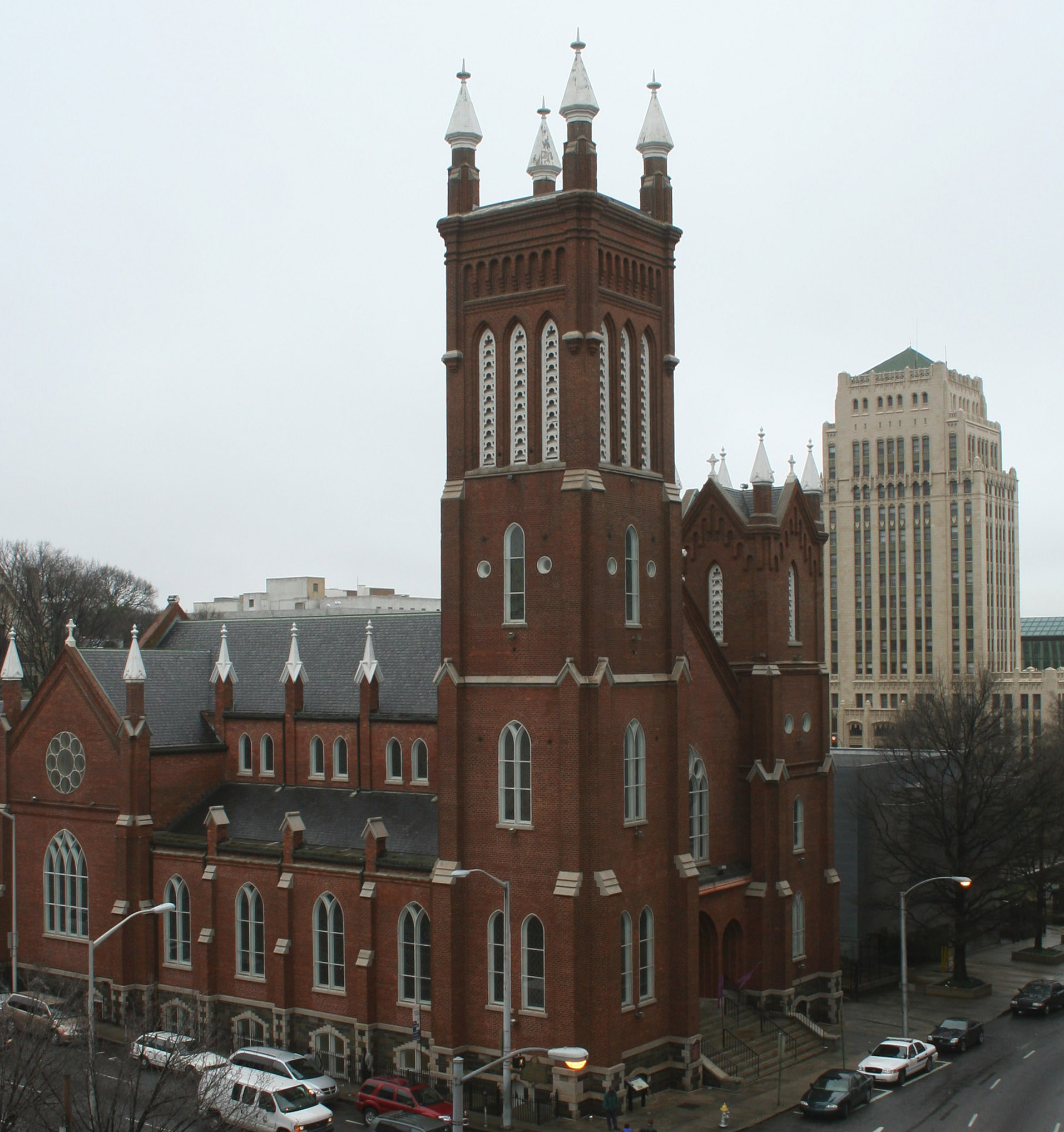
- The church in 2006, with the Atlanta City Hall in the background
- Shrine of the Immaculate Conception
- 33°45′1″N 84°23′22″W
- Location: 48 Martin Luther King Jr. Drive; Atlanta, Georgia
- Country: United States
- Denomination: Catholic
- Tradition: Roman Rite
- Website: Shrine of the Immaculate Conception

History
- Former name: Church of the Immaculate Conception (1848–1954)
- Status: Shrine
- Dedication: Immaculate Conception
- Dedicated: December 10, 1873; May 25, 1984 (rededication)

Architecture
- Architect(s): William H. Parkins; Henry Howard Smith (renovation)
- Style: Gothic Revival
- Years built: 1869–1873
- Groundbreaking: June 1869

Administration
- Province: Ecclesiastical Province of Atlanta
- Archdiocese: Roman Catholic Archdiocese of Atlanta
- Shrine of the Immaculate Conception
- U.S. National Register of Historic Places
- Area: less than one acre
- NRHP reference No.: 76000630
- Added to NRHP: December 12, 1976

The Shrine of the Immaculate Conception is a Roman Catholic church in downtown Atlanta, Georgia, United States. The current church building was completed in 1873 and is the oldest church in Atlanta, as well as one of the oldest standing buildings in the city. It was added to the National Register of Historic Places in 1976.

The church traces its history back to the 1840s, when missionary priests from Augusta and Macon would hold services in the houses of Irish Catholic immigrants who lived in the city. By 1848, the Catholic population in the area had grown enough to warrant its own dedicated building, and a wooden structure was constructed in 1848 and dedicated as the Church of the Immaculate Conception the following year. During the American Civil War, the church's pastor, Thomas O'Reilly, convinced officials in the Union Army to spare the building and several nearby structures from destruction during their occupation of Atlanta. However, the church was severely damaged during the war and as the congregation grew during the Reconstruction era, it became evident that a larger building was needed.

In 1869, work commenced on a new brick structure, designed by Atlanta architect William H. Parkins in the Gothic Revival style, which was completed and dedicated in 1873. The church continued to grow through the late 1800s and early 1900s, and several parishes were carved out of the church's parish as the city's population increased. However, due to a change in demographics starting in the early 1900s, the church began to decline in membership, and by the late 1940s, there were discussions on selling the church. However, instead, the bishop of the church's diocese oversaw a restoration that was completed by 1954, when the church was dedicated as a shrine. In 1958, the church was placed under the care of the Franciscans. In 1982, the church suffered from a massive electrical fire that nearly destroyed the entire building, but it was restored by 1984. In 1987, the Franciscans returned management of the church to the Archdiocese of Atlanta, and their appointed priest, John Adamski, made sweeping changes to the church, such as by expanding outreach to the city's LGBT population and to people with AIDS, working with other nearby churches to provide more services to the area's homeless population, and opening the church to the public for guided tours to attract contributions from tourists. By the mid-2000s, the church had an estimated 325 families in its congregation, and roughly a third of its congregants were LGBT.

== History ==
=== Background ===
The city now known as Atlanta was founded in 1837 under the name Terminus, in reference to its location as the "terminus" for the Western and Atlantic Railroad that had been built in north Georgia. Over the next several years, the city grew in size and importance, becoming a major railroad junction for the southeastern United States. Many of the people who had worked on the railroad's construction and operation were immigrants, and by 1850, of the roughly 2,500 people who lived in the city, about 10 percent had been born outside of the United States. These immigrants were primarily Irish Catholics who maintained their religion after settling in the area, which at the time was under the jurisdiction of the Roman Catholic Diocese of Charleston. Beginning in 1845, priests from other Georgia cities such as Augusta and Macon would travel to the city to preach and perform Mass in the houses of the railroad workers. The oldest records from this mission parish date to 1846, when a baptism was conducted on August 9. From this time until 1849, John Barry served as the parish priest.

=== First church building ===
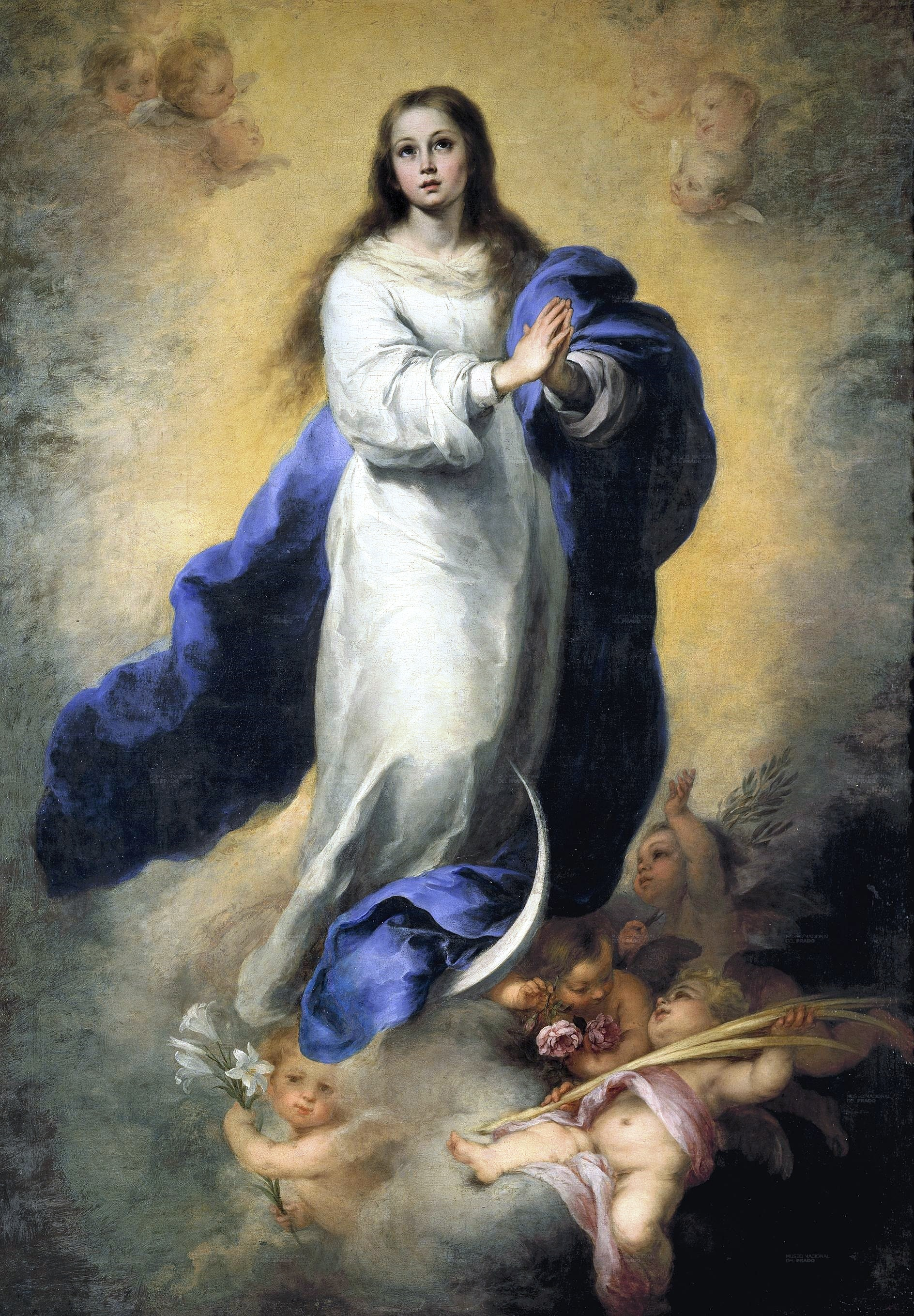
A copy of The Immaculate Conception of El Escorial hung behind the altar in the parish's first church building.

Through the 1840s, the Irish Catholic population of Atlanta continued to increase, driven primarily by immigration from Ireland due to the Great Famine. By 1848, the parish's population had grown large enough to necessitate a permanent church building. On February 23 of that year, a land lot located one block from Atlanta City Hall was purchased by the parish for $300 and construction commenced on a new building. Work on this new church was completed later that year, making it one of the first in the city to be built in the city. (Note: Multiple sources, including an authorized history of the Roman Catholic Archdiocese of Atlanta, state that the church building was completed in 1848. However, in a 1969 book, Atlanta historian Franklin Garrett stated that the building was "erected in 1850 or 1851". A year of 1851 is also given on the Georgia historical marker located outside of the church, which was placed there in 1981.) The building was made of wood with a white painted exterior, and its front had a small porch with stairs on either side. Inside, the church's sanctuary consisted of an alcove that had the phrase "Gloria in excelsis Deo" painted around the arch. Hanging behind the altar was a painting, a copy of The Immaculate Conception of El Escorial by Bartolomé Esteban Murillo.

In early 1849, Bishop Ignatius A. Reynolds of Charleston officially dedicated this new church building and also gave it an official name of the Church of the Immaculate Conception. Prior to this, the church had no official name and was typically just referred to as the city's Catholic church. In 1850, the Roman Catholic Diocese of Savannah was formed out of the Diocese of Charleston and included all of Georgia. At this time, DeKalb County, (which Atlanta was located in), was home to 34 churches, of which only one was Catholic. On February 13, 1851, after several years of relying on missionary priests, the parish received its first permanent pastor with the installation of Jeremiah F. O'Neill of Savannah, who used the church as a base for further missionary work into north Georgia and East Tennessee. On May 2, 1852, Bishop Francis Xavier Gartland of Savannah made his first visit to the church, where he administered the sacrament of confirmation on several individuals.

=== American Civil War ===
In 1861, Thomas O'Reilly, a 30-year-old member of the clergy from County Cavan, Ireland, was named the pastor of Immaculate Conception. O'Reilly would serve as the church's pastor for 11 years, including the duration of the American Civil War, which began the same year he was appointed to that position. During the war, the church building was used as a military hospital for wounded soldiers. O'Reilly during this time ministered to wounded soldiers from both the Confederate and the Union armies, and on March 16, 1864, he was given a commission as an official military chaplain for the Confederacy. On September 2, 1864, during the Atlanta campaign, Union General William Tecumseh Sherman's army captured Atlanta. Much of his army was made up of Irish Catholic immigrants, and Sherman was largely viewed as being a Catholic himself. (Note: While Sherman's religious views have been a source of debate amongst historians, he was largely perceived as a Catholic during the American Civil War. See William Tecumseh Sherman#Religious views for more information.) Following the city's capture, Sherman ordered the civilian population to evacuate the city, though O'Reilly disobeyed his orders. At the time, O'Reilly was the only Catholic chaplain available in the area. and he continued to minister to soldiers in the city, including to many of Sherman's troops. In November, Sherman ordered that all useful infrastructure in the city be burned before he commenced with his March to the Sea. However, O'Reilly, convinced one of Sherman's officers, Henry Warner Slocum, to spare the church from destruction. O'Reilly alluded to a rebellion amongst the army's Catholic soldiers if the church were allowed to be destroyed, and Sherman acquiesced to his requests, stationing several guards around the church. As a result of O'Reilly's actions, Immaculate Conception, as well as several other nearby churches, the city hall, and several residential buildings in downtown, were among the only buildings to not be destroyed. Years later, in 1945, the Atlanta Historical Society would honor O'Reilly's contributions to the city with a memorial on the grounds of the city hall.

=== New church building ===
Despite being spared from complete destruction, the church building had been severely damaged by shelling that had occurred during the conflict, and the building's use as a hospital had left the floors stained with blood. However, the church's congregation continued to grow in the Reconstruction era as the city recovered from the war. In 1866, four members of the Sisters of Mercy opened a day school and a boarding school for the parish. The church's Sunday school had roughly 400 members in 1867, while the church itself claimed 900 members in 1871. Around this time, J. J. Haverty, a future businessman who would go on to found the furniture company Havertys, served as an altar boy for O'Reilly. In 1868, Redemptorists visited Georgia and, during a week-long stay in Atlanta, heard 5,500 confessions and saw 23 converts join the church. That same year, the capital of Georgia was relocated to Atlanta, and construction on the new capitol building commenced one block away from Immaculate Conception. With the growth of both the city and the church in the postwar era, the wooden building proved insufficient for their needs, and the parishioners decided to move forward with the construction of a new church.

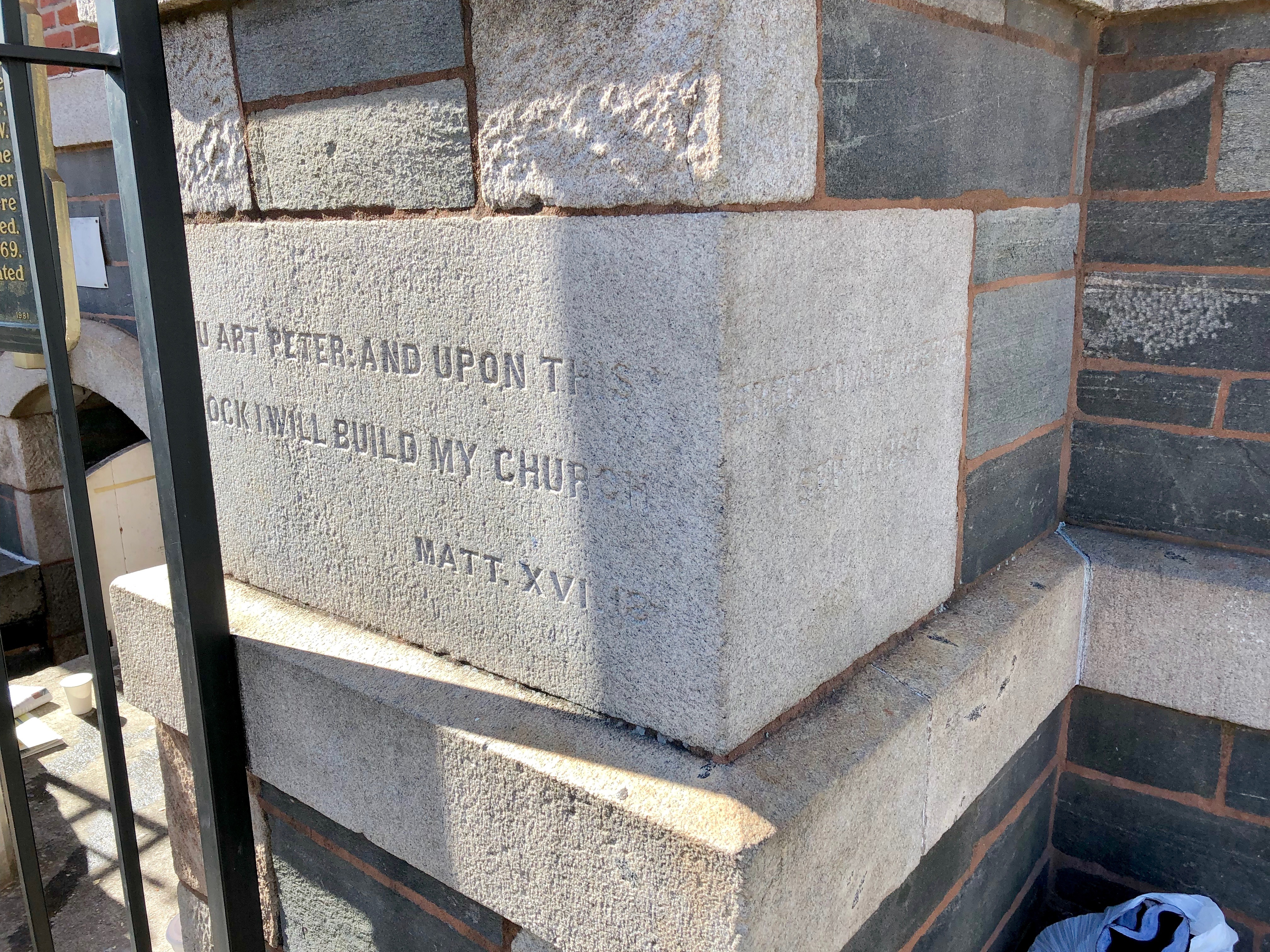
The cornerstone of the church was dedicated on September 1, 1869.

In 1869, the wooden church building was relocated to a corner of the church's property to allow the construction of a new brick building in its place. Local architect William H. Parkins was selected to design this new building, and it was one of the first major projects he would work on during his career in Atlanta. Parkins, who was the first architect to practice in Atlanta, would go on to have a lengthy career and would design several other churches in the city, of which today only Immaculate Conception still stands. Groundbreaking for the new structure happened in June 1869, and the stone for the building's foundation was provided by Patrick Lynch, a local Irish businessman in the stone industry who was responsible for some of the earliest paved streets in Atlanta. On September 1, the cornerstone of the building was laid. At the accompanying dedication, Bishop Augustin Verot of Savannah presided, while noted Catholic pastor and poet Abram Joseph Ryan delivered a sermon. Construction on the new building continued for several years, at a cost of between $75,000 and $80,000. (Note: Sources vary on the exact cost of the construction.) In 1872, during the building's construction, O'Reilly died, with his funeral held in the old wooden church. His body would later be interred in a crypt underneath the main altar in the new church. Primary construction on the building lasted until 1873, and on December 10 of that year, the building was dedicated in a ceremony presided over by Bishop William Hickley Gross of Savannah. The wooden building was demolished the same year, and in fact, all of the buildings that had been spared destruction during the occupation of Atlanta would be demolished within the next 20 years. Despite the dedication, additional minor construction work continued until 1880, and the church's high altar would not be dedicated until January 10 of that year. Also in 1880, Immaculate Conception's pastor James O'Brien donated land for St. Joseph's Infirmary. This institution, operated by the Sisters of Mercy, was the first permanent hospital in the city.

In 1880, a rectory was constructed adjacent to the church. That same year, with the growth of the Catholic population in Atlanta, a second parish for the city was established out of territory spun off from Immaculate Conception. This new parish was originally known as Saints Peter and Paul, but after the construction of a new church building along Peachtree Street in 1898, it became known as the Sacred Heart parish. In 1903, another parish was established from former Immaculate Conception territory, and by 1908 there were four Catholic churches in the city. The late 1800s and early 1900s also saw several notable pastors serving at Immaculate Conception, including Benjamin Joseph Keiley and Emmet M. Walsh, who would both later become bishops. Also during this time, many Irish Travellers in the region would meet at Immaculate Conception once a year on April 28 to hold a mass funeral for their dead, with many Travellers buried in the city's Oakland and Westview cemeteries. By 1914, Immaculate Conception had a membership of between 1,300 and 1,500 and supported sixteen missions.

=== Decline and restorations ===
Through the first half of the 20th century, changes in Atlanta's demographics and church organization hurt Immaculate Conception. The population of downtown, where the church was located, began to decline during this time as the population spread to other parts of the city and surrounding metropolitan area, and many new parishes were established to cater to these areas, causing Immaculate Conception's membership to decline. During this time, despite a significant growth in the area's population, downtown became less residential and more centered on government and business activities, and by World War II, the parish only had about 100 families in their membership. During the mid-20th century, Auxiliary Bishop Francis Edward Hyland of Savannah-Atlanta (Note: The Diocese of Savannah had become the Diocese of Savannah-Atlanta in 1937 to reflect the growth in the Catholic population of Atlanta.) favored selling the property, but Bishop Gerald O'Hara instead opted to renovate the historic church, delegating that authority to Monsignor James Grady and Donald Kiernan. Their efforts included a large fundraising program and a renovation of the church that cost $100,000. The renovations were completed by 1954, in time for the one hundredth anniversary of the promulgation of Ineffabilis Deus, which codified the Catholic doctrine of the Immaculate Conception. The church was rededicated on June 2 of that year, being given the status of a shrine. Two years later, the church became a part of the Roman Catholic Diocese of Atlanta.

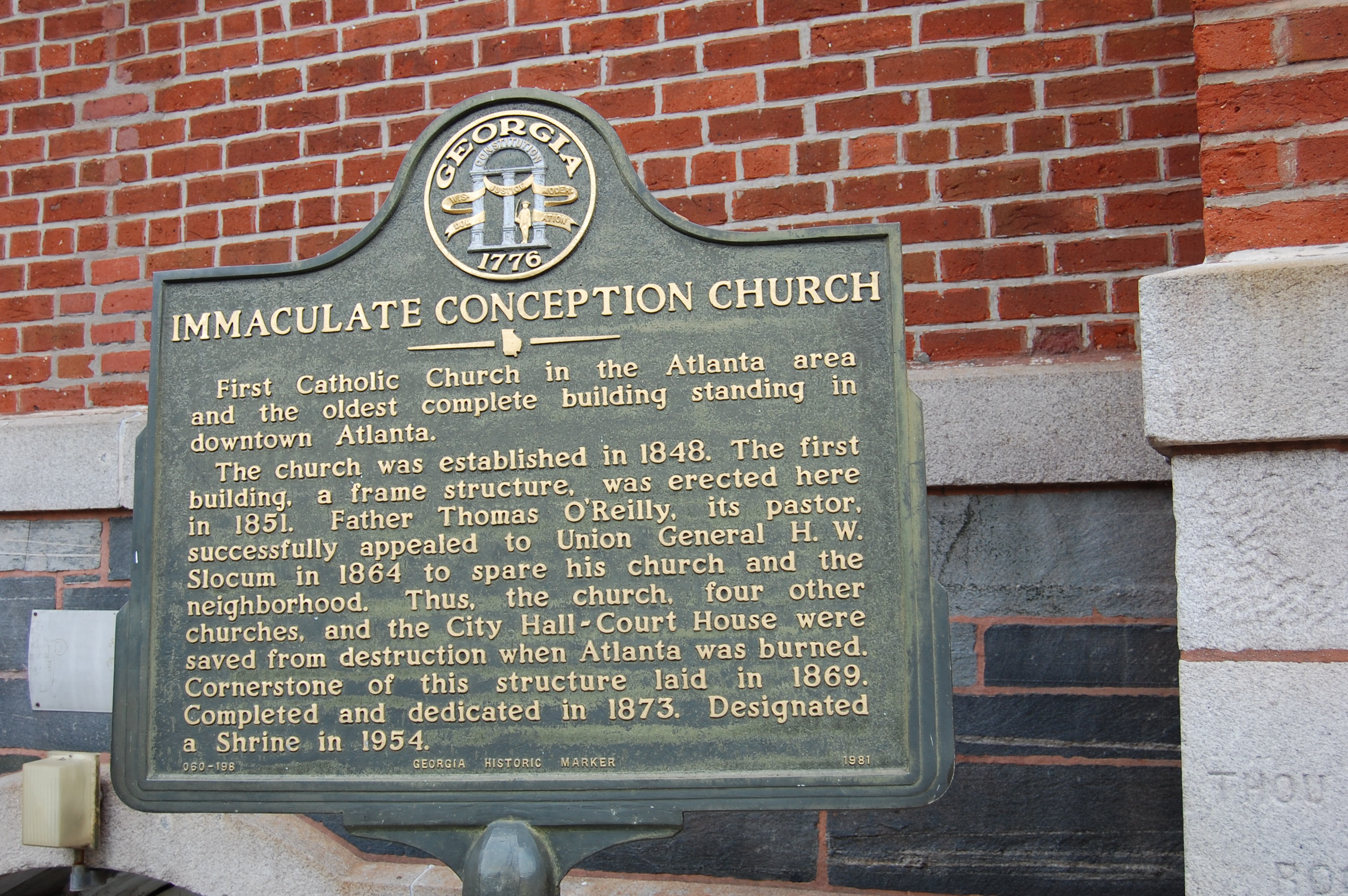
A Georgia historical marker erected near the church in 1981

In 1958, the Bishop of Atlanta appointed the Franciscans to take over operations at Immaculate Conception. The Franciscans have a long history of acting as caretakers for Marian shrines, and at the time they had begun to focus on churches located in downtown areas. During this time, the Franciscans took a custodial approach to managing the church and several services offered by the church began to be shut down due to the small membership. For instance, by 1970, the church was no longer operating its parochial school due to a lack of students. On December 12, 1976, the church was added to the National Register of Historic Places, and several years later in 1981, the Georgia Historical Commission erected a Georgia historical marker outside the church. During this time, the church saw a demographic shift as more African Americans became church members, constituting about 40 percent of the congregation by the 1980s. Under Franciscan control, the church also expanded its charitable operations, focusing on more outreach to the local homeless population. The church worked with the nearby Central Presbyterian Church (which operated a night shelter for homeless in the area) to begin a weekly meal program.

On August 6, 1982, the church experienced a massive fire caused by faulty wiring that resulted in almost the entire structure being destroyed. Only the exterior brick structure of the church was left standing. The main altar had been destroyed, though the two side altars remained intact. Following this, the church underwent a massive restoration project that took roughly two years to complete, during which time services were held at the nearby Central Presbyterian Church. The project, which cost about $4 million, was overseen by architect Henry Howard Smith, the son of noted Atlanta architect Francis Palmer Smith. On May 25, 1984, the church was rededicated. Following the fire, the church continued to experience financial difficulties, and in 1987, due in part to this, the Franciscans left the church and control was transferred back to the Archdiocese of Atlanta. (Note: The Diocese of Atlanta was elevated to the status of archdiocese in 1962.)

=== Recent history ===
Following the return of the church to archdiocese control, the chancellor of Atlanta recommended changes to the church to attract tourists while still maintaining their community outreach efforts. John Adamski was appointed priest by the archdiocese in 1988 and set about making largescale changes to the church. He restructured the church's administration and made changes to attract tourists, such as opening the crypt area to the public for guided tours. Adamski had also spent time in New York City, where he ministered to people with AIDS, and at Immaculate Conception he began a weekly dinner for people with AIDS as a form of evangelism to them. By the early 1990s, these dinners attracted about 100 to 120 people, and by 1992, the church had started a ministry for LGBT people, with a full-time priest to minister to people with AIDS. While Adamski's decision to minister to LGBT people divided the opinion of the church, it did lead to an increase in LGBT congregants. In 1992, the church counted about 275 households among its membership and was feeding about 500 people per week at its soup kitchen. Adamski also worked more closely with Central Presbyterian and opened a nightly emergency homeless shelter, and in 1992 they had 35 people living there. Given its central location in the city near several prominent government buildings, the church also began to be used during this time as a coordinating location for protests, such as anti-abortion protests at the capitol building. In 1998, the church celebrated its 150th anniversary with a theme of "People Living Church". Adamski departed from Immaculate Conception the following year.

In 2000, the church began a $1.4 million restoration project that was completed the following year. By the mid-2000s, the church counted about 325 families in its membership, and while it had historically catered to an Irish Catholic congregation, its congregation was split roughly evenly between white and black people, with the latter mostly made up of African Americans and Haitian Americans. Additionally, due in large part to Adamski's ministry, about a third of the congregation was LGBT. The structure itself stands as one of the oldest buildings in downtown and one of only two buildings that began construction in 1869, alongside the Georgia Railroad Freight Depot.

== Architecture and design ==
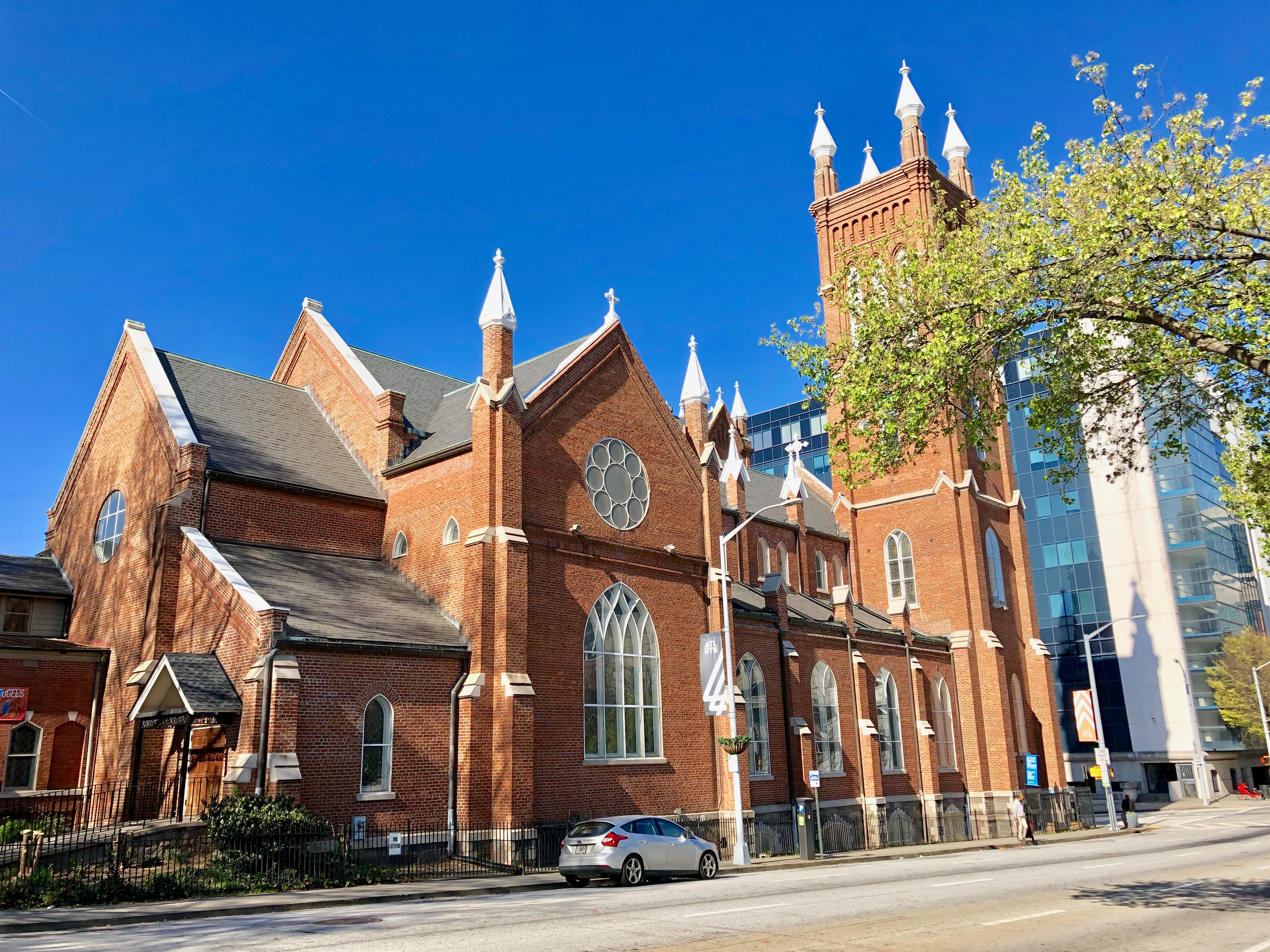
The side of the church along Martin Luther King Jr. Drive SW

The church is located at 48 Martin Luther King Jr. Drive (formerly Hunter Street SW), at the intersection of that street and Central Avenue, and it shares its city block with Central Presbyterian. The main structure is a one-story brick building with a cruciform, modified rectangular layout that covers an area of 145 feet (44 m) by 86 feet (26 m). Much of the exterior brickwork is original and was reused following the 1982 fire and subsequent restoration, though the building now uses cement mortar instead of the original lime mortar. The roof is made of Virginia Slate and consists of intersecting gabled sections. The front of the building has three doorways beneath three pointed arch entryways, with the main front gable topped with an iron cross. These doorways face Central Avenue and lead to a large granite stairway. On one side of the front there is a three-story tower with a cross-gabled roof, while on the other side is a four-story bell tower complete with a belfry on top. Both towers feature finials. The exterior of the building also included buttresses, galvanized iron pinnacles, and pointed arch windows. The exterior also features cast iron ridge castings. Attached to this structure is a 2.5-story rectory with a jerkinhead roof. The overall design of the church is in the Gothic Revival style, while Parkins incorporated some elements from French Gothic architecture (such as the three-part front portal and a rose window) and High Victorian Gothic architecture.

The sanctuary is illuminated by 12 chandeliers. Lining the aisles are roughly 50 stained glass windows that have religious symbolism. The ceiling contains a cloverleaf-design painting that depicts the 12 apostles and was designed by Georgian artist Henry Barnes during the building's 1980s restoration. Concerning further artwork in the building, there is a statue of the Pietà that was carved in Italy and survived the 1982 fire. The interior columns and the capitals are slender and made of iron. The main altar is made of marble, and it incorporates pieces of marble from the original altar that was destroyed in the 1982 fire. Immediately beneath this main altar, located in the church's basement, is the grave of O'Reilly and Thomas Cleary, a successor of O'Reilly's who was buried next to him in 1884.

== See also ==
- List of oldest structures in Atlanta
- List of Roman Catholic churches in the Archdiocese of Atlanta

== Sources ==
- Barnes, John A. (1995). Irish-American Landmarks: A Traveler's Guide. Foreword by Eoin McKiernan. Detroit: Gale Research. ISBN 978-0-8103-9603-6.
- Brinsfield, John Wesley (2005). The Spirit Divided: Memoirs of Civil War Chaplains: The Confederacy. Macon, Georgia: Mercer University Press. ISBN 978-0-86554-964-7.
- Broderick, Robert C. (1958). Historic Churches of the United States. Drawings by Virginia Broderick. New York City: Wilfred Funk, Inc.
- Burch, Brian; Stimpson, Emily (2014). The American Catholic Almanac: A Daily Reader of Patriots, Saints, Rogues, and Ordinary People Who Changed the United States. New York City: Image. ISBN 978-0-553-41874-3.
- Craig, Robert Michael (2012). The Architecture of Francis Palmer Smith, Atlanta's Scholar-Architect. Athens, Georgia: University of Georgia Press. ISBN 978-0-8203-2898-0.
- Czarnopys, Theresa Santa; Santa, Thomas M. (1998). Marian Shrines of the United States: A Pilgrim's Travel Guide. Liguori, Missouri: Liguori Publications. ISBN 978-0-7648-0227-0.
- Ferris, William R. (2013). ""A Lengthening Chain in the Shape of Memories": The Irish and Southern Culture". In Giemza, Bryan Albin (ed.). Rethinking the Irish in the American South: Beyond Rounders and Reelers. Jackson, Mississippi: University Press of Mississippi. pp. 19–35. ISBN 978-1-61703-799-3.
- Garrett, Franklin M. (1969a). Atlanta and Environs: A Chronicle of Its People and Events, 1820s-1870s. Vol. I. Athens, Georgia: University of Georgia Press. ISBN 978-0-8203-0263-8.
- Garrett, Franklin M. (1969b). Atlanta and Environs: A Chronicle of Its People and Events, 1880s-1930s. Vol. II. Athens, Georgia: University of Georgia Press. ISBN 978-0-8203-3904-7.
- "Immaculate Conception Church". Georgia Historical Society. June 16, 2014. Archived from the original on July 18, 2020.
- Gibbons, Robert (Summer 1979). "Life at the Crossroads of the Confederacy: Atlanta, 1861–1865". Atlanta Historical Journal. XXIII (2). Atlanta Historical Society: 11–72.
- Gournay, Isabelle (1993). Sams, Gerald W. (ed.). AIA Guide to the Architecture of Atlanta. Athens, Georgia: University of Georgia Press. ISBN 978-0-8203-1439-6.
- Greenberg, Ronald M.; Marusin, Sarah A., eds. (1976). The National Register of Historic Places. Vol. II. Washington, D.C.: United States Department of the Interior.
- Hanley, John (2006). The Archdiocese of Atlanta: A History. Strasbourg: Éditions du Signe. ISBN 978-2-7468-1773-9.
- Harrison, John M. (October 1944). "The Irish Influence in Early Atlanta". Atlanta Historical Bulletin. VII (29). Atlanta Historical Society: 196–211.
- Hart, Donald S. (Summer 1970). "The Mood of Atlanta—1850–1861". Atlanta Historical Bulletin. XV (2). Atlanta Historical Society: 22–42.
- King, Spencer Bidwell Jr. (June 1969). "A Yankee Who Served the South". Atlanta Historical Bulletin. XIV (2). Atlanta Historical Society: 7–30.
- Maloney, Walter H. (1992). Our Catholic Roots: Old Churches East of the Mississippi. Drawings by Thomas P. Maloney. Huntington, Indiana: Our Sunday Visitor. ISBN 978-0-87973-463-3.
- Martin, Thomas H. (1902). Atlanta and Its Builders: A Comprehensive History of the Gate City of the South. Vol. II. Century Memorial Publishing Company.
- McElreath, Walter (October 1948). "When Atlanta was Just a Big Town, and Some of its Characters". Atlanta Historical Bulletin. VIII (33). Atlanta Historical Society: 82–88.
- Mitchell, Stephen (September 1927). "A Short History of the Parish of the Immaculate Conception". Atlanta Historical Bulletin. I (1). Atlanta Historical Society: 28–46.
- Moore, Andrew S. (2007). The South's Tolerable Alien: Roman Catholics in Alabama and Georgia, 1945–1970. Baton Rouge, Louisiana: Louisiana State University Press. ISBN 978-0-8071-3573-0.
- Morgan, Thomas H. (July 1937). "Reminiscences of the Architecture and Architects of Atlanta". Atlanta Historical Bulletin. II (10). Atlanta Historical Society: 5–13.
- Morrison, Jeffrey (2019). Atlanta Underground: History from Below. Globe Pequot Press. ISBN 978-1-4930-4371-2.
- National Register of Historic Places, 1966 to 1994: Cumulative List Through January 1, 1994. Washington, D.C.: National Park Service. 1994. ISBN 978-0-89133-254-1.
- Newman, Harvey K. (Fall 1983). "Some Reflections on Religion in Nineteenth-Century Atlanta: A Research Note". Atlanta Historical Journal. XXVII (3). Atlanta Historical Society: 47–56.
- O'Hara, Arthur J. (1914). "The Diocese of Savannah". In Lafort, Remigius; Farley, John (eds.). The Catholic Church in the United States of America. Vol. III. New York City: The Catholic Editing Company. pp. 194–214.
- Reed, Wallace P., ed. (1889). History of Atlanta, Georgia: With Illustrations and Biographical Sketches of Some of Its Prominent Men and Pioneers. Syracuse, New York: D. Mason & C. ISBN 978-0-7222-0872-4.
- Sampson, Gloria (1987). Historic Churches and Temples of Georgia: A Book of Watercolors and Drawings. With an introduction by James Patrick. Macon, Georgia: Mercer University Press. ISBN 978-0-86554-242-6.
- Scharen, Christian (2004). Saliers, Don E. (ed.). Public Worship and Public Work: Character and Commitment in Local Congregational Life. Virgil Michel Series. Collegeville Township, Minnesota: Liturgical Press. ISBN 978-0-8146-6193-2.
- Smith, William Rawson (2006). Villa Clare: The Purposeful Life and Timeless Art Collection of J. J. Haverty. Macon, Georgia: Mercer University Press. ISBN 978-0-86554-992-0.
- Williams, David Salter (2008). From Mounds to Megachurches: Georgia's Religious Heritage. Athens, Georgia: University of Georgia Press. ISBN 978-0-8203-3638-1.
- Wilson, John Stainback (1871). Atlanta as it is. New York City: Little, Rennie & Co. – via Atlanta Historical Bulletin. Atlanta Historical Society. VI (24) January–April 1941.
