= Gaines Hall =

Building in Atlanta

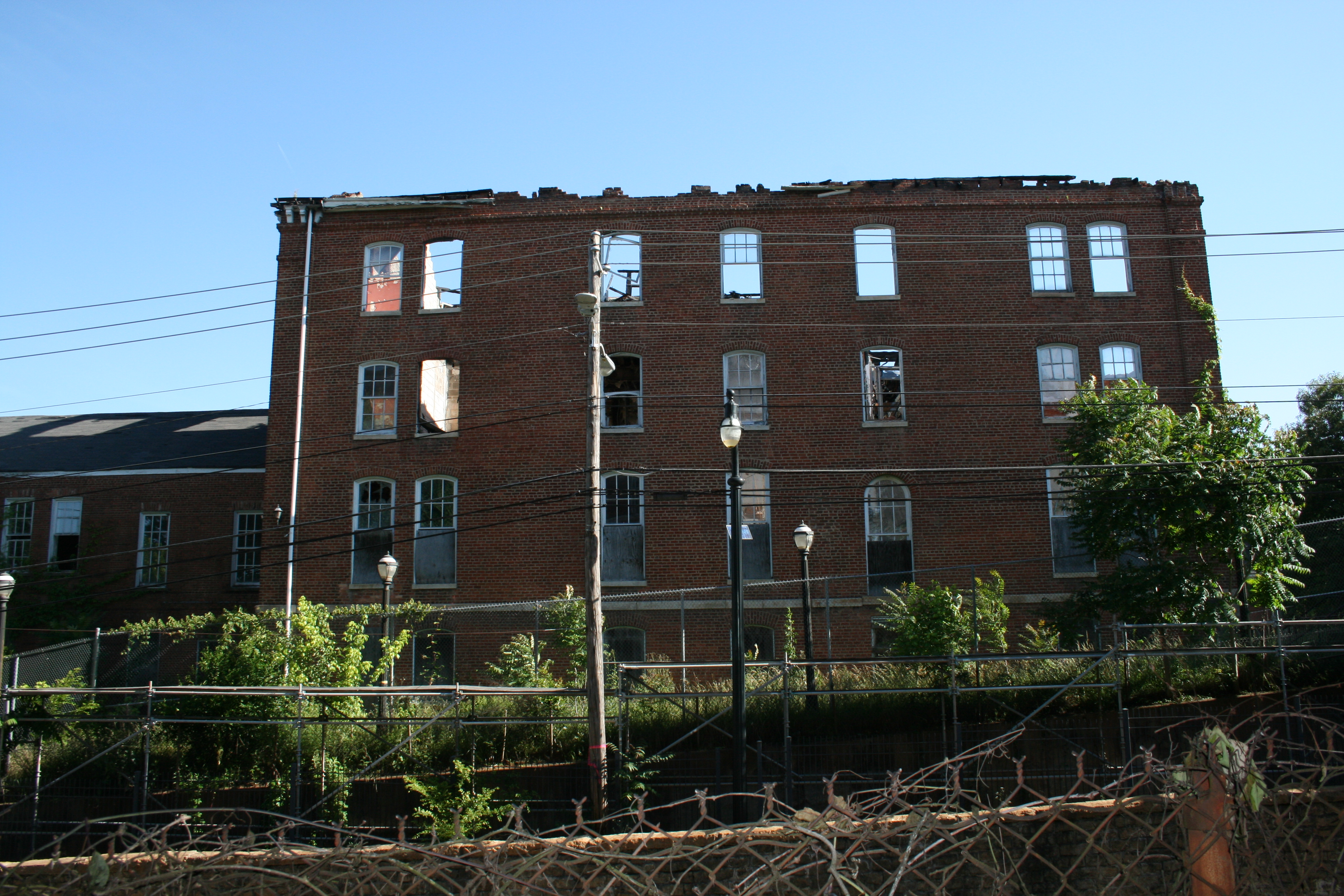
- The building in May 2015
- Interactive map of the Gaines Hall area

General information
- Type: Academic building Student accommodation
- Architectural style: Italianate
- Location: 643 Martin Luther King Jr. Drive SW, Atlanta, Georgia, United States
- Coordinates: 33°45′18″N 84°24′31″W
- Completed: 1869
- Owner: Clark Atlanta University

Technical details
- Material: Brick
- Floor count: 3

Design and construction
- Architect: William H. Parkins

Gaines Hall is a building located in the historic district of the Atlanta University Center in Atlanta, Georgia, United States. It was designed by architect William H. Parkins in the Italianate style and was built in 1869. It is one of the oldest buildings in the city.

The building, originally called North Hall, was constructed as the first permanent building for Atlanta University (now Clark Atlanta University). It originally functioned as an academic building and hosted several famous academics during the late 19th and early 20th centuries, including W. E. B. Du Bois. In 1932, Morris Brown College took ownership of Atlanta University's original campus, including Gaines Hall, and converted the building into a dormitory. In 2012, Morris Brown declared bankruptcy and the building, along with some surrounding property, was sold to the government of Atlanta. In 2018, Clark Atlanta University was awarded the property and Gaines Hall as part of a lawsuit they initiated against the city based on a deed established between the university and Morris Brown College in 1940. In the 2010s and 2020s, the building experienced several fires that severely damaged the structure, including one in 2015, two in 2023, and one in 2024.

== Site and architecture ==
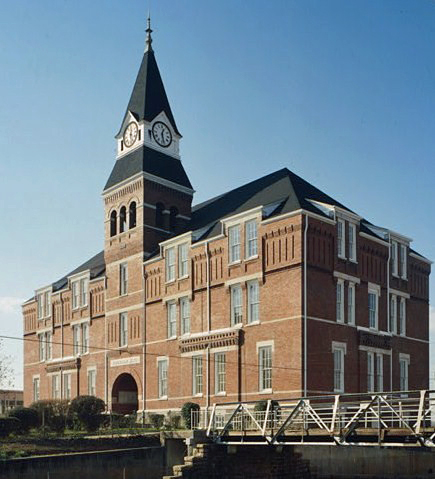
Fountain Hall (pictured 1979) is located across the street from Gaines Hall and is accessible via a footbridge that spans the road.

Gaines Hall is located at 643 Martin Luther King Jr. Drive SW, in Atlanta's Vine City neighborhood. Fountain Hall, another academic building associated with Morris Brown College, is located on the other side of the street. The two buildings can be accessed via an iron footbridge that crosses the drive.

The building consists of a three-story brick structure that rests on a granite foundation. (Note: Multiple sources state that Gaines Hall is a three-story building. However, a 1976 book on historical architecture in Atlanta states that Gaines Hall was a four-story structure.) Architect William H. Parkins designed the building, which was constructed in the Italianate style. Elements of this architectural style includes brackets along several eaves, including on the pediment of the main entrance's façade.

== History ==
=== Construction and early history ===
Gaines Hall, originally called North Hall, was constructed in 1869 as the first permanent building for Atlanta University. The university had been established following the American Civil War with the goal of educating African Americans who had been recently liberated from slavery. Funding for the building's construction was provided by the American Missionary Association and the Freedmen's Bureau. The construction of the building was accompanied by a ceremony for the laying of the cornerstone, which featured speeches from both the university's president, Edmund Asa Ware, and noted African American educator John Mercer Langston. A chorus consisting of students from Storr's School (a local educational institution for African Americans) provided music for the event.

In late 1869, classes were first held in the building, with eight teachers and about 90 students. The university initially hosted a grammar school and a normal school and received support from the government of Georgia, as the University of Georgia did not enroll African Americans. The classes were originally racially integrated, as the children of the teachers, who were white Americans, participated in the classes. A year after these classes commenced, South Hall, a building that mirrored North Hall's layout, was constructed to the south of North Hall. Several years later, in 1882, the nearby Stone Hall was opened. During the era of Jim Crow laws, W. E. B. Du Bois taught in the building.

=== Acquisition by Morris Brown College ===
In 1932, Morris Brown College moved to Atlanta University's original campus, which included Gaines Hall and several other buildings. Morris Brown had been established in 1867 and named in honor of a bishop of the African Methodist Episcopal Church. In 1940, Morris Brown College and Clark Atlanta University (Atlanta University's successor) agreed that, should the property no longer be used by Morris Brown for educational purposes, ownership would revert back to Clark Atlanta University. This deed specifically pertained to a 13-acre (5.3-hectare) territory that included Gaines Hall and Herndon Stadium. Following the transition, Gaines Hall was converted into a dormitory, and by the 1970s, the building was being used as a student accommodation for freshman women. In 1993, the American Institute of Architects called Gaines Hall the "oldest university building in Atlanta". By 2015, the building was being described by news sources as one of the oldest extant buildings in the city. That year, The Atlanta Journal-Constitution reported that the building had served as a dormitory for the college's honors program.

=== Sale to the city government ===
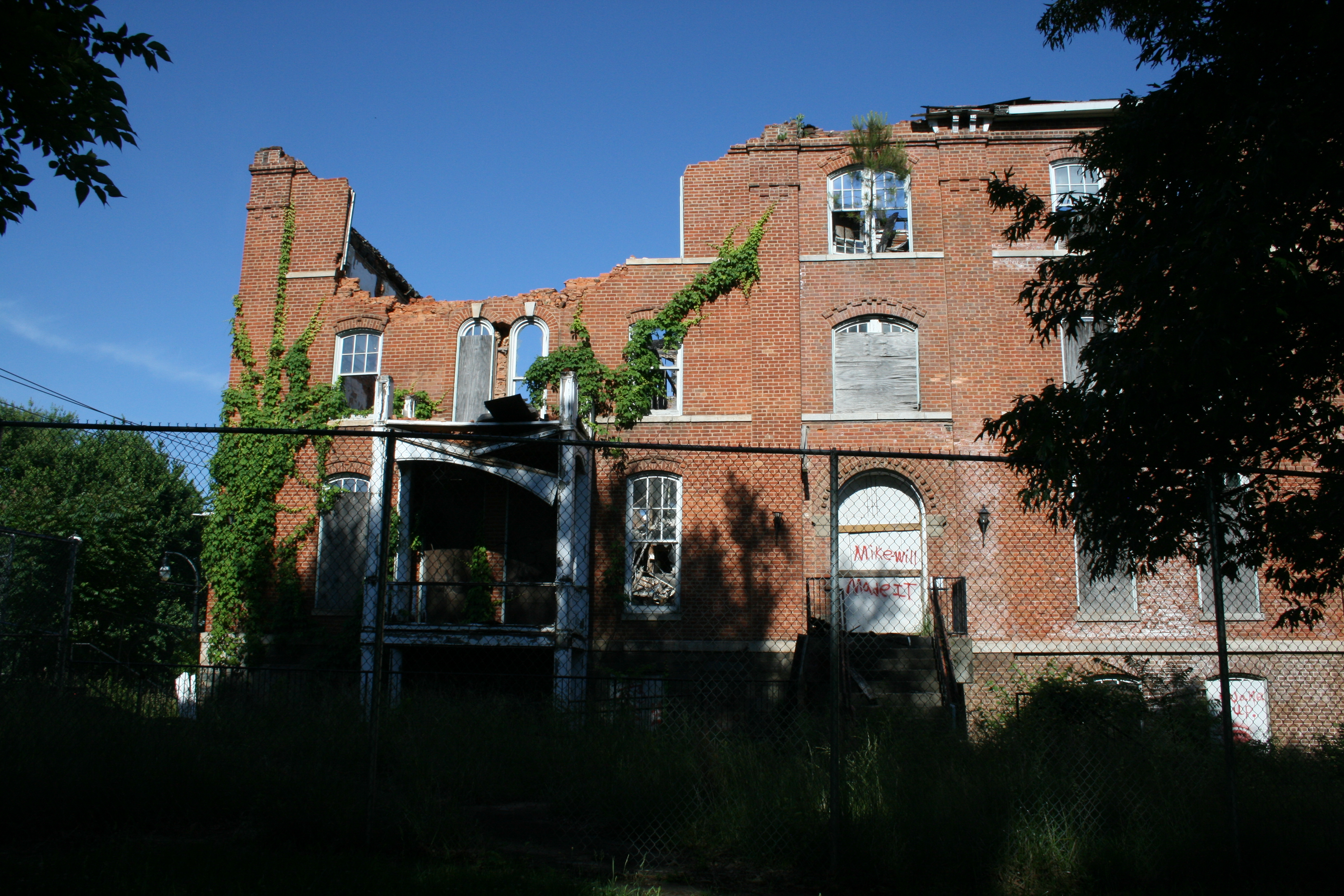
The building in May 2015

In 2012, Morris Brown declared bankruptcy, with the college having approximately $30 million (equivalent to $42 million in 2025) in debt. As a result, the college sold much of its property to Friendship Baptist Church and the government of Atlanta via its Atlanta Development Authority organization (an economic development agency, later known as Invest Atlanta). In 2014, Invest Atlanta acquired the 13-acre property containing Gaines Hall and proceeded to lease the property back to the college. At the time of the sale, the municipal government was working on a redevelopment plan for the surrounding area and had no immediate plans for Gaines Hall's future use. In total, the church and the government paid the college approximately $14.6 million ($19.9 million in 2025) for the property and buildings. In 2015, the college emerged from bankruptcy.

=== 2015 fire ===
On August 20, 2015, a fire broke out in the building, prompting a two-alarm response from the Atlanta Fire Rescue Department. The fire quickly grew in intensity, prompting responding firefighters to evacuate the building and leading to the nearby section of Martin Luther King Jr. Drive to be temporarily closed. Firefighters later said that the fire may have been started by people who were squatting in the building.

The fire significantly damaged the structure, with WAGA-TV reporting that it had been "gutted". The Atlanta Journal-Constitution reported that fire investigators recommended that the structure be demolished due to safety concerns posed to pedestrians and drivers on the nearby street, though a spokesperson for Invest Atlanta—the building's owner—said they would conduct their own investigation prior to any actions. The recommendation for demolition also elicited negative reactions from proponents of historic preservation, including responses from the Atlanta History Center and the Georgia Trust for Historic Preservation, with the latter releasing a statement discussing the building's historic significance. Mark McDonald, the chief executive officer of the Georgia Trust, highlighted restoration work on the Hancock County Courthouse in Sparta, Georgia, a building also designed by Parkins that had suffered a similarly devastating fire. On August 24, Mayor Kasim Reed said regarding Gaines Hall, "We are going to find a way to preserve it.", and the following day, several city officials and engineers went to the building to begin to assess its condition.

In March 2016, The Atlanta Journal-Constitution reported that the building's future remained uncertain. The following month, another building on Morris Brown's campus experienced a fire, leading to plans for its demolition and prompting comparisons to the situation with Gaines Hall. In December 2016, Curbed Atlanta reported that Gaines Hall was undergoing "demolition by neglect at the hands of the city". By the following year, the building was still vacant and in a state of deterioration, per the Georgia Trust for Historic Preservation. The organization included it, alongside several other Morris Brown buildings, in its 2017 list of "Places in Peril". Additionally, the Atlanta Preservation Center listed the building as "jeopardized".

=== Property lawsuit ===
Following Morris Brown's property sales, Clark Atlanta University initiated legal proceedings against both Friendship Baptist Church and the city government over ownership of the property, asserting that it was the rightful owner based on the 1940 agreement with Morris Brown. In 2016, the Supreme Court of Georgia upheld Clark Atlanta's lawsuit against the city government and, on October 2, 2017, the Georgia Court of Appeals decided that Clark Atlanta should receive 13 acres, including the property upon which Gaines Hall stands, from the city government. Following the decision, Clark Atlanta University's president, Ronald A. Johnson, said he would be discussing future plans for the property with members of the university's board of trustees. According to WSB-TV, city officials were considering challenging the ruling. Concerning future plans for the site at that time, Mayor Reed said that some individuals had approached the city government about using the site for a film studio.

In April 2018, the Supreme Court of Georgia ruled against the city government and ordered the transfer of the property to Clark Atlanta University. By this time, the legal proceedings had been going on for about four years and had cost the city roughly $400,000 ($512,900 in 2025) in legal fees. Additionally, a representative of Clark Atlanta said that they would be seeking $2 million ($2.56 million in 2025) in legal fee reimbursement from the city government and an additional $8 million to $12 million ($10.26 million to $15.39 million in 2025) for repairs to Gaines Hall stemming from the 2015 fire. At the time, the 13-acre property was given a land valuation of $10 million ($13 million in 2025).

=== 2023 and 2024 fires ===
On February 16, 2023, another fire occurred inside the building that spread to all of its floors, causing some sections of the walls, roof, and the second floor to collapse. At the time of the fire, restoration plans were in place, but work on the building, which at this time was owned by Clark Atlanta University, had not yet commenced. Several months later, in December, another fire occurred at the building. By this time, the building was regularly used as residence for homeless people. On June 13, 2024, the building experienced another major fire.

== See also ==
- Wesley John Gaines, a cofounder of Morris Brown College

== Books and journals ==
- Garrett, Franklin M. (Spring 1971). "Atlanta and Environs, Chapter 45 (1867)". The Atlanta Historical Bulletin. XVI (1). Atlanta Historical Society: 68–113. ISSN 0896-3975.
- Gournay, Isabelle (1993). Sams, Gerald W. (ed.). AIA Guide to the Architecture of Atlanta. Photographs by Paul G. Beswick; Foreword by Dana F. White. Athens, Georgia: University of Georgia Press. ISBN 978-0-8203-1439-6. LCCN 92012694. OCLC 25675649.
- Lyon, Elizabeth A. (1986) [1976]. Atlanta Architecture: The Victorian Heritage: 1837-1918. Atlanta: Atlanta Historical Society. OCLC 3375470.
- Sawyer, Elizabeth M.; Matthews, Jane Foster (1976). The Old in New Atlanta: A Directory of Houses, Buildings and Churches Built Prior to 1915 Still Standing in the Mid-1970s in Atlanta and Environs. Photographs by Theodosia C. Moore. Atlanta: JEMS Publications. LCCN 76005245.
