= Peter Whelan (priest) =

Irish-born Catholic priest (1802–1871)

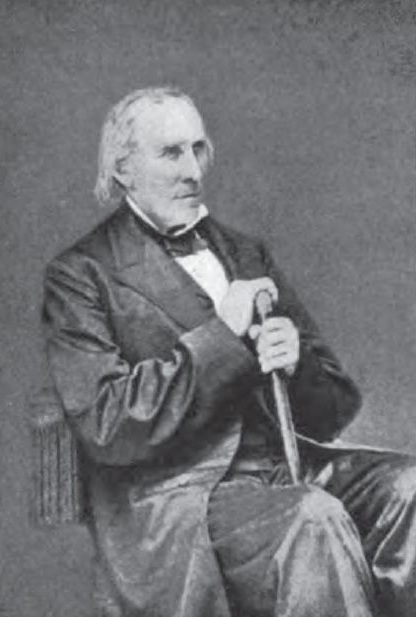
Father Peter Whelan

Father Peter Whelan (1802 – February 6, 1871) was an Irish-born Catholic priest who was a chaplain for both Confederate troops and Union prisoners of war during the American Civil War. Whelan previously served as a missionary in North Carolina and pastor of Georgia's first Catholic parish, and twice served as administrator of the entire Diocese of Savannah.

He initially ministered to Confederate troops including the Montgomery Guards, an Irish company established in Savannah for the First Georgia Volunteer Regiment. He remained with them during the Union siege of Fort Pulaski which guarded Savannah harbor, and volunteered to remain with them during their imprisonment in New York in 1862. About a year after his release in a prisoner exchange, he was assigned to minister to the Union prisoners-of-war held at Andersonville, Georgia, where he became known as the "Angel of Andersonville". According to a biographer in 1959, Father Whelan "never received a lasting place in the history of the Southland he loved so well".

== Early life and ministry ==
Peter Whelan was born in 1802 in Loughnageer, Foulkesmills (parish of Clongeen), County Wexford, Ireland. Little is known about his early life. From 1822 to 1824 he attended St Kieran's College in Kilkenny, where he received a classical and mathematical education before coming to America. Whelan heard about an appeal for priests made by John England, the popular and dynamic bishop of the new Diocese of Charleston, which at the time comprised both Carolinas and Georgia.

Whelan was incardinated on April 6, 1829, and was ordained in Charleston on November 21, 1830. For the next two years he served as secretary to the bishop before beginning his duties in communities throughout North Carolina, including New Bern, Washington, Greenville, Fayetteville, Lincolnton, Salisbury, Wilmington, Long Creek, and Raleigh. He was said to have celebrated the first Mass ever offered in Raleigh, in 1832, at the boarding house of Matthew Shaw, a Presbyterian. His zeal also played a key role in the erection of the capital city's first Catholic church.

Although Whelan occasionally visited Georgia, it was not until February 21, 1837, that he became pastor of the Church of the Purification of the Most Pure Heart of Mary at Locust Grove, near modern-day Sharon, Georgia. He spent nineteen years in this small parish, which was the first planned, Catholic community in the state. Located on an old stagecoach road running from Sparta through Double Wells to Raytown and Washington, the original place of worship, constructed of hand-hewn logs, was also the first Catholic Church built in Georgia. Father Whelan had offered the first Mass in the home of Thomas G. Semmes in the town of Washington in 1835.

At Bishop England's death, Ignatius A. Reynolds was appointed to the position. On a visit to Locust Grove in 1844, he expressed deep satisfaction with the religious proficiency of the children. Two years later another report summed up Whelan's whole pastorate: "In the diocese…there is not a congregation, remote and rural as it is, in which, taking proportionate numbers into the scale, we find the youth are more moral, orderly and better instructed."

== The Diocese of Savannah ==
In 1850 the new Diocese of Savannah, encompassing all of Georgia and part of Florida, was established, and Francis Xavier Gartland became its first bishop. In 1854 Father Gregory Duggan of Augusta became ill during a yellow fever epidemic. Whelan journeyed to Augusta to help handle Duggan's affairs. He was then summoned to Savannah when Bishop Gartland, while ministering to victims of yellow fever, caught the disease himself and died. Father Whelan would be stationed here for the rest of his life.

The young diocese was without a bishop until the Reverend John Barry, the interim administrator, was consecrated in August 1857, and Whelan was appointed his vicar general. However, tragedy struck again in November 1859 when Barry died on a trip to France. Soon, Whelan became administrator of the whole diocese. Although he purportedly had been recommended for the Episcopal dignity, Bishop Patrick Lynch of Charleston and the priests of Savannah had to pressure Whelan to accept the office of administrator until a new bishop could be appointed.

This duty was unusually difficult for Whelan. In a report of January 25, 1861, to the Propagation of the Faith, he indicated that Barry's sudden death had left the diocese in disarray. Distance between missions, lack of good communications, and a scarcity of priests increased the burden. Debt payments were due on various projects, such as the schools and churches so vitally needed for the poor Irish immigrants. One priest visiting Savannah in 1859 said that he witnessed the bishop, priests, and thirty orphans "huddled together in a shanty through which the wind whistled as through a basket".

Relief finally came for Whelan in September 1861, when Bishop Augustin Verot arrived from Florida to fill the vacant See. By then Savannah was caught up in the Civil War. People of all faiths in the South had favored secession. One missionary, who had previously visited Savannah, complained that, "Father Whelan with all the priests tried to make [him] a secessionist." Whelan had even jokingly warned of "tar and feathers".

== Civil War ==
=== Fort Pulaski ===
Fort Pulaski, located on Cockspur Island, about seventeen miles from the city of Savannah was manned by five companies of Confederates, guarded the port of Savannah. Bishop Verot asked for a volunteer priest to go to Fort Pulaski and serve the needs of all the Catholic troops stationed there, especially the Montgomery Guards, composed almost exclusively of Irish Catholics from the surrounding area. The sixty-year-old Father Whelan answered the call. As one of only eleven priests in all Georgia, he had to return occasionally to the city. Bishop Verot, who was about to depart on church matters, placed Whelan in charge of whole diocese on January 7, 1862. Upon the bishop's return four weeks later, the telegraph lines to Cockspur were cut by the Federals, and the fort was isolated. Whelan could not attend the annual clergy retreat or the diocesan synod, nor would he see his Savannah friends again for six months.

The isolation of Fort Pulaski came gradually. The Federals slowly severed it from Savannah as part of their planned blockade of all southern ports. While the encirclement was in progress, the defenders grew troubled. Lack of communication with Savannah added to their tension. As they readied the fort for action, Federal ordnance was being landed in the darkness and stealthily put into place behind sand dunes a mile away.

During this period, the pastoral duties of the Irish chaplain expanded. While he did not participate in military operations, he lived alongside the soldiers and provided support to the hard-pressed, weary soldiers. Whelan soon became well-regarded among the men regardless of their faith, while offering religious direction to the Catholic soldiers.

Organized on August 20, 1861, and quickly mustered into service, the Montgomery Guards was still without its own colors. With some fabric located by Captain Lawrence J. Guilmartin, the Sisters of Mercy in Savannah constructed a handsome banner. On St. Patrick's Day, 1862, after morning Mass, Major John Foley of the garrison formally presented the flag to Private Bernard O'Neill, the appointed standard bearer. Following the custom of Catholic chaplains throughout the war, Whelan called down God's blessing on the banner and the company.

On the morning of Thursday, April 10, 1862, the Federal forces began to bombard the fort. During this period Father Whelan experienced what few chaplains ever faced: direct, heavy fire from the enemy. The new rifled cannons proved to be a most effective advantage for the Union Artillery, providing greater distance and accuracy than that of their Confederate counterpart. For thirty hours the Union batteries pounded the fort. Conical steel-pointed shot soon began to bore through the walls of the brick and mortar fortress. After the crumbling officers' quarters became uninhabitable, the priest had to stay in the northeast casements while tending the wounded. The walls of the fort were receiving serious damage and it was only a matter of time before artillery rounds would penetrate the main powder magazine. In order to preserve the lives of his men, the garrison's commander, Colonel Charles H. Olmstead, agreed to surrender.

=== Castle William ===
On April 13, two days after Fort Pulaski was surrendered, the captured Confederates were divided into groups for transportation north. Father Whelan was offered his freedom but chose to remain with the men in order to continue his ministry among them. Now a prisoner of war, the priest endured the harsh voyage to Governor's Island, New York, where he shared the rigors of prison life with the men. This place of detention, which was under the command of an elderly colonel, Gustavus Loomis, was one of several Atlantic forts pressed into use by the Commissary General of Prisoners, Colonel William Hoffmann.

The officers were quartered in barracks and granted freedom of the island on their word not to escape; they were also issued blankets and limited supplies and money from home. Their quarters were cleaned regularly and meals were cooked for them. The enlisted men, on the other hand, were not so fortunate. Many needed clothing, and some even had to go barefoot. They were confined in an old fort known as "Castle William". It had few toilet facilities, poor ventilation, no conveniences for cooking the meager meals, and inadequate heating. The men soon began to suffer severely from pneumonia, typhoid, and measles.

Whelan's first step to alleviate this situation was to procure food and clothing. On May 3, he wrote to the Reverend William Quinn, pastor of St. Peter Church on Barclay Street in New York. In the letter he indicated that he had received provisions from Baltimore. In a humorous vein, Whelan asked that no more rich food be sent, lest he become an epicure in his later years. He added that he had successfully applied for a position as chaplain at the prison and had been granted the opportunity to offer Mass each morning in Castle William.

Two days later, Fr. Quinn, in the name of all the clergy of New York, requested that Whelan be released on parole and be allowed to live at St. Peter's due to his age and his misfortune in having been captured while temporarily visiting Fort Pulaski. Quinn expressed fear that confinement in the damp, cold prison would seriously injure the priest's health. The appeal achieved its desired effect. On May 10, Loomis sent Whelan to Assistant Provost Marshal Hunt, who brought him before General John A. Dix and Judge Edwards Pierrepont. They discharged the priest and put him on parole. Although he was allowed to leave, Whelan chose instead to remain with the men, who now needed him more than ever.

Except for an occasional trip to the city to procure necessities for the men, Whelan remained at the prison, saying Mass in the morning, visiting the sick, giving encouragement and spiritual guidance for those in need, help for new prisoners when they arrived, and making burial arrangements for the deceased.

While at Castle William, he became accustomed to taking walks on the ramparts early each morning. There he often met the Confederate officers. It was through these encounters that he and Colonel Charles Olmstead became very close.

On June 16, the sick and wounded that had been left at Pulaski, after its capture, now arrived. Although it had been agreed upon in the surrender terms that these men would be transported to Savannah for care, General David Hunter now refused this request. General Quincy Gillmore, the original author of the surrender, was embarrassed and protested, but to no avail. When they arrived, the men looked like skeletons, and immediately Father Whelan had more clothing and food rushed from New York.

On June 20, 1862, a prisoner exchange was arranged. The officers were sent to Ohio and were home by September. The others had to wait until July 10 before leaving for Fort Delaware. The sick were temporarily left behind.

Pea Patch Island, the site of this recently completed fort was marshy, easily flooded, and malarial. The Georgians were quartered in tents on swampy ground filled with ditches and shoals. A few had to stay in the open without cover, because an insufficient number of wooden barracks had been constructed. The poor men soon named the place "Starvation Island". Whether Whelan came at this time with his company or stayed behind with the sick until July 26 is not known, but he did, in fact, spend time with the men at Fort Delaware, which left a lasting impression upon him.

After about four weeks, word came for the Confederate prisoners to prepare to embark for Fort Monroe, Virginia, on July 31. They were then to proceed up the James River on shallow draft boats and finally go to Aiken's Landing for exchange. They could walk the last thirteen miles to Richmond. The ill would be transported to the City Point and taken by rail to the capital. All went as planned. The prisoners were on the James River by August 3 and knew they would soon be heading home. Whelan arrived at City Point with the sick and on August 8 was unconditionally released. He then went to Aiken's Landing to join those of his company who were being exchanged on August 12.

Despite numerous searches in the course of his travels, the flag of the Montgomery Guards had been faithfully concealed by the color-bearer, Bernard O'Neill. As the exchange drew near, some prisoners, including O'Neill, decided to take the oath of allegiance to the Union rather than return to Georgia. Six other members of the Irish Company resolved to recover the banner quickly beforehand. On the night before O'Neill's departure, the men stole into his quarters as he slept and retrieved the banner. While passing through the lines at Aiken's, one of the Confederates improvised a staff and triumphantly hoisted the unfurled flag amid the loud cheers of the whole company. The flag survived the war. Years later, when it was exhibited at the Georgia Historical Society, a picture of Whelan was displayed with it in the corner of the case.

Before returning to Georgia, the chaplain visited Mount Hope Hospital near Baltimore to thank the Sisters of Charity for their gifts to the imprisoned soldiers.

=== Return to Savannah ===
Upon his return to Savannah, Whelan resumed his post as Vicar General. In addition, Bishop Verot assigned him the task of overseeing the religious needs of the Confederate military posts in Georgia. As the spring of 1864 arrived, the Federal army was preparing to invade Georgia. Consequently, in addition to his regular round of work at the cathedral, Whelan had to supervise the religious needs of the many new Confederate camps in the diocese.

The Reverend James Sheeran of the Fourteenth Louisiana, gives a portrait of Whelan at this time:

[He] stands nearly six feet with drab hair, coarse, ill shaped countenance, round or swinging shoulders, long arms, short body and long legs, with feet of more than ordinary size. He may comb his hair sometimes, but if so, it shows no indication of it, as it is generally in a standing condition. His coat is not of the latest nor approved fashion: the sleeves exposing some inches of the lower part of his arm, and a large rough hand. His pants extend only a little below the knees, exhibiting a considerable portion of his stockings and unpolished or ash-colored shoes... He is fully sensible of his personal exterior. One day he met a brother priest, to whom nature was no more liberal than to himself. "Well," said he, "...your mother and mine must have been women of great virtue...because they did not drown us when they first saw us. None but mothers of great...patience would have raised such ugly specimens of humanity."

=== Andersonville Prison ===
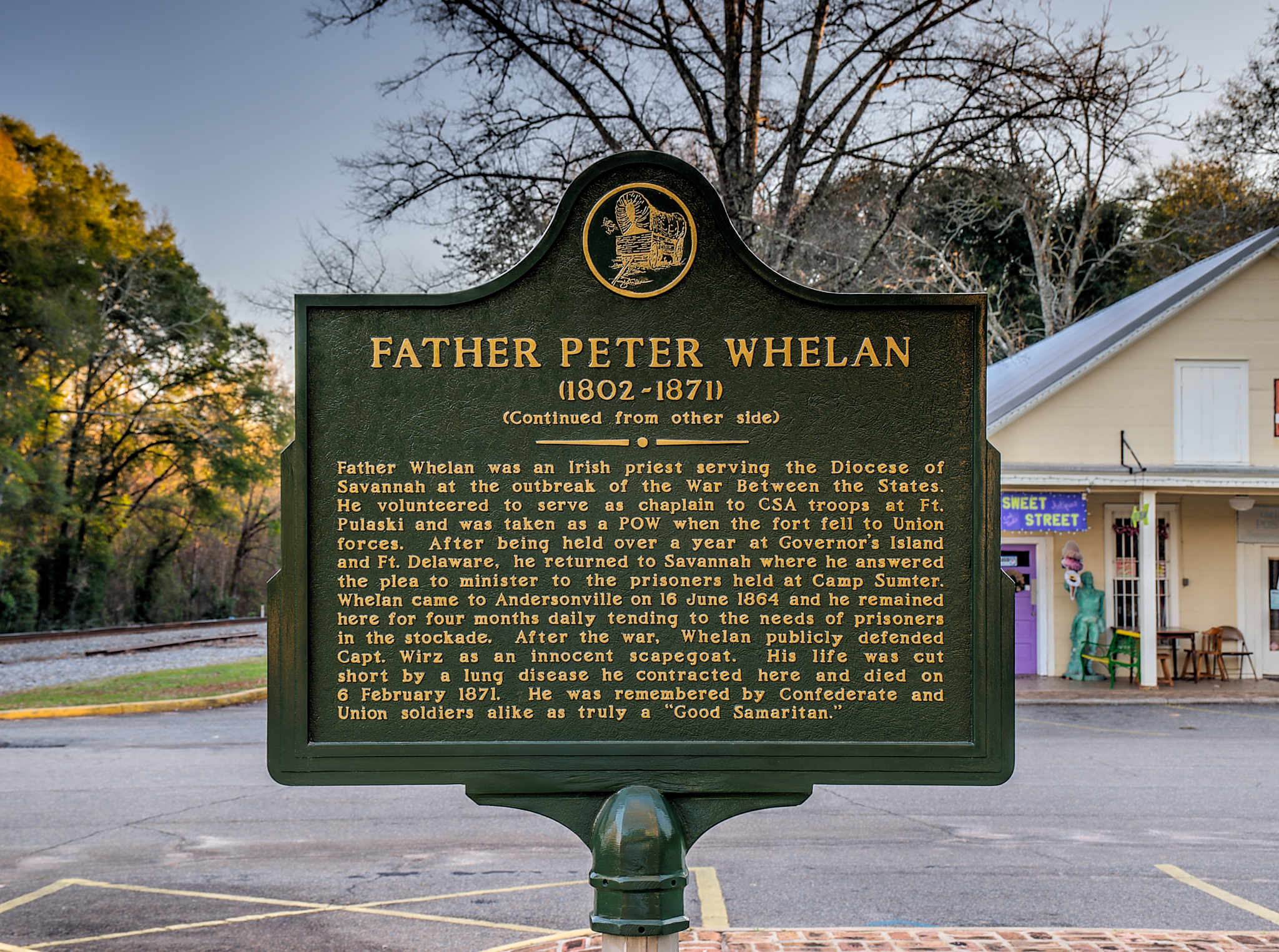
Historic marker for Whelan in Andersonville, GA

In May 1864, the Reverend William Hamilton, pastor of Assumption Church in Macon and the man responsible for the Catholic missions in southwestern Georgia, was visiting Americus, Georgia. He accidentally came upon Andersonville prison, which was officially known as "Camp Sumter," and stopped to learn how many Catholics were there. What he saw led him to write a report to the bishop about the condition of the stockade and hospital and to suggest that a priest be provided immediately. Bishop Verot asked Whelan to go. Before departing, the sixty-two-year-old priest, along with Father Hamilton visited Major General Howell Cobb, a Georgian with close ties to the Confederate administration. Hamilton described the terrible conditions that he had seen and recommended that a parole be arranged for the prisoners. Cobb promised to inform the authorities in Richmond, but, as he had feared, nothing was done to help.

Whelan arrived at Andersonville on June 16, 1864. While other priests and even the bishop would come for brief periods, Whelan alone remained for nearly four months during the hottest season of the year and the period of the highest mortality. He departed in October after many of the prisoners had been removed to other locations.

Although the priest did not leave a record of the shock of his first entry into Andersonville, Father Hamilton described his impressions of subsequent visits vividly:

I found the stockade extremely filthy; the men all huddled together and covered with vermin (lice).… I found [the hospital] almost as crowded as the stockade. The men were dying there very rapidly from scurvy…diarrhea and dysentery…They were not only covered with the ordinary vermin but also maggots…they had nothing under them at all except the ground.

Into this nightmare came Whelan to begin a ministry unlike any that he had performed or would ever encounter again. After a restless night on his bunk in a little twelve-by-eight foot hut about a mile from the prison, he rose each day at dawn, took a scant breakfast and said his prayers. Then he walked the hot, dusty path to the stockade, where he stayed from 9 a.m. until nearly sundown; then it was back to the hut for night prayer and some food. He fell asleep exhausted and "full of sorrow for what he had seen all day".

The stockade sloped down on both sides to a small stream about a yard wide and foot deep. Since no arrangement had been made for sewage disposal, this one creek had to provide drinking, cooking, and bathing water, while also serving as the latrine. Into the creek was thrown the waste of two nearby Confederate camps as well as the grease and garbage from the cookhouse. Soon the slow-flowing stream became a mass of thick, liquid pollution. As thousands more prisoners came and milled about its banks, some of the very sick were unable to extricate themselves from the mire; others who could not reach the "sinks," as they were called, had to relieve themselves in the mud. The creek soon became a new source of disease for the entire stockade. Father Whelan and his fellow priests had to exert an almost "superhuman effort" passing through this area in order to get from one side of the camp to the other.

All this was too much for Father Henry Clavreul, who had joined Whelan in August. He became sick with continual vomiting and later wrote: "Whelan decided that I should leave, so I took the trains back to Savannah whilst the…old priest retraced his steps to the stockade." As the number of prisoners grew steadily to about 33,000, Whelan requested more help. He was joined first by the Reverend John Kirby of Augusta, and then, by the multilingual Jesuit, the Reverend Anselm Usannez, from Spring Hill College near Mobile. Each worked for two weeks before leaving the camp.

==== Trial of the Raiders ====
The lack of streets and the hodgepodge of dwellings in the stockade made it impossible to police the area properly. Stealing, brutality, and even murder by well-organized armed "raiders" became common. After many protests the prisoners were allowed to organize for defense, to have the suspects arrested, and to give them a fair trial. Twenty-four were caught, tried and convicted, and six were sentenced to death. Whelan visited the men in the stocks on July 10, the night before their execution. The next morning, as the scaffold was being constructed, the priest tried in vain to obtain a stay of execution.

==== "Whelan's Bread" ====
In late August, as Sherman was about to enter Atlanta, Union prisoners were being transferred to Savannah and Charleston. By late September, Whelan decided that he could leave. Before he left, the priest contacted Henry Horne, a devout Catholic and successful restaurant owner in Macon. From him Whelan borrowed $16,000 in Confederate money, the equivalent of $400 in gold. With this, he went to the town of Americus, purchased ten thousand pounds of wheat flour, had it baked into bread and distributed at the prison hospital at Andersonville. The prisoners referred to it as "Whelan's bread". This much-needed gift was enough to provide the men with rations for several months.

==== "The Angel of Andersonville" ====
The prisoners never forgot the priest. When they returned home and wrote their memoirs, Father Whelan and his work were often recalled. Some mentioned that he had brought clothing, food, and money from Savannah. One added, "without a doubt he was the means of saving hundred of lives". Another described Whelan's ministering to the sick: "All creeds, color and nationalities were alike to him…He was indeed the Good Samaritan." A sergeant, John Vaughter, in his memoirs remarked that, "of all the ministers in Georgia accessible to Andersonville, only one could hear this sentence, 'I was sick and in prison and you visited me,' and that one is a Catholic."

=== Back In Savannah ===
When the elderly priest returned to Savannah he faced internal and external changes. He was then suffering from a lung ailment he contracted at Andersonville. In Savannah, despondency was everywhere. Many families had lost loved ones, and the end of the Confederacy seemed close at hand. Federal prisoners, by the thousands, began arriving in the city and were in need of care.

Whelan was still Vicar General when Sherman's forces arrived in December. Immediately east of Savannah's Catholic cemetery on the Thunderbolt Road, the federal engineers began reconstruction of the old Confederate earthworks. While digging the new trenches, they invaded the cemetery, opened some graves, and destroyed or covered up some monuments. Among the graves that were disturbed was that of the first bishop of Savannah, Francis Gartland. To prevent desecration, some women removed his remains and buried them temporarily in the convent garden of the Sisters of Mercy. The bodies of another bishop, two priests, and four nuns were also rescued.

Whelan was the first to protest with a letter to General Quincy Gillmore, whom he had known at Fort Pulaski: "It must be…an extreme military necessity when the ashes of the dead are disturbed…. Might can effect it, but does Right sanction it?" His appeal for the situation to be corrected was followed with messages from Bishop Verot to Gillmore and Secretary of War, Edwin Stanton. Investigations took place, more letters were exchanged, and eventually the matter was resolved.

== Post-war ==
=== Trial of Henry Wirz ===
As Federal ex-prisoners were gradually returning to their homes in the North. The details of the horrors of Andersonville quickly circulated, and the leaders of the Confederacy came under fire. Since General Winder, the commandant, was dead, the cry for expiation began to focus on Captain Wirz, who had been in charge of affairs within the stockade. On May 7, 1865, the accused was arrested and brought to Washington, where a military tribunal placed him on trial, convicted and sentenced him to death. Among the 160 witnesses summoned to testify were Fathers Hamilton and Whelan.

Hamilton described conditions in the prison, but both priests said that Wirz had even seemed anxious to have their services. He had received them with kindness and had always given them the necessary passes without restrictions. They testified under oath that, although Wirz used profane language and occasionally spoke harshly to some of the prisoners, they had not seen him inflict any personal harm that caused death, nor had they heard of such injury. Whelan added that it was highly probable that during his four months there he would have heard of any violence had it occurred.

It seems that Whelan regarded Wirz as merely a symbolic scapegoat, made to pay for all the suffering endured by the citizens and soldiers of the North during the war. During the trial, Wirz, a Catholic, asked that Hamilton and Whelan be allowed to visit him. When they saw his broken condition, they appealed, unsuccessfully, that he be granted a few days rest from the harsh trial, which had already dragged on for more than two months. In spite of their positive testimony, along with that of many ex-prisoners, Captain Wirz was executed by hanging. He was the only officer in the Civil War executed for war crimes.

== Final days ==
On March 10, 1866, Whelan became ill with a severe attack of "congestion of the lungs." Before this outbreak he had written to Secretary of War, Edwin Stanton, asking for $400 to pay back his loan from Henry Horne to procure bread for the Federal prisoners. Horne, who was very sick himself, needed the money. Stanton replied late in October, asking for sworn vouchers and bills of purchase for the wheat flour. The priest told Stanton to keep the money because he had, "neither the health nor the strength ...to run over Georgia to hunt up vouchers and bills of purchase." Unable to make any headway, the priest informed the Secretary that the "good God" had provided him with another way to repay this debt. Because of his worsening lung condition, his doctors had recommended that he go north to escape the humid air. His friends in Savannah provided him with the necessary funds in order to make the trip to New York. Instead, the priest informed Stanton that, preferring justice to health, he used the money he had been given to refund Mr. Horne.

When his health improved slightly, Whelan became pastor of St. Patrick's in Savannah and served there until 1868. He was never his former self, however. The cathedral register in Savannah shows that Whelan administered his last baptism on January 15, 1871. Two weeks later he took a bad turn, and his imminent death was announced. The priest received the sacraments, and died a little after five o'clock on the evening of Monday, February 6, 1871, at the age of sixty-nine.

== Funeral ==
The Savannah Evening News described the funeral procession four days later as the longest ever seen in the city and added that seldom was so large a gathering of people found in the streets of Savannah. The Mass began at 10 a.m. where Whelan's body rested in a splendid iron casket, ornamented with full-size silver roses. A wreath of laurel, emblematic of his devotion to the South, was placed at the coffin's head.

Eighty-six carriages and buggies escorted the body through the crowded avenues to the Catholic cemetery. People from all over the city turned out to bid farewell to this beloved priest, including many non-Catholics. Colonel Olmstead led members from the old garrison, followed by various religious societies and Irish organization.

== Sources ==
- Rev. Peter J. Meaney, "The Prison Ministry of Father Peter Whelan, Georgia Priest and Confederate Chaplain." Georgia Historical Quarterly 71 (1987): 1-24.
