= William H. Parkins =

American architect (1836–1894)

William Henry Parkins
- Parkins, c. 1885
- Born: June 1, 1836; Nassau, New York, United States
- Died: January 29, 1894 (aged 57); Calhoun County, Georgia, United States
- Occupation: Architect
- Buildings: Kimball House; Shrine of the Immaculate Conception

William Henry Parkins (June 1, 1836 – January 29, 1894) was an American architect best known for his work in Atlanta during the late 1800s.

Born in New York in 1836, Parkins moved to South Carolina in the Antebellum era and was a Union sympathizer during the American Civil War. He spent over a year trying to travel across the South to make it back to his home state, and his journey was later adapted into a novel by noted author Archibald Clavering Gunter. Following the war, he moved to Atlanta and was the first and, for a time, only architect in the city. He received commissions for several major projects in the city and surrounding area, primarily for religious buildings, and some of his most notable works include the Shrine of the Immaculate Conception and the Kimball House. Later in his career, he formed a partnership with Alexander Campbell Bruce and hired Thomas Henry Morgan as a drafter. Following his retirement in 1882, the two of them formed the architectural firm of Bruce & Morgan, which designed many academic buildings in the region. Parkins retired to a farm in Calhoun County, Georgia, and died in 1894. A 2013 article in the New Georgia Encyclopedia calls him "the most significant architect practicing in Georgia in the immediate decades following the Civil War".

== Biography ==
=== American Civil War ===
Parkins was born in New York in 1836. By the 1850s, he had relocated to Columbia, South Carolina, where he lived with his wife Emma Palmer, a native of the city, and his infant son Frank. The family was living here when South Carolina seceded from the United States, precipitating the American Civil War. While he had been living in the American South for several years, he was sympathetic to the Union, and after talking with his family, he decided to travel back to his family's home in New York, with Emma and Frank joining him afterwards. However, his journey from South Carolina to New York would ultimately take him over eighteen months. Parkins's journey began by rail from Columbia to Charlotte, North Carolina, and then by stagecoach to Murfreesboro, North Carolina. After crossing the Chowan River, he continued traveling on foot until being arrested by Confederate soldiers near Suffolk, Virginia. He was delivered to General Henry L. Benning, who, despite calls from some soldiers to hang him as a Union spy, instead ordered him sent to General James Longstreet's headquarters. Prior to this, however, he was interrogated by General George Pickett. The next day, Pickens and other prisoners were sent to Castle Thunder, a prison that was under the command of General John H. Winder. After six weeks in the prison, Winder had determined he was not a spy and he was sent back to Columbia, where he was allowed to spend one free day with his family before having to enlist in the Confederate States Army as a conscript. He was first stationed at a military camp on the plantation of General Wade Hampton III, where he became a corporal and was involved in construction activities.

Following the Union victory in the Siege of Vicksburg in July 1863, Parkins decided to renew his efforts to get to the North. He was granted a furlough by his superior to go to North Carolina for several days, during which time he found work at the rail yard in Graham, though his request for a permanent transfer was denied and he returned to Columbia. After a few weeks in Columbia, he received a letter from a friend and fellow Union sympathizer in Graham that said he would help him escape if he could return to the city. Parkins departed to Charlotte and then to Graham, making sure not to arouse suspicion or draw the attention of authorities, and once in Graham he again found work in the rail yard. While there, Emma visited him to tell him that Confederate soldiers had searched their house for him, and following the visit, he decided to try to escape into Union-held territory via Knoxville, Tennessee. Parkins was joined on his journey by some other workers from the rail yard, with the group planning to make the 400 miles (640 km) trip by hiding out during the day and moving at night. The group made it past Wilkesboro, North Carolina, before they were found by Confederate Home Guards who imprisoned Parkins in a nearby house. However, unbeknownst to the Confederates, the house belonged to a Union sympathizer who helped Parkins escape. Parkins then traveled alone for some time before meeting two Union cavalry officers who had escaped from the Confederate prisoner of war (POW) camp in Salisbury, North Carolina, with the men deciding to travel together back to Union lines. By this point, Parkins had been attempting to leave the South for over a year. As they continued traveling, they were joined by other Union POW escapees and Confederate deserters, with the group calling themselves the "Union Jacks of the Blue Ridge". At one point during their travels, this group became involved in a shootout with guerrilla soldiers under General John Hunt Morgan's command, with the soldiers retreating from the skirmish. Eventually, the group reached the Nolichucky River and were able to cross it despite being shot at by soldiers under Longstreet's command. After the crossing, the group made it to the Union frontlines.

While Union officials were initially skeptical of the group, Parkins was able to convince them of his loyalty by showing them a letter from his father, who lived in Champaign, Illinois. The group was then transported to Nashville, Tennessee, before being taken by steamship to Louisville, Kentucky, via the Cumberland and Ohio Rivers. Here, the group split up, with Parkins working for some time in New Albany, Indiana, before making enough money to travel to Champaign, where he met up with his parents. He stayed here for some time and worked with his father before moving to New York. By this time, the war had ended and Emma and Frank were able to travel to New York to be with William. Parkins's accounts of his journey would later be adapted into the 1889 novel How I Escaped, written by noted New York City-based author Archibald Clavering Gunter. Additionally, the Atlanta History Center has a 430-page holograph by him telling of his activities during the Civil War.

=== Career in Atlanta ===
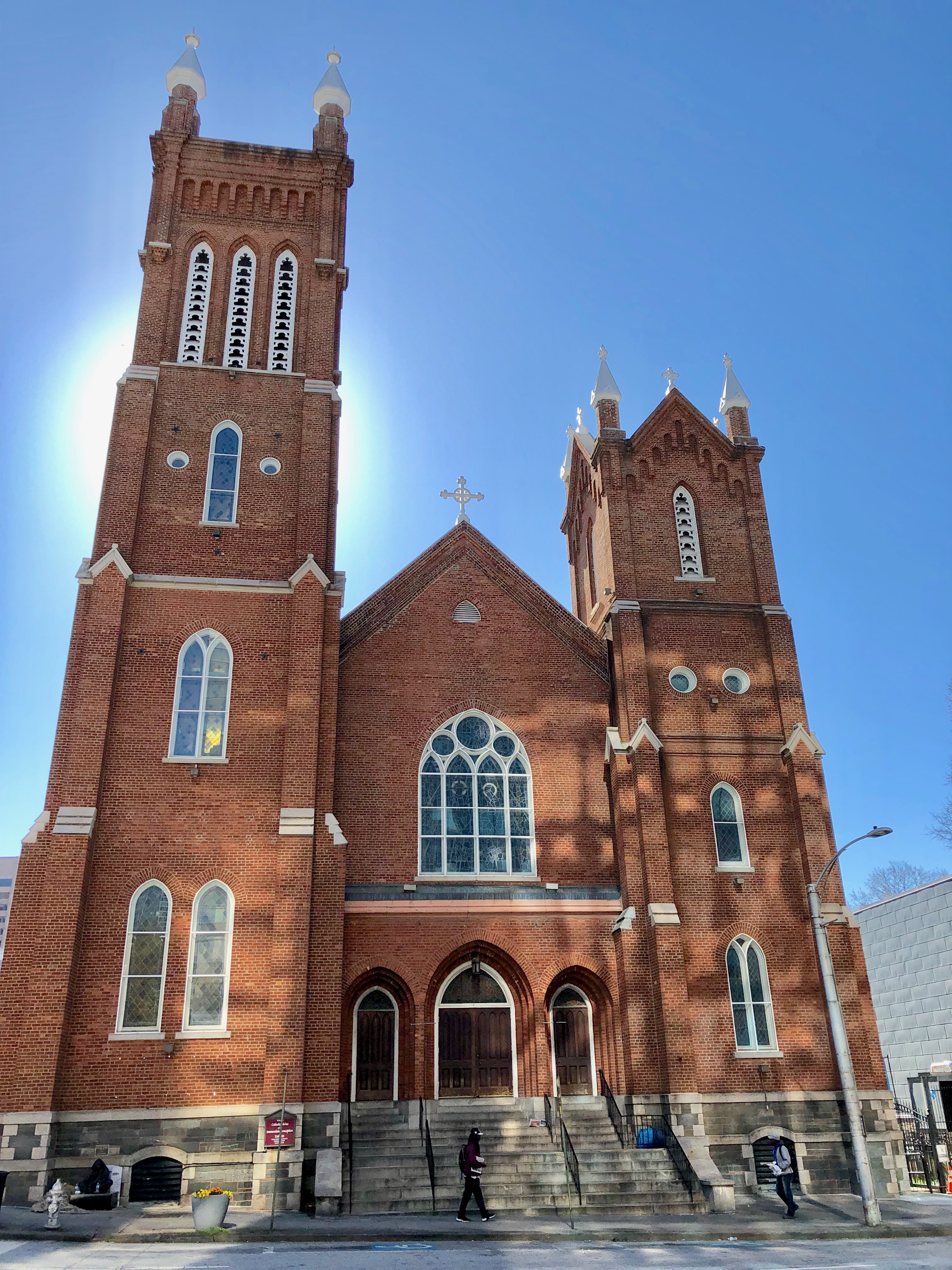
The Shrine of the Immaculate Conception

In early 1868, Parkins and his family moved to Atlanta, Georgia, where he would practice architecture. The city had been heavily damaged during the Civil War with the 1864 Battle of Atlanta, but the city was rebuilding and growing into a regional economic powerhouse. Parkins became the first practicing architect to operate in the city. Around this time, his offices were located above the Georgia National Bank, and in addition to architecture, he also offered an interior decorating service. Parkins quickly became a prominent citizen in Atlanta. He was a leading member of the group that established the first library system in the city, a predecessor to the Atlanta–Fulton Public Library System. Additionally, Parkins was the organist for St. Philip's Episcopal Church and was the founder and first president of the "Beethoven Society", a social club for musicians.

One of the first projects Parkins worked on in Atlanta was designing the Catholic Church of the Immaculate Conception in downtown Atlanta. The original church building at the site had been constructed in 1848 and had been one of the few structures in the city not destroyed by Union soldiers under General William Tecumseh Sherman during the war. Despite being saved from destruction, the building was still severely damaged, leading church officials to construct a new building designed by Parkins. The Reverend Abram Joseph Ryan laid the cornerstone on September 1, 1869. The building was completed and dedicated in 1873. The building is an example of Gothic Revival architecture, with the design heavily influenced by French Gotchic and High Victorian Gothic styles. The building would later be rededicated as a shrine in 1954. During his early career, Parkins would design several other churches, including First Methodist and Second Baptist, though all of these buildings except for the Shrine of the Immaculate Conception have since been demolished. Both the Catholic and Methodist church were designed in the Gothic Revival style and helped cement Parkins as one of the leading architects in the state. In the late 1860s, he also designed an opera house on Marietta Street. In 1868, the building was sold by businessman Hannibal Kimball to the state government, who used it as a capitol building until the Georgia State Capitol was completed in 1889.

During this time, many of his works were in the Italianate or Second Empire styles. In 1869, he designed North Hall for Atlanta University, a historically black university. The building, later known as Gaines Hall and owned by Morris Brown College, was an Italianate academic building with High Victorian details. In a 2016 article in The Atlanta Journal-Constitution, history professor Tim Crimmins of Georgia State University called the building "the city's most important historic landmark" for its role in African American education in the Reconstruction era. That same year, he designed a mansion for businessman John H. James. This house later served as the Georgia Governor's Mansion. Other examples of Parkins's Italianate features are the original Fulton County Courthouse and the Hancock County Courthouse, which both sported Italianate details such as Mansard roofs.

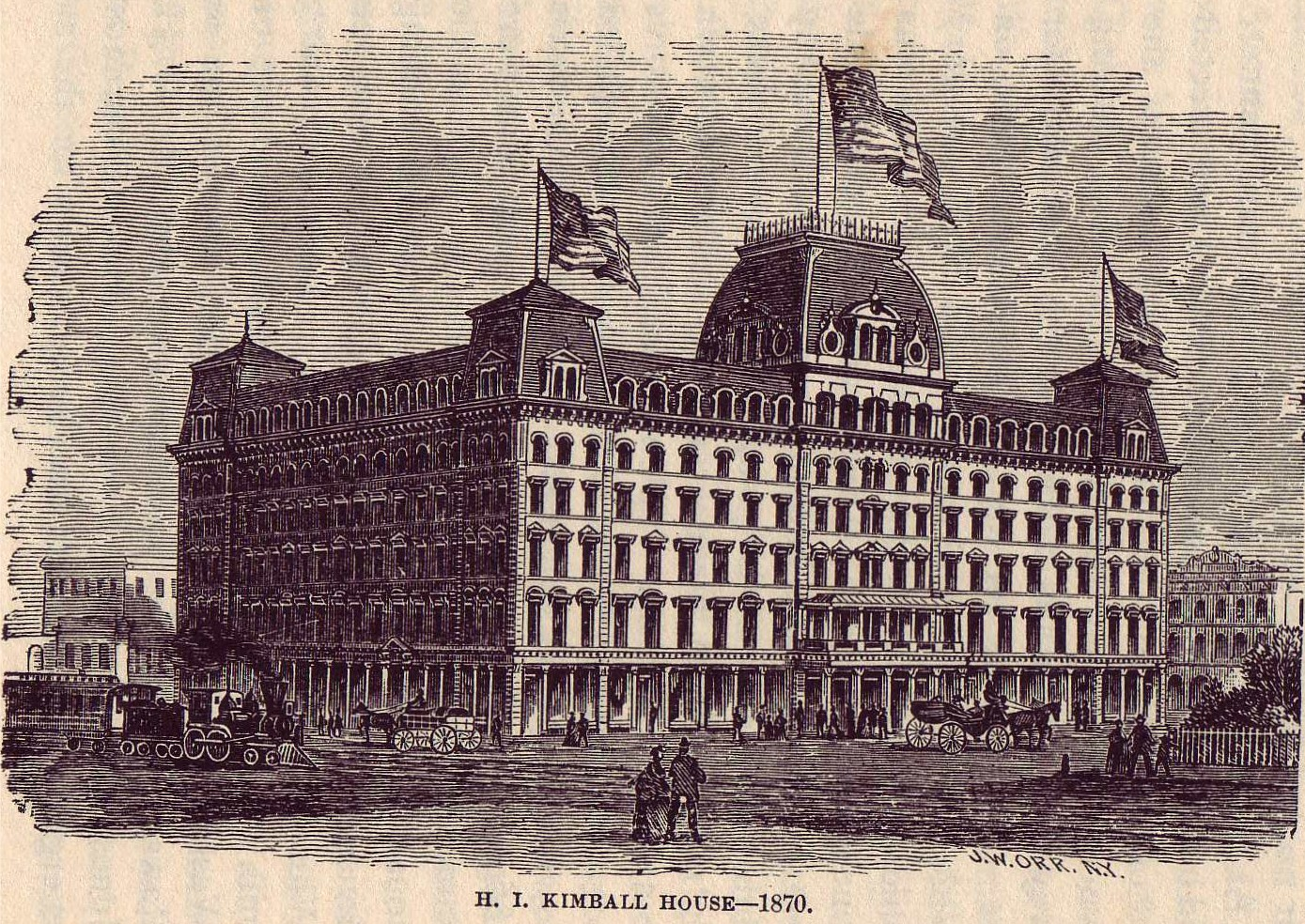
The original Kimball House

In 1870, Parkins was hired by Kimball to design a six-story hotel for the city, the Kimball House. The construction of the building, an elaborate hotel that sported a Mansard roof and several ornamental towers, was covered on the front page of The Atlanta Constitution, with the newspaper calling the design the "highest style of improved modern architecture". Following its construction, Parkins moved his offices into the building. The building burned down in 1883, but was rebuilt under Parkins's supervision, though this later building was eventually demolished in 1959.

In the early 1870s, a man named J. Warner moved to Atlanta and entered into a partnership with Parkins that lasted for several years, and in 1878 Parkins moved his offices into a three-story building at Five Points. The following year, Parkins established a partnership with Alexander Campbell Bruce that would last into the 1880s. The firm, known as Parkins & Bruce, was established in January of that year, with Bruce moving to Atlanta from Knoxville that March. At the time, Bruce was the only member of the American Institute of Architects living in Atlanta. In May, they hired Thomas Henry Morgan as an assistant for the firm. He worked for them as a drafter and at the time was the only architectural drafter in the city.

In 1882, Parkins retired and moved to a farm in Calhoun County. Following this, Morgan and Bruce became partners, and their new firm, named Bruce & Morgan, would go on to design many academic buildings in the region. Parkins died in 1894 and was buried in Atlanta's Oakland Cemetery.

== Notable works ==
- First Methodist Episcopal Church, South (1870), Atlanta, Georgia.
- Fulton County Courthouse (1882), Atlanta, Georgia. (1881-1882)
- John H. James mansion, Atlanta, Georgia.
- Kimball House, Atlanta, Georgia.
- North Hall at Atlanta University (now Gaines Hall at Morris Brown College), Atlanta, Georgia.
- Second Baptist Church, Atlanta, Georgia.
- Second Methodist Episcopal Church, South, Atlanta, Georgia.
- Shrine of the Immaculate Conception, Atlanta, Georgia.
- Old Main at Andrew College, Cuthbert, Georgia.
- Randolph County Courthouse, Cuthbert, Georgia.
- Terrell County Courthouse, Dawson, Georgia.
- Remodeling work for some buildings at Wesleyan College, Macon, Georgia.
- Hancock County Courthouse, Sparta, Georgia.
- Dooly County Courthouse, Vienna, Georgia.

== Sources ==
- "Thomas Henry Morgan". The Atlanta Historical Bulletin. VII (28). Atlanta Historical Society: 87–88. September 1943.
- "Guide to the Atlanta Historical Society Library/Archives Civil War Manuscript, Photograph, and Printed Collections". Atlanta History: A Journal of Georgia and the South. XXXIII (2). Atlanta Historical Society: 84–89. Summer 1989.
- Byrne, Ann D.; White, Dana F. (Summer–Fall 1982). "Atlanta University's "Northeast Lot": Community Building for Black Atlanta's "Talented Tenth"". The Atlanta Historical Journal. XXVI (2–3). Atlanta Historical Society: 155–176.
- Craig, Robert Michael (2012). The Architecture of Francis Palmer Smith, Atlanta's Scholar-Architect. Athens, Georgia: University of Georgia Press. ISBN 978-0-8203-2898-0.
- Deal, Sandra D.; Dickey, Jennifer W.; Lewis, Catherine M. (2015). Memories of the Mansion: The Story of Georgia's Governor's Mansion. Athens, Georgia: University of Georgia Press. ISBN 978-0-8203-4859-9.
- Funderburke, Richard D. (July 17, 2013) [July 30, 2002]. "William H. Parkins". New Georgia Encyclopedia. Archived from the original on October 30, 2021.
- Garrett, Franklin M. (1969). Atlanta and Environs: A Chronicle of Its People and Events, 1820s–1870s. Vol. I. Athens, Georgia: University of Georgia Press. ISBN 978-0-8203-3903-0.
- Garrett, Franklin M. (Spring 1988). "Note and Document: Historic Oakland Cemetery, a Tangible Link to Atlanta's Past". Atlanta History: A Journal of Georgia and the South. XXXII (1). Atlanta Historical Society: 42–62.
- Gournay, Isabelle (1993). Sams, Gerald W. (ed.). AIA Guide to the Architecture of Atlanta. Foreword by Dana F. White. Athens, Georgia: University of Georgia Press. ISBN 978-0-8203-1439-6.
- Holman, Curt (March 4, 2016). "How well do you know Atlanta's historically black neighborhoods?". The Atlanta Journal-Constitution. Cox Enterprises. ISSN 1539-7459. Archived from the original on July 15, 2022.
- King, Spencer Bidwell Jr. (June 1969). "A Yankee Who Served the South". The Atlanta Historical Bulletin. XIV (2). Atlanta Historical Society: 7–30.
- King, Spencer Bidwell Jr. (Winter 1970). "Atlanta's Early Builders". The Atlanta Historical Bulletin. XV (4). Atlanta Historical Society: 88–96.
- Morgan, Thomas H. (June 1937). "Reminiscences of the Architecture and Architects of Atlanta". The Atlanta Historical Bulletin. II (10). Atlanta Historical Society: 5–13.
- Morgan, Thomas H. (September 1943). "The Georgia Chapter of the American Institute of Architects". The Atlanta Historical Bulletin. VII (28). Atlanta Historical Society: 89–163.
- Patrick, James (1981). Architecture in Tennessee, 1768–1897. Knoxville, Tennessee: University of Tennessee Press. ISBN 978-0-87049-631-8.
- Wilson, John Stainback (1871). Atlanta as it is: Being a Brief Sketch of Its Early Settlers. New York City: Little, Rennie & Co.
