= Wallace Putnam Reed =

Wallace Putnam Reed (1849–1903) was an American historian (sometimes referred to as "one of Atlanta's first historians") and journalist active in Georgia, in the post-Civil War period.

== Biography and career ==
Reed was born in 1849 in Rockdale County, Georgia, according to some sources although others have him as coming from Alabama, including Mildred Lewis Rutherford and possibly Joel Chandler Harris, if Harris, "his inseparable friend and editorial associate" at the Atlanta Constitution, indeed wrote Reed's entry in the Memoirs of Georgia.

His biography in Memoirs of Georgia claims he was born in Wilcox County, Alabama, and grew up in Montgomery; he moved to Atlanta with his parents in 1859. The Civil War was an interruption to his education, and he spent two years working in a bookstore. He published his first story at age 15, and throughout his life wrote hundreds of stories and sketches. He passed the bar before he turned 21 and briefly worked as a solicitor. He turned to journalism, first editing two country newspapers, and worked for a variety of papers in and around Atlanta as well as some national newspapers.

Reed was the editor of History of Atlanta, Georgia (D. Mason & Co., 1889), a book considered a building block for Franklin Garrett's authoritative history of the city. He was a colleague of Joel Chandler Harris at the Atlanta Constitution, where he worked since 1883. Reed wrote short stories as well.

Reed's wife was Kate Shaver, the daughter of the Reverend David Shaver. David Shaver was a Baptist preacher, born in Virginia around 1815 and married there at Lynchburg, who moved to Atlanta with his family in 1867, his wife dying in Augusta in 1893. Shaver was the editor of the Atlanta Christian Index for over 28 years. Reed's brother-in-law, Addison Hill Shaver son of David, was born in Hampton, Virginia, went to Mercer University, and became a newspaperman in 1876; working for many newspapers including the Atlanta Constitution and, after marrying Lula McCord in 1890, becoming the editor and proprietor of the Dalton Argus (serving Dalton and the surrounding Whitfield County) in 1892.

Reed died in 1903.
