= Fountain Hall =

- Stone Hall, Atlanta University
- U.S. National Register of Historic Places
- U.S. National Historic Landmark
- Atlanta Landmark Building
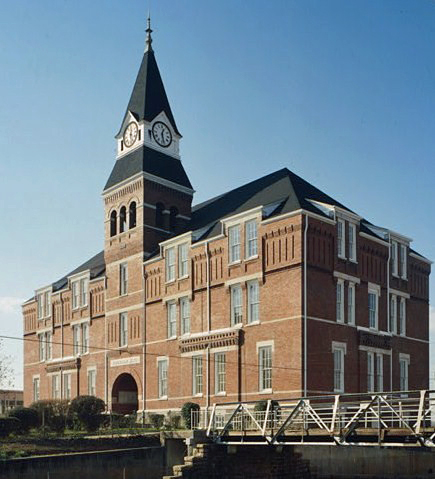
- Fountain Hall in 1979

- Location within Atlanta Location within Georgia Location within the United States
- Location: Morris Brown College campus, Atlanta, Georgia
- Coordinates: 33°45′16″N 84°24′31″W
- Built: 1882
- NRHP reference No.: 74000680

Significant dates
- Added to NRHP: December 2, 1974
- Designated NHL: December 2, 1974
- Designated ALB: October 14, 1989

Fountain Hall, formerly Fairchild Hall and Stone Hall, is a historic academic building on the grounds of Morris Brown College in Atlanta, Georgia. Built in 1882, it is the oldest surviving building originally associated with Atlanta University—now Clark Atlanta University—which is the first of all historically black colleges and universities in the American South founded September 19, 1865. It was declared a National Historic Landmark in 1974. It is now named after Bishop William A. Fountain.

== Description ==
Fountain Hall is located southwest of downtown Atlanta, in the Atlanta University Center area, on the campus of Morris Brown College. It is set on the south side of Martin Luther King, Jr., Boulevard SW, between Sunset Avenue and Vine Street. The building is a 3 1/2-story masonry structure, built out of red brick. It is capped by a hip roof, and has a five-story tower rising above its recessed entrance. The building was designed by the Swedish-American architect G. L. Norrman in the High Victorian Gothic style.

== History ==
Fountain Hall, originally known as Stone Hall, was constructed in 1882 and until 1929 served as the main building for Atlanta University.

From 1897 to 1910, Dr. W.E.B. Du Bois, then a member of the faculty of Atlanta University, had his office located in the building.

In 1929–30, Atlanta University began offering graduate education exclusively in various liberal arts areas, and in the social and natural forensics and ceased undergraduate education.

As Atlanta University had moved to its new campus, Stone Hall was in 1929 deeded to Morris Brown College, which renamed it first to Fairchild Hall and then Fountain Hall.

=== Restoration campaign ===
In 2019, the Atlanta chapter of the Association for the Study of African American Life and History started a "Friends of Fountain" financial campaign to stabilize and preserve Fountain Hall, with the intention of eventually renovating the space as "an academic building and Civil Rights interpretive gallery."

In July 2019, the National Park Service awarded the college $500,000 to help restore the building.

== See also ==
- Gaines Hall
- List of National Historic Landmarks in Georgia (U.S. state)
- National Register of Historic Places listings in Fulton County, Georgia
