= Atlanta First United Methodist Church =

Historic church in Georgia, United States

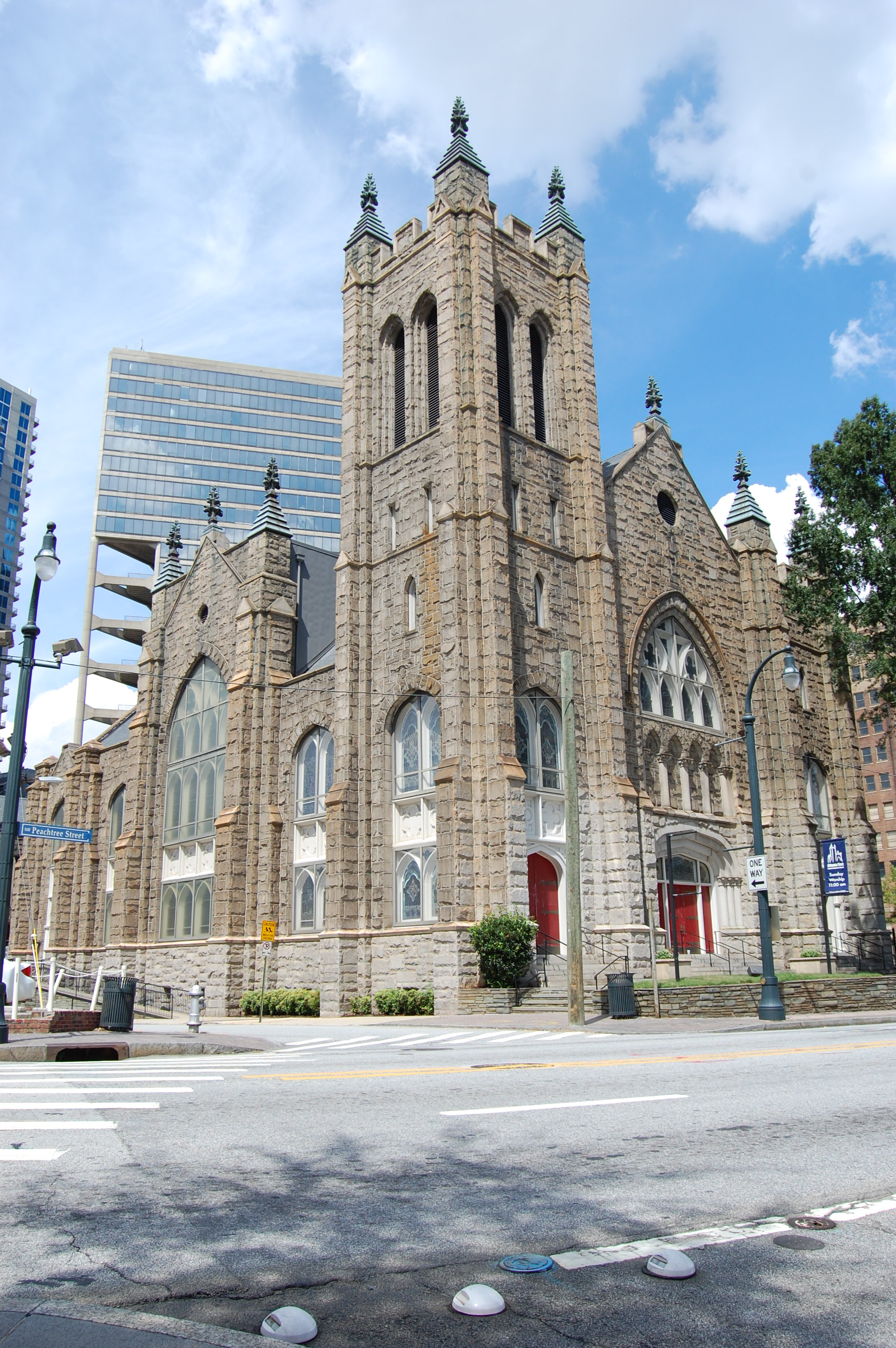
- Interactive map of the Atlanta First United Methodist Church area
- Alternative names: First Methodist Episcopal Church, South

General information
- Type: Church
- Location: 360 Peachtree Street NW; Atlanta, Georgia
- Coordinates: 33.7644°N 84.3858°W
- Completed: 1903

Design and construction
- Architect: Willis Franklin Denny
- First Methodist Episcopal Church, South
- U.S. National Register of Historic Places
- Architectural style: Gothic Revival architecture
- NRHP reference No.: 10001000
- Added to NRHP: December 7, 2010

The Atlanta First United Methodist Church has existed for more than 160 years and is one of the oldest churches in Atlanta. The current building was constructed in 1903, and the current name was adopted in 1968. The same bell has been used in three buildings since 1850, and it is the only church bell in Atlanta that is known to have survived the American Civil War. It was added to the National Register of Historic Places in 2010.

== History ==
In 1845, Samuel Mitchell donated a plot of land to the Methodists for constructing a school. On alternating Sundays, different denominations would use the small log cabin for church services. In 1847, the Methodists raised $700 to build their own chapel on new land. They were the first denomination to do this in Atlanta. The new building was called Wesley Chapel and was the first to have their current bell, which cost an additional $300. It was the only church mentioned in Gone With the Wind. Many daughter churches were formed as Wesley Chapel's congregation grew. They moved to a new Gothic cathedral that was designed by architect William H. Parkins in 1870. In 1902, the congregation sold the property to Asa Candler, where he founded the Coca-Cola Company. The current building was built in 1903 using granite from Stone Mountain for $161,000. The current name was adopted in 1968 after the Methodist Church and the Evangelical United Brethren merged.
