= Terrell County Courthouse (Georgia) =

- U.S. National Register of Historic Places
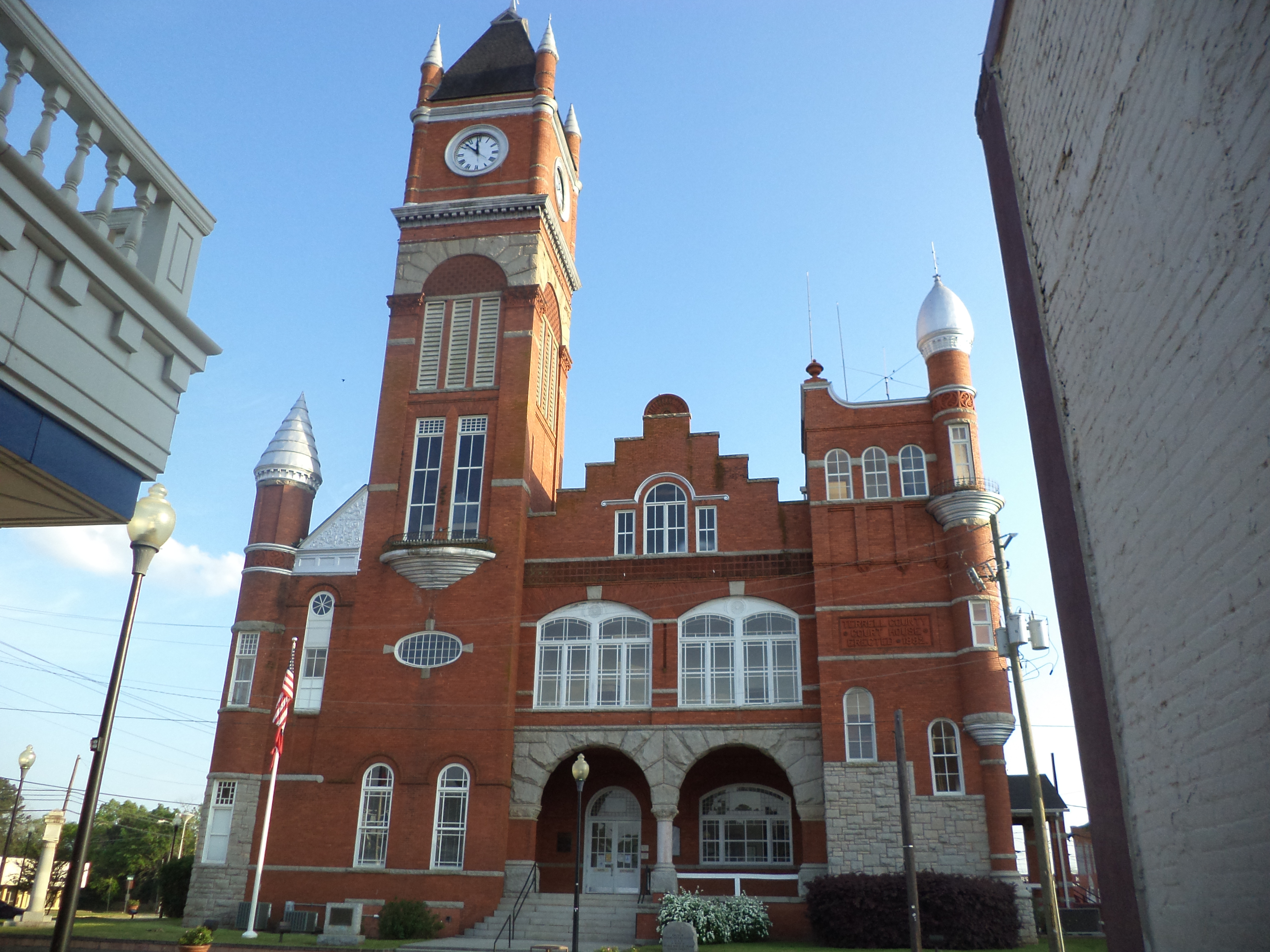

- Location within Georgia Location within the United States
- Location: E. Lee St., Dawson, Georgia
- Coordinates: 31°46′23″N 84°26′45″W
- Area: 2 acres (0.81 ha)
- Built: 1892
- Built by: J.B. Sample
- Architect: William H. Parkins
- Architectural style: High Victorian
- MPS: Georgia County Courthouses TR
- NRHP reference No.: 80001244
- Added to NRHP: September 18, 1980

The Terrell County Courthouse, in Dawson, Georgia, is a historic courthouse built in 1892. It was listed on the National Register of Historic Places in 1980.

Its NRHP nomination asserts it is the best exemplification of High Victorian architecture amongst all of Georgia's courthouses. It is described:

The building is asymmetrically massed with a tall pyramidal corner clock tower emphasised by turrets. Huge double Romanesque arches are on a lesser facade tower, The entrance which has a center one story projecting gabled porch is capped by a stepped gable; the side elevation has the same gable in a center entrance bay. Additional turrets - one with an onion dome, others which are helmeted - plus assorted gables, balconies, round arched, rectangular, and even a Palladian window combine in a grand and dramatic manner.
