= Thomas O'Reilly (priest) =

Irish-born missionary priest

Thomas O'Reilly (1831–1872) was an Irish-born missionary priest who served in the southern states of America. He is famous for negotiating with the Union forces not to destroy churches (of all denominations) and hospitals in Atlanta during the American Civil War.

== Biography ==
O’Reilly was born in Drumgora, County Cavan, Ireland in 1831, he studied to be a missionary priest at All Hallows College in Dublin. In 1857 he was sent to the American South as a missionary priest. In 1861 Fr. O’Reilly was appointed pastor of Atlanta’s first Catholic church, prior to that Catholics held masses in private homes.

O'Reilly, then serving at the Immaculate Conception Catholic Church in Atlanta, pleaded with Major General William Tecumseh Sherman not burn the city's churches or hospitals.

Fr O'Reilly died in a Virginia sanitarium at the age of 41 in 1872.
