= Francis Xavier Gartland =

Irish-born American prelate

His Excellency, The Right Reverend Francis Xavier Gartland
- Bishop of Savannah
- Church: Roman Catholic Church
- See: Diocese of Savannah
- In office: November 10, 1850 – September 20, 1854
- Predecessor: none
- Successor: John Barry

Orders
- Ordination: August 5, 1832 by Henry Conwell
- Consecration: November 10, 1850 by Samuel Eccleston

Personal details
- Born: January 13, 1805 Dublin, County Dublin, Ireland
- Died: September 20, 1854 (aged 49) Savannah, Georgia, US
- Education: Mount St. Mary's College
- Motto: Vincit veritas (Truth conquers)

Francis Xavier Gartland (January 13, 1805 – September 20, 1854) was an Irish-born American prelate of the Roman Catholic Church. He served as the first bishop of the Diocese of Savannah, covering Georgia and Eastern Florida, from 1850 until his death in 1854.

== Biography ==
=== Early life ===
One of ten children, Francis Gartland was born on January 13, 1805, in Dublin, Ireland, to James and Mary (née Conroy) Gartland. His family immigrated to the United States when he was a small child, settling in Philadelphia, Pennsylvania. Gartland studied the classics and theology at Mount St. Mary's College in Emmitsburg, Maryland.

Gartland was ordained to the priesthood for what was then the Diocese of Philadelphia by Bishop Henry Conwell on August 5, 1832. After his ordination, Garland served as curate under Reverend John Hughes at St. John's Parish in Philadelphia, becoming its pastor in 1838. Appointed vicar general of the diocese in 1845, Gartland was seen as Bishop Francis Kenrick's "chief lieutenant" in the latter's attempts to restore peace and order in Philadelphia following the Know Nothing riots. Garland became known as "the most popular priest in the city among all classes."

=== Bishop of Savannah ===
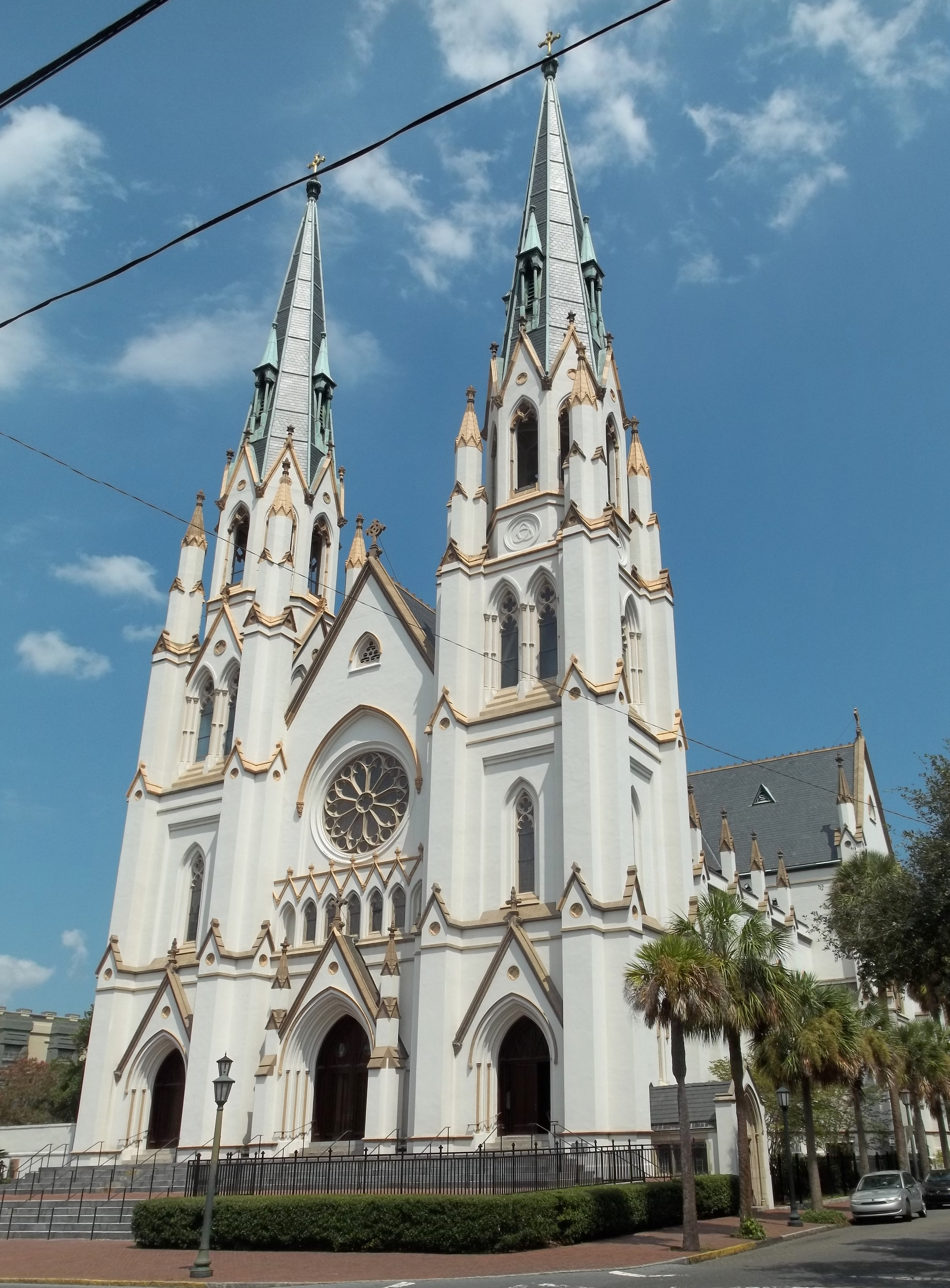
Cathedral Basilica of St. John the Baptist, Savannah, Georgia

On July 23, 1850, Gartland was appointed the first bishop of the newly erected Diocese of Savannah by Pope Pius IX. He received his episcopal consecration on November 10, 1850, from Archbishop Samuel Eccleston, with Bishops Francis Kenrick and Michael O'Connor serving as co-consecrators, in Philadelphia at St. John's Pro-Cathedral.

The new diocese (comprising the entire state of Georgia and eastern Florida) contained 15 churches, eight priests, and around 5,000 Catholics. During Gartland's tenure, the Catholic population doubled in the diocese; more priests were added, including recruits from Ireland; he erected three new churches; and enlarged the Cathedral of St. John the Baptist in Savannah, dedicated in June 1853. He also established an orphanage and several Catholic schools, and attended the Eighth Provincial Council of Baltimore in 1855.

As a bishop in the American South, Ryan considered "the freedom of the slave population" to be "untimely," saying, "All we have to do is mite their souls [so that] whether bond of free they may be saved."

In 1854, during a yellow fever epidemic, Gartland travelled around Savannah visiting the sick. On September 8th, a hurricane ripped off the roof from Gartland's residence.

=== Death ===
Francis Gartland died from yellow fever in Savannah on September 20, 1854, at age 49.

== See also ==
- Catholic Church hierarchy
- Catholic Church in the United States
- Historical list of the Catholic bishops of the United States
- List of Catholic bishops of the United States
- Lists of patriarchs, archbishops, and bishops

Catholic Church titles
Preceded by none	Bishop of Savannah; 1850–1854	Succeeded by John Barry
