= John Barry (bishop of Savannah) =

Irish-born Roman Catholic prelate

His Excellency, The Right Reverend John Barry
- Bishop of Savannah
- Church: Roman Catholic Church
- See: Savannah
- In office: August 2, 1857 – November 19, 1859
- Predecessor: Francis Xavier Gartland
- Successor: Augustin Verot

Orders
- Ordination: September 24, 1825 by John England
- Consecration: August 2, 1857 by Francis Kenrick

Personal details
- Born: July 16, 1799 Oylegate, County Wexford, Ireland
- Died: November 19, 1859 (aged 60) Paris, France

John Barry (July 16, 1799 – November 19, 1859) was an Irish-born prelate of the Roman Catholic Church. He served as the second bishop of the Diocese of Savannah, covering the state of Georgia, from 1857 to 1859.

== Biography ==
=== Early life ===
John Barry was born on July 16, 1799, in Oylegate, County Wexford, in Ireland to Sylvester and Mary (Donohue) Barry. While still a seminarian in Ireland, Barry was recruited to immigrate to the United States and finish his theology studies in the Diocese of Charleston.

=== Priesthood ===
Barry was ordained to the priesthood in Charleston, South Carolina, by Bishop John England for the Diocese of Charleston on September 24, 1825. Barry was then sent to Georgia (then part of the diocese), where he served as pastor of Holy Trinity Parish in Augusta from 1830 to 1854. During the cholera epidemic of 1832, Barry converted his house in Augusta into a hospital. When the epidemic was over, he converted it into an orphanage. Bishop Ignatius A. Reynolds appointed Barry as his vicar general and superior of the seminary in 1844.

When Pope Pius IX erected the Diocese of Savannah in 1850, Barry was incardinated, or transferred, there from the Diocese of Charleston. Bishop Francis Xavier Gartland appointed Barry as his vicar general in 1853.

=== Bishop of Savannah ===
On January 9, 1857, Barry was appointed to succeed Bishop Francis Gartland as bishop of Savannah by Pius IX. Barry received his episcopal consecration on August 2, 1857, at the Cathedral of the Assumption of the Blessed Virgin Mary in Baltimore, Maryland from Archbishop Francis Kenrick, with Bishops Michael Portier and John Neumann serving as co-consecrators.

=== Death ===
In July 1859, Barry traveled to France for medical treatment. John Barry died on November 19, 1859, in Paris at the convent of the Brothers Hospitallers of St. John of God. His remains were returned to Augusta, where he was buried at the Church of the Holy Trinity.

== See also ==
- Catholic Church hierarchy
- Catholic Church in the United States
- Historical list of the Catholic bishops of the United States
- List of Catholic bishops of the United States
- Lists of patriarchs, archbishops, and bishops

== Episcopal succession ==
Catholic Church titles
| Preceded by Francis Xavier Gartland | Bishop of Savannah; 1857–1859 | Succeeded by Augustin Verot |
