= Atlanta History (journal) =

Atlanta History: A Journal of Georgia and the South
- Discipline: History
- Language: English

Publication details
- Former names: Atlanta Historical Bulletin, The Atlanta Historical Journal
- History: 1927 to 2006
- Publisher: Atlanta History Center (United States)
- Frequency: Quarterly

Standard abbreviations
- ISO 4: Atlanta Hist.

Indexing
- ISSN: 0896-3975

Atlanta History: A Journal of Georgia and the South was a publication of the Atlanta Historical Society. It was established in 1927 with one issue per year as the Atlanta Historical Bulletin. In 1937, the journal began publishing three or four issues annually. At least one issue per year was published during World War II. By the middle 1950s, the publication again failed to have issues available each year. There were no issues between 1957 and 1965, with nearly a decade represented by Vol. X. Things proceeded smoothly from 1966 until the 1990s, except for no issues during the year 1974. There were occasional combined issues (1–2 or 3–4) too, and Volume XLV is particularly spotty signaling a major slowdown.

The issue dated Spring 1978 changed the name to The Atlanta Historical Journal and the issue dated Spring 1987 finally changed the name to Atlanta History: A Journal of Georgia and the South, then edited by Bradley R. Rice. with a similar design to the previous volumes. The issue marked Fall 1993 announced the opening of the new museum at the history center and presented a new logo, design, and layout for the magazine which continued into 2006. The last issue was Vol. 48 No. 1, dated Spring 2006.

Beginning with the resumption of the Bulletin in 1965 with issue No.39, a chapter or two from Franklin Garrett's book Atlanta and Environs: A Chronicle of its People and Events was included in each issue up to the last issue of 1973. This constituted almost the entirety of Volume I of the book, narrating Atlanta's history to 1872.
