= Franklin Garrett =

American historian

Franklin Miller Garrett (September 25, 1906 – March 5, 2000) was an American historian, particularly of Atlanta, Georgia. His massive Atlanta and Environs: A Chronicle of its People and Events is a book about the city's history.

== Biography ==
A native of Milwaukee, he moved to Atlanta in 1914. He graduated from Technological High School in Atlanta, Georgia. He joined the Atlanta Historical Society in 1927 (a year after it was founded) which is today known as the Atlanta History Center. He served as historian for the Coca-Cola Company for 28 years. After retirement he devoted his full-time efforts to the Atlanta History Center.

Atlanta and Environs was said to be building on Wallace Putnam Reed's History of Atlanta, Georgia (1889).

Garrett was married to Frances Steele Garrett, who died in September 2005.

== Awards ==
- Named "official historian" of the city by Atlanta City Council, 1974
- Honorary doctorate from Oglethorpe University
- Honorary doctorate from Georgia State University on June 20, 1998
- Shining Light award for community service
- The Georgia Railroad Named EMD GP 38-2 locomotive number 6051, as The Franklin M. Garrett in 1980. This locomotive ran on the Georgia R.R. until 1983, when the Georgia was Merged into Seaboard System. Seaboard System kept the name on the locomotive. The 6051 pulled the Last Georgia Mixed Train out of Atlanta in 1983. This locomotive today is CSXT 2702, retaining the name, and was to assigned to Atlanta's Tilford Yard. However Tilford was torn out completely in 2018 and the 2702 is currently assigned to Hamlet, North Carolina, the former Seaboard Air Line hump yard and is used on Hamlet-Raleigh, North Carolina and Hamlet-Columbia, South Carolina local trains.

== Books ==
- Garrett, Franklin Miller (1954). Atlanta and Environs: A Chronicle of Its People and Events. Athens, Georgia: University of Georgia Press. ISBN 0-8203-0263-5. OCLC 191446. (First published in 1954, later expanded to 3 volumes by Garrett and a fourth by another author)
- Garrett, Franklin M. (1966). Chronological History of the Coca-Cola Company, 1886-1965. Atlanta: Coca Cola Company. p. 8. OCLC 41694298.
- Garrett, Franklin M. (1971). Vignette History of Atlanta. Atlanta: Commerce Club. p. 76. OCLC 4314507.
- Garrett, Franklin M. (1974). Yesterday's Atlanta. Miami, FL: E.A. Seemann Publishing, Inc. p. 166. ISBN 0-912458-35-6. OCLC 984246.
