= Cathedral of Christ the King (Atlanta) =

Latin Catholic cathedral in Georgia, US

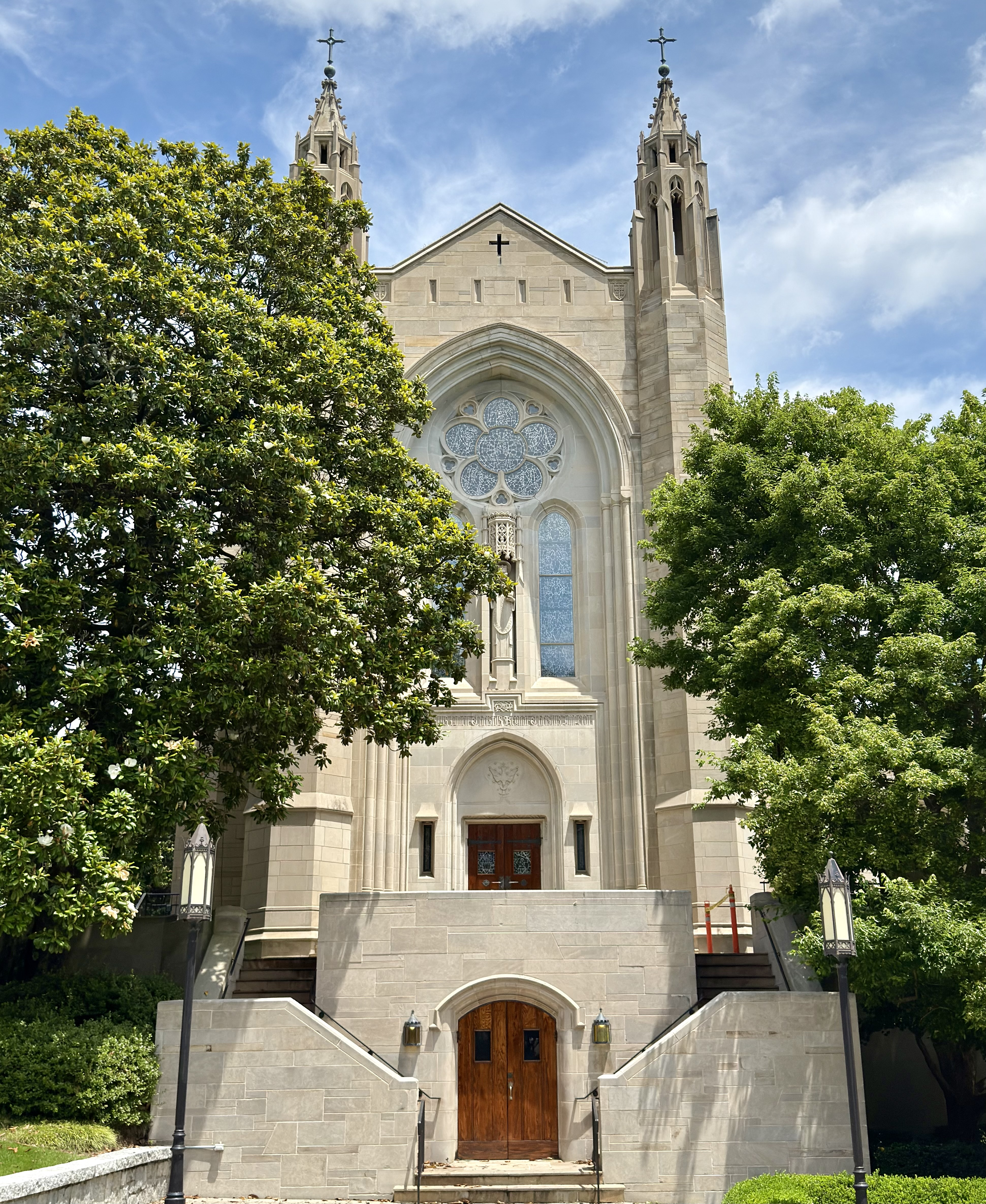
- The cathedral in 2025
- Cathedral of Christ the King
- 33°49′41″N 84°23′13″W
- Location: 2699 Peachtree Road; Atlanta, Georgia
- Country: United States
- Denomination: Catholic Church
- Sui iuris church: Latin Church
- Website: Cathedral of Christ the King

History
- Former name(s): Christ the King Church (1936–1937); Co-Cathedral of Christ the King (1937–1956)
- Status: Cathedral
- Founded: June 15, 1936
- Dedication: Christ the King
- Dedicated: January 18, 1939

Architecture
- Architect: Henry D. Dagit Jr.
- Style: French Gothic
- Groundbreaking: October 31, 1937
- Completed: December 1938

Specifications
- Capacity: 700

Administration
- Province: Ecclesiastical Province of Atlanta
- Archdiocese: Atlanta

The Cathedral of Christ the King is a Catholic church in the Buckhead district of Atlanta, Georgia, United States. It serves as the cathedral for the Archdiocese of Atlanta.

The parish of Christ the King had been established in 1936 by Bishop Gerald O'Hara of the Diocese of Savannah in response to population growth in the suburbs to the north of Atlanta. On behalf of the diocese, O'Hara purchased several acres of land along Peachtree Road in Buckhead that had previously been owned by the Knights of the Ku Klux Klan, using that group's former headquarters as a temporary church building and rectory. The following year, Atlanta was elevated to the status of co-cathedral city in the diocese, alongside Savannah, with Christ the King selected to be the co-cathedral. Work on a dedicated church building began in 1937 and continued into the next year, being dedicated in January 1939. In 1956, with the creation of the diocese of Atlanta, Christ the King became the sole cathedral in its territory. In 1962, the diocese was elevated to the status of an archdiocese, making Christ the King the seat of the region's archbishop.

The cathedral was designed in the French Gothic style by architect Henry D. Dagit Jr., though lacking in more intricate details typically associated with the style, such as flying buttresses. The primary materials used in its construction included Indiana limestone and granite and marble primarily quarried from in-state, and the interior was large enough to accommodate about 700 people. The church contains 65 stained glass windows designed by Willet Stained Glass Studios. As of 2012, the church had a membership of about 5,200 families. Meanwhile, as of 2003, Christ the King School, an affiliated K–8 school, had a membership of over 500 students.

== History ==
=== Founding and initial church building ===
In January 1936, Pope Pius XI appointed Bishop Gerald O'Hara as bishop of the Diocese of Savannah. At that time, all of Georgia was part of this diocese. Shortly after becoming bishop, O'Hara recognized the significance of Atlanta to the diocese, and he soon expressed a desire to establish a parish directly to the north of the city. During the 1930s, despite the effects of the ongoing Great Depression, the Atlanta metropolitan area continued to experience steady growth, and just north of the city limits, the district of Buckhead was developing from a largely rural area to a populous suburban one. (Note: At the time, Buckhead was an independent entity, separate from the bordering city of Atlanta. Atlanta would annex Buckhead in 1952.) As a result, in 1936, O'Hara, on behalf of the diocese, purchased a 4-acre (1.6 ha) property in Buckhead that a new church could be created on. The property had previously been under the ownership of the Knights of the Ku Klux Klan. A Greek Revival mansion on the property, which they referred to as their "Imperial Palace", had served as their headquarters starting in 1921. However, by 1936, the property had been foreclosed on, and the diocese was able to purchase the property from the holder of the mortgage, an insurance company. The total cost to the diocese was $35,000 (equivalent to $812,000 in 2025).

The new parish was officially established on June 15, 1936. Known as Christ the King Church, it was the fifth parish in the Atlanta area, following the parishes of Immaculate Conception, Sacred Heart, St. Anthony's, and Our Lady of Lourdes. The mansion was converted for use as a rectory, while a temporary altar was constructed on the front porch. The first mass was held two months after the parish's establishment, on August 15, on the Feast of the Assumption. The church's first pastor, Joseph Moylan, presided. While this initial mass utilized the front porch altar, a chapel was soon constructed in the first floor of the rectory that could hold up to 220 people. In the beginning, the parish had a membership of about 400 adults and 109 children. Many of the early members of the church, such as businessman J. J. Haverty and his family, had previously been members of Sacred Heart, located in downtown Atlanta. Later in the year, committees made up of parishioners were established to oversee the creation of a new church building and the establishment of a parochial school. The total cost of these two projects was projected to be $300,000 ($6.96 million in 2025), which was paid for primarily through fundraising, which included a $50,000 ($1.16 million in 2025) donation from Haverty.

As part of his focus on Atlanta, O'Hara petitioned the Holy See to change the Diocese of Savannah to the Diocese of Savannah-Atlanta, with a co-cathedral to be located in Atlanta. While an earlier effort led by Bishop Thomas Albert Andrew Becker to move the cathedral city entirely to Atlanta had failed, this co-cathedral proposition was accepted. In 1937, the Holy See approved O'Hara's request, and Christ the King was chosen to serve as the co-cathedral, on equal ranking with the existing Cathedral of St. John the Baptist in Savannah. As part of the agreement, the bishop would reside at various times throughout the year in both cities, and Holy Week ceremonies conducted by him would alternate every year between the two co-cathedrals.

=== Construction of the co-cathedral ===
Having secured a majority of the money needed for the projects, the church selected the architectural firm of Henry D. Dagit and Sons to design the new building, with Henry D. Dagit Jr. serving as the project's main architect. The firm was based in Philadelphia, where Bishop O'Hara had stationed prior to his relocation to Savannah, and had designed over 100 churches in the area, including the St. Francis de Sales Roman Catholic Church. Moylan made several suggestions to the architects regarding the design of the building, and based on this, the firm decided that the church would be similar to the Chapel of the Immaculate Conception at Rosemont College, which the firm had constructed several years prior. For the Atlanta project, they used many of the same materials and hired the same craftspeople who had worked on the chapel.

The construction of the building was undertaken by Griffin Construction Company, one of the oldest construction firms in the state, whose work in the city had also included The Temple. The building's stained glass was made by Henry Lee Willet of Willet Stained Glass Studios, which was based in Philadelphia at the time. However, due to funding and issues arising from World War II, the last stained glass window would not be installed until 1952.

On October 31, 1937, during the Feast of Christ the King, the cornerstone for the co-cathedral was laid in a ceremony that included a blessing from O'Hara. The following month, on November 4, O'Hara presided over the first mass to be conducted on the construction site, attracting about 400 people.

=== Dedication ===
Construction continued through 1938, finishing in December of that year. While the dedication was planned for the following month, a funeral held on December 12 for one of the founding members of the church was actually the first rite conducted within the newly built structure. A dispensation had been granted to allow for this. The dedication occurred on January 18, 1939, during the Feast of the Chair of Saint Peter. As part of the ceremonies, 21 archbishops and 110 bishops from across the United States were invited, while the dedication itself was to be overseen by O'Hara and Dennis Joseph Dougherty, a cardinal and archbishop of Philadelphia. Upon Dougherty's arrival by train the day prior, he had been greeted at Terminal Station by a crowd of roughly 3,000 spectators, including Atlanta Mayor William B. Hartsfield and members of the cadet corps from Marist College High School. Additional notable guests at the dedication included Georgia Governor Eurith D. Rivers and Hiram Wesley Evans, the latter being the imperial wizard of the Ku Klux Klan. In addition to the altars at the church, additional temporary altars were dedicated at the Hotel Ansley and the Atlanta Biltmore in order to allow traveling Catholic dignitaries to hold daily mass. On the year of its dedication, Architectural Record called it the most beautiful building in Atlanta.

=== Later history ===
Following World War II, Buckhead and the surrounding area experienced a growth in population (with annexation of the district into the city of Atlanta in 1952), prompting the Holy See to split the Diocese of Savannah-Atlanta into two separate dioceses in 1956. Within the newly created Diocese of Atlanta, Christ the King became the sole cathedral. During the early 1960s, the cathedral assisted with the development of Our Lady of Lourdes, a parish within its jurisdiction, with a substantial financial donation towards the creation of a new permanent building for the church. In 1962, the Diocese of Atlanta was elevated to the status of archdiocese, and since then, Christ the King has served as the site of installation for all subsequent archbishops. The following year, William Calhoun was ordained at the church as the archdiocese's first African American priest. In November 1967, as part of the Catholic–Lutheran dialogue stemming from the reforms of the Second Vatican Council, a joint Catholic–Lutheran service was conducted at the cathedral.

In 1994, the practice of perpetual adoration began at the cathedral. By the mid-2000s, the cathedral had a reported membership of roughly 5,300 families. In a 2012 publication, the church stated that they had a membership of about 5,200 families, while the archdiocese boasted roughly 1 million members. Around 2016, Daprato Rigali Studios conducted a restoration process on the cathedral's stained-glass windows. In September 2018, parishioners from around the archdiocese protested concerning the Catholic Church sex abuse cases in the United States.

== Architecture and design ==
=== Location ===
The cathedral is located at 2699 Peachtree Road. It is at the northeast corner of the intersection of Peachtree Road and Peachtree Way, on the block between the latter and East Wesley Road. It is located near two other large churches in the area that are also situated along Peachtree Road: the Episcopal Cathedral of Saint Philip, which serves as the cathedral for the Episcopal Diocese of Atlanta, and Second-Ponce de Leon Baptist Church.

=== Exterior ===
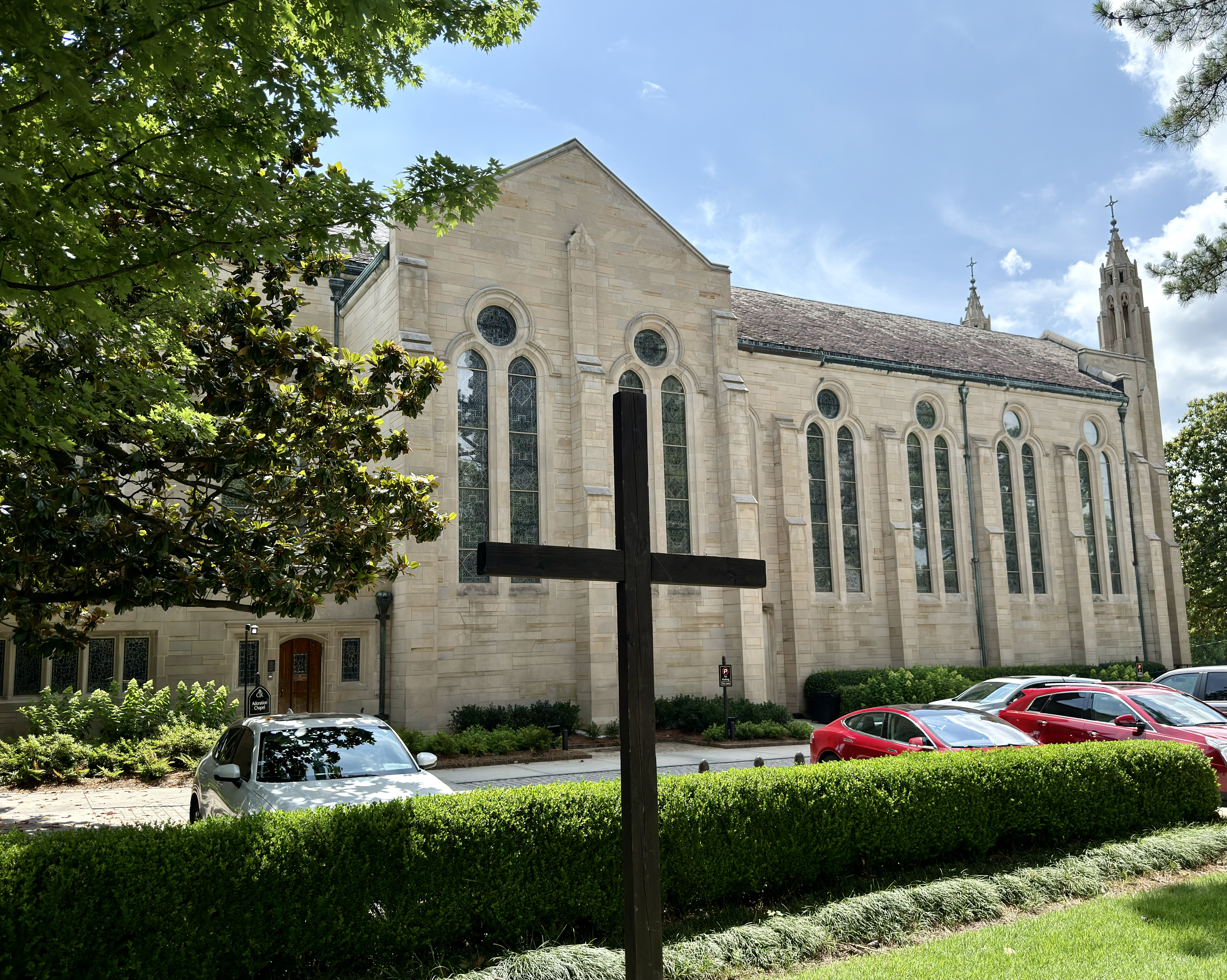
View of the west facade (2025)

The overall architectural style of the cathedral is French Gothic. (Note: This is attributed to multiple sources. However, other sources describe the cathedral's architectural style slightly differently, as either French Gothic Revival, Neo-Gothic, or simply Gothic.) In a 1940 book created by the Work Projects Administration, the agency described the structure as harkening back to the designs of 13th-century cathedrals, including in its general cruciform architectural plan, though deviating with its lack of long transepts and flying buttresses. The lack of intricate external details is further discussed in a 2012 biography of the cathedral, which states, "The cathedral is strikingly pure, devoid of frills and spare in its Gothic lines." Partially joking about the design, Moylan, who was an Irish American, said he had chosen the simplistic design, "So no Italian priest can come in here and change everything around."

The primary building materials included granite, Indiana Limestone, and marble. In sourcing the materials, both the marble and granite were quarried in Georgia, with the latter being resourced from Stone Mountain. Additional materials included slate from Vermont, which was used to construct the roof, and Italian marble, which had been sourced from Florence.

=== Interior ===
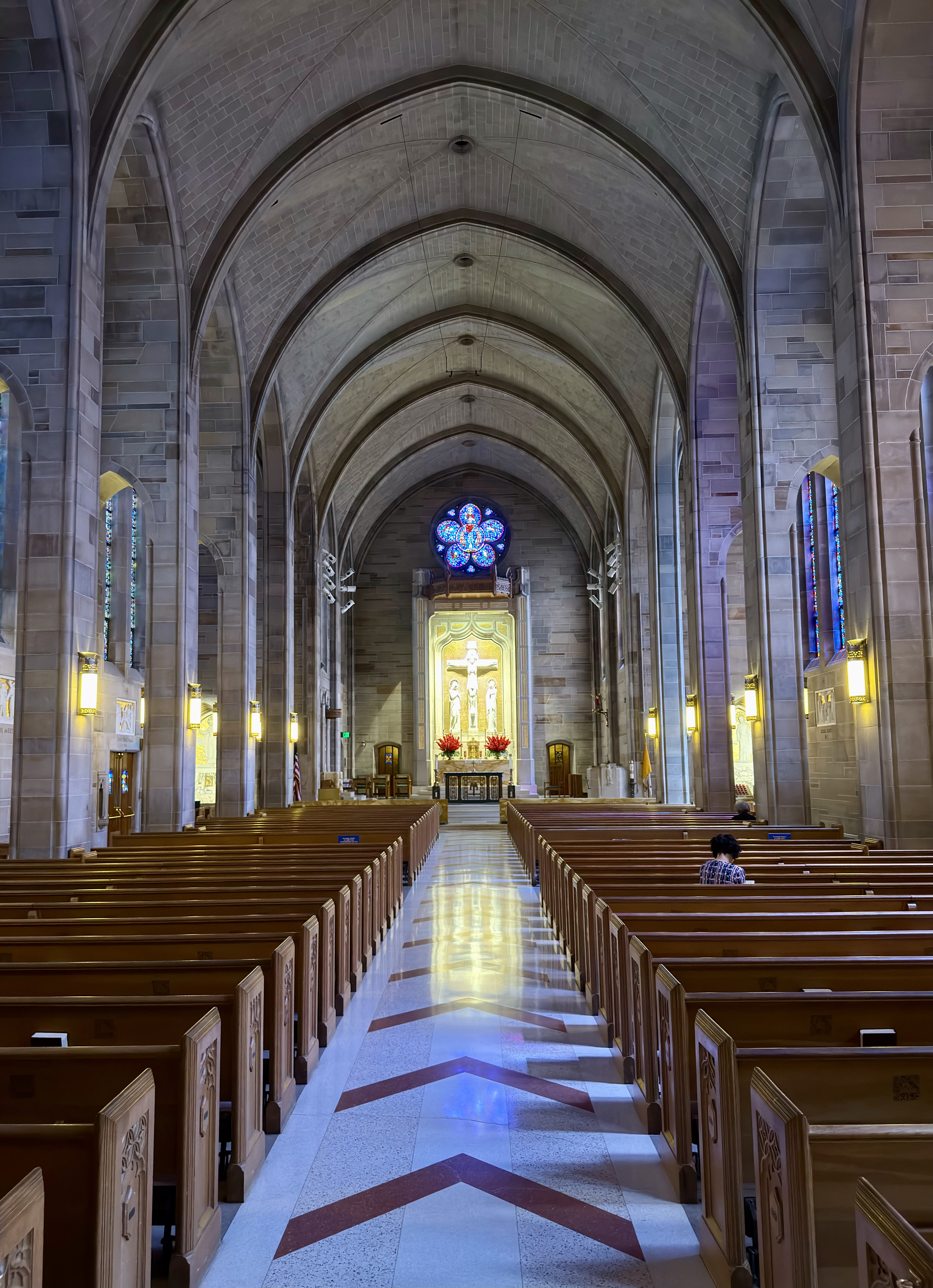
Cathedral nave (2025)

The interior, consisting of a large vaulted sanctuary, was designed to accommodate roughly 700 people. The altar is made of a solid block of marble imported from Siena. Behind the altar is a sculpture depicting the crucifixion of Jesus, made of marble, and surrounded by gold mosaics. The building contains 65 stained-glass windows, made up of 22 principal ones and 43 smaller ones. Collectively, these windows contain 201 references to stories from the Bible. Architect Robert Michael Craig, in a 2012 book, stated that the windows, which are primarily blue and ruby in color, "offered a modern parallel to the illumination provided by twelfth- and thirteenth-century medallion windows in such masterpieces of the French Gothic as Chartres Cathedral." Given its former status as a co-cathedral, both the church itself as well as the Cathedral of Saint John the Baptist in Savannah are depicted in the glasswork.

== Christ the King School ==
In 1937, the committees that had been established to oversee the construction of a new church building and the establishment of a new parochial school decided to focus their efforts on constructing the school first. On April 18 of that year, a groundbreaking for this new primary school building, located on the church grounds, took place. As with the cathedral, it was designed by Dagit and shares the same architectural style. Construction work was overseen by church member George P. Donnellan. During construction, the school, which was led by the Grey Nuns of the Sacred Heart, operated temporarily out of the rectory. Construction only lasted about six months, however, and the new building was blessed by O'Hara on October 31, with classes relocating from the rectory the following month. In November, mass celebrations were moved from the mansion to the school's auditorium.

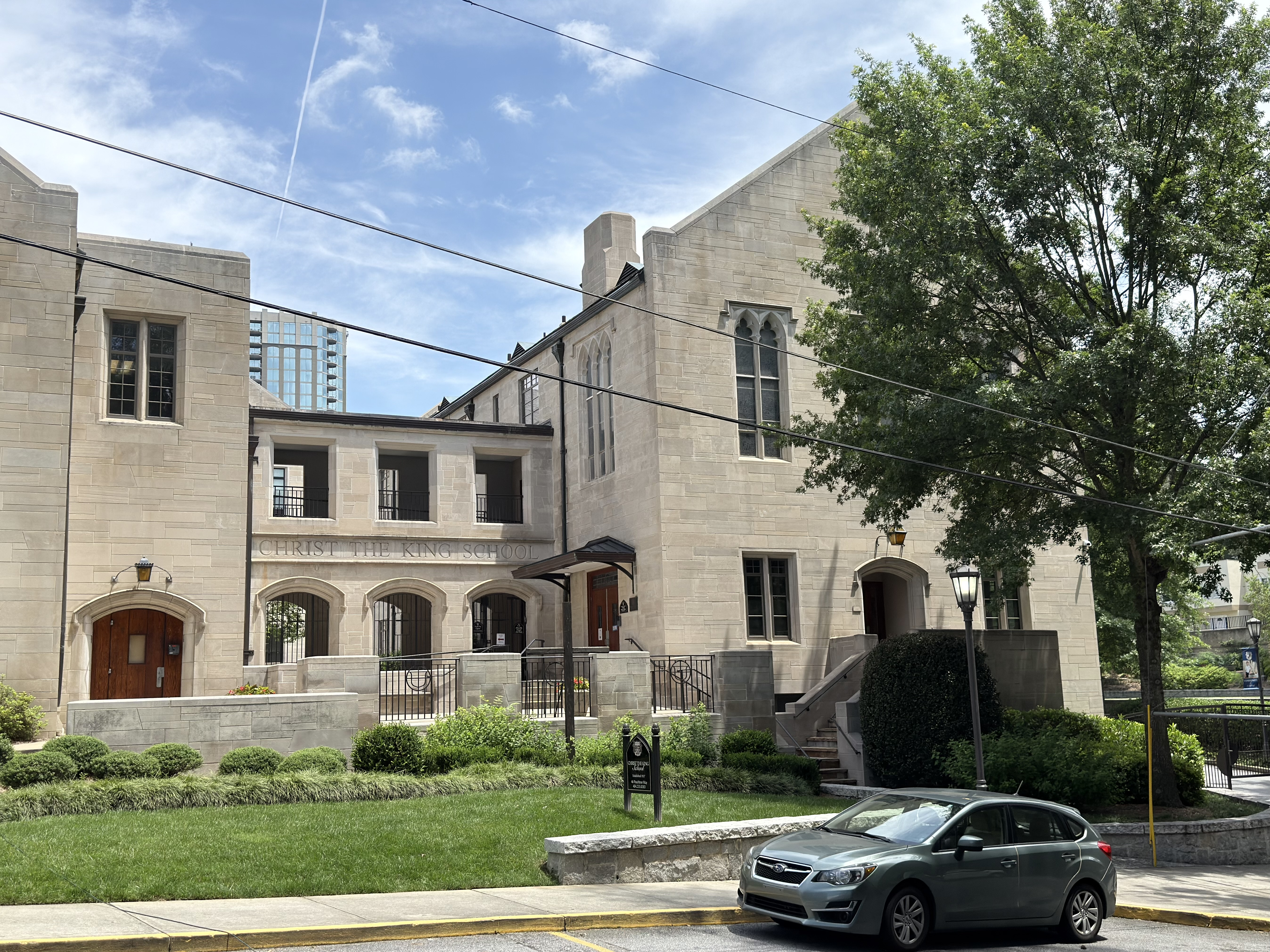
Christ the King School (2025)

Over the next several years, the school continued to grow and add several more grades, as well as high school courses. However, high school classes were dropped in 1958 after the creation of St. Pius X Catholic High School. In 1954, an addition to the school was constructed, and that same year, a new convent for the Grey Nuns was built. The Grey Nuns would continue to operate the school until the 1990s. Around 2003, the school underwent a major renovation project. At the time, it had an enrollment of about 540 students and served as a K–8 school.

== See also ==
- List of Catholic cathedrals in the United States
- List of Roman Catholic churches in the Archdiocese of Atlanta

== Sources ==
- Ahrendt, Theodore G. (December 1969). "A History of Lutheranism in Atlanta". The Atlanta Historical Bulletin. XIV (4). Atlanta Historical Society: 26–35. ISSN 0896-3975.
- Barnard, Susan Kessler (2009) [1996]. Buckhead: A Place for All Time (2nd ed.). Atlanta: WWAOW. ISBN 978-1-935038-08-5.
- Butterman, Eric (Spring 2016). "Church restoration a family reunion". Notre Dame Magazine. Archived from the original on July 8, 2024.
- Capelouto, J. D. (January 21, 2021). "What history and state law say about the push for Buckhead to become its own city". The Atlanta Journal-Constitution. Cox Enterprises. ISSN 1539-7459. OCLC 48488341. Archived from the original on November 28, 2024.
- Craig, Robert M. (2012). The Architecture of Francis Palmer Smith, Atlanta's Scholar-Architect. Athens, Georgia: University of Georgia Press. ISBN 978-0-8203-2898-0. OCLC 710903869.
- Diez, Christie (September 23, 2018). "Protesters rally against sex abuse scandal outside Atlanta's home Catholic church". WXIA-TV.
- Garrett, Franklin M. (2011) [1969]. Atlanta and Environs: A Chronicle of Its People and Events, 1880s-1930s. Vol. II (Paperback ed.). Athens, Georgia: University of Georgia Press. ISBN 978-0-8203-3904-7. OCLC 696916155.
- Hanley, John (2006). The Archdiocese of Atlanta: A History. Strasbourg: Éditions Du Signe. ISBN 978-2-7468-1773-9. OCLC 212755875.
- Hickel, Jan (2003). Buckhead: Atlanta's First Address. Corporate profiles by Candace T. Botha; Photography by L. A. Popp and Patrick Kelly. Macon, Georgia: Indigo Custom Publishing. ISBN 978-0-9725951-0-0. OCLC 54817511.
- Marten, Bettina (2022). "Tradition in the Age of Progress: Notions on Gothic Church Architecture in the United States". In Borngässer, Barbara; Klein, Bruno (eds.). Global Gothic: Gothic Church Buildings in the 20th and 21st Centuries. Leuven: Leuven University Press. pp. 50–73. ISBN 978-94-6270-304-9. OCLC 1266220277.
- Martin, Harold H. (2011) [1987]. Atlanta and Environs: A Chronicle of Its People and Events, 1940s-1970s. Vol. III (Paperback ed.). Athens, Georgia: University of Georgia Press. ISBN 978-0-8203-3906-1. OCLC 1465902492.
- Mickens, Leah (2022). In the Shadow of Ebenezer: A Black Catholic Parish in the Age of Civil Rights and Vatican II. New York City: New York University Press. ISBN 978-1-4798-1651-4. OCLC 1348481600.
- Pegram, Thomas R. (2011). One Hundred Percent American: The Rebirth and Decline of the Ku Klux Klan in the 1920s. Lanham, Maryland: Ivan R. Dee. ISBN 978-1-56663-711-4. OCLC 705568326.
- Rice, Tom (2015). White Robes, Silver Screens: Movies and the Making of the Ku Klux Klan. Bloomington, Indiana: Indiana University Press. ISBN 978-0-253-01848-9. OCLC 928716774.
- Smith, Amy Bonesteel (2012). Levin, Rob (ed.). Cathedral of Christ the King: The History 1937–2012. Atlanta: Bookhouse Group. ISBN 978-4-04-233214-5.
- Smith, William Rawson (2006). Villa Clare: The Purposeful Life and Timeless Art Collection of J.J. Haverty. Macon, Georgia: Mercer University Press. ISBN 978-0-86554-992-0. OCLC 64510380.
- Georgia: A Guide to Its Towns and Countryside. Work Projects Administration. Athens, Georgia: University of Georgia Press. April 1940. ISBN 978-1-62376-010-6.
