= St. Francis de Sales Catholic Church (Mableton, Georgia) =

St Francis de Sales Catholic Church
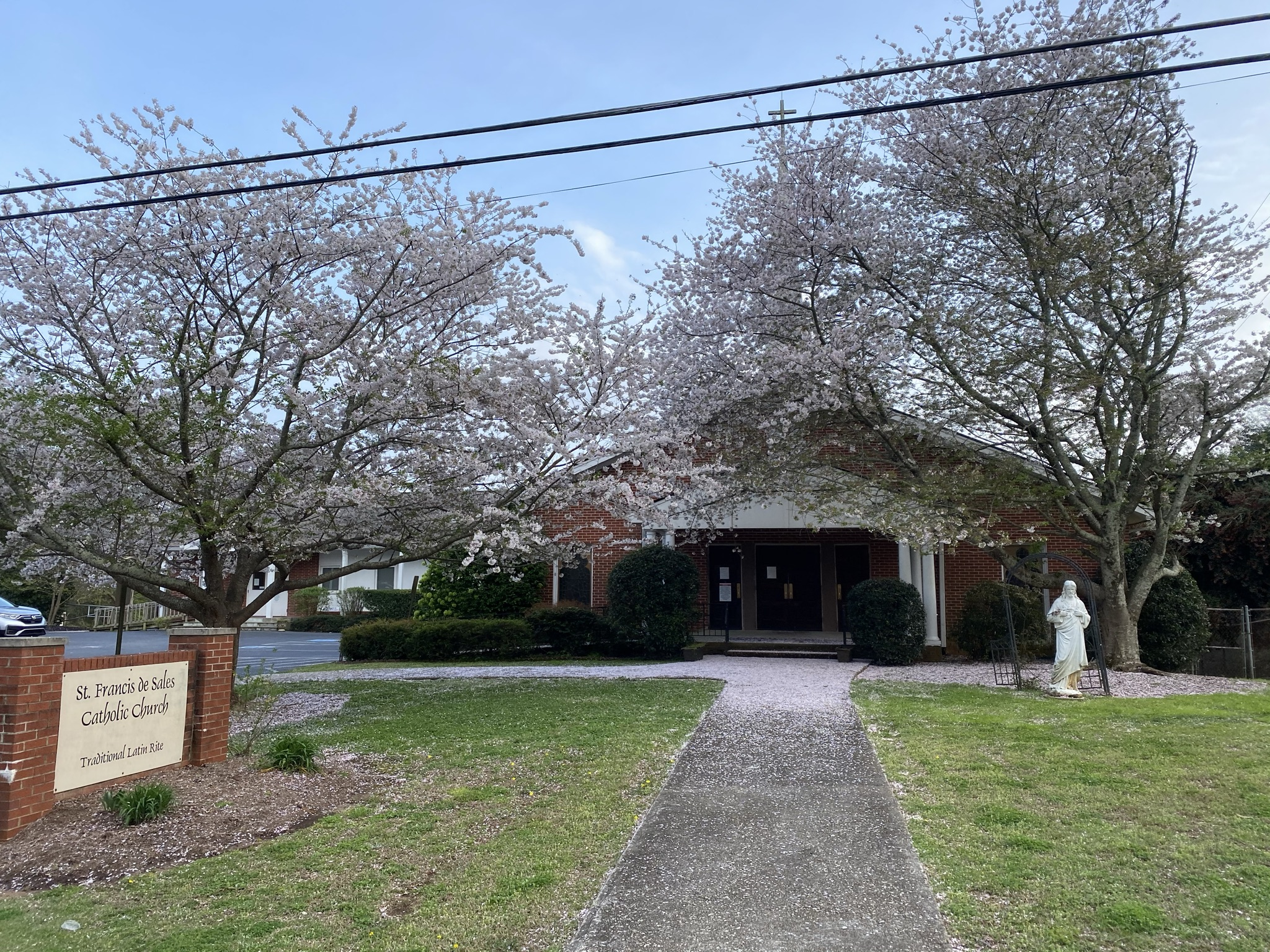
- St. Francis de Sales Catholic Church in Mableton, GA during Spring.
- St Francis de Sales Catholic Church
- Location: Mableton, GA
- Country: United States
- Website: https://fsspatl.com/

History
- Status: Parish church
- Dedication: St. Francis de Sales
- Consecrated: 2000

Administration
- Archdiocese: Atlanta

St. Francis de Sales Catholic Church, located in Mableton, Georgia, is the home of the Priestly Fraternity of St. Peter (FSSP) in the Roman Catholic Archdiocese of Atlanta. The community was founded in 1995 and established as a personal parish in 1999 by Archbishop John Francis Donaghue. The church (building) was purchased in 1999 and consecrated by Archbishop Donaghue in 2000.

== Liturgy ==
All of the Sacraments at St. Francis de Sales are celebrated according to the Roman Missal of 1962. Two Masses are generally celebrated every weekday, while three are celebrated on Sunday, one of which is a High Mass.

== History ==
St. Francis de Sales is a Latin Rite parish serving the Archdiocese of Atlanta, which was separated in 1956 from the Diocese of Savannah. Permission for Mass according to the rubrics of 1962 was initially given by Archbishop James P. Lyke and renewed by Archbishop John Francis Donoghue. The reinstatement of the Rite began at Holy Spirit parish in Buckhead and later moved to Sacred Heart Church with the support of its pastor, Fr. Stephen Churchwell. In 1994 the Priestly Fraternity of St. Peter began saying the Latin Mass at Sacred Heart.

The St. Francis de Sales Latin Mass Community was founded in 1995 with the arrival of a full-time priest. A rectory was soon established in Alpharetta and the Sunday Mass was moved to St. Joseph's Maronite Church in Atlanta. In 1998, the community was hosted at Sts. Peter and Paul Parish where a Sunday Mass at the Kelly & Leak Funeral Home was added. St. Francis de Sales finally found a permanent home the following year, in Mableton. The former Grace Baptist Church was purchased and the first Mass said in the new home in January. The community was also elevated to the status of a parish in January 1999, and Rev. Mark F. Fischer, FSSP, was named the founding pastor. He was later joined by Rev. Paul Roman, FSSP, and then later by Rev. Nicholas Zolnerowicz, a priest of the Congregation of the Blessed Sacrament, who served as parochial vicar until his retirement in 2003. He died in 2008.

In the spring of 2003, Rev. Robert Fromageot, FSSP became pastor, but in July 2004 he left to pursue a degree in moral theology in Rome. Rev. Denis G. Bouchard, FSSP, assisted by Rev. Laurent Demets, FSSP, replaced him as pastor until February 2008, when he was transferred to another FSSP apostolate, at which time Fr. Mark Fischer, the founding pastor, returned to the parish. He remained there until July 2010, when Fr. Howard Venette, FSSP, arrived. Fr. Venette would remain there until 2012, when he was transferred to another apostolate. Fr. Matthew McCarthy, FSSP, who was parochial vicar at that time, became pastor, and would remain so until 2017, when he was replaced by Fr. Carlos Casavantes, FSSP. A year later, in 2018, Fr. Casavantes was transferred, and would be replaced by Fr. Joseph DeGuzman, formerly parochial vicar, as pastor. Fr. Robert Dow would replace Fr. DeGuzman as pastor in 2020.

Fr. Demets served at the parish as parochial vicar from 2003 to 2007, when he left to serve an FSSP community in the Diocese of Little Rock, Arkansas. He was succeeded by Fr. Roberto Cano, FSSP, from 2007 to 2009, then by Fr. Thomas Fritschen, FSSP (2009–2010), Fr. Christopher Pelster, FSSP (2011), Fr. Matthew McCarthy, FSSP (2011–2012), Fr. Joel Kiefer, FSSP (2012–2015), Fr. Joseph DeGuzman, FSSP (2015–2018), and by Fr. James Smith, FSSP (2018–Present).

== Clergy ==
St. Francis de Sales Clergy — Current (as of August 2025)

- Pastor: Fr. Christopher Hathaway, FSSP (since July 13, 2025)
- Parochial Vicar / Assistant: Fr. Joseph Favole, FSSP
- In-Residence: Fr. Brian Austin, FSSP
- Deacon: Rev. Mr. Douglas Anderson (Permanent Deacon, Archdiocese of Atlanta)

== See also ==
- List of Roman Catholic churches in the Archdiocese of Atlanta
