= Christ the King School (Atlanta) =

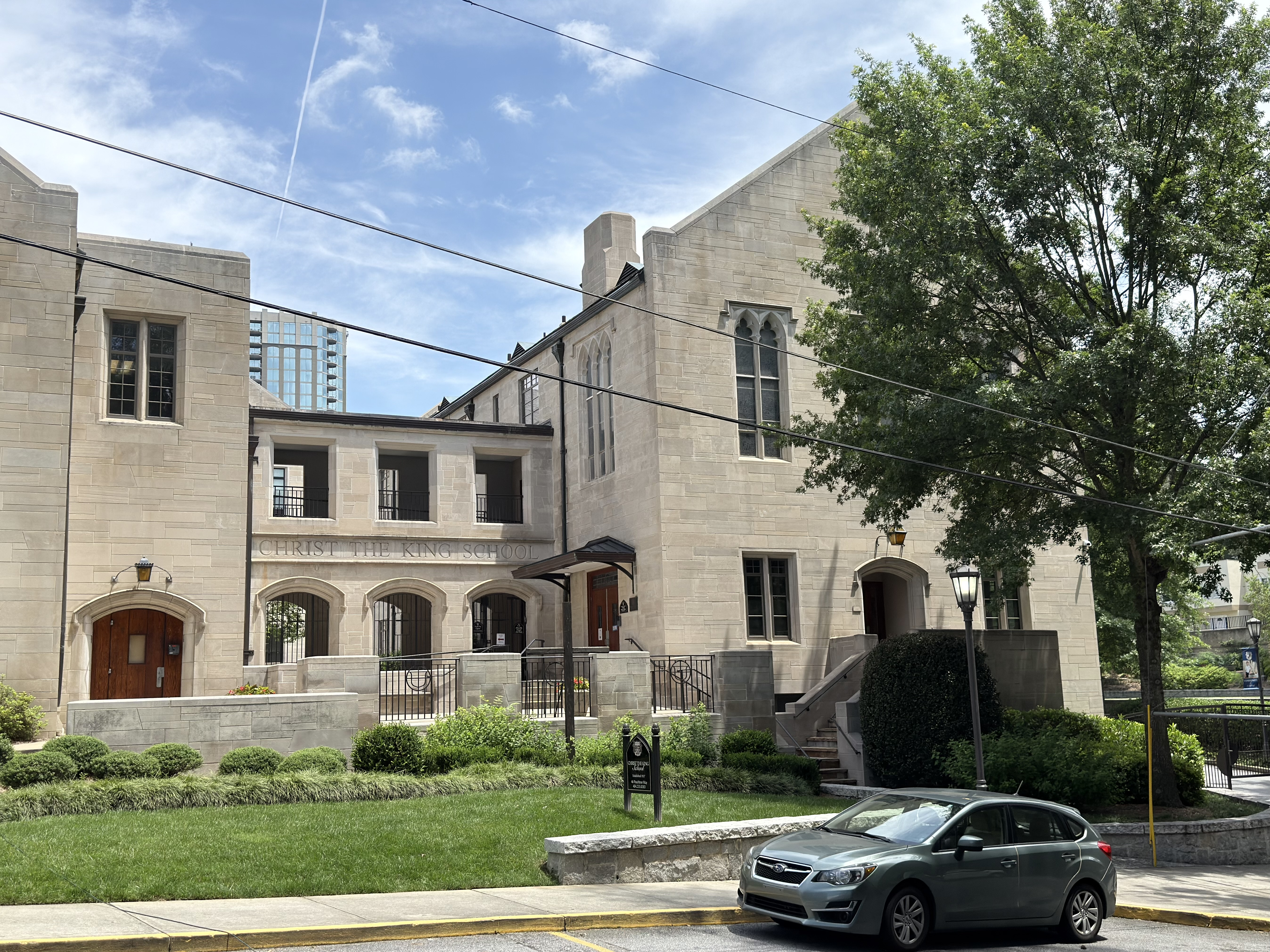

Location
- 46 Peachtree Way NE; Atlanta, Georgia 30305-3736; U.S. 33.827910°N 84.386204°W

Information
- Type: Private
- Religious affiliation: Roman Catholic
- Established: October 31, 1937
- Superintendent: Hal Plummer (Roman Catholic Archdiocese of Atlanta)
- Principal: Melissa Lowry
- Grades: Kindergarten - 8th grade
- Enrollment: 570
- Colors: Navy Blue and gold
- Team name: Lions
- Website: www.christking.org

Christ the King School (CKS) is a private, coeducational, Roman Catholic K-8 school in the Buckhead neighborhood of Atlanta, Georgia, United States. CKS is one of the five affiliate schools with the High Museum of Art in Atlanta.

== History ==
CKS was established in 1937 by the Grey Nuns of the Sacred Heart. It is overseen by the Archdiocese of Atlanta.

In 1940, high school grades were added. However, these were discontinued in 1958 when St. Pius X Catholic High School opened. It is located at 46 Peachtree Way NE in Georgia.

The mission statement is: "Christ the King School, a nurturing, Christ-centered environment based on the Catholic tradition, fosters academic excellence, individual responsibility, spirituality, and growth of the whole child."

In the fall of 2019, CKS opened a new building with science labs, a music room, a news room, and middle school classrooms. This was the result of a $30 million capital campaign.

== Students and faculty ==
Its student population is 85% White, 9% Hispanic, 2% Asian, 1% Black, and 3% two or more races. The total number of students for the 20021–21 school year is 570. Sixteen percent of the students receive financial aid.

CKS has 35 classroom teachers. The student–teacher ratio is 15 to 1.

Mrs. Patricia Ward was the CKS principal in 2018. She was followed by Brian Newhall. The current principal is Melissa Lowry.

== Awards and honors ==
- The U.S. Department of Education named Christ the King School a National Blue Ribbon School in 1987, 2007 and 2018.
- CKS Serves, a family-based service outreach program, won national recognition from Today’s Catholic Teacher magazine in 2017.

== Notable alumni ==
- Paul V. Applegarth, former CEO of the Millennium Challenge Corporation and executive with World Bank and Bank of America

== See also ==
- Cathedral of Christ the King (Atlanta)
