= List of churches in the Archdiocese of Atlanta =

This is a list of the Roman Catholic Churches in the Archdiocese of Atlanta.

Date parish founded	Church	Location	Image	Current building begun	Notes
1790s	The Heritage Center of the Purification of the Virgin Mary	Sharon		1833	
1846	Shrine of the Immaculate Conception	Atlanta		1869	
1874	Sacred Heart Church	Milledgeville			
1880	Basilica of the Sacred Heart of Jesus	Atlanta		1897	
1903	St. Anthony of Padua Catholic Church	Atlanta		1911	
1906	St. Joseph Catholic Church	Marietta		1952	
1912	Our Lady of Lourdes Catholic Church	Atlanta		1960	
1936	Cathedral of Christ the King	Atlanta		1937	
1936	St. Peter Catholic Church	LaGrange			
1941	St. Thomas More Catholic Church	Decatur		1952	
1942	Sacred Heart Catholic Church	Griffin			
1943	St. Mary, Mother of God	Jackson		2004	
1943	St. James the Apostle Catholic Church	McDonough		1971	
1951	Our Lady of the Assumption Catholic Church	Brookhaven		1957	
1954	St. Paul of the Cross Catholic Church	Atlanta		1957	
1958	Immaculate Heart of Mary Catholic Church	Atlanta		2006	
1959	Ss. Peter and Paul Catholic Church	Decatur		1959	
1960	St. Jude the Apostle Catholic Church	Atlanta		1962	
1960	St. Luke the Evangelist Catholic Church	Dahlonega		1898	
1960	Most Blessed Sacrament Catholic Church	South Fulton		1989	
1964	Holy Cross Catholic Church	Atlanta		1989	
1964	Holy Spirit Catholic Church	Atlanta		1995	
1965	Our Lady of Perpetual Help Catholic Church	Carrollton		1962	
1967	St. James Catholic Church	Madison		1995	
1972	St. Anna Catholic Church	Monroe			
1973	Holy Family Catholic Church	Marietta		1973	
1973	Holy Trinity Catholic Church	Peachtree City		1980	
1975	Prince of Peace Catholic Church	Flowery Branch		2005	
1977	All Saints Catholic Church	Dunwoody			
1977	Good Shepherd Catholic Church	Cumming			
1978	St. Ann Catholic Church	Marietta		1980	
1981	St. Catherine of Siena Catholic Church	Kennesaw		1981	
1981	St. Andrew Catholic Church	Roswell		1987	
1982	Queen of Angels and St. Joseph Catholic Churches	Thomson			
1982	Sacred Heart of Jesus	Hartwell			
1984	Christ Our Hope Catholic Church	Lithonia		2000	
1984	Our Lady of the Mountains Roman Catholic Church	Jasper		2003	
1984	Our Lady of La Salette Catholic Church	Canton			
1984	Our Lady of the Mount Catholic Church	Lookout Mountain			
1985	St. Theresa Catholic Church	Douglasville		1985	
1987	St. Gabriel Catholic Church	Fayetteville		1994	
1988	Transfiguration Catholic Church	Marietta		1988	
1996	Christ Our King and Savior Catholic Church	Greensboro			
1998	Our Lady of Vietnam Catholic Church	Riverdale			
1999	St. Francis de Sales Catholic Church	Mableton		1999	
2000	St. Brigid Catholic Church	Johns Creek		2002	
2003	St. Mary Magdalene Catholic Church	Newnan			
2005	St. Peter the Rock Catholic Church	Thomaston			
2006	Holy Family Knanaya Catholic Church	Loganville		2009	
2006	Mary Our Queen Catholic Church	Peachtree Corners			
2007	Good Samaritan Catholic Church	Ellijay			
2008	Korean Martyrs Catholic Church	Doraville			
2013	Holy Vietnamese Martyrs Catholic Church	Norcross		2017	
2015	Holy Name of Jesus Chinese Catholic Mission	Norcross		2016	
2017	Saint Aelred Catholic Church	Bishop			
2021	St. Andrew Kim Korean Catholic Church	Duluth			
	Epiphany of Our Lord Byzantine Catholic Church	Roswell			
	Kidanemehret Eritrean Ge'ez Rite Catholic Church	Stone Mountain			
	Mother of God Ukrainian Catholic Church	Conyers			

== See also ==
- List of Catholic churches in the United States
