= Anderson Russell =

American football player (born 1987)

No. 32, 40
- Position: Safety

Personal information
- Born: May 30, 1987 (age 39); Atlanta, Georgia, U.S.
- Listed height: 6 ft 0 in (1.83 m)
- Listed weight: 205 lb (93 kg)

Career information
- High school: Marist (Atlanta)
- College: Ohio State
- NFL draft: 2010: undrafted

Career history
- Washington Redskins (2010); Miami Dolphins (2011–2012); Carolina Panthers (2012); Carolina Panthers (2014)*
- * Offseason or practice squad member only

Career NFL statistics
- Total tackles: 2
- Stats at Pro Football Reference

Anderson Russell (born May 30, 1987) is an American former professional football player who was a safety in the National Football League (NFL). He was signed by the Washington Redskins as an undrafted free agent in 2010. He played college football for the Ohio State Buckeyes.

== Professional career ==
=== Washington Redskins ===
Russell was signed by the Washington Redskins as a drafted free agent in 2010. He appeared in two games in 2010 before being placed on IR. He was released before the start of the 2011 season.

=== Miami Dolphins ===
Russell was signed to the Miami Dolphins' practice squad on September 7, 2011. He was promoted to the 53 man roster on November 3, 2012, but was released soon after.

=== Carolina Panthers ===
Russell was signed to the Carolina Panthers practice squad shortly after his release from the Dolphins. He was promoted to the 53 man roster on December 11, 2012. He was released after three games. He re-signed in time to appear at the Panthers 2013 training camp, but was released before the start of the 2013 season.

On February 27, 2014, Russel was re-signed to the Panthers roster.
