= McLendon Hospital =

Defunct hospital in Atlanta, Georgia, U.S.

Geography
- Location: 1366 Bernard Street NW, Atlanta, Georgia, United States

Services
- Beds: 60 (1958)

History
- Founded: 1946
- Closed: Early 1980s

Links
- Lists: Hospitals in the United States

McLendon Hospital was a health facility in Atlanta, Georgia, United States. It was established in 1946 and, at the time of its founding, was one of only two hospitals in the city to serve African Americans. It closed in the 1980s.

== History ==
The hospital was established in 1946 by Frederick Earl McLendon, a doctor, to serve African Americans in Atlanta. At the time that it opened, it was one of only two facilities in the city that served African Americans, with the other being the Harris Memorial Hospital, which had been founded in the 1920s. In a 1946 article, The Atlanta Constitution noted that McLendon Hospital had 30 beds. The hospital was housed in three buildings located in the Hunter Hills and Mozley Park neighborhoods of Atlanta and offered a variety of services, including general medicine, gynecology, obstetrics, pediatrics, and surgery. In 1955, the hospital hosted the first church services for St. Paul of the Cross Catholic Church. By 1958, the hospital had grown to 60 beds. At the time, both African American and White American physicians practiced at the facility.

The hospital ceased operations in the early 1980s. By 2023, of the three buildings that had housed the hospital's facilities, only one, located at 1366 Bernard Street NW in the Hunter Hills neighborhood, remained standing. According to a WAGA-TV article published that year, there had been some efforts to preserve the building, but they had failed, and the building, which was privately owned, was in a deteriorated state. The building was highlighted by David Yoakley Mitchell, the executive director of the Atlanta Preservation Center, in a 2023 interview with the Atlanta Voice, where he said, "We should be advocating and encouraging thoughtful preservation and economic development of buildings, structures, and spaces like the McLendon Hospital as a matter of national policy, which is needed now more than ever."
