= Paul V. Applegarth =

American business executive (born 1946)

- Born: Paul Vollmer Applegarth; April 21, 1946 (age 79); Wilkinsburg, Pennsylvania, US
- Education: Harvard Business School Harvard Law School Yale University
- Occupation(s): business executive, financier
- Employer(s): Finnacle Financial Advisors German Marshall Fund; Millennium Challenge Corporation; Value Enhancement International; Emerging Africa Infrastructure Fund; Emerging Markets Partnership; United Way of America; American Express; Bank of America World Bank
- Known for: first CEO of the Millennium Challenge Corporation
- Awards: Baker Scholar
- Honours: White House Fellows

Paul Vollmer Applegarth (born April 21, 1946) is an American business executive, financial consultant, banker, and lawyer. He was the first chief executive officer of the Millennium Challenge Corporation, President George W. Bush's flagship project to provide development aid to poor countries.

== Early life ==
Applegarth was born in Wilkinsburg, Pennsylvania. He is the son of Alice (née Vollmer) and William "Bill" Francis Applegarth, an engineer, college professor, and manufacturer of air conditioners. The family moved to Atlanta, Georgia in 1947 where Applegarth was raised.

He attended the Christ the King School, before going to the Marist School where he was manager of the football team and graduated in 1964. Applegarth attended Yale University, receiving a B.A. cum laude in economics, with a minor in corporate finance and development, in 1968. While there, he was a member of the fraternity of St. Anthony Hall.

From 1968 to 1970, he served as a lieutenant, then captain, in the United States Army during the Vietnam War. He describes his role in Vietnam as "part Peace Corps and part Special Forces." In addition to combat, he built schools and trained village chiefs.

Applegarth received an M.B.A. from Harvard Business School and a J.D. from Harvard Law School in 1974. He received First Year Honors and was a Baker Scholar from Harvard Business School.

== Career ==
Applegarth began his career with World Bank in 1974, remaining there until 1983. From 1981 through 1982, he was a White House Fellow. He worked for Secretary of Defense Robert McNamara at the International Finance Corporation (IFC). He was also a senior advisor to Secretary of State Colin Powell at the United States Department of State.

He worked at Bank of America in San Francisco as head of North American investment banking and head of the global project finance business from 1983 to 1986. He was also a financier with American Express/Lehman Brothers in New York City from 1987 to 1994. Applegarth was a loaned executive, becoming the chief financial officer of the United Way of America and helping the nonprofit recover from a financial scandal. In 1994, He became managing director of the Emerging Markets Partnership, working in England, Hong Kong, and Washington D.C. until 2003.

Applegarth was managing director and chief operating officer of the Emerging Africa Infrastructure Fund from 2001 to 2002. Sponsored by European governments, this fund combined private sector money with public funding to build power plants, roads, and other infrastructure in Sub-Saharan Africa. Applegarth then became chief executive officer of the consulting firm, Value Enhancement International.

In 2004, President George W. Bush appointed Applegarth as the first chief executive officer of the Millennium Challenge Corporation (MCC). A new approach to foreign aid, MCC was established as an independent government organization. It awarded grants to partners, some of the poorest countries in the world, who are committed to economic and political freedom. Applegarth said the job “represents a culmination of an awful lot I’ve done in my life. The job and the whole mission seemed to be made for me.” In June 2005, he announced that he would be stepping down from his CEO position after just eleven months.

He was a Senior Transatlantic Fellow at the German Marshall Fund from 2005 to 2006. In 2009, Applegarth joined Finnacle Financial Advisors, an international investment bank group.

== Awards and honors ==
- Alumnus of Year, Marist School, 2000
- White House Fellows, 1981–1982
- Baker Scholar, Harvard Business School, 1974

== Personal life ==
His family lived in Greenwich, Connecticut. However, they moved to Naples, Florida sometime before 2015. He is president of The Applegarth Tubman Medicine Hill Preservation and Educational Foundation in Maryland. He speaks Chinese, French, Spanish, Tagalog, and Vietnamese.

== External sources ==
Paul Applegate C–SPAN interview
