= St. Paul of the Cross Catholic Church =

Catholic church in Atlanta, Georgia, United States

- St. Paul of the Cross Catholic Church
- 33°46′13″N 84°29′38″W
- Location: Atlanta, Georgia
- Address: 551 Harwell Road NW
- Country: United States
- Denomination: Catholic
- Website: St. Paul of the Cross Catholic Church

History
- Founded: November 11, 1954
- Dedication: Paul of the Cross
- Dedicated: October 23, 1960

Architecture
- Architect: John B. Baumann
- Style: Mid-century modern
- Years built: 1959–1960

Administration
- Province: Ecclesiastical Province of Atlanta
- Archdiocese: Archdiocese of Atlanta

St. Paul of the Cross Catholic Church is a Roman Catholic church in Atlanta, Georgia, United States. The parish was established by the Passionists in 1954 from territory of Our Lady of Lourdes Catholic Church. Like Our Lady of Lourdes, this new church was created to serve African Americans in the city. In 1960, the church building, located on Harwell Road NW in western Atlanta, was dedicated. The parish also operated a parochial school that was staffed by members of the Sisters of St. Joseph of Baden, Pennsylvania. The school ceased operations in 1989. In 2006, the church had a membership of over 448 families.

== History ==
=== Establishment ===
The church was founded in 1954. In February of that year, Monsignor James Grady of the Shrine of the Immaculate Conception in Atlanta contacted the Passionists of the Saint Paul of the Cross Province to discuss the possibility of that order establishing a presence in the city. The Passionists approved the request to establish a mission and Grady subsequently reached out to Francis Edward Hyland, an auxiliary bishop of the Diocese of Savannah-Atlanta. On November 6, Hyland approved the name of the church, which was dedicated to Paul of the Cross, and appointed the Reverend Emmanuel Trainor, a Passionist priest, as the church's pastor. The church was officially established several days later on November 11, and on November 14, the church was announced during Mass services at Our Lady of Lourdes Catholic Church in Atlanta. The new parish was established from the territory of Our Lady of Lourdes, which at the time was the city's only parish for Black Catholics, and many of its initial members were African Americans.

The church's first mass was held on January 20, 1955, in an assembly room of McLendon Hospital in northwestern Atlanta. Beginning in 1956, construction began on facilities for the parish. In February 1958, a parochial school was dedicated, with the building also serving as a chapel and a residence for the priest. At the same time, a convent for the Sisters of St. Joseph of Baden, Pennsylvania, who staffed the school, was also constructed. Beginning in 1959, an official church building was constructed, which was completed the following year and dedicated by Hyland on October 23, 1960. John B. Baumann served as the architect for the church building, while construction work for all three buildings was performed by DeGive, Dunham, O’Neill. Two years after the church's dedication, the parish, as well as all institutions within the Archdiocese of Atlanta, was desegregated by order of Archbishop Paul John Hallinan.

=== Later history ===
In 1989, the parochial school ceased operations. In 1999, the parish had a membership of about 700 families, making it the largest majority-African American parish in Atlanta. According to a 2006 history book on the archdiocese, the parish at the time was trying to extend its ministry to Hispanic Americans, which included performing some Mass services in Spanish. As a result, the congregation had become more diverse than it historically had been. At the time, it had a membership of over 448 families.

== Architecture and design ==
The church is located at 551 Harwell Road NW in western Atlanta. It is situated on a 37-acre (15-hectare) property that also includes the school building and a convent. It was designed in the mid-century modern architectural style and shares many design elements with other churches constructed during the 1950s, including a gable roof with a low pitch and a veneer consisting of bricks and panels. The western front of the church building consists of three sections, with a stone section flagged on either side by stained glass, which was designed by Paris-based artist Jean Barillet. The middle section featured a crucifix flanked by depictions of John and Mary. (Note: The source that provides this information does not provide further specificity as to the identity of the two individuals and only refers to them as "Mary and John", which could refer to multiple individuals from Christianity.) While the north side of the church features several windows, only a single stained glass window near the altar is present on the south wall. Concerning the buildings, architectural historian Robert M. Craig has said, "the buildings comprise one of the city’s most notable midcentury modernist religious complexes."

== See also ==
- List of churches in the Archdiocese of Atlanta
