= Basilica of the Sacred Heart of Jesus (Atlanta) =

Roman Catholic basilica in Atlanta

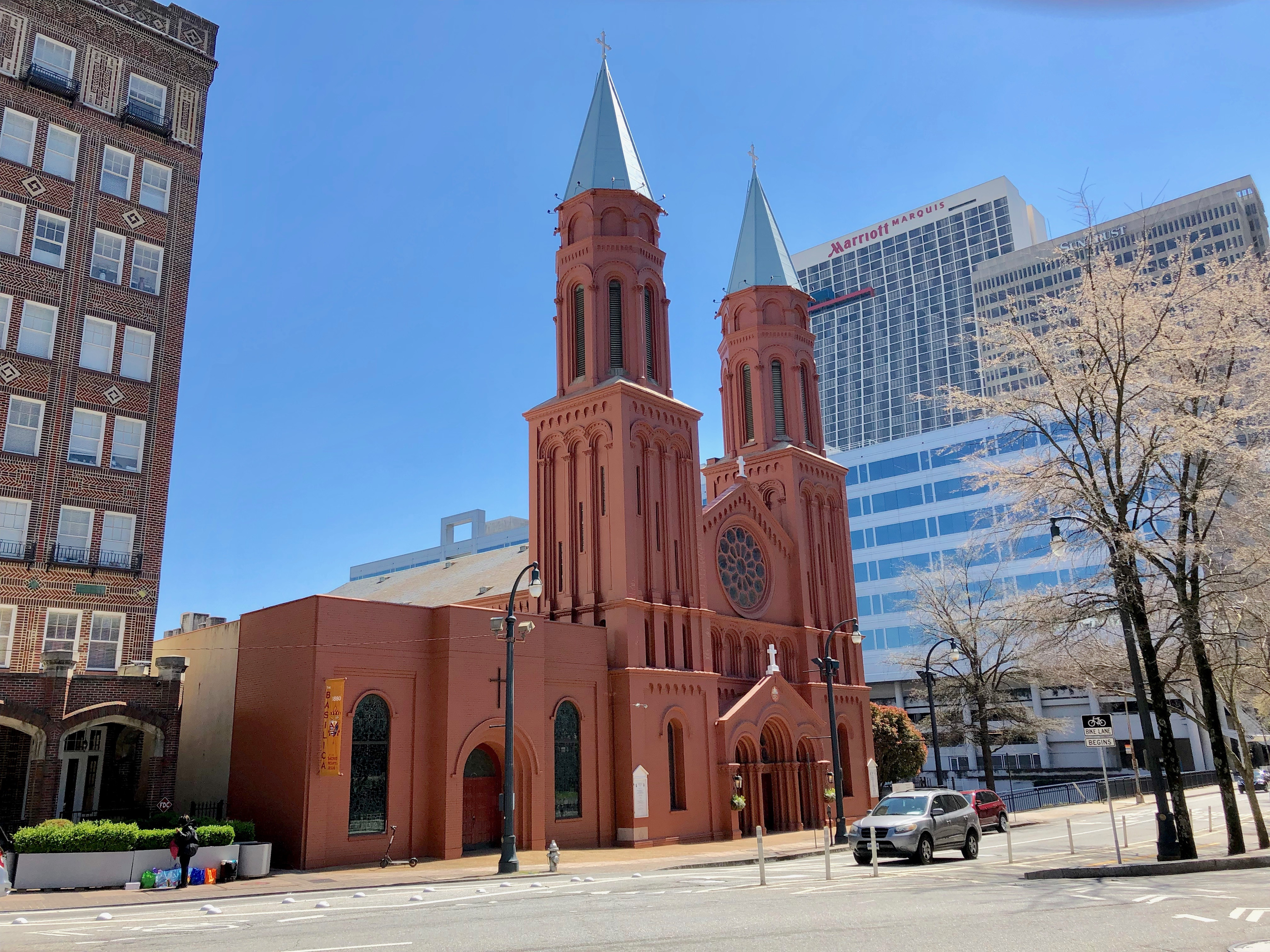
- The church in 2019
- Basilica of the Sacred Heart of Jesus
- 33°45′49.5″N 84°23′8.5″W
- Location: 353 Peachtree Street NE; Atlanta, Georgia
- Country: United States
- Denomination: Catholic
- Tradition: Roman Rite
- Website: Basilica of the Sacred Heart of Jesus

History
- Former name: Church of the Sacred Heart of Jesus (1898–2010)
- Status: Minor basilica
- Dedication: Sacred Heart of Jesus
- Dedicated: May 1, 1898

Architecture
- Architect: Walter T. Downing
- Style: French Romanesque; Romanesque Revival
- Years built: 1897–1898
- Groundbreaking: September 1897

Administration
- Province: Ecclesiastical Province of Atlanta
- Archdiocese: Roman Catholic Archdiocese of Atlanta
- Church of the Sacred Heart of Jesus
- U.S. National Register of Historic Places
- Atlanta Landmark Building
- Area: less than one acre
- NRHP reference No.: 76000625

Significant dates
- Added to NRHP: May 13, 1976
- Designated ALB: April 10, 1990

The Basilica of the Sacred Heart of Jesus is a Roman Catholic church in downtown Atlanta, Georgia, United States. The current building, at the intersection of Peachtree Street and Peachtree Center Avenue, was completed in 1898. It was added to the National Register of Historic Places in 1976 and was designated a minor basilica in 2010.

The church traces its origins to 1880, when the parish of Saints Peter and Paul was established to cover the northern part of the city. In 1897, the Marist Fathers took over responsibility for the parish and began constructing the current church, which was designed by Walter T. Downing with elements of French Romanesque and Romanesque Revival architecture. It was dedicated the following year as the Church of the Sacred Heart of Jesus, leading to the new name of the parish. The church saw steady growth during its first few decades and by 1917 was one of the largest parishes operated by the Marists. This group returned operation of the church to the Archdiocese of Atlanta in the 1960s. In the following decades, the area around the church went through a period of decline, and there were concerns that the church would close. However, it continued to operate and saw a growth in its congregation. In 1995, Mother Teresa attended Mass at the church and the building celebrated its 100th anniversary three years later. By 2010, the church had a congregation of about 1,300 families, and it is one of the few buildings constructed around the turn of the 20th century that is still standing in Atlanta.

== History ==
=== Parish of Saints Peter and Paul ===
In the late 1800s, the population of Atlanta increased as the city's development grew northward from its downtown. With this growth came an increased demand from Catholics for a church in the northern part of the city, which at the time was within the parish served by the Church of the Immaculate Conception. On February 28, 1880, Bishop William Hickley Gross of the Diocese of Savannah established a new parish for the area known as the parish of Saints Peter and Paul. This parish, which was carved out of territory that had previously been served by Immaculate Conception, covered all of the city north of Edgewood Avenue, the Georgia Railroad, and the Western and Atlantic Railroad. Soon after its formation, a wooden structure was quickly erected on Marietta Street to serve as the parish's church building. The year of its formation, this parish had about 250 members in its congregation. The parish saw its first baptism on April 6 1880, and later that year the Sisters of Mercy established a parish school that had about 125 students. However, the school closed in 1892 due to financial difficulties.

=== Establishment of Sacred Heart ===
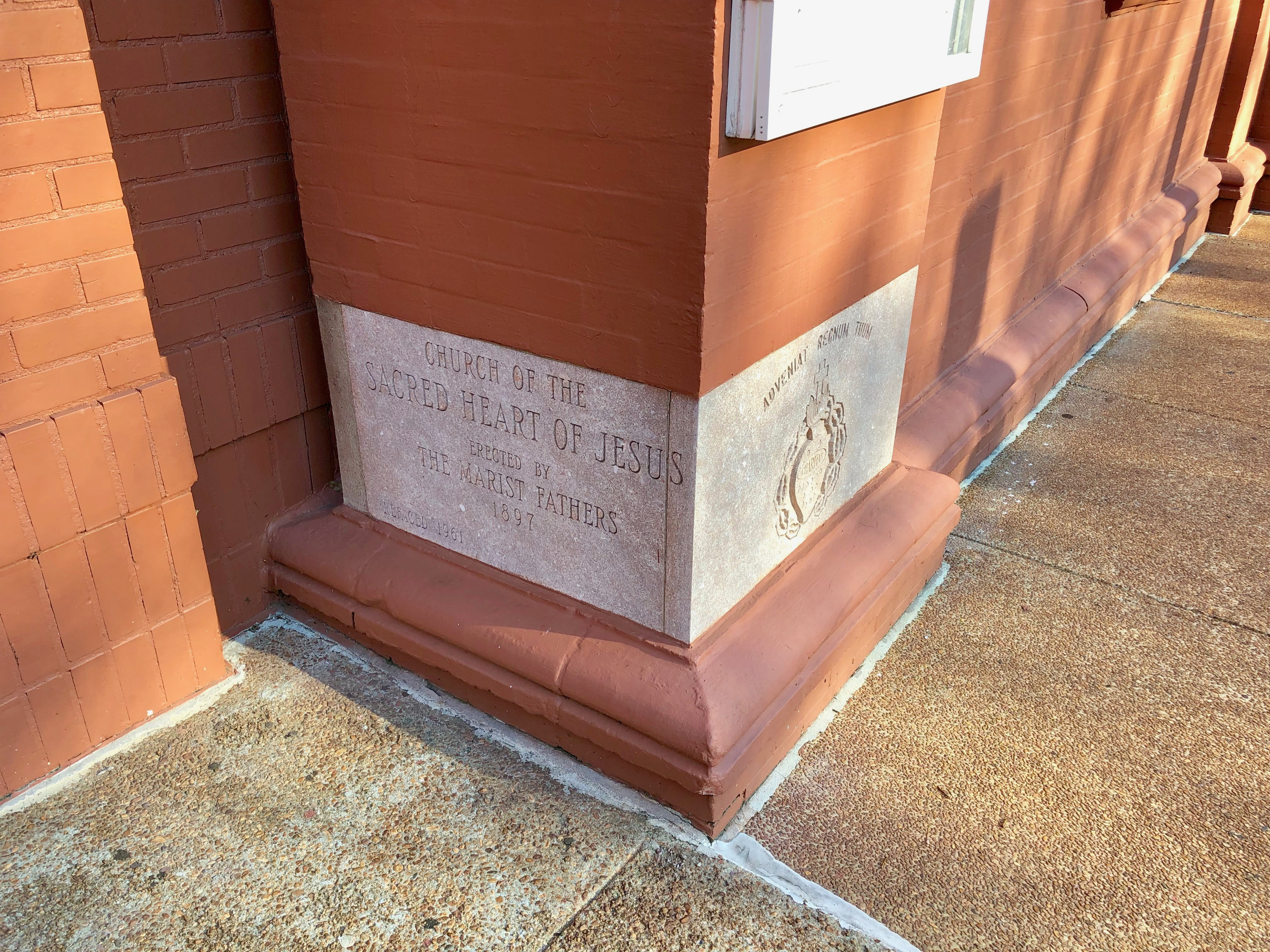
The cornerstone of the new church, which began construction in 1897

In 1897, Bishop Thomas Albert Andrew Becker of Savannah asked the Marist Fathers to help in the diocese's efforts in Atlanta and its missions in north Georgia, a territory that covered approximately 9,500 square miles (25,000 km^{2}). The Marists accepted on May 12 and by the following month had appointed a new pastor for the parish. Upon taking over operations for Saints Peter and Paul, they determined that the current buildings were in poor condition and in an unsuitable location, and they began to plan the construction of a new church. On July 14, they spent $12,000 to purchase land at the corner of Peachtree Street and Ivy Street for this new building, which was to be designed by Walter T. Downing, an Atlanta-based architect. The Marists began a fundraising campaign for the new church and raised $10,851. Construction commenced in September, with Mass continuing to be held in the wooden building until the new building was completed. Work on the new building lasted until 1898, and the cost significantly exceeded the amount that had been raised by the Marists. (Note: Sources differ on the exact cost of the construction. A 1914 book on the history of the Catholic Church in the United States states that the church had cost over $50,000 to erect, while a 1969 book by Atlanta historian Franklin Garrett states that the construction had cost $28,000.) On May 1 1898, the newly completed church building was dedicated by Becker to the Sacred Heart of Jesus, leading to the parish being renamed accordingly. Following this, the old wooden building was abandoned and eventually sold in 1905.

In 1898, the parish had a congregation of about 340 people. That same year, John Edward Gunn became the pastor of the Church of the Sacred Heart of Jesus. During its early years under Gunn, the new church grew at a rapid rate, and by 1910, the church had a congregation of about 1,250 people. The church catered to a primarily Irish Catholic population, which included Maybelle Stephens Mitchell, a noted suffragist who was a member of the church in the early 1900s. In 1905, the church established a Sunday school in its basement, and in 1909, members of the Sisters of St. Joseph opened a parochial school in the parish. Additionally, physical improvements continued to be made to the building, with stained glass windows installed in 1902 and the interior decorated and painted in 1907. In 1911, Gunn left his position as pastor to become the bishop of the Diocese of Natchez, with his ordination to the bishopric taking place at the church on August 29. The following year, Our Lady of Lourdes Catholic Church was established within Sacred Heart's parish territory as the first "non-territorial" Catholic church in the city, with a mission to serve the city's African American population.

In 1913, a new rectory was built for Sacred Heart at a cost of $40,000, and this building was blessed on March 19 of that year. At this time, the congregation stood at about 2,000 members, and the parochial school had an enrollment of 260. Additionally, the Marists had established missions throughout the northern part of the state, primarily in the towns along the several railroad lines that crossed the region. By 1917, Sacred Heart was one of the largest churches operated by the Marists, with ten priests serving a membership of about 2,500 to 3,000 divided between the main church in Atlanta and the several missions that they were operating in north Georgia. On June 9, 1920, the church was formally consecrated by Bishop Edward Patrick Allen of the Diocese of Mobile, becoming the first Catholic church in Atlanta to have such a distinction. In 1924, a dedicated building for the parochial school was built adjacent to the church by the Atlanta-based architectural firm of Pringle and Smith. In 1938, the church's interior underwent a significant renovation project, and following the completion of this project, the building was blessed by Bishop Gerald O'Hara of Savannah-Atlanta (Note: The Diocese of Savannah had become the Diocese of Savannah-Atlanta in 1937 to reflect the growth in the Catholic population of Atlanta.) on September 11.

=== Late 20th century ===
In 1961, the exterior of the church was refaced. Several years later, on September 5 1965, the church returned to the administration of the Archdiocese of Atlanta (Note: In 1956, the Diocese of Atlanta was spun off from the Diocese of Savannah-Atlanta. The Diocese of Atlanta was later elevated to the status of archdiocese in 1962.) as the Marist Fathers refocused their efforts in the city on operating the Our Lady of the Assumption parish. After about a year of negotiations between the Marists and the archdiocese, this transfer was finalized on September 5 1966. On May 13 1976, the church was added to the National Register of Historic Places, a federal list of historic sites in the United States. Through the 1970s and 1980s, the area surrounding the church went through a period of decline, and there were concerns that the church might close. However, the church continued to operate, and it saw several renovation and construction projects during this time, including the completion of a new rectory in 1977 and an extensive interior renovation that commenced in 1978. During this renovation, the church was the target of an arson attack that damaged its basement, but the rest of the church was relatively unharmed, and the damages were repaired shortly thereafter. On April 10, 1990, the government of Atlanta declared the church a Landmark Building, a designation to promote historic preservation in the city. On June 12, 1995, Mother Teresa visited the church during a trip to Atlanta and took Mass while there. Several years later, the church celebrated its 100th anniversary with a Mass on May 3 1998.

=== Elevation to a minor basilica ===
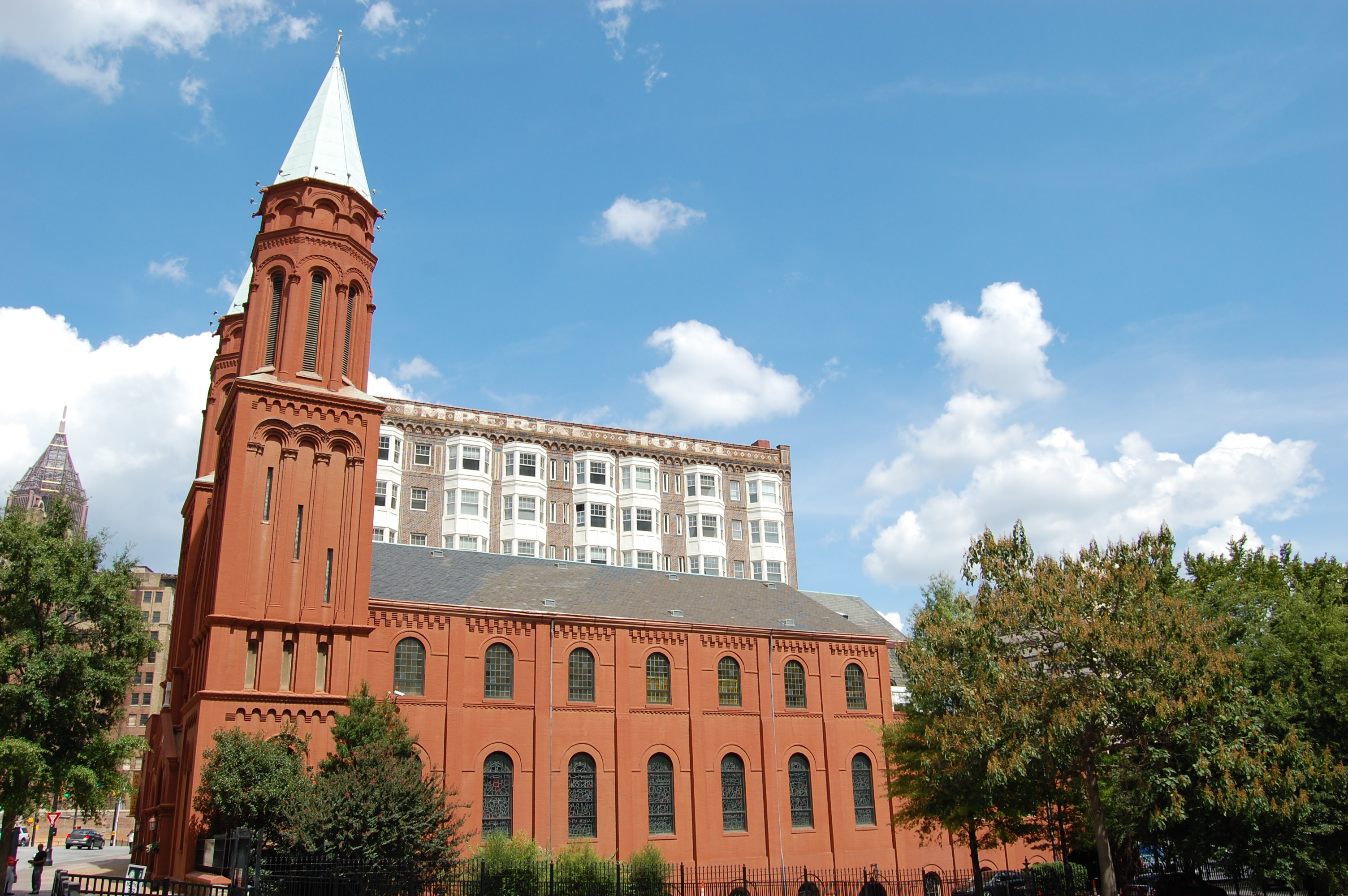
A sideview of the church, 2012

By 2010, the church had seen a large growth in its congregation over the past several years and had a membership of about 1,300 families. (Note: This number of 1,300 is given in a 2010 article in the Georgia Bulletin (the official organ of the Archdiocese of Atlanta) as well as in an article of The Atlanta Journal-Constitution published the same year. Additionally, that Georgia Bulletin article stated that the church had about 700 families roughly five years prior. Meanwhile, a 2006 publication on the history of the Archdiocese of Atlanta gives conflicting information regarding the congregation's size at this time, with the same book stating that the church had either 900 or 1,300 families in its membership.) That same year, the church received the designation of minor basilica from the Dicastery for Divine Worship and the Discipline of the Sacraments, giving the church certain privileges not held by regular churches. The idea for petitioning the organization for this status had been floated about ten years prior by the church's pastor, but no work was carried out for this goal until about 2007. The pastor then made a request to the archbishop of Atlanta, who approved it and forwarded it to the United States Conference of Catholic Bishops, who further forwarded it to the Catholic Church's administration in the Holy See. The title was granted on February 22, making it the 67th basilica in the United States and the first in both the archdiocese and the state. Today, the building is one of the few remaining structures in the area that was built around the turn of the 20th century, and the parish is one of the oldest operating in the archdiocese.

== Architecture and design ==
The church is located at 353 Peachtree Street NE, at the intersection of that road and Peachtree Center Avenue (formerly known as Ivy Street). The building's design has elements of both the French Romanesque and Romanesque Revival styles, with architect Robert Michael Craig calling it "one of the finest Romanesque Revival churches in the South". The main building consists of two stories and has a rectangular layout. Its exterior is primarily of brick and terracotta, with additional ornamentation in marble. The front of the building consists of an arcade featuring three doorways within rounded arch entryways. Above these entryways is a flat facade with a large rose window that includes a design of the Sacred Heart. While the front entrance initially had five granite steps, these were removed in 1912 after Ivy Street was regraded, making them unnecessary. On either side of the front arcade are two octagonal towers measuring 137 feet (42 m) tall, both of which are topped with louvered belfries and pavilion roofs.

The nave of the building consists of high arches leading to the sanctuary, which features a baldachin displaying a crucifix in life-size. The baldachin covers the church tabernacle. Above the tabernacle, in the apse, is a depiction of the Sacred Heart of Jesus. On the arch separating the nave from the sanctuary are five symbols. At the top of the arch is Jesus depicted as the Lamb of God, while other symbols represent the Four Evangelists: a lion (Mark the Evangelist), an eagle (John the Evangelist), a bull (Luke the Evangelist), and a man (Matthew the Apostle). Closer to ground-level, the arch depicts the seal of the Society of Mary and the seal for the Archdiocese. 28 stained glass windows line the nave, all designed by the Mayer Studios in Munich, and it is topped by a gable roof.

== Marist College ==
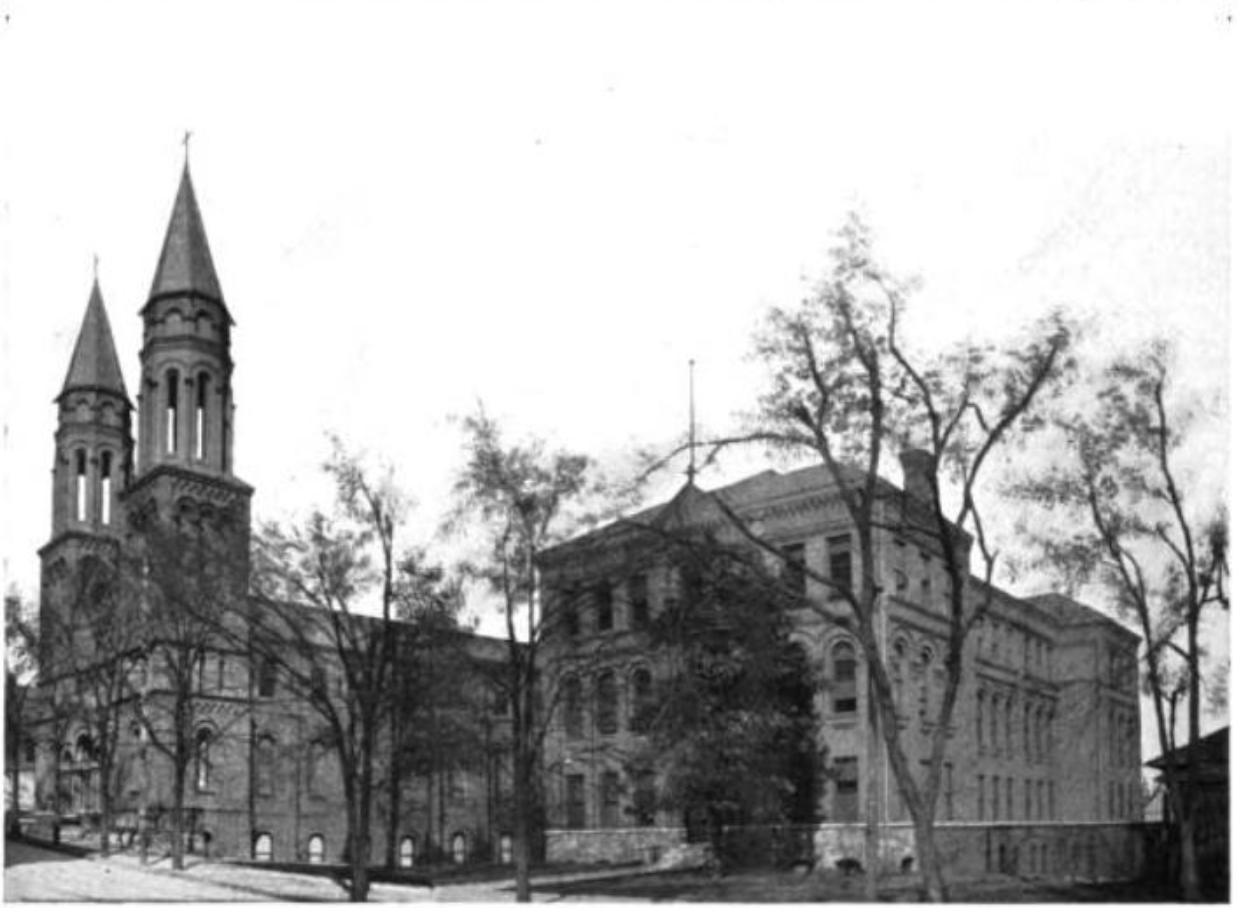
The church and Marist College (right), c. 1914

In 1901, Pastor Gunn purchased land adjacent to the church to serve as the location for a boys' military academy operated by Sacred Heart. Construction on this institution, called Marist College, began in June of that year and it opened on October 2, offering a primarily high school curriculum with several college-level courses. These school's college courses were discontinued around 1905. The school building itself consisted of three stories plus a basement and there was a gymnasium on the school's campus. During the 1907–1908 school year, it had an enrollment of about 127 students. The school saw continued growth during its early years, and in 1914 it had an enrollment of 140. During World War I, 85 percent of the school's alumni who joined the United States Army became commissioned officers. According to a 1917 history book, the school was accredited by the Catholic University of America and the University of the South. That same year, the school established a Reserve Officers' Training Corps program. Between 1922 and 1933, the school operated a summer camp on Lake Rabun in Lakemont, Georgia. By the 1950s, the school had grown to about 225 students, and in 1957, property was purchased north of the city to create a new campus. In 1962, the school relocated to this new location and was renamed Marist School. The building near the church was eventually abandoned in 1976 and was later demolished.

== See also ==
- List of Catholic basilicas
- List of Roman Catholic churches in the Archdiocese of Atlanta

== Sources ==
- Craig, Robert M. (2012). The Architecture of Francis Palmer Smith, Atlanta's Scholar-Architect. Athens, Georgia: University of Georgia Press. ISBN 978-0-8203-2898-0.
- Garrett, Franklin M. (1969). Atlanta and Environs: A Chronicle of Its People and Events, 1880s-1930s. Vol. II. Athens, Georgia: University of Georgia Press. ISBN 978-0-8203-3904-7.
- "Church of the Sacred Heart of Jesus". Government of Atlanta. Archived from the original on October 28, 2020.
- Greenberg, Ronald M.; Marusin, Sarah A., eds. (1976). The National Register of Historic Places. Vol. II. Washington, D.C.: United States Department of the Interior.
- Hanley, John (2006). The Archdiocese of Atlanta: A History. Strasbourg: Éditions du Signe. ISBN 978-2-7468-1773-9.
- Harrison, John M. (October 1944). "The Irish Influence in Early Atlanta". Atlanta Historical Bulletin. VII (29). Atlanta Historical Society: 196–211.
- Hornsby, Alton Jr. (2004). Southerners, Too? Essays on the Black South, 1733–1990. Lanham, Maryland: University Press of America. ISBN 978-0-7618-2872-3.
- Jackson, Marion (February 1927). "The Churches of Atlanta". The City Builder. Atlanta Chamber of Commerce: 6–8, 50–56.
- Keiser, Gretchen (March 4, 2010). "Vatican Names Atlanta's Sacred Heart as Basilica". Georgia Bulletin. Roman Catholic Archdiocese of Atlanta. Archived from the original on October 1, 2022.
- Knight, Lucian Lamar (1917). A Standard History of Georgia and Georgians. Vol. V. Chicago: Lewis Publishing Company.
- Kunkle, Camille (Spring 1989). "Atlanta's Churches in 1896". Atlanta History: A Journal of Georgia and the South. XXXIII (1). Atlanta Historical Society: 35–48.
- Maloney, Walter H. (1992). Our Catholic Roots: Old Churches East of the Mississippi. Drawings by Thomas P. Maloney. Huntington, Indiana: Our Sunday Visitor. ISBN 978-0-87973-463-3.
- Mitchell, Stephens (September 1927). "A Short History of the Parish of the Immaculate Conception". Atlanta Historical Bulletin. I (1). Atlanta Historical Society: 28–46.
- Mitchell, Stephens (May 1950). "Margaret Mitchell and Her People in the Atlanta Area". Atlanta Historical Bulletin. IX (34). Atlanta Historical Society: 5–28.
- Moore, Andrew S. (2007). The South's Tolerable Alien: Roman Catholics in Alabama and Georgia, 1945–1970. Baton Rouge, Louisiana: Louisiana State University Press. ISBN 978-0-8071-3573-0.
- Namorato, Michael V. (1998). The Catholic Church in Mississippi, 1911–1984: A History. Westport, Connecticut: Greenwood Press. ISBN 978-0-313-30719-5.
- National Register of Historic Places, 1966 to 1994: Cumulative List Through January 1, 1994. Washington, D.C.: National Park Service. 1994. ISBN 978-0-89133-254-1.
- O'Hara, Arthur J. (1914). "The Diocese of Savannah". In Lafort, Remigius; Farley, John (eds.). The Catholic Church in the United States of America. Vol. III. New York City: The Catholic Editing Company. pp. 194–214.
- Poole, Shelia M. (March 5, 2010). "Sacred Heart receives basilica designation". The Atlanta Journal-Constitution. Cox Enterprises. ISSN 1539-7459. Archived from the original on October 1, 2022.
- Reed, Richard (February 1927). "Roman Catholics in Atlanta". The City Builder. Atlanta Chamber of Commerce: 10, 46–47.
- "Sacred Heart of Jesus Basilica". Roman Catholic Archdiocese of Atlanta. Archived from the original on December 18, 2022.
- Wirth, Michelle (April 28, 2015). "Atlanta's Spring Street Could Be Renamed Ted Turner Drive". WABE. Archived from the original on October 2, 2022.
