= Hunter Hills =

Neighborhood of Atlanta, Georgia

Coordinates: 33.757614°N 84.430393°W

Hunter Hills is a neighborhood located west of downtown Atlanta, Georgia, United States. Its motto, "One Community, One Family", has been its cornerstone since 2001. The neighborhood is encompassed in the 30314 zip code. Hunter Hills shares borders with Mozley Park, Dixie Hills, and West Lake neighborhoods.

The schools that serve the neighborhood are Stanton Elementary, KIPP WAYS Primary and Academy, and Booker T. Washington High School. City of Refuge, a community-based 501(c)(3) non-profit, was established on the 1300 block of Joseph E. Boone Blvd. in 2003 and helps to bring transformation to individuals and families through services including housing, health and wellness, vocational training, and youth development.

== History ==
During the 1940s and 1950s Hunter Hills came to life as one of the few planned black communities of its time. Hunter Hills was partially responsible for the economic rise in Atlanta after World War II. Its history is shared with other neighboring communities such as Mozley Park, Washington Park, and Dixie Hills, which all were part of the Battle of Ezra Church in 1864. Several black contractors such as Herman Glass developed and purchased land in what is now known as Hunter Hills. Most of the lots were 50 by 150 feet (15 m × 46 m) and they could obtain a loan from First Atlanta National, Citizens or Southern Banks.

Hunter Hills is bounded on the south by MLK and the Seaboard Coast rail-line, on the east by the Beltline (former Louisville and Nashville Railroad) and Mayson Turner Rd., on the north by Joseph Boone St. and on the west by Holly Road. Its West Side Siege Line is located on the corner of Joseph Boone (Simpson Road) and Chappell Road.

McLendon Hospital, which Dr. Frederick Earl McLendon opened in the mid-1940s, was one of two places in Atlanta where Black people could receive medical care.

Hunter Hills is adjacent to the Atlanta University Center Consortium (commonly referred to as the AUC Consortium), which includes Clark Atlanta University, Morehouse College, Spelman College, and Morehouse School of Medicine.

== Notable residents ==
Hunter Hills has also been the past home of several notable figures: Hank Aaron, Ann Nixon Cooper, Tuskegee Airman John Loyd Atkinson Sr., T. M. Alexander, and founder of the Atlanta Daily World newspaper C. A. Scott.
