= Marist School (Brookhaven, Georgia) =

Private Catholic school in Georgia, US

Location
- 3790 Ashford Dunwoody Road NE; Brookhaven, Georgia 30319; United States; 33°54′5″N 84°20′2″W

Information
- Type: Private, day, Catholic, college preparatory
- Motto: Sub Mariae Nomine (Latin); Under the name of Mary (English)
- Religious affiliation: Roman Catholic
- Established: 1901
- President: J. D. Childs
- Principal: Kevin Mullaly
- Teaching staff: 92.3 (on an FTE basis)
- Grades: 7–12
- Gender: Co-educational
- Enrollment: 1,082 (2023–24)
- Student to teacher ratio: 11.7
- Campus type: Suburban
- Colors: Blue and gold
- Slogan: Learn, Lead, Serve
- Athletics: 72 Athletic teams
- Athletics conference: Georgia High School Association (GHSA)
- Nickname: War Eagles
- Accreditation: Cognia
- School fees: Registration: $500; Technology: $550; Books: $500
- Tuition: $23,807
- Affiliation: National Catholic Educational Association
- Website: marist.com

Marist School is a private Catholic school located in Brookhaven, Georgia, United States, north of the city of Atlanta. Founded in 1901, it is operated independently of the Archdiocese of Atlanta.

== History ==
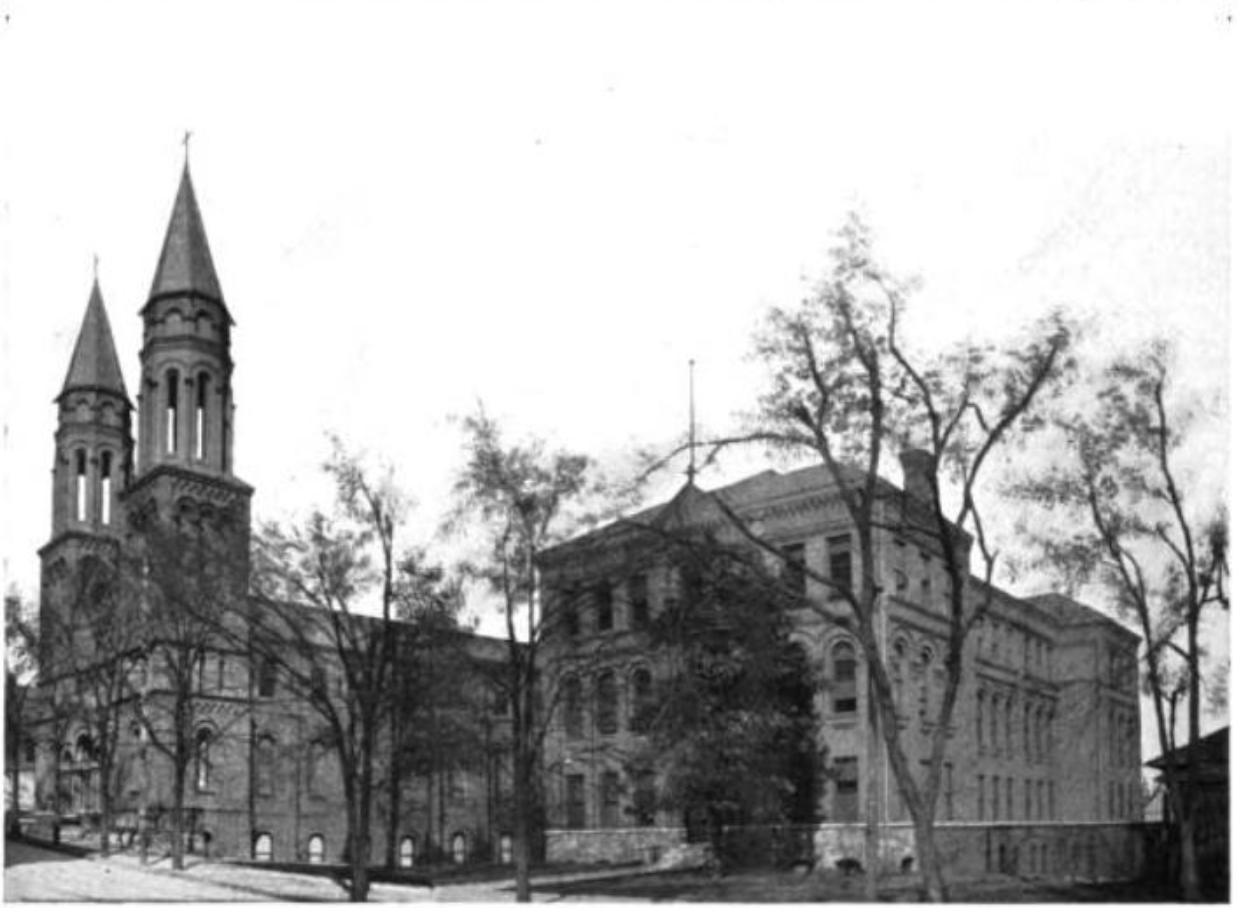
The building next to the Church of the Sacred Heart in downtown, c. 1914

Marist School was originally founded by the Society of Mary (Marists) in 1901, opening its doors on October 2 of that year. The school originated as a boys' military school called Marist College and was located in a three-story schoolhouse on Ivy Street, now Peachtree Center Avenue, in downtown Atlanta. In the 1940s, while it was a military school, the boys wore a blue military uniform with a soft cap, and performed a marching drill routine on the field, which was next to the school and in front of the Sacred Heart Catholic School.

== Notable alumni ==
- Ken Adamson – AFL Football Player, Denver Broncos (Class of 1956)
- Cecil Alexander – Atlanta architect (attended freshman through junior years)
- Paul V. Applegarth – first chief executive officer of Millennium Challenge Corporation (class of 1964)
- Bret Baier – Fox News correspondent, host of Special Report with Bret Baier (class of 1988)
- Marshall Brain – founder of HowStuffWorks
- John T. Butler – President of Boston College
- Christopher M. Carr – Attorney General – State of Georgia (class of 1990)
- Drew Dollar – racing driver in NASCAR and the ARCA Menards Series (class of 2019)
- Andrew Economos – NFL long snapper, Tampa Bay Buccaneers
- Kyle Farmer – Minnesota Twins shortstop
- Sean Guenther – MLB pitcher for the Detroit Tigers
- Kyle Hamilton – Baltimore Ravens safety, Notre Dame Fighting Irish (class of 2019)
- Omari Hardwick – Star of the STARZ hit series Power; former UGA football player
- Kate Harpring - basketball player
- Matt Harpring – NBA player, Utah Jazz
- David Hasselhoff – actor Knight Rider, Baywatch, attended but did not graduate
- Will Heller – NFL tight end, Detroit Lions (class of 1999)
- John Hester – Los Angeles Angels catcher
- Kathleen Hersey – Olympic swimmer; finished 8th in the 200-meter butterfly at the 2008 Olympics in Beijing (class of 2008)
- Kit Hoover – TV personality
- Disco Inferno – WCW wrestler, real name Glenn Gilberti
- Ernie Johnson Jr. – Sportscaster for Turner Sports and host of Inside the NBA for TNT
- Bobby Jones – golf legend, attended but did not graduate
- Chris Krebs – inaugural Director of the Cybersecurity and Infrastructure Security Agency
- Ed Lafitte – MLB pitcher for the Detroit Tigers (1909–1912), Brooklyn Tip-Tops (1914–15), and Buffalo Blues (1915)
- Patrick Mannelly – NFL long snapper, Chicago Bears (class of 1993)
- Peter Marshall – former world record-holding swimmer in 50 and 100 yard backstroke (class of 2000)
- Sean McVay – NFL head coach of the Los Angeles Rams (class of 2004)
- Bert Parks – longtime Host (1955–1979) of annual Miss America telecast
- Bob Olderman – NFL player
- Ryan Roushandel – NASL, Atlanta Silverbacks
- Anderson Russell – NFL player
- Leigh Torrence – NFL defensive back, New Orleans Saints
- Mark Watson – MLB pitcher for the Cleveland Indians (2000), Seattle Mariners (2002), and Cincinnati Reds (2003)
- Rob Woodall – Georgia US House of Representatives (7th District)
- John Fitzpatrick – NFL player

== See also ==
- National Catholic Educational Association
