= Our Lady of Lourdes Catholic Church (Atlanta) =

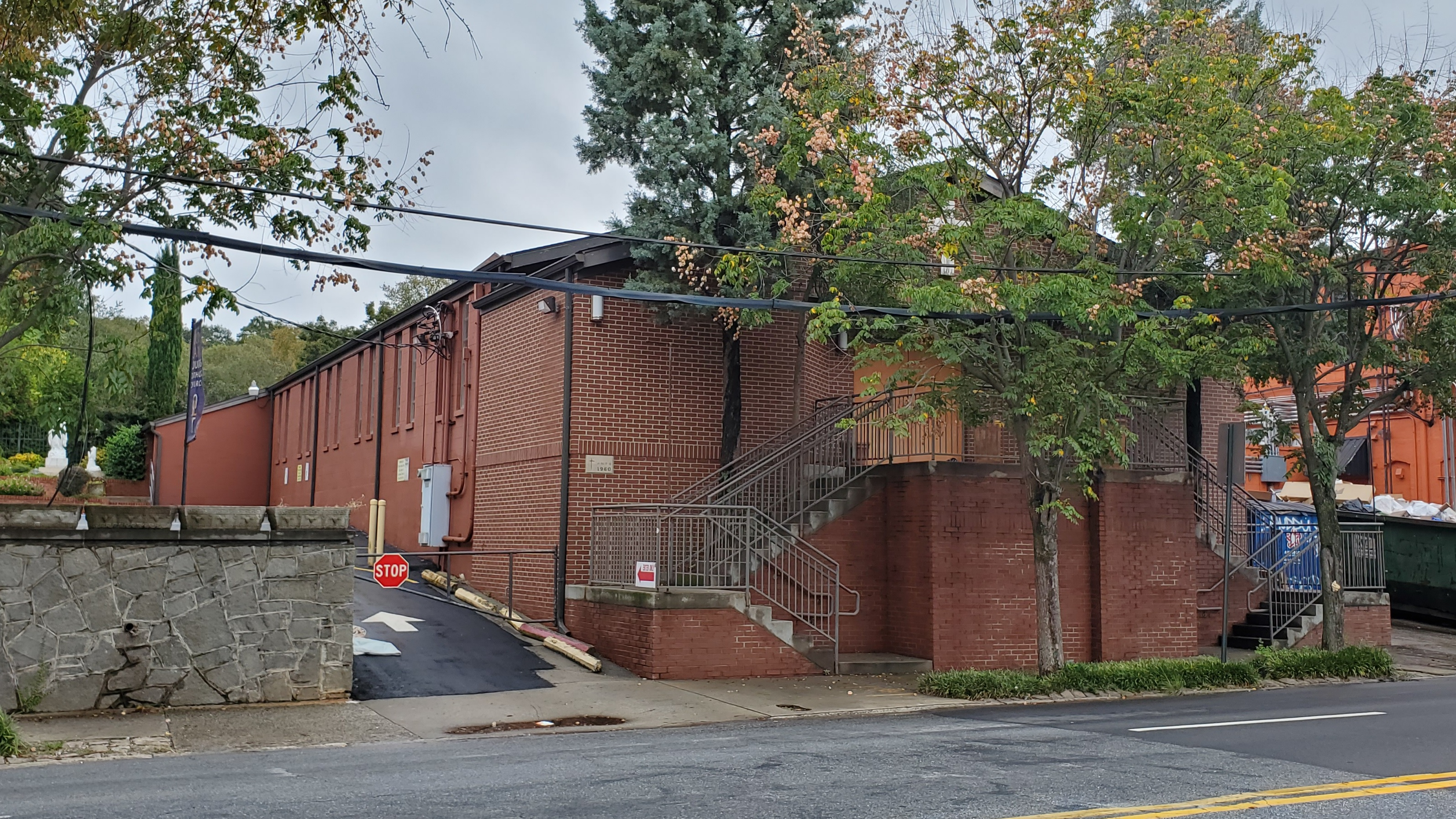
- Our Lady of Lourdes Catholic Church (2020)

- Location within Atlanta Location within Georgia Location within the United States
- 33°45′17″N 84°22′19″W
- Location: Atlanta, Georgia, United States
- Denomination: Catholic Church

History
- Founded: November 1912
- Founder: Ignatius Lissner
- Dedication: Our Lady of Lourdes

Administration
- Province: Ecclesiastical Province of Atlanta
- Archdiocese: Roman Catholic Archdiocese of Atlanta
- Our Lady of Lourdes Catholic Church
- U.S. Historic district – Contributing property
- Part of: Martin Luther King Jr. National Historical Park (ID74000677)
- Added to NRHP: May 2, 1974

Our Lady of Lourdes Catholic Church is a Catholic Church in Atlanta, Georgia, United States. Located in the Sweet Auburn neighborhood, the church was established as a mission in 1912 and is a contributing property of the Martin Luther King Jr. National Historical Park.

== History ==
The church was established in November 1912 by Ignatius Lissner of the Society of African Missions with funding from Katharine Drexel, who had founded the Sisters of the Blessed Sacrament (SBS). The church was located in Sweet Auburn, an African-American neighborhood in Atlanta, and shared a high degree of ecumenism with several Protestant churches in the neighborhood. The church, originally known as Our Lady of Lourdes Colored Mission, was built as a three-story combination church and school, and Lissner served as its first priest. At the time, it was the second Catholic mission intended to serve African Americans in Georgia and the first in Atlanta. The church is located on the same block as the birthplace of Martin Luther King Jr., who as a child would often play on the parish grounds. During the civil rights movement, many church members protested for increased civil rights. The school would remain active until 2001, when it closed due to a lack of funding from the Roman Catholic Archdiocese of Atlanta.

== See also ==
- List of Roman Catholic churches in the Archdiocese of Atlanta
- St. Paul of the Cross Catholic Church - Established from the territory of Our Lady of Lourdes

== Bibliography ==
- "Our Lady of Lourdes Catholic Church: Atlanta's First African-American Catholic Church". Georgia Historical Society. September 16, 2014.
- Moore, Andrew S. (2018). "Black and Catholic in Atlanta: Challenge and Hope". In Cummings, Kathleen Sprows; Matovina, Timothy; Orsi, Robert A. (eds.). Catholics in the Vatican II Era: Local Histories of a Global Event. Cambridge University Press. pp. 135–156. ISBN 978-1-107-14116-2 – via Google Books.
- Presidential Parkway Construction, I-75 to Ponce de Leon, Atlanta: Environmental Impact Statement. 1984 – via Google Books.
