= All Saints Catholic Church (Manassas, Virginia) =

Coordinates: 38°45′13″N 77°29′11″W

- All Saints
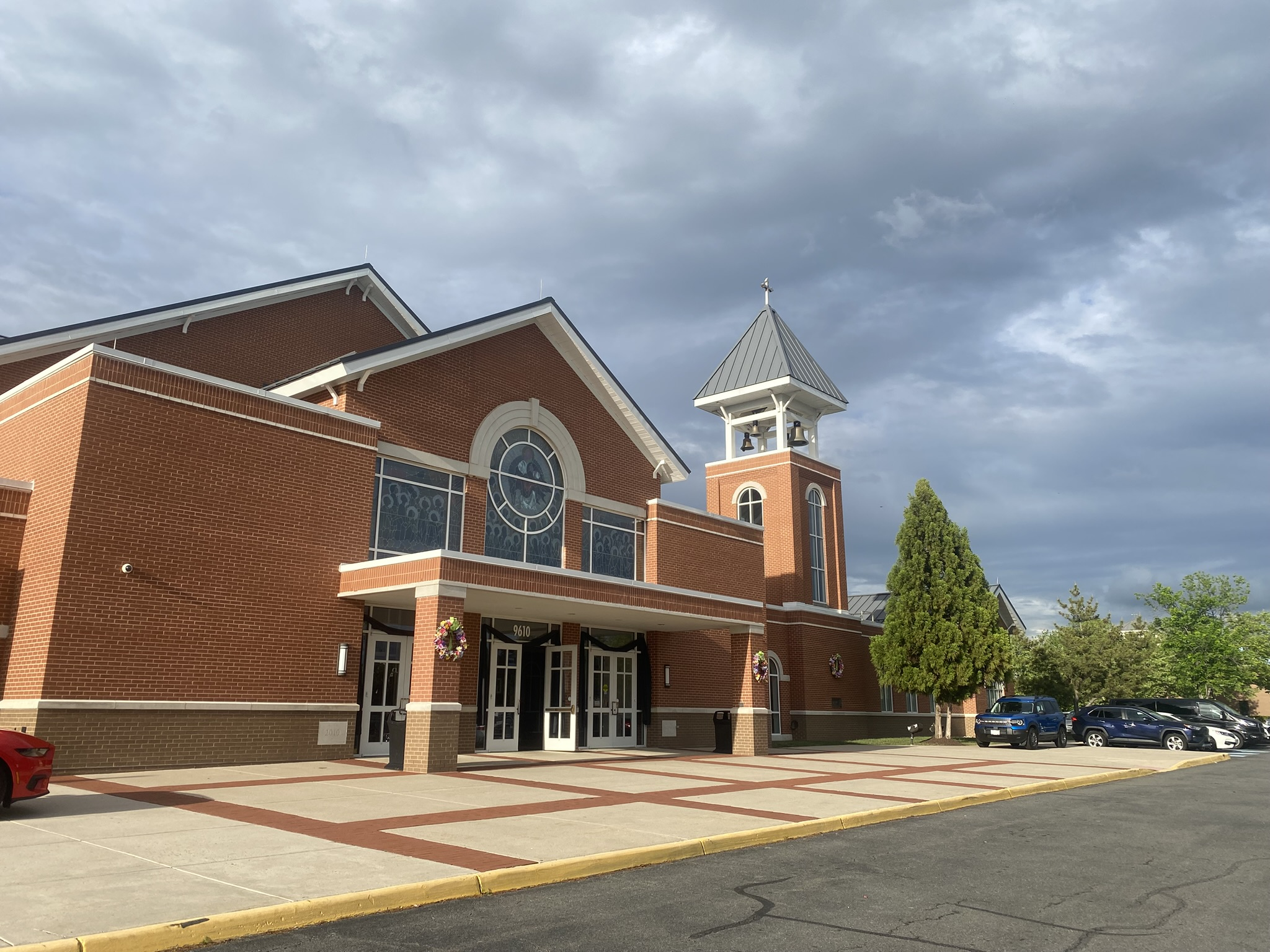
- The outside of the church
- All Saints Catholic Church
- Location: Manassas, Virginia US
- Address: 9300 Stonewall Rd, Manassas, VA 20110
- Country: United States
- Denomination: Catholic Church
- Tradition: Roman Rite
- Website: https://allsaintsva.org/

History
- Founded: August, 1879
- Founder: William Henry Elder

Architecture
- Architectural type: Romanesque Revival
- Completed: November 1, 2008
- Construction cost: $6,000,000 US

Administration
- Diocese: Roman Catholic Diocese of Arlington

Clergy
- Bishop: Michael Francis Burbidge

All Saints Catholic Church is located in Manassas Virginia. It is the largest Catholic Church in terms of parishioners with more than 21,000 registered parishioners; making All Saints the largest Catholic parish in Virginia in terms of number of parishioners.

== Description ==
Since 2008, the church has had a Romanesque Revival façade, it features a bell tower that weighs over 1,000 pounds, which was the original bell used at the first All Saints Catholic Church. The church's current design was designed by Intec Group; it has a seating capacity of over 1,500. It features a large sanctuary with a centrally located tabernacle.

== History ==
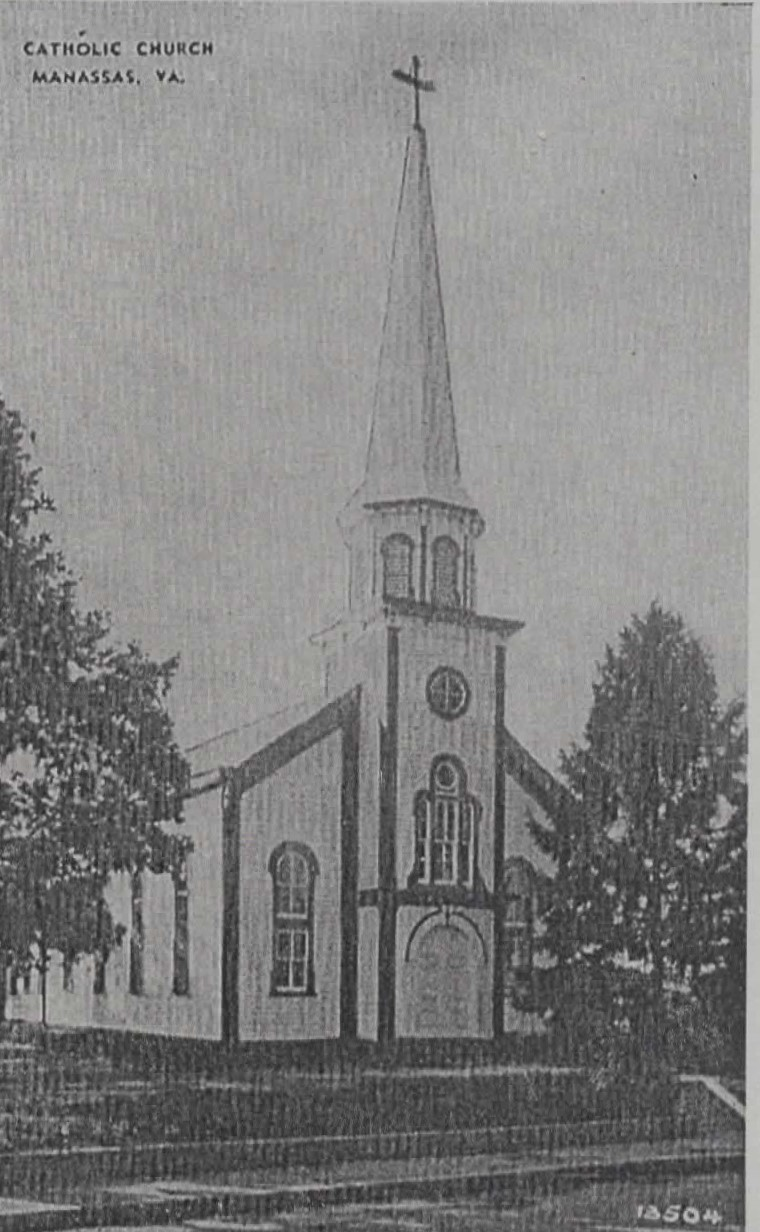
The first All Saints Catholic Church

All Saints Catholic Church was founded in 1879, as a mission church with less than 100 parishioners, its jurisdiction extended north to the Potomac River, east to Woodbridge and Triangle, and west to the Bull Run Mountains.

Bishop William Elder dedicated All Saints Catholic Church in August 1879, the cornerstone was laid on November 29, 1878, which was a relic of the Civil War dug up from the previous Wooden Church foundation; this cornerstone was moved to the chapel in 1974.

All Saints continued later opening a school in 1957, and a new church was built in 1974; this church had a seating capacity of 860, yet it would soon become inadequate for the huge amount of people that would attend each Sunday, as a result of overcrowding they offered nine weekend liturgies, and also two Spanish masses. At the time this was one of the first parish's to offer the liturgy in Spanish.

In 1995, All Saints launched a Building Fund Campaign to raise money for a larger church over ($6,000,000 US) were raised in order to build the current church, the old church would be used as an activity center, though on special occasions such as Ash Wednesday, Palm Sunday, Easter, Christmas and other important Catholic Holidays is used as a Church in order to prevent overcrowding.

This led to the eventual development of nearby parishes: St. Francis of Assisi in Triangle (1947), Our Lady of Angels in Woodbridge (1959), St. Timothy in Centreville (1969), Holy Family in Dale City (1970), and Holy Trinity in Gainesville (2001).

On November 1, 2008, the current church building opened, then bishop Paul S. Loverde attended, while Rev. Robert C. Cilinski, opened the ceremony and thus established the current day church; On September 3, 2017 bishop Michael Francis Burbidge established St. Gabriel's Mission to expand the needs for a Spanish-speaking ministry as a result of All Saints Catholic Church.

== See also ==
- List of churches in the Roman Catholic Diocese of Arlington
