= List of churches in the Diocese of Arlington =

This is a list of current and former Catholic churches in the Diocese of Arlington. The diocese includes approximately 80 churches divided into seven deaneries across the 21 northernmost counties and independent cities within the Commonwealth of Virginia. The cathedral church of the diocese is the Cathedral of St. Thomas More in Arlington.

== Deanery I ==
This deanery contains parishes in Arlington, McLean and Falls Church.

Name	Image	Location	Description/notes
Cathedral of Saint Thomas More		3901 Cathedral Ln, Arlington	Founded in 1938. Cathedral built in 1961
Holy Martyrs of Vietnam		915 S Wakefield St, Arlington	Founded in 1997, church dedicated in 1997. First Vietnamese parish in the United States. Parish also operates Our Lady of La Vang mission church in Chantilly.
Our Lady of Lourdes		830 23rd St, S, Arlington	Founded in 1946, church dedicated in 1964. The parish includes the Pentagon.
Our Lady, Queen of Peace		2700 19th St, S, Arlington	Founded in 1945 as an African-American parish
St. Agnes		2002 N. Randolph St, Arlington	Founded in 1936, church dedicated in 1966
St. Ann		5312 10th St N, Arlington	Founded in 1947, church dedicated in 2005.
St. Charles Borromeo		3304 N. Washington Blvd, Arlington	Founded in 1909. Church built in 1960, renovated in 1990
St. Anthony of Padua		3305 Glen Carlyn Rd, Falls Church	Founded as a mission church in 1930s. Church dedicated in 1970
St. James		103 N. Spring St, Falls Church	Parish established in 1892; Church dedicated in 1903
St. Philip		7500 St. Philips Ct, Falls Church	Founded in 1962, church dedicated in 1967
St. John the Beloved		6426 Linway Ter, McLean	Founded in 1951, church dedicated in 1954
St. Luke		7001 Georgetown Park, McLean	Founded in 1961, church dedicated in 1983

== Deanery II ==
This deanery contains parishes in Alexandria, Annandale and other communities.

Name	Image	Location	Description/notes
Basilica of St. Mary		310 S. Royal St, Alexandria	Founded in 1795, church dedicated in 1827; Gothic Revival architecture
Blessed Sacrament		1427 W. Braddock Rd, Alexandria	Founded in early 1940s. Church dedicated in 1946
Good Shepherd		8710 Mt. Vernon Hwy, Alexandria	Founded in 1965
Queen of Apostles		4401 Sano St, Alexandria	Founded in 1963, church dedicated in 1965
St. Joseph		711 N. Columbus St, Alexandria	Church dedicated in 1916 to serve Alexandria's African-American community
St. Lawrence		6222 Franconia Rd, Alexandria	Founded in 1967, church dedicated in 1970
St. Louis		2907 Popkins Ln, Alexandria	Founded in 1949. Church dedicated in 1962
St. Rita		3815 Russell Rd, Alexandria	Founded in 1914. Church dedicated in 1949
Holy Spirit		8800 Braddock Rd, Annandale	Founded in 1964, church dedicated in 1967
St. Ambrose		3829 Woodburn Rd, Annandale	Founded in 1966. Church dedicated in 1977
St. Michael		7401 St. Michael's Ln, Annandale	Founded in 1953. Church dedicated in 1960
Nativity		6400 Nativity Ln, Burke	Founded in 1973,
St. Bernadette		7600 Old Keene Mill Rd, Springfield	Founded in 1959, church dedicated in 1981
St. Raymond of Peñafort		8750 Pohick Rd, Springfield	Founded in 1997. Church dedicated in 2006

== Deanery III ==
This deanery contains parishes in Reston and other communities.

Name	Image	Location	Description/notes
St. Theresa		21371 St. Theresa Ln, Ashburn	Founded in 1991. Church dedicated in 2009
St. Katharine Drexel		15000 Waterfall Rd, Haymarket	Mission founded in 2005
St. Catherine of Siena		1020 Springvale Rd, Great Falls	
St. Joseph		750 Peachtree St, Herndon	Founded in 1944, church started in 1984
St. John the Apostle		55 Oakcrest Manor Dr. NE, Leesburg	Founded in 1926, church dedicated in 2012. Parish operates the Chapel of the Immaculate Conception in Leesburg
St. Stephen the Martyr		23331 Sam Fred Rd, Middleburg	Founded in 1925, church dedicated in 1963. Weekend parish for US President John F. Kennedy
Our Lady of Hope		46639 Algonkian Pkwy, Potomac Falls	Founded in 2000, church dedicated in 2006
St. Francis de Sales		37730 St. Francis Ct, Purcellville	Founded in 1918, church dedicated in 1992
St. John Neumann		11900 Lawyers Rd, Reston	Founded in 1979. Church dedicated in 1982
St. Thomas a Becket		1421 Wiehle Ave, Reston	Founded in 1970
Corpus Christi		43130 Amberwood Plaza #150, South Riding	Founded in 2014, church dedicated in 2021.
Christ the Redeemer		46833 Harry Byrd Hwy, Sterling	Founded in 1972, church dedicated in 2000

== Deanery IV ==
This deanery contains parishes in the Shenandoah Valley.

Name	Image	Location	Description/notes
Christ the King Chapel		134 Christendom Dr, Front Royal	Chapel located on the campus of Christendom College. Dedicated in 2023.
Our Lady of the Shenandoah Mission		40 Fritzel Way, Basye	Mission church of St. John Bosco; founded in 1974 and dedicated in 1976
St. Bridget of Ireland		1024 W. Main St, Berryville	Founded in 2017, church dedicated in 2002
Precious Blood		114 E. Edmondson St, Culpeper	Founded in 1946, church dedicated in 1983
St. John the Baptist		120 W. Main St, Front Royal	Founded in 1940, church dedicated in 1998
Our Lady of the Valley		200 Collins Ave, Luray	Church dedicated in 1954
Our Lady of the Blue Ridge		Intersection Routes 29 and 629, Madison	Founded in 1977, church dedicated in 1992
St. Isidore the Farmer		14414 St. Isidore Way, Orange	
St. Peter		12762 Lee Hwy, Washington	
Sacred Heart of Jesus		120 Keating Dr, Winchester	Founded in 1870, church dedicated in 1989
St. John Bosco		315 N. Main St, Woodstock	Founded in 1888, church dedicated in 1973

== Deanery V ==
This deanery contains parishes in Manassas and other communities.

Name	Image	Location	Description/notes
Holy Family		14160 Ferndale Rd, Dale City	Founded in 1970, church dedicated in 1974
Holy Trinity		8213 Linton Hall Rd, Gainesville	
St. Elizabeth Ann Seton		12807 Valleywood Dr, Lake Ridge	Founded in 1976, church dedicated in 1994
All Saints		9300 Stonewall Rd, Manassas	Founded in 1879, church built in 2008
Annunciation of the Blessed Virgin Mary		6719 Token Valley Rd, Manassas	Byzantine-Ukrainian Rite. Church built in 1925.
Sacred Heart		12975 Purcell Rd, Manassas	Founded in 1918 by immigrants from Austria and Czechoslovakia
St. Gabriel Mission		9110 Railroad Dr, Manassas Park	Spanish mission, operated by All Saints Church
St. Francis of Assisi		18825 Fuller Heights Rd, Triangle	Founded in 1957 to serve Marine Corps Base Quantico. Church dedicated in 1984
St. John the Evangelist		271 Winchester St, Warrenton	Founded in 1860, church dedicated in 1861,
Our Lady of Angels		13752 Mary's Way, Woodbridge	Founded in 1956, church dedicated in 1958

== Deanery VI ==
This deanery contains parishes in Chantilly, Fairfax, Vienna and Clifton

Name	Image	Location	Description/notes
St. Timothy		13807 Poplar Tree Rd, Chantilly	Founded in 1923, church dedicated in 1975
St. Veronica		3460 Centreville Rd, Chantilly	Founded in 1999, church dedicated in 2005
St. Jude		4219 Lafayette Center Dr, Chantilly	Syro-Malabar mission
St. Andrew the Apostle		6720 Union Mill Rd, Clifton	Founded in 1989, church dedicated in 1993
St. Clare of Assisi		12409 Henderson Rd, Clifton	Founded in 1996
St. Leo the Great		3700 Old Lee Hwy, Fairfax	Founded in 1957, church dedicated in 1966
St. Paul Chung		4712 Rippling Pond Rd, Fairfax	Korean church. Founded in 1996, church dedicated in 1996
St. Robert Bellarmine Chapel		4515 Roberts Rd, Fairfax	Campus ministry at George Mason University
St. Mary of Sorrows		5222 Sideburn Rd, Fairfax Station	Founded in 1858. Church dedicated in 2020. Original church near site of the Second Battle of Bull Run in the American Civil War.
Our Lady of Good Counsel		8601 Wolftrap Rd, Vienna	Founded in 1955, church dedicated in 1973
St. Mark		9970 Vale Rd, Vienna	Founded in 1965, church dedicated in 1984

== Deanery VII ==
This deanery contains parishes in Fredericksburg, Hague and other communities.

Name	Image	Location	Description/notes
St. Elizabeth of Hungary		12 Lossing Ave, Colonial Beach	Founded in 1922. Merged with St. Anthony of Padua.
St. Jude Mission		9600 Caritas St, Fredericksburg	Founded in 2003, church dedicated in 2010.
St. Mary of the Immaculate Conception		1009 Stafford Ave, Fredericksburg	Founded in 1858, church dedicated in 1971
St. Patrick		9149 Elys Ford Rd, Fredericksburg	Church dedicated in 2021. Parish contains site of Battle of Chancellorsville in American Civil War.
St. Paul Mission		7808 Cople Hwy, Hague	Church dedicated in 1965.
St. Francis de Sales		154 E Church St, Kilmarnock	Founded in 1966, church dedicated in 1956
St. Anthony		10299 Millbank Rd, King George	Merged with St. Elizabeth of Hungary.
St. Matthew		8200 Robert E. Lee Dr, Spotsylvania	Church started in 1999.
St. William of York		3130 Jefferson Davis Hwy, Stafford	Founded in 1971, church dedicated in 1956
