= John Richard Keating =

American clergyman

His Excellency, The Most Reverend John Richard Keating
- Bishop of Arlington
- Church: Roman Catholic Church
- See: Diocese of Arlington
- Appointed: June 7, 1983
- Term ended: March 22, 1998
- Predecessor: Thomas Jerome Welsh
- Successor: Paul Loverde

Orders
- Ordination: December 20, 1958 by Martin John O'Connor
- Consecration: August 4, 1983 by Pio Laghi

Personal details
- Born: July 20, 1934 Chicago, Illinois, USA
- Died: March 22, 1998 (aged 63) Rome, Italy
- Buried: Cathedral of Saint Thomas More
- Education: Archbishop Quigley Preparatory Seminary; St. Mary of the Lake Seminary; Pontifical Gregorian University
- Motto: Be rooted in Him

John Richard Keating (July 20, 1934 – March 22, 1998) was an American prelate of the Roman Catholic Church. He served as bishop of the Diocese of Arlington in Virginia from 1983 until his death in 1998.

== Biography ==
=== Early life ===
John Keating was born on July 20, 1934, in Chicago, Illinois, to Robert and Gertrude Keating. He was educated at Queen of All Saints School, Archbishop Quigley Preparatory Seminary in Chicago, and St. Mary of the Lake Seminary in Mundelein, Illinois. Keating continued his studies at the Pontifical Gregorian University in Rome, obtaining a Licentiate of Sacred Theology in 1959.

=== Priesthood ===
On December 20, 1958, Keating was ordained to the priesthood in Rome for the Archdiocese of Chicago by Bishop Martin O'Connor. Following his return to Chicago, Keating served as associate pastor at Our Lady of Mount Carmel Parish until 1960, when Cardinal Albert Meyer sent him back to Rome to study canon law. Keating earned a Doctor of Canon Law degree from the Gregorian University in 1963.

Back in Chicago, Keating served as assistant chancellor of the archdiocese and associate pastor at Immaculate Conception Parish. He was also associate pastor at St. Germaine Parish in Oak Lawn, Illinois (1968–1969), St. Mary Parish in Riverside, Illinois (1969–1970), St. Clement Parish in Chicago (1970–1975), and St. Louise de Marillac Parish in La Grange Park, Illinois (1975–1983).

In 1971, Keating was appointed co-chancellor for priest personnel and a member of the clergy personnel board. He became chairman of this board in 1977. In 1979, Keating was named vicar general and chancellor of the archdiocese. After the death of Cardinal John Cody in April 1982, Keating served as apostolic administrator of Chicago until the appointment of Archbishop Joseph Bernardin.

=== Bishop of Arlington ===
On June 7, 1983, Pope John Paul II appointed Keating as the second bishop of Arlington. He was consecrated on August 4, 1983, at the Cathedral of Saint Thomas More in Arlington, Virginia, by Archbishop Pio Laghi, with Bishops Thomas Murphy and Thomas Welsh serving as co-consecrators. At the beginning of his tenure, the diocese had 188,000 Catholics and 57 parishes; at the time of his death, there were over 336,000 Catholics, 65 parishes, and 5 missions.

Keating issued six pastoral letters and ordained 84 priests. In 1994, he and Bishop Fabian Bruskewitz made national headlines when they insisted on maintaining exclusively male altar servers in their dioceses.

== Death ==
In March 1998, Keating made an ad limina visit to Rome to meet with John Paul II and report on his diocese. He died of a heart attack on March 22, 1998, at the residence of the Oblate Fathers of St. Francis in Rome.

Keating was buried at Columbia Gardens Cemetery in Arlington. He was later entombed at the Cathedral of Saint Thomas More.

Catholic Church titles
Preceded by Thomas Jerome Welsh	Bishop of Arlington; 1983–1998	Succeeded by Paul Loverde
