= Michałowicz =

Michałowicz is a Polish-language patronymic surname derived from the first name Michał, which is the Polish form of "Michael". Notable people with this surname include:

- Karen Michalowicz, American mathematics educator
- Mieczysław Michałowicz (1876–1965), a Polish social and political activist, physician, and professor at Warsaw University
- Mike Michalowicz (born 1970), American author, entrepreneur, and lecturer

== See also ==
- Mihajlović
