= Paul Loverde =

American Catholic prelate (born 1940)

His Excellency, The Most Reverend Paul Stephen Loverde JCL, S.T.L.
- Bishop Emeritus of Arlington
- Church: Catholic Church; Latin Church
- Diocese: Arlington
- Appointed: January 25, 1999
- Installed: March 25, 1999
- Retired: October 4, 2016
- Predecessor: John R. Keating
- Successor: Michael F. Burbidge
- Other post: Bishop Emeritus of Arlington (2016‍–‍present)
- Previous posts: Bishop of Ogdensburg (1993‍–‍1999); Auxiliary Bishop of Hartford (1988‍–‍1993); Titular Bishop of Octabia (1988–1993)

Personal details
- Born: September 3, 1940 (age 86) Framingham, Massachusetts, U.S.
- Education: Saint Bernard Seminary College BA degree (1962); Pontifical Gregorian University, S.T.L. (1966); Catholic University of America JCL (1982)
- Motto: Encourage and teach with patience 2 Timothy 4:2

Ordination history
History
Priestly ordination
- Ordained by: Francis F. Reh
- Date: December 18, 1965
- Place: St. Peter's Basilica, Rome
Episcopal consecration
- Principal consecrator: John F. Whealon
- Co-consecrators: Francis Frederick Reh, Daniel Patrick Reilly
- Date: April 12, 1988
- Place: Cathedral of St. Joseph in Hartford, Archdiocese of Hartford

Styles of Paul Stephen Loverde
- Reference style: His Excellency; The Most Reverend
- Spoken style: Your Excellency
- Religious style: Bishop

Paul Stephen Loverde JCL, S.T.L. (born September 3, 1940) is an American prelate of the Catholic Church. Loverde served as bishop of the Diocese of Arlington in Northern Virginia from 1998 to 2016.

Loverde previously served as bishop of the Diocese of Ogdensburg in Northern New York from 1993 to 1998 and as an auxiliary bishop of the Archdiocese of Hartford in Connecticut from 1988 to 1993.

== Biography ==
=== Early life and education ===
Paul Loverde was born on September 3, 1940, in Framingham, Massachusetts, the son of Paul and Ann Marie (née Conti) Loverde. Loverde attended primary school in Pawcatuck, Connecticut, then went to La Salle Academy in Providence, Rhode Island. Loverde receive a BA degree at Saint Bernard Seminary College in Rochester, New York. He was then sent to Rome to attend the Pontifical Gregorian University, receiving his Licentiate of Sacred Theology there in 1966.

=== Ordination and ministry ===
Loverde was ordained a priest for the Diocese of Norwich on December 18, 1965, in St. Peter's Basilica in Rome by Bishop Francis F. Reh. After completing his studies in Rome in 1966, Loverde returned to Connecticut.

Loverde served assistant pastor at St. Sebastian Parish in Middletown, Connecticut and as a religion teacher at various high schools in the diocese. He also served as campus chaplain at the following institutions of higher learning in Connecticut:

- Wesleyan University in Middletown
- Connecticut College in New London
- Eastern Connecticut State University in Willimantic

Loverde also served as an instructor of canon law at Holy Apostles Seminary in Cromwell, Connecticut. In 1982, he received a Licentiate of Canon Law from the Catholic University of America School of Canon Law in Washington, DC.

=== Auxiliary Bishop of Hartford ===
On February 3, 1988, Pope John Paul II named Loverde as an auxiliary bishop of Hartford and titular bishop of Octabia. He was consecrated on April 12, 1988, by Archbishop John F. Whealon at the Cathedral of St. Joseph in Hartford, Connecticut. Loverde chose as his episcopal motto, "Encourage and Teach with Patience," (2 Timothy 4:2).

=== Bishop of Ogdensburg ===
Coat of arms as bishop of Ogdensburg

On November 11, 1993, John Paul II appointed Loverde as the eleventh bishop of Ogdensburg. He was installed at the Cathedral of St. Mary in Ogdensburg, New York, on January 17, 1994.

While in Ogdensburg, Loverde started vocation and evangelization initiatives. In 1999, he closed Mater Dei College in Oswegatchie, New York. From 1997 to 1999, Loverde was state chaplain of the New York Knights of Columbus.

=== Bishop of Arlington ===
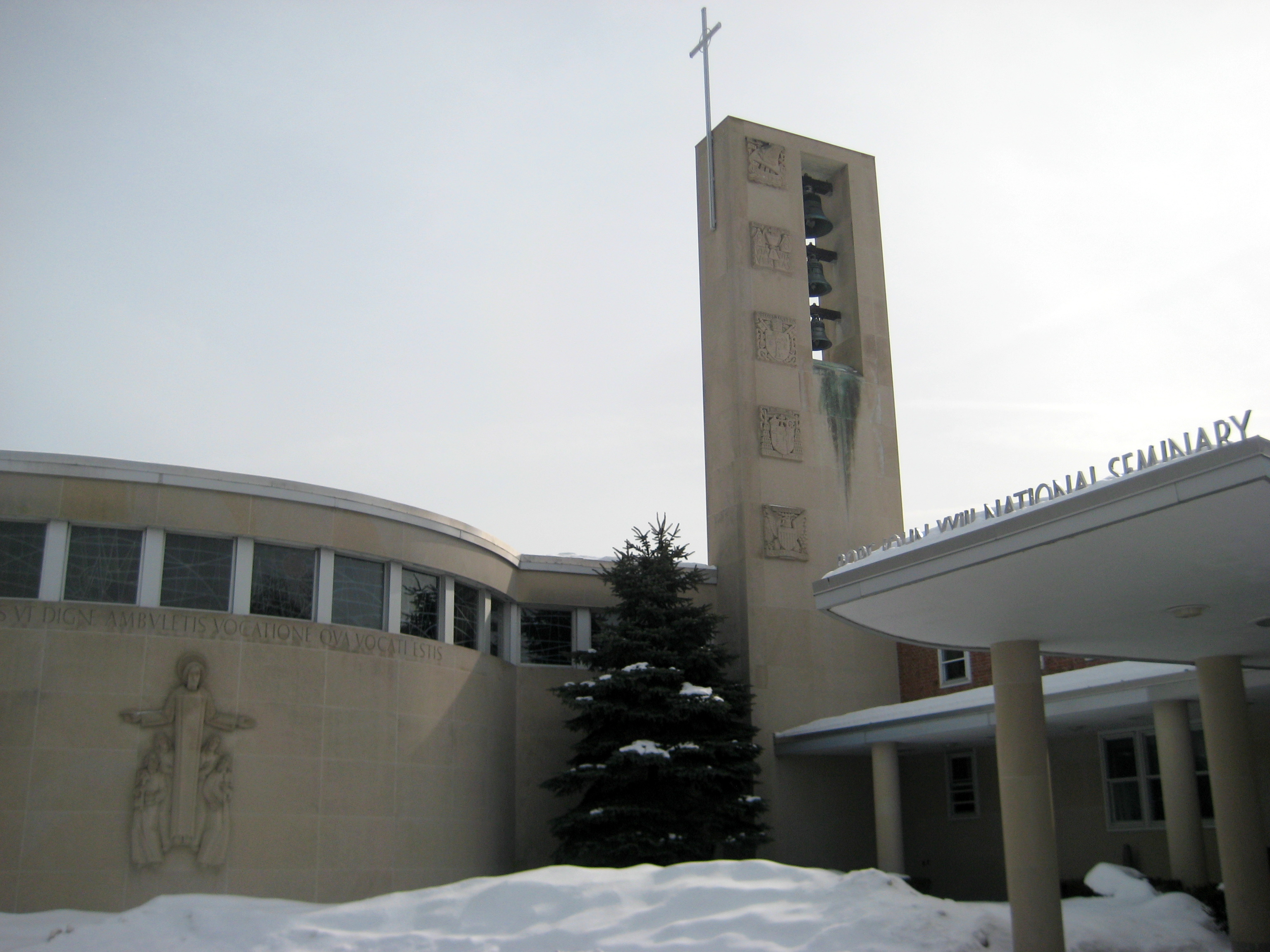
Pope St. John XXIII National Seminary, Weston, Massachusetts (2009)

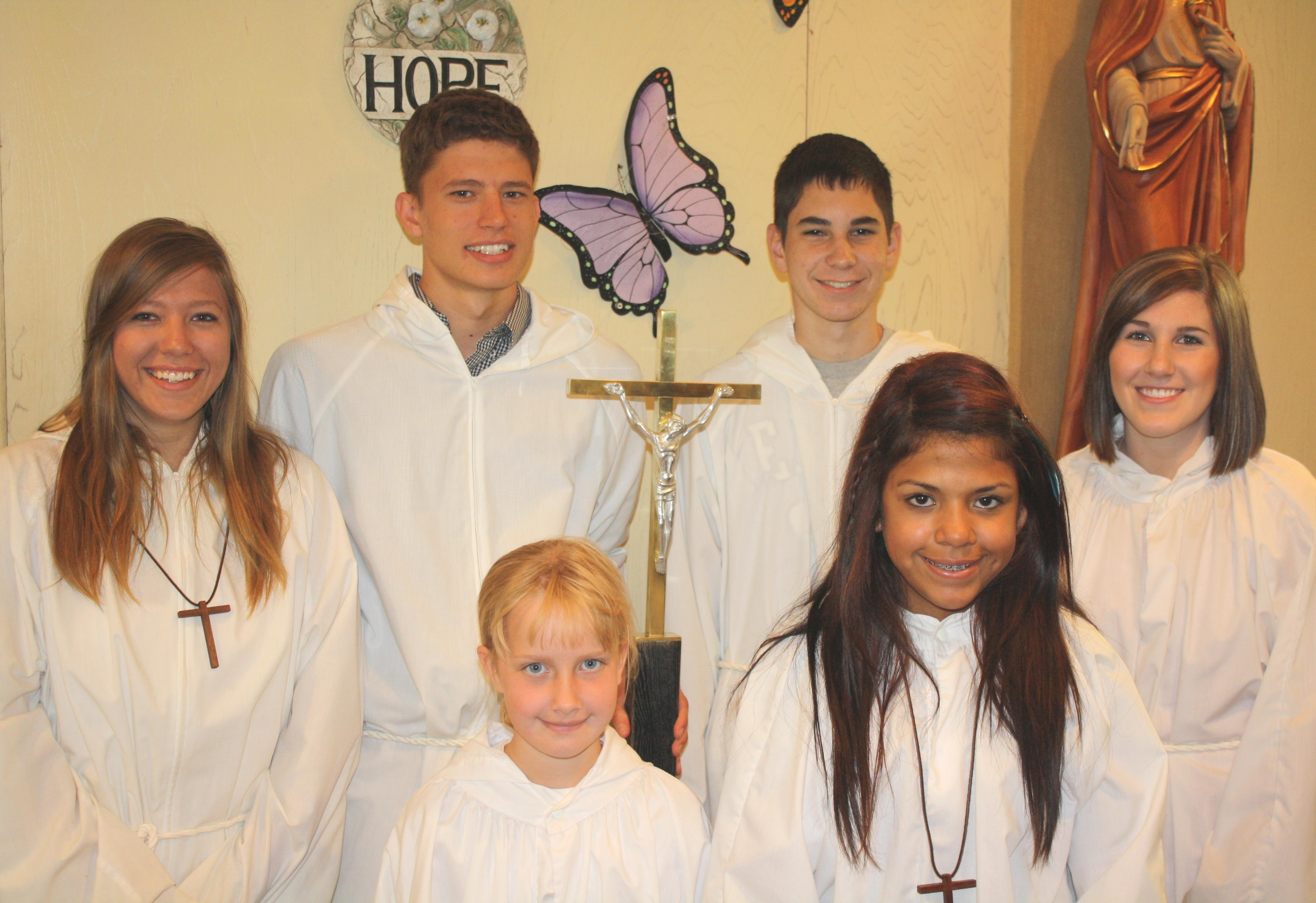
Male and female altar servers (2020)

After the sudden death of Bishop John Keating on March 22, 1998, John Paul II appointed Loverde as the third bishop of Arlington. He was installed on March 25, 1999, at the Cathedral of St. Thomas More in Arlington, Virginia.

In Arlington, Loverde reinstated the permanent diaconate program within the diocese. He also allowed diocesan seminarians to study for the priesthood at Blessed John XXIII National Seminary in Weston, Massachusetts, the Pontifical College Josephinum in Columbus, Ohio, and The Catholic University of America. Loverde persuaded the Franciscan Sisters of the Eucharist and the Cloistered Dominicans to serve within the diocese.

For the United States Conference of Catholic Bishops (USCCB). Loverde served as chair of the Committee on Vocations from 1995 to 1998 and as a member of the Administrative Committee from 2004 to 2008.

In 2004, Loverde charged one of his priests, Reverend James R. Haley, with several offenses at a church tribunal in Pennsylvania. In response, Haley accused Loverde of retaliation because he had exposed serious wrongdoing by three priests in the diocese. One priest had impregnated a man's wife, another embezzled over $320,000 from his church and the third was in possession of gay pornography. Haley also accused Loverde of sheltering gay priests in the diocese. Loverde suspended Haley after he refused to enter treatment.

In March 2006, Loverde announced that he would allow girls to serve at mass in the diocese at the discretion of the local pastors. Prior to 2006, Arlington was one of only two dioceses in the United States to forbid girls from that role.

On June 20, 2012, a Virginia woman sued Loverde, the diocese and other parties. She claimed that Reverend Thomas J. Euteneuer, a priest from the Diocese of Palm Beach, working for an anti-abortion organization in Arlington, had sexually abused her on several occasions in 2008. The plaintiff stated that Euteneuer, under the guise of conducting an exorcism, had kissed and fondled her. The plaintiff claimed that Loverde had given Euteneuer permission to perform exorcisms on other individuals. The woman eventually dropped her claims against Loverde and the diocese, but continued to sue Euteneuer's employer.

=== Board member ===
- Institute for the Psychological Sciences in Arlington
- Catholic University of America
- Catholic Distance University in Charles Town, West Virginia
- Basilica of the National Shrine of the Immaculate Conception in Washington, D.C.,
- Mount St. Mary's University in Emmitsburg, Maryland

=== Awards ===
- Founder's Award from Catholic Distance University (2010)
- Saint Luke Award from Saint Luke Institute (2012).
- Doctor of Humane Letters degree from the Institute for the Psychological Sciences (2012).

=== Retirement ===
Pope Francis accepted Loverde's letter of retirement as bishop of Arlington on October 4, 2016, and appointed Bishop Michael F. Burbidge as his successor.

== See also ==
- Catholic Church in the United States
- Hierarchy of the Catholic Church
- Historical list of the Catholic bishops of the United States
- List of Catholic bishops in the United States
- Lists of popes, patriarchs, primates, archbishops, and bishops

== Episcopal succession ==
Catholic Church titles
Preceded by John R. Keating	Bishop of Arlington; 1999–2016	Succeeded by Michael F. Burbidge
Preceded by Stanislaus J. Brzana	Bishop of Ogdensburg; 1993–1999	Succeeded by Gerald M. Barbarito
Preceded by John Gregory Murray	Auxiliary Bishop of Hartford; 1988–1993	Succeeded by Peter A. Rosazza
Preceded by Josef Vrana	Titular Bishop of Octabia; 1988–1993	Succeeded by Luciano Bergamin, C.R.L.
