= Christianity and transgender people =

Within Christianity there are several views on the issues of gender identity and transgender people. Christian denominations vary in their official position: some explicitly support gender transition, some oppose it, and others are divided or have not taken an official stance. Within any given denomination, individual members may or may not endorse the official views of their church on the topic.

Denominations including the Catholic Church, the Jehovah's Witnesses, and the Southern Baptist Convention have expressed official opposition to gender transition, sometimes citing Biblical references to God creating humans as "male and female". Other denominations, including the Church of England, Church of Sweden, Episcopal Church, Evangelical Lutheran Church in America, and Presbyterian Church (USA), have permitted ordained transgender clergy to serve in congregations.

== History ==
The history of Christianity and homosexuality has traditionally intertwined with the history of Christianity and transgender people, and has been subject to intense debate. The Hebrew Bible and its traditional interpretations in Judaism and Christianity have historically affirmed and endorsed a patriarchal and heteronormative approach towards human sexuality. They favour exclusively penetrative vaginal intercourse between men and women within the boundaries of marriage over all other forms of human sexual activity. This includes autoeroticism, masturbation, oral sex, non-penetrative and non-heterosexual sexual intercourse (all of which have been labeled as "sodomy" by some at various times). They believe and teach that such behaviors are forbidden because they're considered sinful, and further compared to or derived from the behavior of the alleged residents of Sodom and Gomorrah. However, the status of LGBT people in early Christianity is debated.

Some commentators, both Catholic and those of other denominations maintain that the early Christian churches deplored transgender people and same-sex relationships. However, others maintain that they accepted them on the level of their heterosexual counterparts. These disagreements concern the translations of certain terms, or the meaning and context of some biblical passages, including Sodom and Gomorrah, Levitical laws, and other passages.

== Biblical sources ==
=== Surgery and other alterations of the body ===
With respect to gender-affirming surgery, and other alterations of the physical body, the Old Testament has specific rules about men's genitalia being intact: men with damaged testicles or severed genitals are forbidden from being admitted to religious assemblies.

The New Testament is more ambiguous about gender-variant and otherwise altered bodies than the Old Testament. Eunuchs (Greek eunochos, similar to Hebrew saris) are indicated as acceptable candidates for evangelism and baptism, as demonstrated in a story about the conversion of an Ethiopian eunuch. While answering questions about marriage and divorce, Jesus says that "there are eunuchs who have been so from birth, and there are eunuchs who have been made eunuchs by others, and there are eunuchs who have made themselves eunuchs for the sake of the kingdom of heaven." This has sparked discussion about the significance of the selection of the Ethiopian eunuch as being the first Gentile convert to Christianity. Some argue that the inclusion of a eunuch represents a sexual minority similar to some of those who are included under today's category of transgender, in the context of the time.

=== Gender-specific clothing ===
The Old Testament contains prohibitions against men wearing women's clothing and vice versa, which is cited as an abomination within the context of pagan idol worship practices in Deuteronomy 22:5. As a result, it was once considered taboo in Western society for women to wear clothing traditionally associated with men, except in certain circumstances such as cases of necessity (as per St. Thomas Aquinas's guidelines in the Summa Theologica). In the Middle Ages this rule's applicability was occasionally disputed. The Quinisext Council in the 7th century ordered students at the University of Constantinople to stop engaging in transvestism. However, 19th-century biblical scholar Adam Clarke noted: "It is very probable that armour is here intended." referring to Deuteronomy 22:5.

There is debate about whether Jesus abolished the Torah law about clothing. The Bible states that Jesus said, "Do not worry about clothes" in Matthew 6:25, Matthew 6:28, and Luke 12:22. Pauline Christianity teaches that the old covenant legal system was abolished altogether, so it cannot be counted a sin any longer now in the Christian faith. Traditionally Catholicism and Eastern Orthodox Christianity have no commonly known general injunctions against the practice.

== Christian denominational positions ==
=== Catholic Church ===
==== Documents and declarations ====
The Catechism of the Catholic Church does not have any text explicitly regarding transgender people. However, it does clearly state that gender is exclusively binary and every person should "acknowledge and accept his sexual identity". It strongly implies that birth anatomy and gender expression are equal and further emphasizes binary heterosexual marriage and family roles.

Catholic News Service reported that in 2000, the Congregation for the Doctrine of the Faith issued a confidential document stating that sex reassignment surgery does not change a person's gender in the eyes of the Church. "The key point," said the reported document, "is that the transsexual surgical operation is so superficial and external that it does not change the personality. If the person was a male, he remains male. If she was female, she remains female." The document also concluded that a "sex-change" operation could be morally acceptable in certain extreme cases, but that in all cases transgender people cannot validly marry.

On 28 September 2002 the Congregation for the Doctrine of the Faith addressed a letter to the presidents of all episcopal conferences, stating that the gender of a faithful cannot be changed in the baptismal record following gender reassignment, as this does not change the condition of the person concerned under canon law. The letter orders that an annotation should be added to the record, mentioning the decision taken by civil authorities.

In September 2015 the Dicastery upheld the refusal of Rafael Zornoza, Bishop of Cádiz and Ceuta, to permit an openly transgender man to be a godfather to his nephew at a baptism.

In June 2019 the Congregation for Catholic Education published a document titled Male and Female He Created Them, instructing Catholic schools on topics regarding gender identity. The document rejected the terms transgender and intersex, and criticized the idea that people could choose or change their gender. They labeled it as a "confused concept of freedom" and "momentary desires". It asserted male and female genitalia were designed for procreation. Transgender advocates responded that people may discover a gender different than their external appearance, as determined by "genetics, hormones, and brain chemistry". They criticized the document as not reflecting the life experiences of transgender people and worried it would encourage discrimination and self-harm.

On 31 October 2023 a document from the Dicastery for the Doctrine of the Faith – responding to questions from José Negri, Bishop of Santo Amaro – said that transgender people could be baptised, be godparents at a baptism, and be witnesses at weddings, so long as such situations would not cause scandal.

In March 2025 the Vatican published a speech from Víctor Manuel Fernández, chief of the Dicastery for the Doctrine of the Faith. This speech discussed gender-affirming surgeries, and he upheld the Church's opposition to what he said was an idea "that bodily-sexual identity can be the object of radical change, always subject to one's own desires". However, he added: "[T]here are cases outside the norm, such as strong dysphorias that can lead to an unbearable existence or even suicide. These exceptional situations must be evaluated with great care. We don't want to be cruel and say that we don't understand people's conditioning and the deep suffering that exists in some cases of 'dysphoria' that manifests itself even from childhood."

==== Statements by popes ====
Pope Benedict XVI denounced concepts of gender transition, warning that these ideas blur the distinction between male and female and could thus lead to the "self-destruction" of the human species. Benedict also warned against alteration of the word gender: "What is often expressed and understood by the term 'gender' is definitively resolved in the self-emancipation of the human being from creation and the Creator," he warned. "Man wants to create himself, and to decide always and exclusively on his own about what concerns him." He said that this is humanity living "against truth, against the creating Spirit". In December 2012, during his Christmas address to the Roman Curia, he described the view that one can choose their gender identity, as "a profound falsehood".

While denouncing "gender theory" in several public statements, and "[t]he biological and psychical manipulation of sexual difference, which biomedical technology allows us to perceive as completely available to free choice", (Note: Does not explicitly mention gender-affirming surgery.) Pope Francis, head of the Catholic Church from 2013 to 2025, emphasised the need to accompany transgender people.

In Pope Francis: This Economy Kills (2015), a book edited by Andrea Tornielli and Giacomo Galeazzi reporting extensive interviews with Francis, Francis compared "genetic manipulation" and "the [sic] gender theory" to nuclear weapons, calling them "a new sin, that against God the Creator" that "does not recognise the order of creation", whose design "is written in nature".

At a meeting of young people in Naples on 21 March 2015, Francis called gender theory "the mistake of the human mind ... creating so much confusion". At a general audience the following month, he said:

I ask myself, if the so-called gender theory is not, at the same time, an expression of frustration and resignation, which seeks to cancel out sexual difference because it no longer knows how to confront it. Yes, we risk taking a step backwards. The removal of difference in fact creates a problem, not a solution. In order to resolve the problems in their relationships, men and women need to speak to one another more, listen to each other more, get to know one another better, love one another more.

— Pope Francis, General audience, 15 April 2015

During his 2016 pastoral visit to Georgia and Azerbaijan, Francis told a conference of priests and nuns that teaching gender theory in schools was part of a "global war" against marriage. In the press conference aboard the papal flight home on 2 October 2016, he called gender theory "against the realities of nature", warning that schools teaching gender theory "to change people's way of thinking [is] 'ideological colonisation'". Francis also stressed the importance of welcoming and accompanying transgender people.

Speaking on gender theory at an audience on 1 March 2024, Francis said that he had "asked that studies be carried out into this ugly ideology of our times", saying that "cancelling out the differences [between genders] means cancelling our humanity". On 8 April 2024, the Vatican published Dignitas Infinita which condemned "gender theory" and "sex-change" surgery as violations against human dignity. Sister Jeannine Gramick SL, a leading member of New Ways Ministry, wrote a letter to Pope Francis to "tell him about my sadness and my disappointment with the use of the concept, 'gender ideology'"; the Pope replied that

Gender ideology is something other than homosexual or transsexual people. Gender ideology makes everyone equal without respect for personal history. I understand the concern about that paragraph in Dignitas Infinita, but it [sic] refers not to transgender people but to gender ideology, which nullifies differences. Transgender people must be accepted and integrated into society.

In response, Gramick

wrote to our beloved pope again, telling him that, unfortunately in the U.S. (and elsewhere in the world), "gender ideology" has a different meaning. It does not mean nullifying or not respecting differences. Quite the opposite is true: Those who use that term do not consider or respect a person's history and experience of gender. [...] the term "gender ideology" is being used in the opposite way from how Pope Francis understands it[...]

==== Statements by bishops ====
In January 2020 Bishop Paprocki of the Diocese of Springfield released a pastoral guide regarding gender identity. Paprocki's guide stated that "a person cannot change his or her gender" and that sex-reassignment surgery is "a type of mutilation and intrinsically evil". He also refers to transgender surgeries for children as "child abuse and genital mutilation [and emphasized that] it is imperative to be clear on the reality of human biology as a gift from God that we cannot change."

In August 2021 Bishop Burbidge of the Diocese of Arlington released a pastoral letter titled A Catechesis on the Human Person and Gender Ideology. Burbidge's letter calls upon Catholics to show love to transgender people, reminding them of their value and listening to their struggle, while also avoiding showing any "misguided charity and false compassion". He urges Catholics to reject the use of "gender-affirming' terms or pronouns", as it would "be inconsistent" with Church teachings on sex.

In May 2024 Brother Christian Matson of the Diocese of Lexington in Kentucky publicly came out as trans. He believes he is the first openly transgender diocesan hermit in the Catholic Church. The Bishop of Lexington, John Stowe, knew Matson was transgender when he hired him and approved his coming out. He said that his willingness to support Matson comes from the nature of Matson's vocation, as hermits can be male or female and their role is "relatively quiet and secluded", not including priesthood or "sacramental ministry".

On January 28, 2026, a transgender woman named Solange Ayala married a transgender man named Isaías Díaz Núñez in a Catholic ceremony at Our Lady of Pompeii parish in Corrientes, Argentina. The parish priest, Fernando Luis Gómez, reportedly consulted the Archbishop of Corrientes, José Adolfo Larregain, prior to administering the sacrament. Larregain allegedly stated that there was "nothing to object to", as the couple are of opposite genders, as registered on their civil identity documents. The archdiocese denied that Larregain made the statement. On February 8, 2026, the archdiocese released a statement claiming that the wedding did not fulfil canonincal requirements for the valid celebration of marriage as necessary documents, given the complexity of the situation, hadn't been submitted for review to the episcopal curia. Disciplinary canonical measures against the parish are underway, including possible sanctions for Gómez.

=== Independent Catholicism ===
==== Old Catholic Church ====
The Old Catholic Church has been affirming and welcoming to transgender members. Old Catholic and Independent Catholic churches have been accepting of the LGBT community in general. In 2014 one of the first transgender priests was ordained in the Old Catholic Church.

==== Philippine Independent Church ====
Officially known as the Iglesia Filipina Independiente and colloquially called the Aglipayan Church, an Independent Catholic denomination with Anglo-Catholic orientation, the church has adopted an official and binding position of inclusion and full acceptance of LGBT individuals and organizations since 2017 after the question of inclusiveness was raised in an official leadership meeting by a gay member of the church in 2014. Its youth organization wing has also repeatedly elected presidents, vice presidents, and executives who belong to the Filipino LGBT youth sector. On 24 February 2023 the church ordained Wylard "Wowa" Ledama, a trans woman, to the diaconate as the church's first trans clergy in the predominantly conservative country.

=== Protestantism ===
==== Adventism ====
In 2017 the Seventh-day Adventist Church, the largest church within Adventism, issued a statement entitled, "Statement on Transgenderism", which says that "... our gender identity, as designed by God, is determined by our biological sex at birth [and that] the desire to change or live as a person of another gender may result in biblically inappropriate lifestyle choices."

==== Anglican Communion ====
In 2000 the Church of England, an Anglican church, permitted transgender priests to continue serving as pastors. In 2005 Sarah Jones became the first openly transgender person ordained by the Church of England as a priest. Carol Stone was the first transgender priest, having been ordained in 1978 and transitioning in 2000, then continuing her ministry within the church as a woman.

In 2009 a spokesperson for the Church in Wales, an Anglican church, announced that the church affirms transgender people. Transgender people have also gained acceptance in some churches in Africa and Asia. In 2012 the Church of South India opened up the possibility of ordaining transgender priests. In Africa, the Anglican Church of Southern Africa affirmed that transgender people could be "full members".

In 2014 the Anglican church appointed an openly transgender, and lesbian, vicar as a minor canon in Manchester Cathedral. In 2015 the Church of England introduced a proposal to offer naming ceremonies for transgender members. The Diocese of Blackburn in the Church of England has already been using the naming rite. The Secretary General of the Archbishop's Council of the Church of England William Nye said that the Church already has services for people who had been through "a significant personal transition of one kind or another" which could be used to mark gender change. Couples, where one partner is transgender and recognized as having legally transitioned, may marry in Church of England parishes. "Thus clergy in the Church of England ... will not be able to prohibit the use of their church buildings for such marriages." In 2017 the General Synod of the Church of England passed a motion: "... recognizing the need for transgender people to be welcomed and affirmed in their parish church". The Episcopal Church in the United States welcomes transgender members and ordain transgender people in ministry.

==== Baptists ====
The Southern Baptist Convention has also frequently voiced opposition to the idea of gender transition, and to gender-related alteration of one's body, including surgery and use of hormone therapy. In 2014 the Southern Baptist Convention approved a resolution at its annual meeting stating that "God's design was the creation of two distinct and complementary sexes, male and female [and that] gender identity is determined by biological sex, not by one's self-perception." Furthermore, the resolution opposes hormone therapy, transition-related procedures, and anything else that would "alter one's bodily identity". The resolution further opposes government efforts to "validate transgender identity as morally praiseworthy". Instead, the resolution asks transgender people to "trust in Christ and to experience renewal in the Gospel".

In 2014 the Calvary Baptist Church in Washington D.C. ordained the first known and openly transgender minister within a Baptist church. Calvary Baptist is affiliated with the American Baptist Churches USA, Cooperative Baptist Fellowship, and Alliance of Baptists.

In 2017 the Council on Biblical Manhood and Womanhood, an evangelical Christian organization that promotes a complementarian view of gender roles and rejects LGBTQ identities, released a manifesto on gender and sexuality known as the Nashville Statement. The statement includes fourteen points of belief and was signed by 150 evangelical leaders. The statement was controversial, with some evangelicals and other Christian organizations, as well as LGBTQ rights groups, voicing opposition.

==== Calvinist/Reformed ====
===== Congregationalism =====
The United Church of Christ General Synod called for full inclusion of transgender persons in 2003. The Council of Conference Ministers, the Officers of the United Church of Christ, and the UCC Open and Affirming Coalition wrote a pastoral letter addressing the attacks on people of transgender or nonbinary experience across the United States in 2022. On November 12, 2025, nine heads of diverse religious traditions, including the United Church of Christ, issued a landmark statement proclaiming that transgender, intersex, and nonbinary people are worthy of love, support, and protection.

==== Eastern Protestant ====
The Mar Thoma Syrian Church is a Reformed Orthodox denomination in India which is a full communion partner of the Anglican Communion. The Mar Thoma Church has affirmed societal support for the inclusion and acceptance of third gender persons. In 2019 the church announced that it supports transgender people and that it believes the Bible makes several references to transgender people. The church also started a program to provide financial assistance to transgender persons in need of sex reassignment surgery.

==== Lutheran ====
In 2006 the Church of Sweden, the national Lutheran church in Full Communion with the Church of England through the Porvoo Communion, voted to ordain transgender priests. The Evangelical Lutheran Church in America allows transgender members and transgender clergy.

==== Methodism ====
In 2008 the United Methodist Church Judicial Council ruled that transgender pastor Drew Phoenix could keep his position. At the UMC General Conference the same year, several petitions that would have forbidden transgender clergy and added anti-transgender language to the Book of Discipline were rejected. In 2017 M Barclay became the first openly non-binary trans person to be commissioned as a Deacon in the United Methodist Church. Other mainline Protestant denominations that welcome transgender members and ordain transgender people in ministry are the Episcopal Church, United Church of Christ, Evangelical Lutheran Church in America, and the Presbyterian Church (USA).

=== Unitarianism ===
The Unitarian Universalist Association (UUA), a mainline and historically Christian Non-Trinitarian denomination, has been supportive of transgender people. Although they are no longer exclusively Christian, they officially welcome transgender members and ministers. In 2017 the Unitarian Universalist Association's General Assembly voted to create inclusive wordings for non-binary, genderqueer, gender fluid, agender, intersex, two-spirit, and polygender people. The church has replaced the phrase "men and women" with the word people. Of the six sources of the living tradition, the second source of faith, as documented in the bylaws of the denomination, now includes "Words and deeds of prophetic people which challenge us to confront powers and structures of evil with justice, compassion, and the transforming power of love".

=== Jehovah's Witnesses ===
Jehovah's Witnesses believe that transgender people should live as the gender they were assigned at birth and view gender-affirming surgery as mutilation.

=== Mormons ===
The Church of Jesus Christ of Latter-day Saints does not hold an official position on the cause of people having transgender feelings, but holds that the meaning of gender is "biological sex at birth", and members are to focus on "acknowledging their feelings and experiences", meeting them "with Christlike love and understanding". It also imposes "some membership restrictions" on those who choose to "medically, surgically, or socially transition" while "other church participation" is welcomed.

== Denominations that allow transgender clergy ==
- Alliance of Baptists
- American Baptist Churches USA
- Anglican Church of Australia
- Anglican Church of Canada
- Anglican Church of Southern Africa
- Baptist World Alliance
- Christian Church (Disciples of Christ)
- Church in Wales
- Church of Denmark
- Church of England
- Church of Norway
- Church of South India
- Church of Sweden
- Cooperative Baptist Fellowship
- Episcopal Church
- Evangelical Lutheran Church in America
- Evangelical Lutheran Church in Canada
- Evangelical Church in Germany
- Evangelical Church of India
- Evangelical Lutheran Church of Finland
- Mar Thoma Syrian Church
- Methodist Church of Great Britain
- Methodist Church of New Zealand
- Old Catholic Church
- Presbyterian Church (USA)
- Unitarian and Free Christian Churches
- Unitarian Universalist Association
- Uniting Church in Australia
- United Church of Canada
- United Church of Christ
- United Methodist Church
- Uniting Reformed Church in Southern Africa (Southern Synod)
- Scottish Episcopal Church

== See also ==
- Michael Banner – English theologian (b. 1961)
