= Karen Michalowicz =

American mathematics teacher

Karen Dee Ann Shuman Michalowicz (died 2006) was an American middle school mathematics teacher. She was known for her advocacy of incorporating the history of mathematics, women in mathematics, and ethnomathematics into mathematics education as a way to encourage greater diversity and inclusion in mathematics, and for her collection of old textbooks, including works by Nicolo Tartaglia, Georg Sabinus, and Christopher Clavius published in the 16th century.

== Education and career ==
Karen Shuman was born in Fort Wayne, Indiana, the daughter of a United States Marine Corps serviceman. She was educated in Falls Church, Virginia, Jakarta, Indonesia, and a Catholic high school in Alexandria, Virginia. She received her bachelor's degree from the Catholic University of America, and a master's degree from the University of Virginia.

She worked as a middle school mathematics teacher in McLean, Virginia "for nearly 40 years", known as "Ms. Mikey" to her students. She chaired the upper school mathematics department at The Langley School, a private school in McLean. She also held an adjunct professorship at George Mason University, served on the board of Mathcounts, was a member of the National Commission on Mathematics Instruction of the National Research Council, served as an editor for the Mathematical Association of America journal Convergence, and co-directed a National Science Foundation project, "Historical Modules for the Teaching and Learning of Mathematics".

Her students at The Langley School included Nathan Curtis, who went on to receive silver and gold medals in the 1996 and 1997 International Mathematical Olympiad and who credited Michalowicz with sparking his interest in mathematics.

== Personal life ==
She married Joseph Michalowicz on June 8, 1963; they had two children. They divorced but she kept his name. She settled in Falls Church, where she was a parishioner of Saint Anthony of Padua Falls Church, a local Catholic church.

She died of bone marrow cancer on July 17, 2006.

== Recognition and legacy ==
Michalowicz was a 1990 recipient of the Presidential Award for Excellence in Mathematics and Science Teaching. She was also named State Teacher of the Year for Virginia by the American Association of University Women, and teacher of the year by the Virginia Council of Teachers of Mathematics.

Her book collection is held in the library of American University. The Virginia Council of Teachers of Mathematics offers a grant named for Michalowicz for travel to conferences of the National Council of Teachers of Mathematics.
