= Catholic International University =

American online Catholic university

Coordinates: 39°17′14.4″N 77°51′33.1″W

- Other name: CatholicIU
- Former names: Catholic Distance University, Catholic Home Study Institute
- Motto: Gaudium de veritate
- Motto in English: Joy from the Truth
- Type: Private online university
- Established: 1983; 43 years ago
- Religious affiliation: Roman Catholic
- Chancellor: Archbishop Timothy Broglio
- President: Maria Sophia Aguirre
- Provost: Roberto Dandi (interim)
- Students: 171 (fall 2023)
- Location: Charles Town, West Virginia, United States
- Campus: Online
- Website: catholiciu.edu

Catholic International University is a private online Roman Catholic university based in Charles Town, West Virginia. A number of Catholic dioceses partner with CatholicIU to educate those serving in parish ministry.

== History ==
Catholic International University was established in 1983 in the Arlington diocese by Bishop Thomas Jerome Welsh. In 2015, the university relocated its headquarters to Charles Town, West Virginia, as part of its strategic vision. Catholic International is recognized as authentically Catholic by the Cardinal Newman Society and offers bachelor's and master's degree programs as well as an early college program. In fall 2023, the university began offering an AA degree in Liberal Arts taught completely in Spanish. As of Fall 2023, CatholicIU is the only emerging Hispanic-serving institution of higher education in the state of West Virginia. The university's programs are offered completely online; CatholicIU offered its first online program in 2000. According to Georgetown University's Center for Applied Research in the Apostolate, in the academic year 2007–2008, CatholicIU was the top Lay Ecclesial Ministry Program by number of enrollments.

In January 2024, the university changed its name to Catholic International University to reflect its goal of expanding its reach beyond the United States, particularly to Latin America and Italy.

=== Presidents ===
In 2003, Paul Loverde became the university president as Thomas Jerome Welsh, the university's founder, became president emeritus. Loverde was succeeded by Marianne Evans Mount in 2008.

- Thomas Jerome Welsh (1986–2003)
- Paul Loverde (2003–2008)
- Marianne Evans Mount: (2008 – June 30, 2023)
- Maria Sophia Aguirre (July 1, 2023–Present)

== Academics ==
Catholic International University currently offers the Associate of Arts, Bachelor of Arts, and Master of Arts. It also offers undergraduate and graduate certificates and non-degree programs. All of the degree and certificate programs focus on theology, liberal arts, business, emerging technologies, Catholic social teaching, and related subjects.

The West Virginia Higher Education Policy Commission authorized Catholic International University to operate as a degree-granting institution of higher education in West Virginia. It is accredited by the Higher Learning Commission with its Graduate School of Theology accredited by the Association of Theological Schools. In March 2015 the university was also approved for membership in the International Federation of Catholic Universities on the recommendation of Catholic University of America and Australian Catholic University.
