= St. Mary of the Immaculate Conception Roman Catholic Church (Fredericksburg, Virginia) =

Church in Virginia, United States

Coordinates: 38.29683°N 77.47661°W

Saint Mary of the Immaculate Conception Church, Fredericksburg, Virginia

St. Mary of the Immaculate Conception Roman Catholic Church is located in Fredericksburg, Virginia and is part of the Roman Catholic Diocese of Arlington. Its grade school is Holy Cross Academy.

== History ==
The original St. Mary on Princess Anne Street was established in 1858 as the Fredericksburg Mission, served by priests from the original cathedral in Richmond. During the American Civil War, the building was used as a hospital and storehouse. In 1871, the church received its first resident pastor. This original church was used until 1970, then sold to Fredericksburg Church of the Nazarene. As of 2006, the building houses law offices and apartments.

The current church is on the corner of Stafford Avenue and William Street and was dedicated in 1971. The parish remained part of the Diocese of Richmond until the creation of the Diocese of Arlington in 1974. The current church added a rectory in 1974 and a Parish Activities Center in 1976.
