= Thomas J. Euteneuer =

American priest (born 1962)

Thomas J. Euteneuer (born 1962 in Detroit, Michigan) is a priest of the Roman Catholic Diocese of Palm Beach, and an anti-abortion activist. He was president of Human Life International from 2000 to 2010.

== Life and career ==
Thomas Euteneuer was born in Detroit, Michigan, in 1962, the fourth of seven children born to Joseph and Mariann Euteneuer. He earned a bachelor's degree in philosophy from the University of Notre Dame as well as a Licentiate of Sacred Theology degree in Biblical theology from the Pontifical Gregorian University. He is fluent in Spanish.

After his ordination in 1988, Euteneuer served as a parish priest in five parishes of the Diocese of Palm Beach, Florida, secretary to the diocesan bishop, director of vocations, and spiritual moderator for the diocesan Respect Life Office. His anti-abortion activity began in the early years of his priesthood with prayer vigils, pilgrimages, pickets at abortion clinics, sidewalk counseling and the establishment of a crisis pregnancy center across the street from an abortion clinic in 1999, which became the subject of an HBO documentary in 2010.

In December 2000, he became president of the anti-abortion organization Human Life International (HLI). In that capacity, he made many appearances on EWTN and other local, national and international media. He was featured in the newspapers Human Events and National Catholic Register. In 2005 he was awarded the John O'Connor Award for Life by the Catholic lay group Legatus.

In those years Euteneuer was also called upon to serve as an exorcist; he wrote a book on the subject and became known for his talks about exorcism.

In 2007, Euteneuer appeared on the Fox News Channel program Hannity & Colmes, to respond to a statement by host Sean Hannity, then a Catholic, against Church teaching on contraception. He wrote two columns about the controversy.

=== Resignation from HLI ===
In August 2010, Euteneuer resigned from HLI at the request of his bishop. On January 31, 2011, Euteneuer issued a statement disclosing that he had "violat[ed] the boundaries of chastity with an adult female who was under my spiritual care," and expressing regret. Euteneuer emphasized that the violation had nothing to do with his position in Human Life International but "were related exclusively to my own decisions and conduct within the ministry of exorcism that I carried out independently from my responsibilities at HLI."

In June 2012, the Associated Press reported that a woman had filed a lawsuit against the Roman Catholic Diocese of Arlington (Virginia), that diocese's bishop, and HLI accusing Euteneuer of sexual abuse during the performance of an exorcism. He was never a priest of the Diocese of Arlington. He was not named in the lawsuit since he and the woman had already reached a financial settlement. In 2014, a judge dismissed three of four of the suit's claims of legal wrongdoing against HLI.

== Published works ==
- Exorcism and the Church Militant (2010)
- Demonic Abortion (2010)
