= Michael Francis Burbidge =

American Catholic prelate (born 1957)

His Excellency, The Most Reverend Michael Francis Burbidge
- Bishop of Arlington
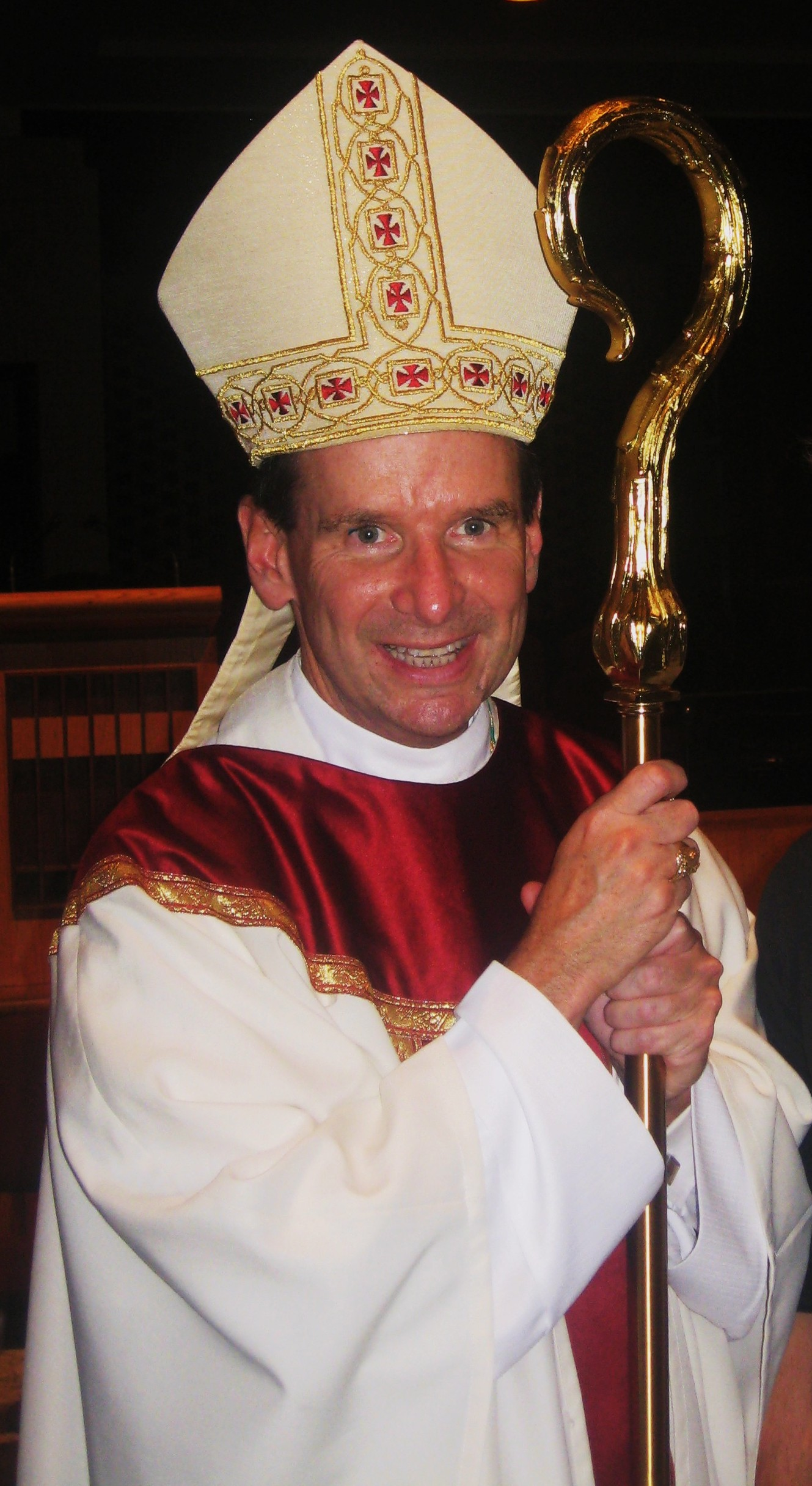
- Burbidge in 2010
- Church: Catholic; Latin Church
- Diocese: Arlington
- Appointed: October 4, 2016
- Installed: December 6, 2016
- Predecessor: Paul S. Loverde
- Previous posts: Auxiliary Bishop of Philadelphia (2002‍–‍2006); Titular Bishop of Cluain Iraird (2002‍–‍2006); Bishop of Raleigh (2006‍–‍2016); Chairman, USCCB Communications Committee (2018‍–‍2021); Chairman, USCCB Pro-Life Activities Committee (2022–2024)

Orders
- Ordination: May 19, 1984 by John Krol
- Consecration: September 5, 2002 by Anthony Bevilacqua; Edward Cullen (co-consecrator); Robert Maginnis (co-consecrator)

Personal details
- Born: June 16, 1957 (age 69) Philadelphia, Pennsylvania, U.S.
- Education: St. Charles Borromeo Seminary; Villanova University; Immaculata University
- Motto: Walk humbly with your God
- Styles
- Reference style: His Excellency; The Most Reverend
- Spoken style: Your Excellency
- Religious style: Bishop

Michael Francis Burbidge (born June 16, 1957) is an American Catholic prelate who serves as bishop of Arlington in Virginia. He previously served as an auxiliary bishop of the Archdiocese of Philadelphia in Pennsylvania from 2002 to 2006 and as bishop of Raleigh in North Carolina from 2006 to 2016. He served as chair of the Pro-Life Activities for the U.S. Conference of Catholic Bishops (USCCB) from 2022 to 2024.

== Biography ==
=== Early life and education ===
Burbidge was born on June 16, 1957, in Philadelphia, Pennsylvania, to Francis and Shirley (Lilley) Burbidge. He has a brother, Francis Burbidge. Upon being confirmed, Michael Burbidge chose Francis as his confirmation name. As a teenager, he worked at a Sears department store.

Burbidge graduated from Cardinal O'Hara High School in Springfield, Pennsylvania, in 1975. Having decided to become a priest, he entered St. Charles Borromeo Seminary in Wynnewood, Pennsylvania. He obtained a Bachelor of Arts degree in philosophy and a Master of Theology degree from St. Charles. He also holds a Master of Education degree in educational administration from Villanova University in Villanova, Pennsylvania, and a Doctor of Education degree from Immaculata University in East Whiteland Township, Pennsylvania.

=== Ordination and ministry ===
Burbidge was ordained to the priesthood by Cardinal John Krol for the Archdiocese of Philadelphia at the Cathedral Basilica of Saints Peter and Paul in Philadelphia on May 19, 1984. After his 1984 ordination, the archdiocese assigned Burbidge as associate pastor at St. Bernard's Parish in Philadelphia. He was transferred in 1986 to serve as a teacher at Cardinal O'Hara High School in Springfield, Pennsylvania.

The archdiocese in 1990 assigned Burbidge to the faculty of Archbishop Wood High School in Warminster, Pennsylvania. He moved the next year to serve as a teacher and dean of students at St. Charles Seminary.

Cardinal Anthony Bevilacqua appointed Burbidge as his priest secretary in 1992, a position he held for the next seven years. The Vatican raised Burbidge to the rank of honorary prelate in 1998. In 1999, Bevilacqua named Burbidge as rector of St. Charles Seminary.

=== Auxiliary Bishop of Philadelphia ===
On June 21, 2002, Burbidge was appointed as an auxiliary bishop of Philadelphia and titular bishop of Cluain Iraird by Pope John Paul II. He received his episcopal consecration on September 5, 2002, from Bevilacqua at Saints Peter and Paul, with Bishops Edward Peter Cullen and Robert P. Maginnis serving as co-consecrators.

As auxiliary bishop, Burbidge worked in the archdiocesan office center to assist the archbishop with administrative duties. These included overseeing the Office of the Vicar for Clergy, the Office of Communications, and The Catholic Standard & Times. He also served as a regional bishop.

=== Bishop of Raleigh ===
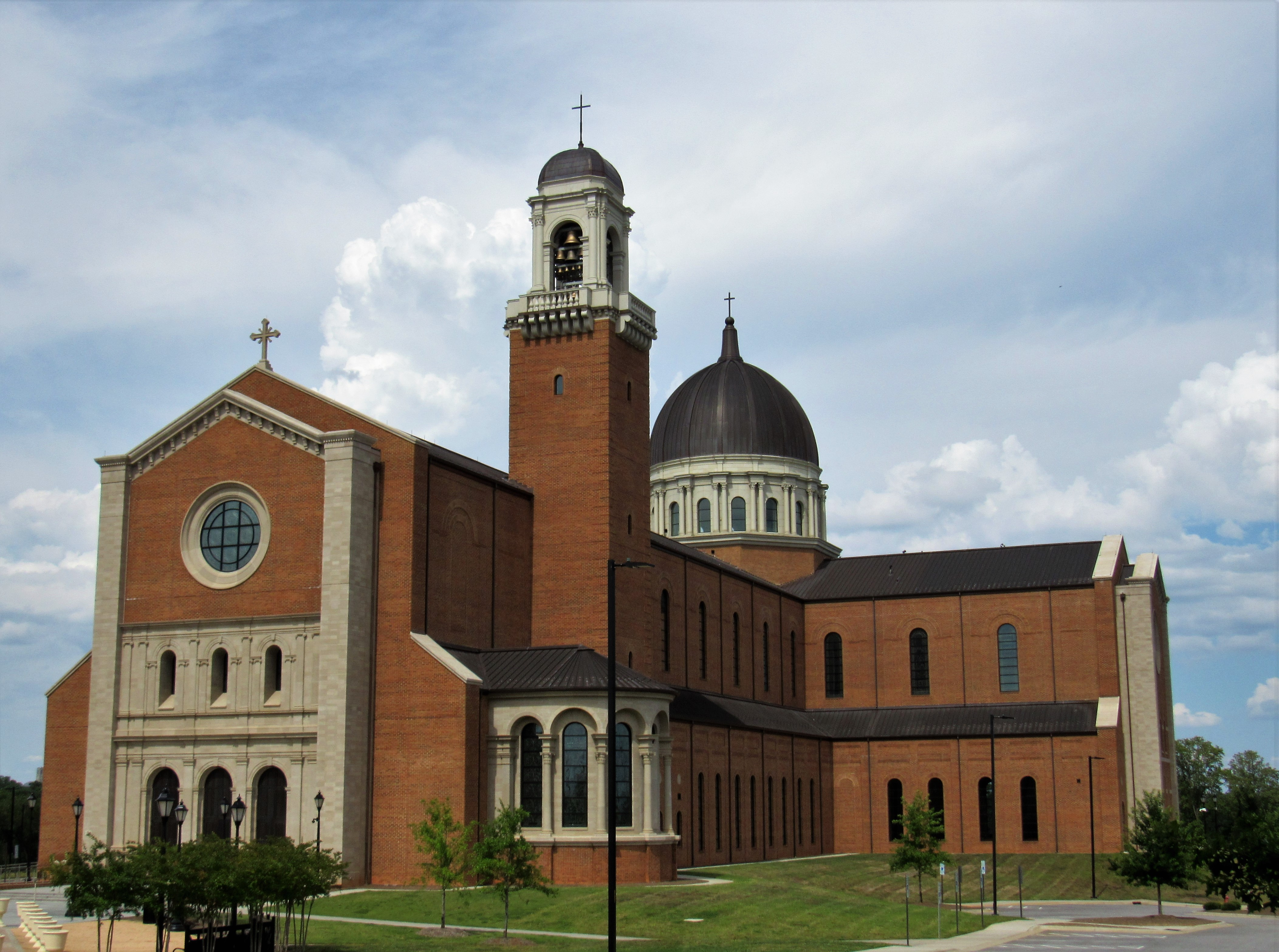
Holy Name of Jesus Cathedral, Raleigh, North Carolina (2019)

Coat of arms as bishop of Raleigh

Burbidge was named bishop of Raleigh by Pope Benedict XVI on June 8, 2006. Burbidge was installed on August 4, 2006, at Sacred Heart Cathedral in Raleigh. In 2011, Burbidge announced the construction of Cathedral of the Holy Name of Jesus in Raleigh. Groundbreaking for the new cathedral occurred in 2015.

After the tornado outbreak of April 2011, which killed 24 people in North Carolina and nearby states, Burbidge urged Catholics to include the victims and survivors in their Holy Week prayers. He directed the parish and mission churches to hold a special collection for the disaster survivors. On November 29, 2016, Burbidge celebrated his last public Mass as bishop of Raleigh at St. Michael the Archangel Church in Cary, North Carolina.

==== Sexual abuse in the Diocese of Raleigh ====
In March 2007, a group of protesters, including some alleged victims of clerical sexual abuse, stood outside the diocesan offices, claiming that Burbidge refused to meet with them. Diocesan spokesman Frank Morock denied those claims, stating that the diocese "has always been very open to any victim who has stepped forward."

In 2009, a 16-year-old boy reported to the diocese that he had been sexually abused by Reverend Edgar Sepulveda, a priest at the Santa Teresa del Niño Jesús Mission in Beulaville, North Carolina. Burbidge put Sepulveda on administrative leave, prohibiting him from visiting any parish or Catholic school, and removed him from residence on church grounds. The diocese reported the accusations immediately to police. Sepulveda was arrested in 2010 and charged with second-degree sexual offense and sexual battery. However, prosecutors dropped the charges in 2012, citing a lack of evidence. The victim sued the diocese and Burbidge in 2015.

=== Bishop of Arlington ===
Burbidge was appointed as the fourth bishop of Arlington by Pope Francis on October 4, 2016. Burbidge was installed on December 6, 2016, at the Cathedral of St. Thomas More in Arlington, Virginia. More than 1,200 people attended the Mass, including Cardinal Justin Rigali, Cardinal Donald Wuerl, then-Cardinal Theodore McCarrick, Archbishop William E. Lori and Archbishop Christophe Pierre.

Burbidge released a statement on October 6, 2016, in which he vowed to continue the diocese's outreach for victims of clerical sexual abuse and to personally reach out to victims. He continued on the outreach program, holding Masses for victims of abuse.On July 26, 2017, Burbidge returned to the Diocese of Raleigh to celebrate Mass with his successor in Raleigh, Bishop Luis Rafael Zarama, and to give the homily at the dedication of the Cathedral of the Holy Name of Jesus.

In August 2017, William Aitcheson admitted to being a member of the Ku Klux Klan while a college student in the 1970s. Aitcheson announced that he would temporarily step down from his post at St. Leo the Great Catholic Parish in Fairfax, Virginia. Burbidge released a statement referring to Aitcheson's past as "sad and deeply troubling" while hoping that his conversion of heart would inspire others.

In August 2018, Burbidge expressed his anger and sadness regarding the allegations of sexual abuse by former Cardinal McCarrick. He stated that bishops must be held accountable for their actions. Burbidge was diagnosed with prostate cancer in 2018 and was treated through surgery that same year. In February 2019, Burbidge and Bishop Barry C. Knestout of Richmond released a list of clergy who had been credibly accused of sexual abuse of minors in the two dioceses between 1974 and 2019.

In January 2022, Burbidge issued regulations for the diocese regarding Pope Francis' motu proprio Traditionis custodes. He permitted celebration of the Extraordinary Form of the Mass in the Roman Rite to continue in 21 parishes, but suspended the celebration of any "new celebrations of the Sacraments" in the extraordinary form. This decision was made after the Vatican's responsa ad dubia was issued the previous month, which constituted a non-authoritative attempt to suppress the celebration of sacraments according to the ancient forms of the Rituale Romanum and the Pontificale Romanum.

In July 2022, Burbidge restricted the extraordinary form to only eight parishes. In five of those eight parishes, the priests could only celebrate the extraordinary Mass outside of the main church.

=== U.S. Conference of Catholic Bishops ===
At the November 2017 USCCB plenary assembly, Burbidge was elected as chair of the Communications Committee. He became the chair for the 2018 to 2021 term. (Note: Chairmen of USCCB standing committees serve one-year terms as chairmen-elect, followed by three-year terms as chairmen.)At the November 2022 plenary assembly, Burbidge was elected chair of the Pro-Life Activities Committee. His term as chair was to end in 2024.

== Viewpoints ==
=== Abortion ===
Burbidge was described in a 2022 Catholic News Agency article as a "seasoned communicator" and a "staunch defender of the right to life". The article cited his banning of Nancy Pelosi, speaker of the US House of Representatives, from receiving communion in the Diocese of Arlington for her defense of abortion rights for women.

In June 2022, Burbidge called upon U.S. President Joe Biden to publicly repent for his support of abortion rights.

=== Immigration ===
In January 2017, Burbidge spoke out against Executive Order 13769, issued by U.S. President Donald Trump, which barred refugees and immigrants from several Middle Eastern nations from entering the United States for 90 days The order also limited the number of refugee arrivals to the United States to 50,000 for 2017, suspended the United States Refugee Admissions Program for 120 days, and bars refugees from the Syrian Civil War from entering the United States indefinitely. Burbidge encouraged American Catholics to contact their elected officials and voice their opposition to the new policy and to pray for immigration reform, stating that the Diocese of Arlington and other Catholic communities would continue to welcome refugees.

In September 2017, Burbidge responded to Trump's decision to rescind Deferred Action for Childhood Arrivals (DACA) by calling on Catholics to keep all people protected by DACA, and all government officials, in their prayers. He referred to Trump's decision as "disheartening" and stated that the United States government has a responsibility to protect those who are in the United States under the protection of DACA.

=== LGBTQ rights ===
In 2012, Burbidge voiced his support for North Carolina Amendment 1 and criticized U.S. President Barack Obama's opposition to it. Amendment 1 defined civil marriage as between one man and one woman. Opponents argued that Amendment 1 discriminated against LGBTQ people; Burbidge argued that it was not discriminatory. He received criticism for supporting the legislation. Amendment 1 passed, but was declared unconstitutional in US federal court in October 2014.

In June 2015, the United States Supreme Court ruled in favor of same-sex marriage in the Obergefell v. Hodges case, legalizing same-sex marriage in the United States. Burbidge, in response, said, "the true definition of marriage cannot be redefined by courts" and reiterated the Catholic Church's official teachings on marriage. He ended his statement saying that "we are to treat and engage one another in mutual and lasting respect."

In May 2016, Burbidge criticized the Public Facilities Privacy & Security Act, passed by the North Carolina General Assembly. The act requires individuals to only use restrooms that correspond to the sex on their birth certificates and was seen as discriminatory against members of the LGBTQ community. Burbidge proposed that "...another remedy to the unfortunate situation created by the Charlotte Ordinance and HB2 should be considered..." and hoped that any legislative solution would

"...defend human dignity; avoid any form of bigotry; respect religious liberty and the convictions of religious institutions; work for the common good; and be discussed in a peaceful and respectful manner."

In August 2021, Burbidge released a pastoral letter, Catechesis on the Human Person and Gender Ideology, in which he explained the church's positions on transgender people. In the letter, Burbidge criticized the use of preferred gender pronouns when addressing transgender people. He also stated that "no one is transgender" and accused transgender people of "rejecting truth."

=== Social justice ===
In 2013, Burbidge indicated his support for the Moral Mondays protests in North Carolina. It was a movement started by religious progressives encouraging civil disobedience and arguing for reforms to North Carolina laws regarding the environment, racial justice, gender equality, social programs, and education. Burbidge signed A Joint Statement by Episcopal, Lutheran, Presbyterian, Roman Catholic and United Methodist Leaders in North Carolina, but did not permit Catholic priests to join the protests.

Following the Unite the Right rally that took place August 11 and 12, 2017, in Charlottesville, Virginia to protest the removal of the Robert E. Lee Monument, Burbidge called the ensuing violence "saddening and disheartening." He condemned violence, racism, bigotry, hatred and "self-proclaimed superiority", denouncing "any form of hatred as a sin."

== Pastoral letters ==
- Bishop's Letter to Congregation at Colgan's funeral (2017)
- Bishop Burbidge's letter to parishioners at St. Leo Parish on Fr. Aitcheson (2018)
- A Letter to Parents from Bishop Burbidge for Catholic Schools Week 2018 (2018)
- Letter from Bishop Burbidge on the Novena for the Legal Protection for Human Life (2018)
- Letter to the Faithful from Bishop Burbidge regarding the Pennsylvania grand jury report and allegations of sexual abuse in the Church (2018)
- Being Citizens Faithful to the Lord (2018)
- Letter to the Faithful from Bishop Burbidge for World Day of the Poor 2018 (2018)
- Bishop Burbidge issues letter to St. Andrew the Apostle Church regarding Fr. Christopher Mould 2019)
- Letter to the Faithful from Bishop Burbidge for World Day of the Poor 2019 (2019)
- Letter to the Faithful from Bishop Burbidge regarding the #JustOneYes Campaign (2019)
- In Tongues All Can Hear: Communicating the Hope of Christ in Times of Trial (2020)
- Letter from Bishop Michael F. Burbidge on World Day Migrants and Refugees 2020 (2020)
- Letter from Most Reverend Michael F. Burbidge Bishop of Arlington on the World Day of the Poor (2020)
- Letter from Bishop Michael F Burbidge on Christmas 2020 (2020)
- Statement from Bishop Michael F. Burbidge for Catholic Schools Week 2021 (2021)
- A Letter from Bishop Michael F. Burbidge on Easter 2021 (2021)
- A Catechesis on the Human Person and Gender Ideology (2021)
- Our Sacred Duty (2021)
- Letter by Bishop Burbidge on XVI Ordinary General Assembly of the Synod of Bishops (2021)
- Letter by Bishop Burbidge on Christmas 2021 (2021)

== See also ==
- Catholic Church in the United States
- Hierarchy of the Catholic Church
- Historical list of the Catholic bishops of the United States
- List of Catholic bishops in the United States
- Lists of popes, patriarchs, primates, archbishops, and bishops

== Notes ==
Catholic Church titles
Preceded by –	Auxiliary Bishop of Philadelphia; 2002–2006	Succeeded by –
Preceded by Francis Joseph Gossman	Bishop of Raleigh; 2006–2016	Succeeded by Luis R. Zarama
Preceded by Paul Loverde	Bishop of Arlington; 2016–present	Incumbent
USCCB titles
Preceded by William E. Lori	Chairman, Pro-Life Activities Committee; 2022–present	Incumbent
Preceded by Christopher J. Coyne	Chairman, Communications Committee; 2018–2021	Succeeded by Robert P. Reed
