= Cathedral of Saint Thomas More (Arlington, Virginia) =

Catholic cathedral in Virginia, U.S.

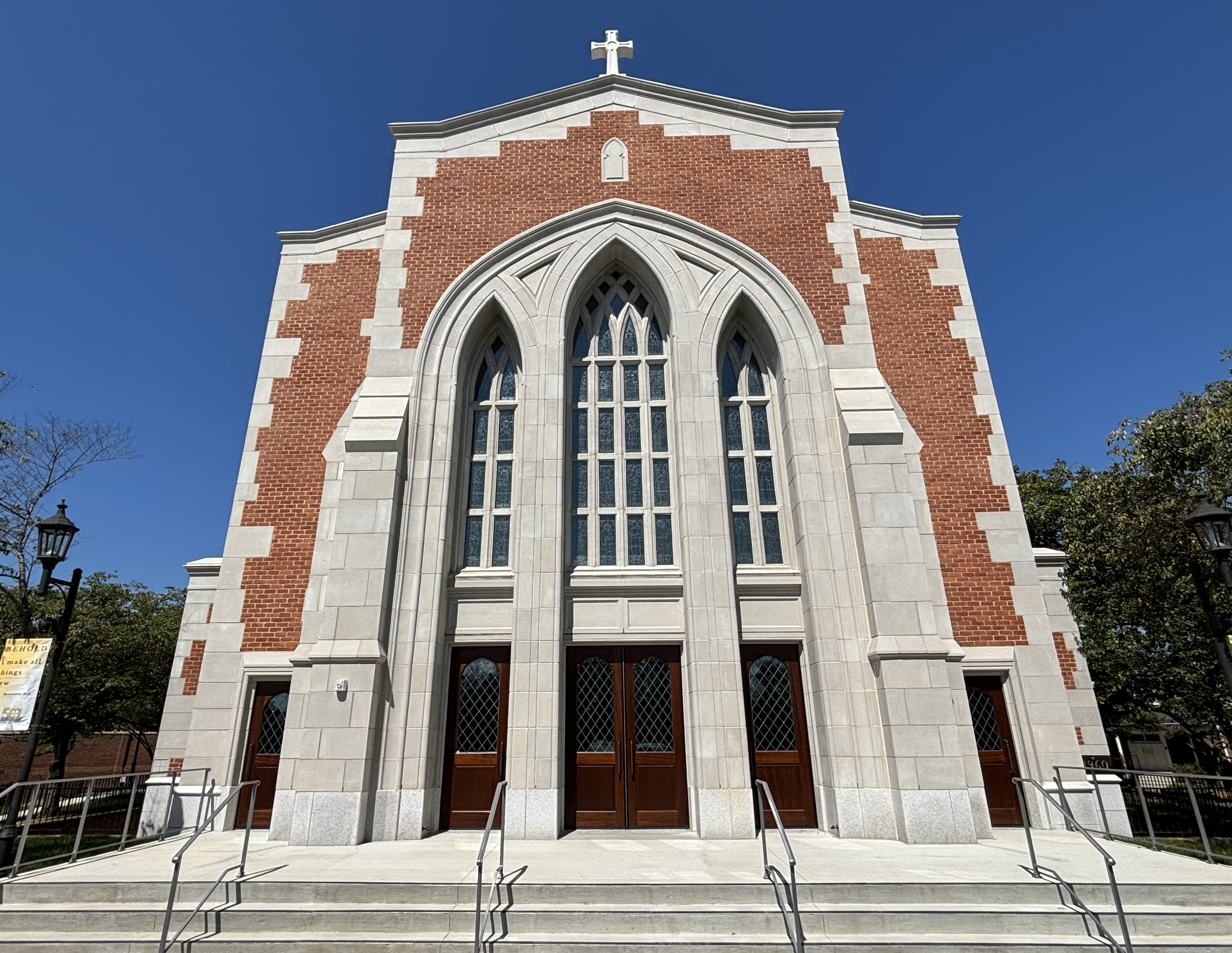
- Cathedral in 2024

- Location in Virginia Location in United States
- 38°52′14.4″N 77°6′12.2″W
- Location: Arlington, Virginia
- Country: United States
- Denomination: Catholic Church
- Sui iuris church: Latin Church
- Website: cathedralstm.org

History
- Founded: 1938
- Dedication: St. Thomas More

Architecture
- Architectural type: Modern (1961-2023) Tudor (2024-Present)
- Completed: 1961

Administration
- Diocese: Arlington

Clergy
- Bishop: Michael F. Burbidge
- Vicar(s): Kevin Dansereau; Rev. Eliberto de Jesus Garcia Pareja

The Cathedral of Saint Thomas More located at 3901 Cathedral Lane is the cathedral of the Diocese of Arlington in Virginia and the seat of Bishop Michael F. Burbidge. The rector of the cathedral is Patrick L. Posey, appointed in June 2019.

== History ==
=== St. Thomas More Church ===
The predecessor to the Cathedral of St. Thomas More was St. Thomas More Church in Arlington. During the early 20th century, the city was served only by St. Charles Borromeo Church, founded in 1909. At that time, Northern Virginia was under the jurisdiction of the Diocese of Richmond. During the 1930s, the growth of Arlington necessitated the founding of another parish.

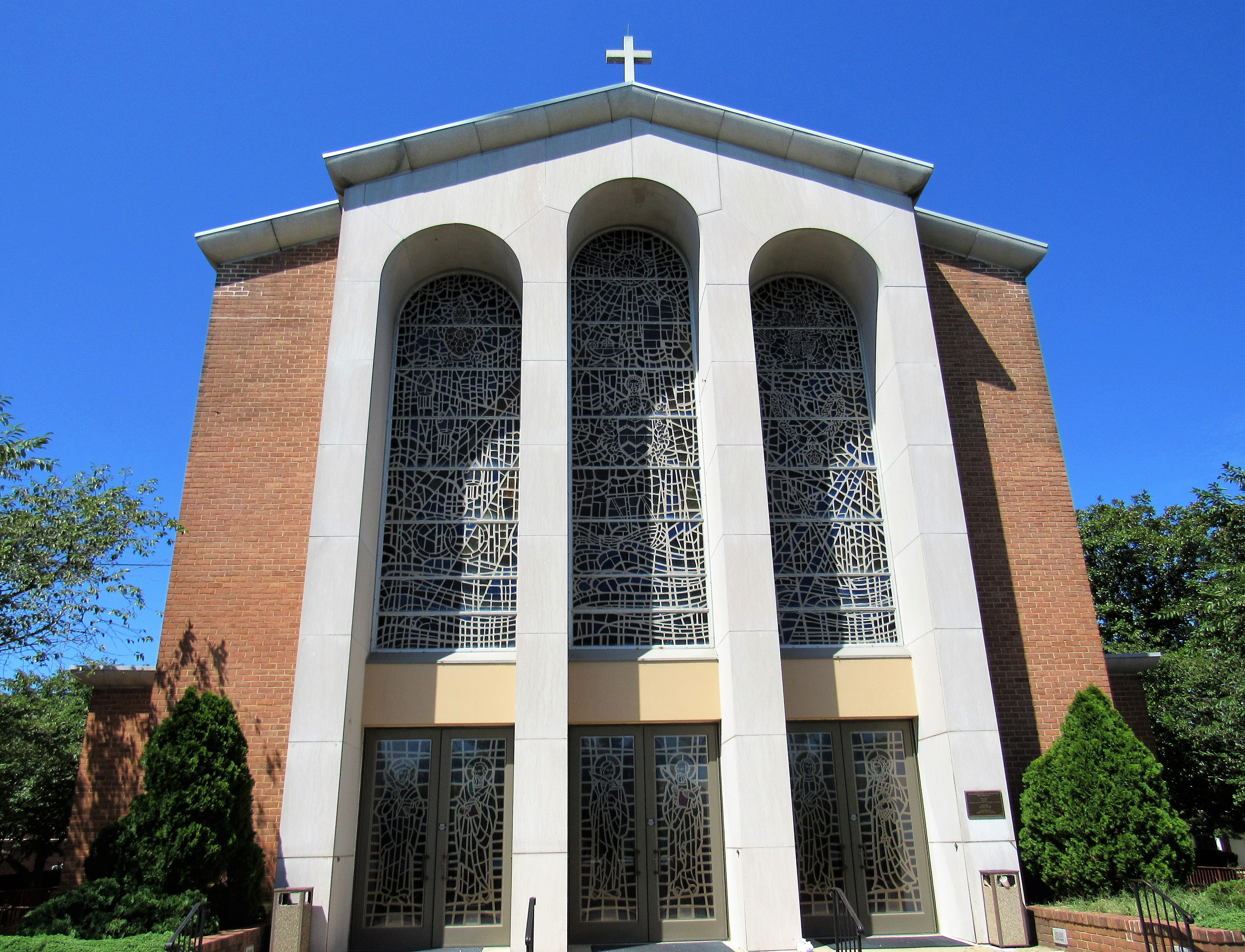
Original facade (2019)

The parish was established in 1938 and named for St. Thomas More. The first St. Thomas More church was completed in 1942. In 1944, the parish established St. Thomas More Cathedral School, operated by the Sisters, Servants of the Immaculate Heart of Mary.

The rectory was expanded in 1945. In 1950, the parish constructed the first level of a future church building and moved worship services into this crypt. A convent for the teaching sisters was erected in 1955. In 1961, the parish completed the upper level of their church building. A pipe organ constructed by the Muller Pipe Organ Company of Toledo, Ohio, was installed at that time. St. Thomas More Church was dedicated on December 9, 1961 by Bishop John J. Russell of Richmond.

=== Cathedral of St. Thomas More ===
On May 28, 1974, Pope Paul VI erected the Diocese of Arlington and named Bishop Thomas Jerome Welsh as its first bishop. St. Thomas More Church was designated as the Cathedral of St. Thomas More. In 1980, the diocese replaced the Muller pipe organ in the cathedral with one from the Newcomer Organ Company of Washington, D.C. One year later, the parish repurposed the church crypt as the Parish Activities Hall.

Due to declining numbers, the Sisters, Servants of the Immaculate Heart of Mary, withdrew their teaching services from St. Thomas More School. The cathedral choir performed for Pope John Paul II during his papal visit to the region in 2001. Another renovation of the cathedral took place in 2015.

To mark the Diocese of Arlington's 50th anniversary, Bishop Michael Burbidge announced an extensive renovation of the cathedral. Jim O’Brien of O’Brien and Keane Architecture of Arlington was the architect for the project. The building was transformed from its original mid-century-modern appearance to one emulating the Tudor style. A rose window depicting The New Jerusalem was added to the north elevation. Other stained glass windows depict the life of the Holy Family, individual depictions of the Virgin Mary and St. Joseph, and the patron saints of parishes in the diocese. Several new devotional shrines and statues were added. The cathedral was completed and reopened in September 2024.

As of 2024, the parish had 1,400 members. It currently offers grade levels pre-kindergarten through eighth and has approximately 400 students.

== Description ==
Since its 2023-2024 renovation, the cathedral has had a neogothic appearance. Prior to the renovation, it was in a predominantly mid-century modern style. The altar is located at the crossing of the Latin cross-shaped structure. Located in a gallery behind the altar is a three-manual M.P. Moeller organ with 28 ranks of pipes installed in 1961. The organ was redesigned and expanded to 53 ranks in 1980 by organ builder Robert Wyant. He served as cathedral organist from 1964, after two years as assistant organist, until his retirement in 1998.

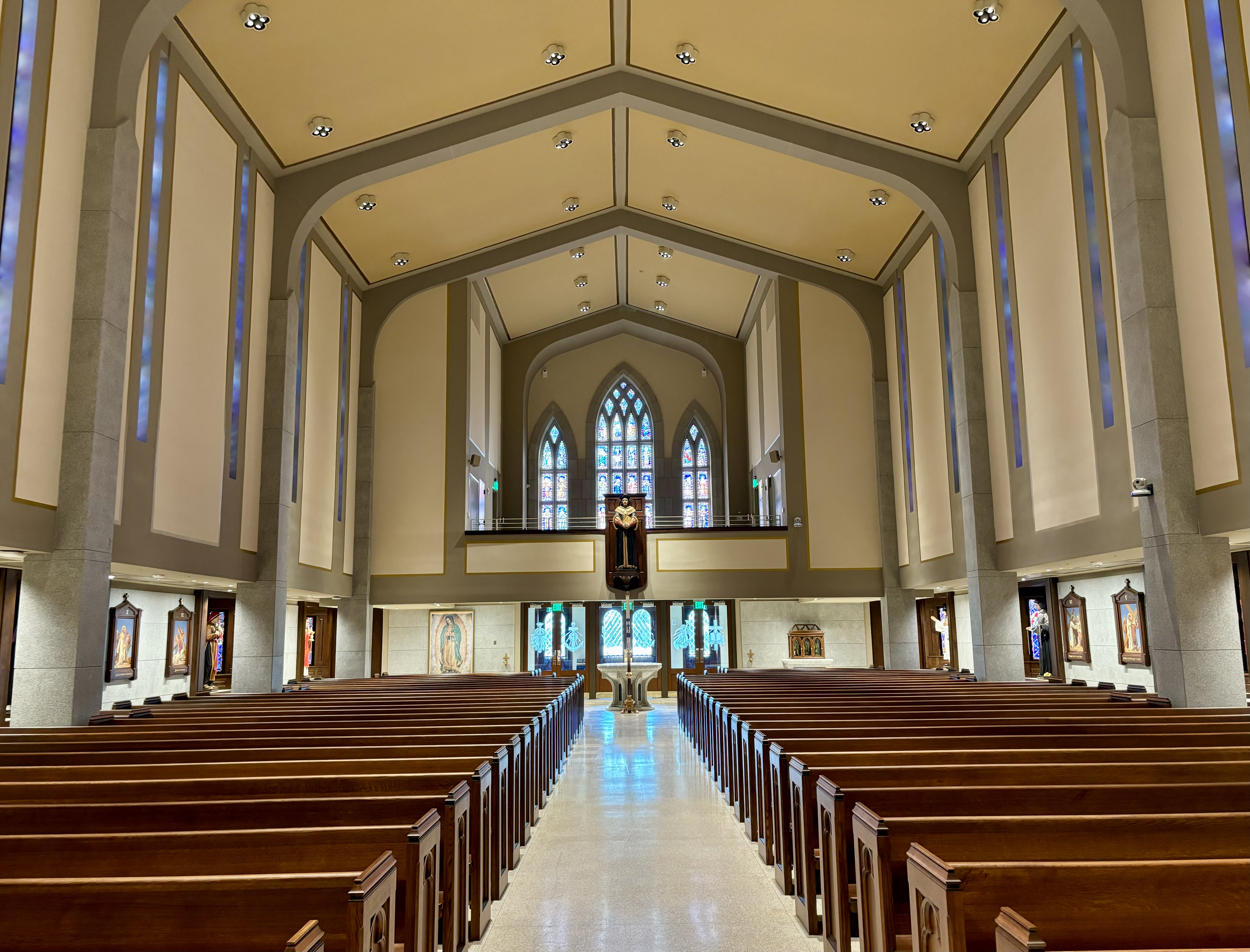
Gallery as seen from nave (2024)

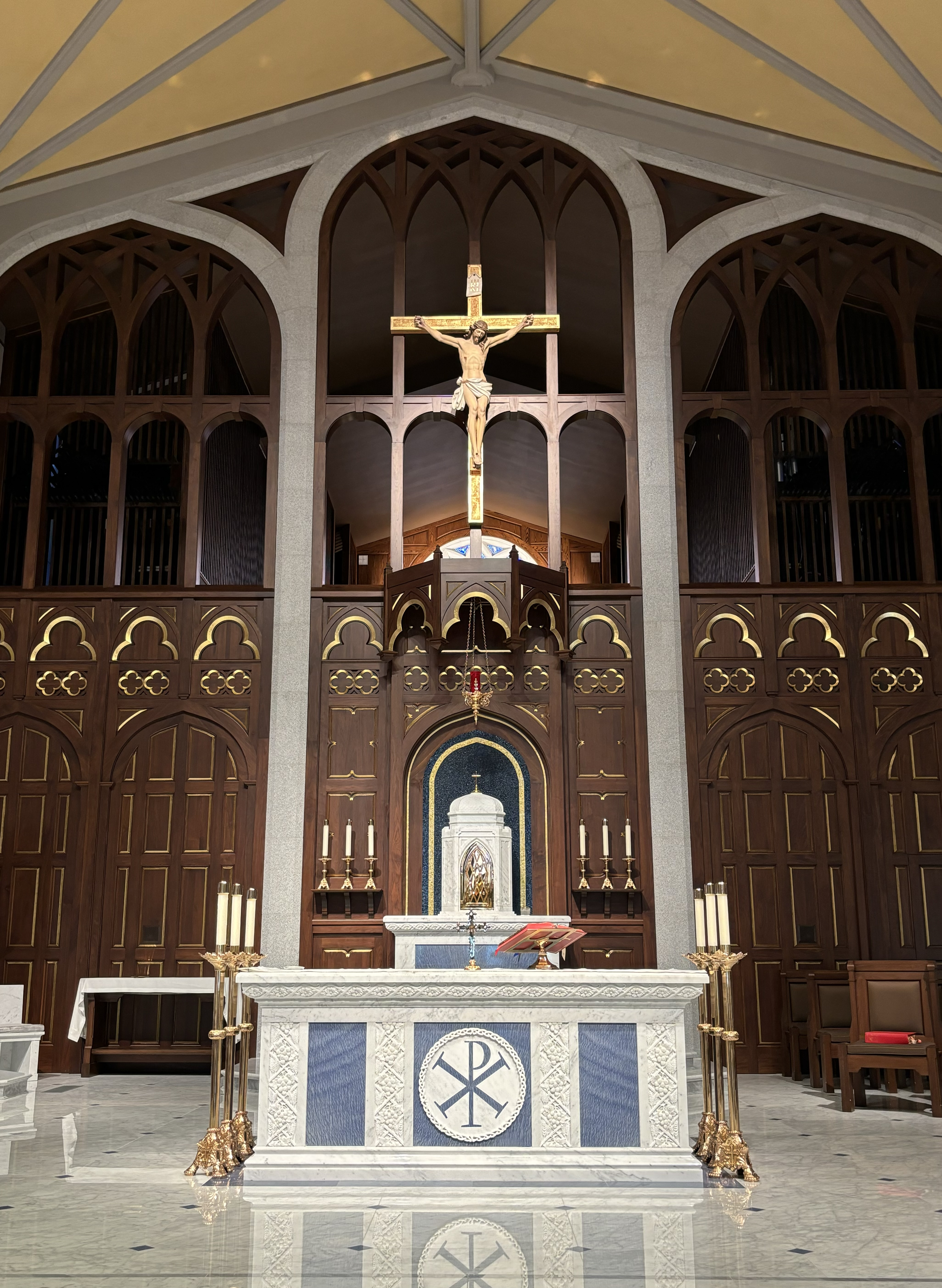
Altar (2024)

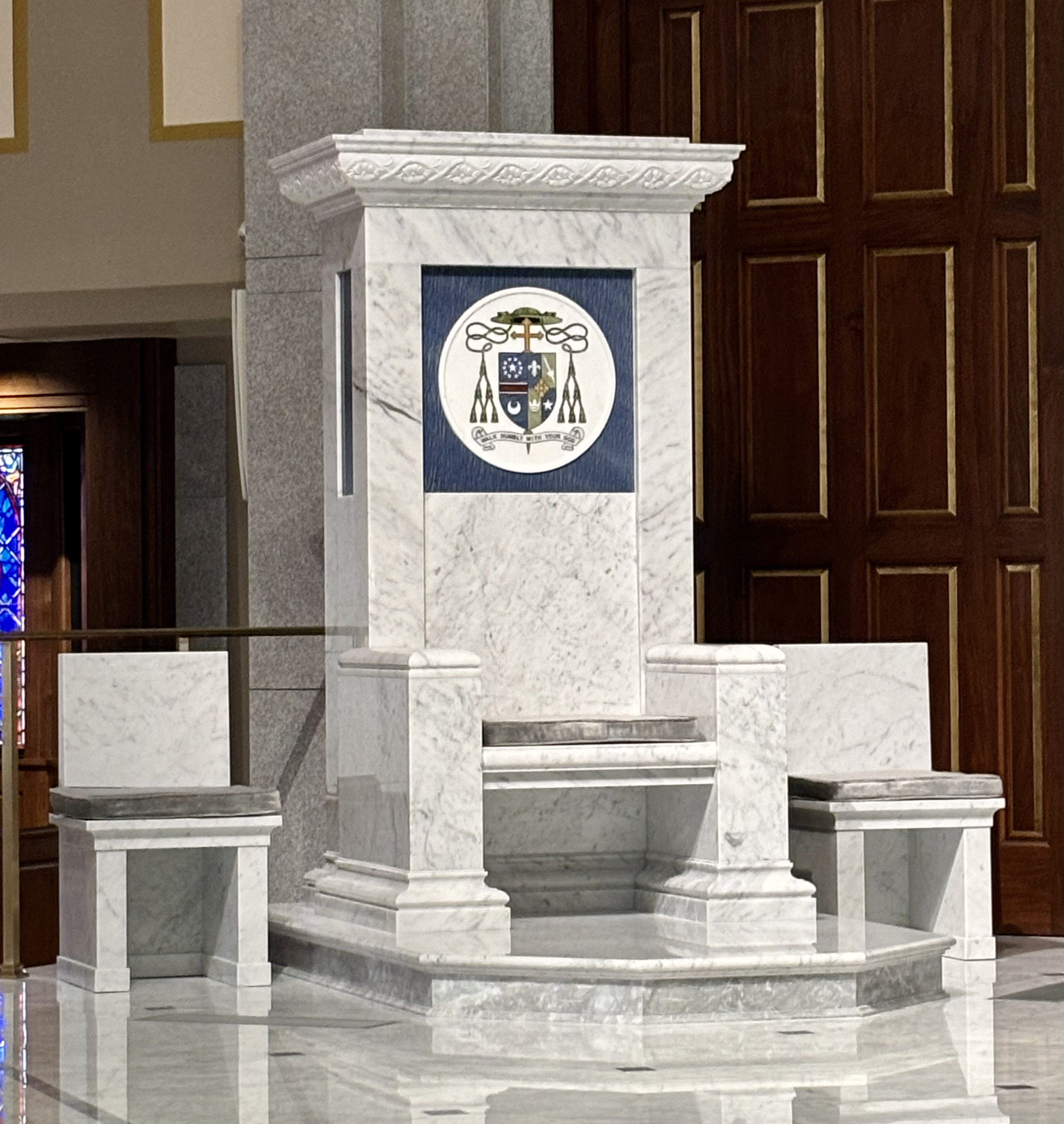
Cathedra (2024)
