= Diocese of Arlington =

Latin Catholic jurisdiction in Virginia, United States

Diocese of Arlington Dioecesis Arlingtonensis

Catholic
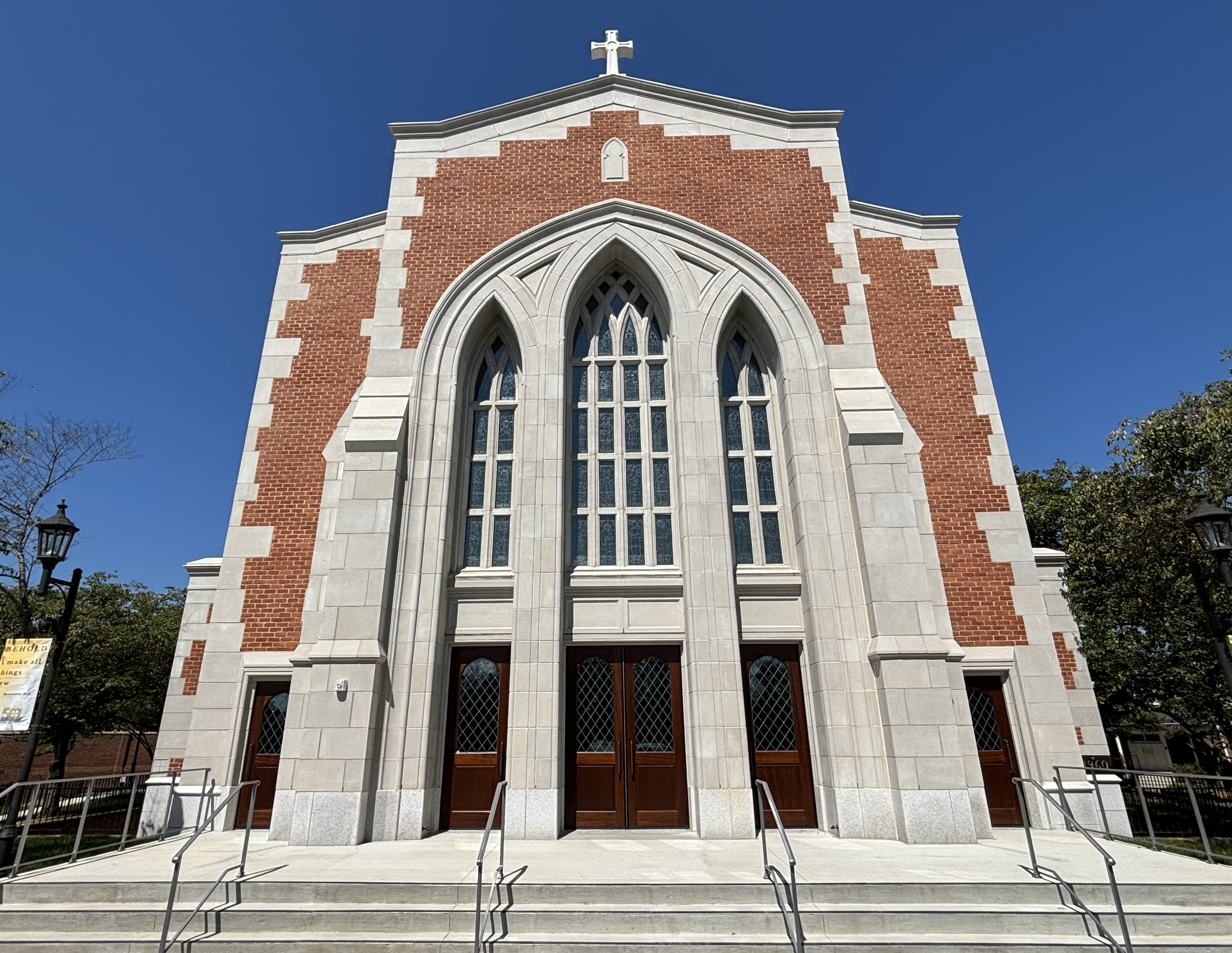
- Cathedral of St. Thomas More

- Coat of arms

- Flag

Location
- Country: United States
- Territory: northeastern Virginia counties of Arlington, Clarke, Culpeper, Fairfax, Fauquier, Frederick, King George, Lancaster, Loudoun, Madison, Northumberland, Orange, Page, Prince William, Rappahannock, Richmond, Shenandoah, Spotsylvania, Stafford, Warren and Westmoreland; Cities of Alexandria, Fairfax, Falls Church, Fredericksburg, Manassas, Manassas Park, and Winchester
- Episcopal conference: United States Conference of Catholic Bishops
- Ecclesiastical region: Region IV
- Ecclesiastical province: Province of Baltimore
- Metropolitan: Archdiocese of Baltimore
- Headquarters: 200 North Glebe Rd. Arlington County, Virginia, U.S.
- Coordinates: 38°52′14.4″N 77°06′12.2″W

Statistics
- Area: 6,541 sq mi (16,940 km^{2})
- Population: Total; Catholics: (as of 2023); ▲3,381,214 (Note: Annuario Pontificio (2023) via Catholic-Hierarchy.org); ▼433,401 (▼12.8%)
- Parishes: 70 (2023)

Information
- Denomination: Catholic Church
- Sui iuris church: Latin Church
- Rite: Roman Rite
- Established: May 28, 1974 (52 years ago)
- Cathedral: Cathedral of Saint Thomas More
- Patron saint: St. Thomas More
- Secular priests: ▲195 diocesan (2023); ▲60 religious priests; ▼56 permanent deacons

Current leadership
- Pope: Leo XIV
- Bishop: Michael F. Burbidge
- Metropolitan Archbishop: William Lori
- Vicar General: Jamie R. Workman
- Bishops emeritus: Paul Loverde

Map
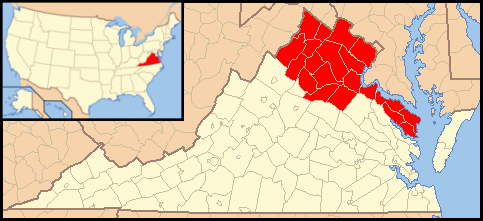

Website
- www.arlingtondiocese.org

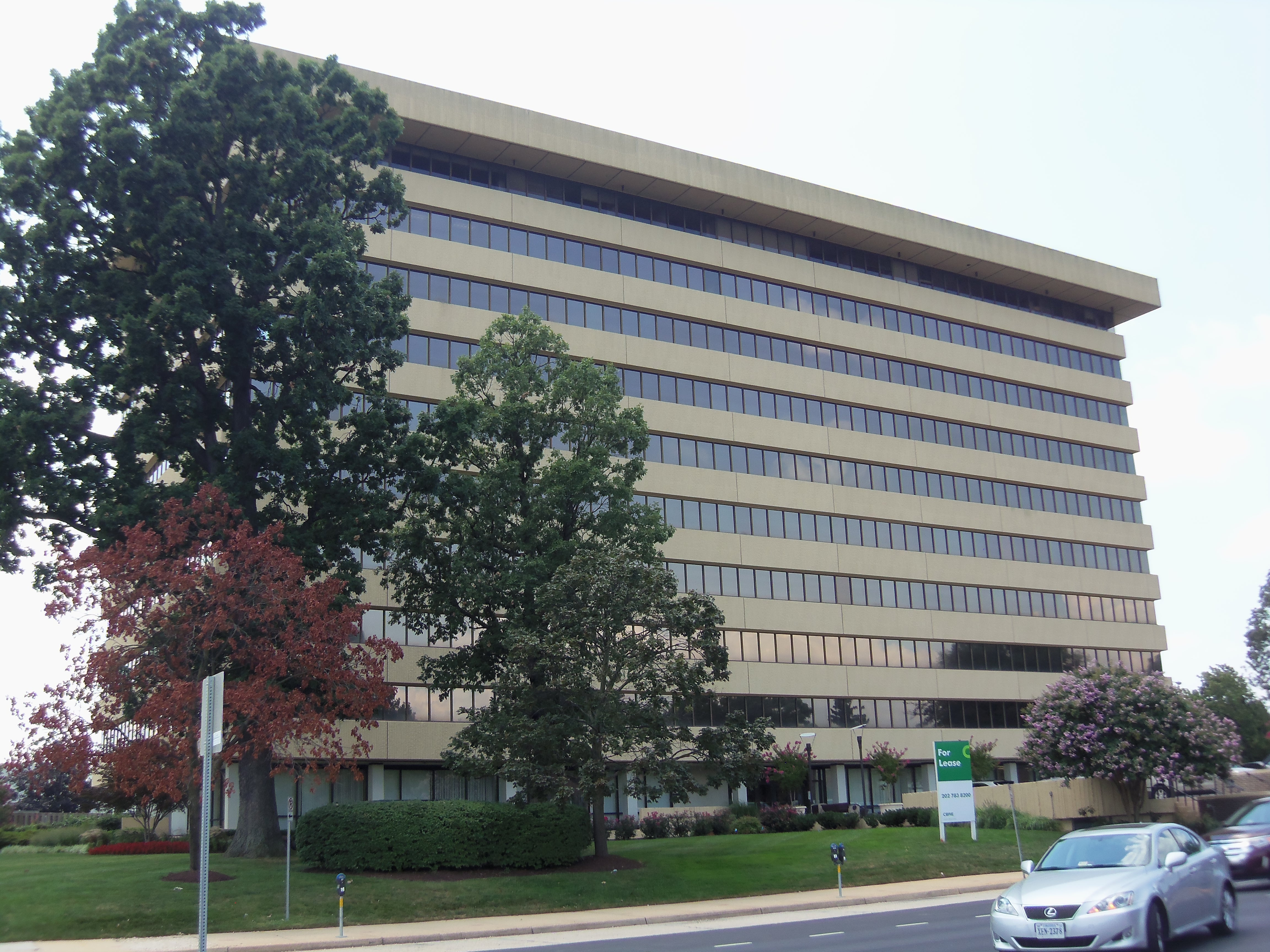
Diocesan offices, Arlington, Virginia 2013

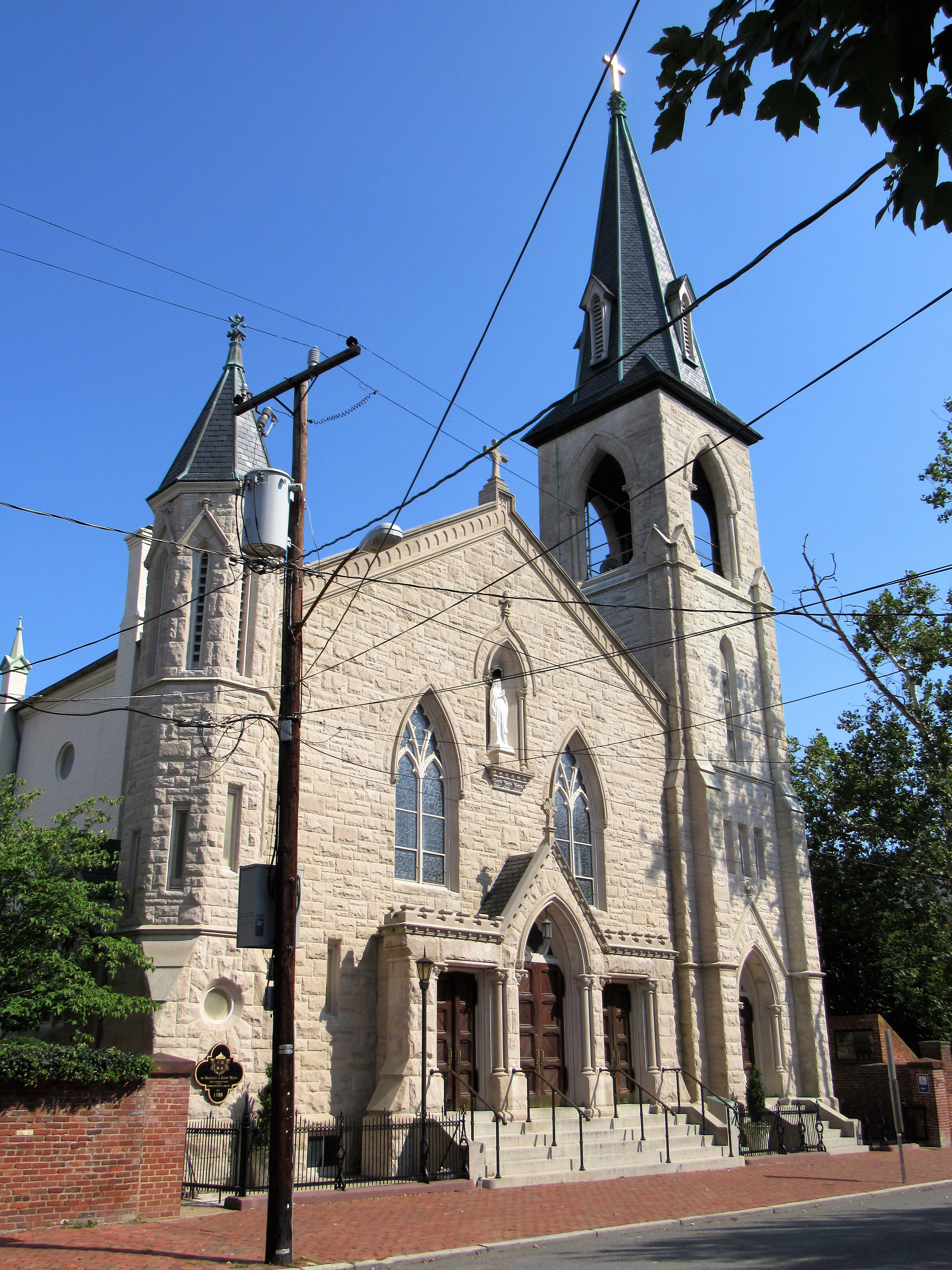
Basilica of St. Mary, Alexandria, Virginia (2019)

The Diocese of Arlington (Latin: Dioecesis Arlingtonensis) is a Latin diocese of the Catholic Church in Northern Virginia in the United States. It is a suffragan diocese in the ecclesiastical province of the Archdiocese of Baltimore. The Cathedral of St. Thomas More is the mother church of the diocese.

Michael F. Burbidge has been serving as bishop of the Diocese of Arlington since December 2016. The patron saint of the diocese is the English statesman Thomas More.

== Statistics ==
In 2020, the Diocese of Arlington had 255 priests (195 secular priests; 60 religious priests) and 433,401 Catholics. As of 2023, the total population within the diocese, Catholic and non-Catholic, was 3,381,214. There are 70 parishes across 21 Northern Virginia counties and seven cities in the diocese:

== Counties ==
The following counties are in the Diocese of Arlington:

- Arlington
- Clarke
- Culpeper
- Fairfax
- Fauquier
- Frederick
- King George
- Lancaster
- Loudoun
- Madison
- Northumberland
- Orange
- Page
- Prince William
- Rappahannock
- Richmond
- Shenandoah
- Spotsylvania
- Stafford
- Warren
- Westmoreland

== History ==
=== 1600 to 1784 ===
Prior to the American Revolution, few Catholics lived in the British Colony of Virginia. In 1634, John Altham, a Jesuit companion of Andrew White, performed missionary work among the Native American tribes living on the south bank of the Potomac River. The colonial government of Virginia soon enacted stringent laws against the practice of Catholicism. During the late 17th century, the few Catholic settlers in northern Virginia, living near Aquia Creek, were attended by John Carroll and other Jesuit missionaries from Maryland.By 1776, the city of Alexandria had a log chapel with a resident Catholic priest.

=== 1784 to 1820 ===
After the American Revolution ended in 1783, Pope Pius VI in 1784 erected the Prefecture Apostolic of the United States, encompassing the entire territory of the new nation. With the passage in 1786 of the Virginia Statute for Religious Freedom, written by future US President Thomas Jefferson, Catholics were granted religious freedom in the new state of Virginia.

The Vatican in 1789 erected the Diocese of Baltimore, the first diocese in the United States, to replace the prefecture apostolic. John Thayer, a Boston priest, was stationed by the diocese at the Alexandria chapel in 1794. In 1795, the chapel became St. Mary's Church, the first Catholic church in Virginia. It is today the Basilica of Saint Mary.

=== 1820 to 1974 ===
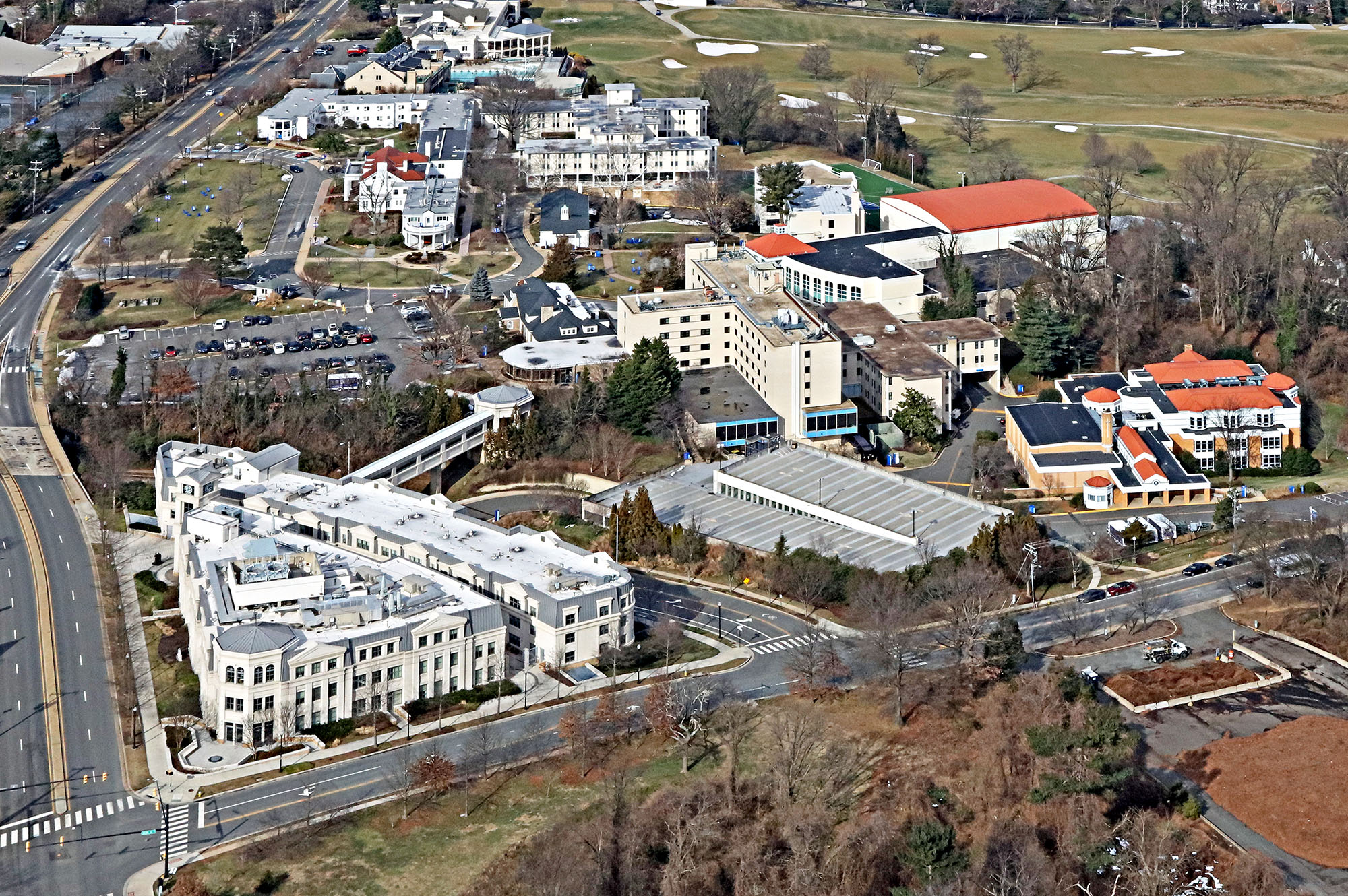
Marymount University, Arlington, Virginia (2022)

Pope Pius VII erected the Diocese of Richmond on July 11, 1820, including all of Virginia (except two Eastern Shore counties) and the present state of West Virginia. The Northern Virginia area would remain part of this diocese for the next 154 years.In Fredericksburg, St Mary of the Immaculate Conception Church was dedicated in 1858.

The first parish in Falls Church, St. James, was erected in 1873. In Manassas, the first Catholic parish was All Saints, erected in 1878. St. John the Beloved, founded as a mission church in McLean in 1913, was the first in that community.In 1924, St. Timothy's opened as a mission in Chantilly, its first Catholic church.

In 1950, nuns from the Sacred Heart Order established a girls' college in Arlington; today it is Marymount University. By 1957, the Diocese of Richmond had founded eleven new parishes in Alexandria, Arlington, and Fairfax; in 1946, only eight parishes existed in the region. In Annandale, St. Ambrose was the first parish, founded in 1966. St. Thomas à Becket Church in Reston was erected in 1970, the first parish in that community.That same year, Holy Family Catholic Church opened in Dale City.

=== 1974 to 1999 ===
The Diocese of Arlington was established on May 28, 1974, removing its territory from the Diocese of Richmond. Pope Paul VI appointed Auxiliary Bishop Thomas Welsh of the Archdiocese of Philadelphia as the first bishop of Arlington.

During his tenure, Welsh established six new parishes and dedicated eleven new churches in the diocese. He created the Office of Migration and Refugee Services in 1975 and the Family Life Bureau in 1977. That same year, Christendom College opened in Front Royal.

Welsh also started the diocesan newspaper, The Arlington Catholic Herald. Walsh was the founding president of the board of the Catholic Home Study Institute, which became the Catholic International University. The number of Catholics in the diocese increased from 154,000 to 179,000 under his tenure. Welsh was named bishop of the Diocese of Allentown in 1983.

John Keating of the Archdiocese of Chicago was named bishop of Arlington by Pope John Paul II in 1983 to replace Welsh. Keating issued six pastoral letters. In 1994, he made national headlines by refusing to allow female altar servers in the diocese. When Keating died in 1998, the diocese had over 336,000 Catholics, 65 parishes, and five missions.

=== 1999 to 2020 ===
Bishop Paul Loverde of the Diocese of Ogdensburg was named by John Paul II as the third bishop of Arlington in 1999. Loverde reinstated the permanent diaconate program, and allowed seminarians to study at Blessed John XXIII National Seminary in Weston, Massachusetts, the Pontifical College Josephinum in Columbus, Ohio, and the Catholic University of America. He also supported religious orders coming into the diocese, such as the Franciscan Sisters of the Eucharist and the Cloistered Dominicans. In 2006, Loverde permitted female altar servers, at the discretion of the local pastors, for the first time.

Loverde in 2012 announced that all religious instructors in the diocesan schools would be required to take an oath to uphold all teachings of the Catholic church. In 2015, Divine Mercy University was established in Sterling. Loverde retired as bishop of Arlington in 2016. Bishop Michael Burbidge from the Diocese of Raleigh was named bishop of Arlington by Pope Francis in 2016.

=== 2020 to present ===
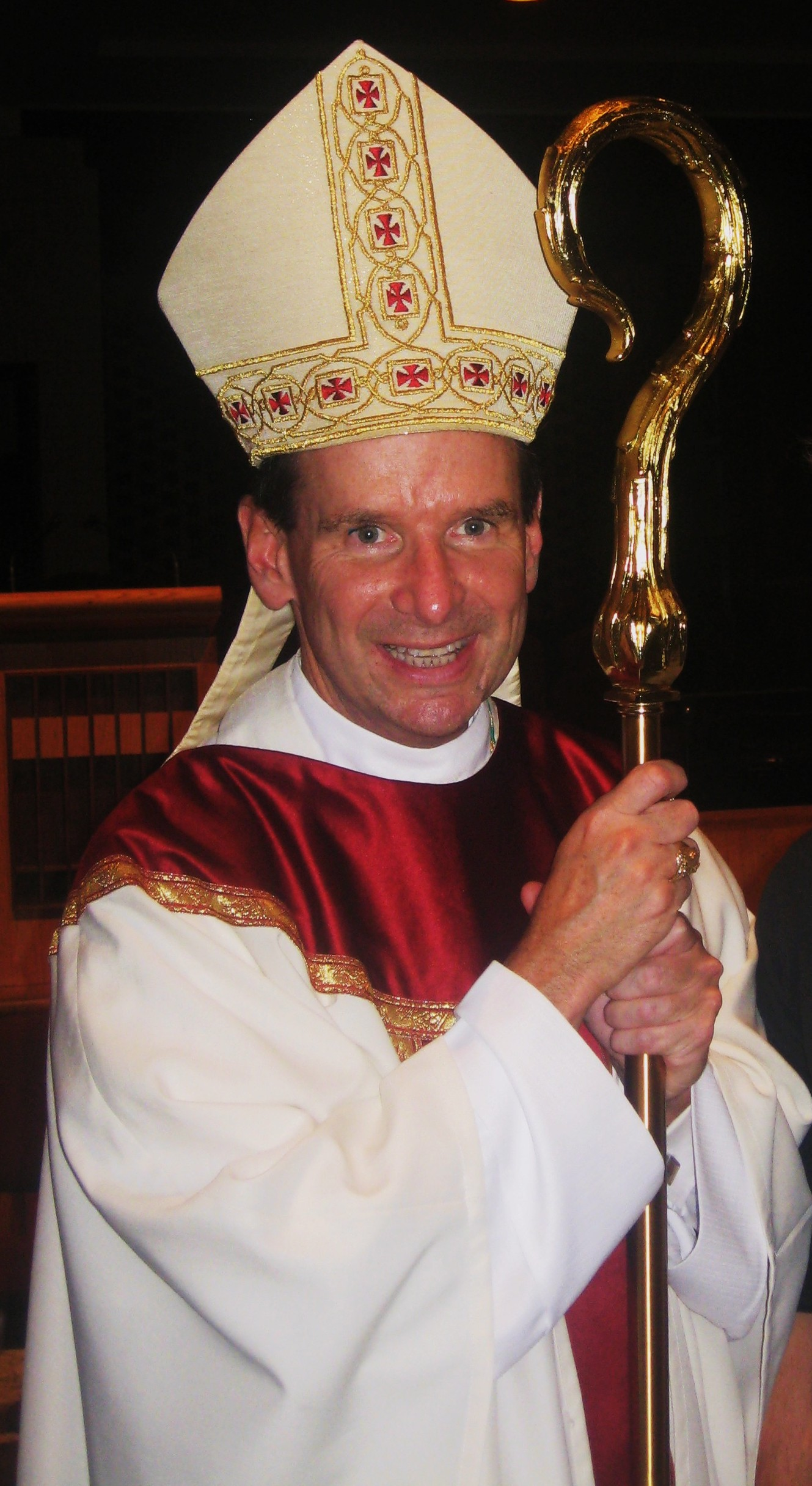
Bishop Burbidge (2010)

On August 12, 2021, Burbidge released a pastoral letter on the church's stance on transgenderism. In the letter, he criticized the use of preferred gender pronouns when addressing transgender people. In January 2022, the diocese instructed its schools to follow Virginia Governor Glenn Youngkin's anti-mask executive order for schools that was to go into effect on January 24th.

Also in January 2022, Burbidge restricted use of the Tridentine Latin Mass in the diocese, in accordance with the apostolic letter Traditionis custodes issued by Pope Francis in July 2021. Burbidge permitted 21 parishes already celebrating the Tridentine Mass to continue the practice, but banned any other parishes from starting it. In July 2022, Burbidge restricted the Tridentine Mass to eight parishes; in five of those eight parishes, the priest could not celebrate the Mass in the main church.

In May 2022, Burbidge announced that he would ban US House Speaker Nancy Pelosi from receiving communion in the diocese due to her support of abortion rights for women. Pelosi had been first banned in the Archdiocese of San Francisco by Archbishop Salvatore J. Cordileone. As of 2026, Burbidge is the current bishop of Arlington.

=== Sexual abuse ===
In August 1992, William T. Reinecke, chancellor of the diocese, committed suicide two days after he was confronted by Joseph McDonald, one of his alleged sexual abuse victims from the 1960s. During that encounter, McDonald said he urged Reinecke to resign from the priesthood and seek professional help. In September 1992, Joseph T. O'Brien Jr. told the Washington Post that he had also been sexually molested by Reinecke around 1969.In February 2019, Burbidge released a list of sixteen diocesan priests who had been credibly accused of sexual abuse.

In October 2019, Christopher Mould, a diocesan priest, resigned his position after disclosing to Burbidge that he had “sexual contact with a minor” while serving at St. Thomas à Becket Church in Reston. This abuse occurred on one occasion sometime between 1992 and 1995. Burbidge announced the misconduct several days later in a letter to the diocese, noting that there had been no prior accusations of misconduct against Mould and that he had “expressed deep contrition for his actions.”

In March 2020, the priest Scott Asalone was arrested on charges of sexually abusing Washington D.C. Councilman David Grosso when he was 14-years-old. The crimes took place at Saint Francis de Sales Parish in Purcellville in 1985. Asalone had been removed from public ministry by the diocese in 1993. Asalone was sentenced to eight years in prison in June 2023.

Antonio Pérez-Alcalá, a leader of a Catholic youth organization in McLean, was arrested in November 2021 on charges of sexually assaulting minors. Pérez-Alcalá's alleged victims claimed that he attacked them during mentoring sessions at his residence. He later pleaded guilty to one count of aggravated sexual battery and was sentenced to a ten year suspended sentence and five years of probation.

== Bishops ==
=== Bishops of Arlington ===
1. Thomas Jerome Welsh (1974–1983), appointed Bishop of Allentown
2. John Richard Keating (1983–1998), died in office
3. Paul S. Loverde (1999–2016)
4. Michael F. Burbidge (2016–present)

=== Other diocesan priest who became bishop ===
Antons Justs, appointed Bishop of Jelgava in 1995

== Parishes ==
=== Mission churches ===
The Diocese of Arlington operates two mission churches for the Diocese of San Juan de la Maguana in the Dominican Republic:

- Bánica Mission Parish (St. Francis of Assisi Church) in Bánica
- Pedro Santana Mission Parish in Pedro Santana

Both mission churches are overseen by the Arlington Dominican Mission.

== Education ==
As of 2026, the Diocese of Arlington operates four high schools, 37 elementary/middle schools and three pre-schools. The diocese contains three independently owned high schools and three elementary schools that adhere to the diocesan curriculum guidelines.

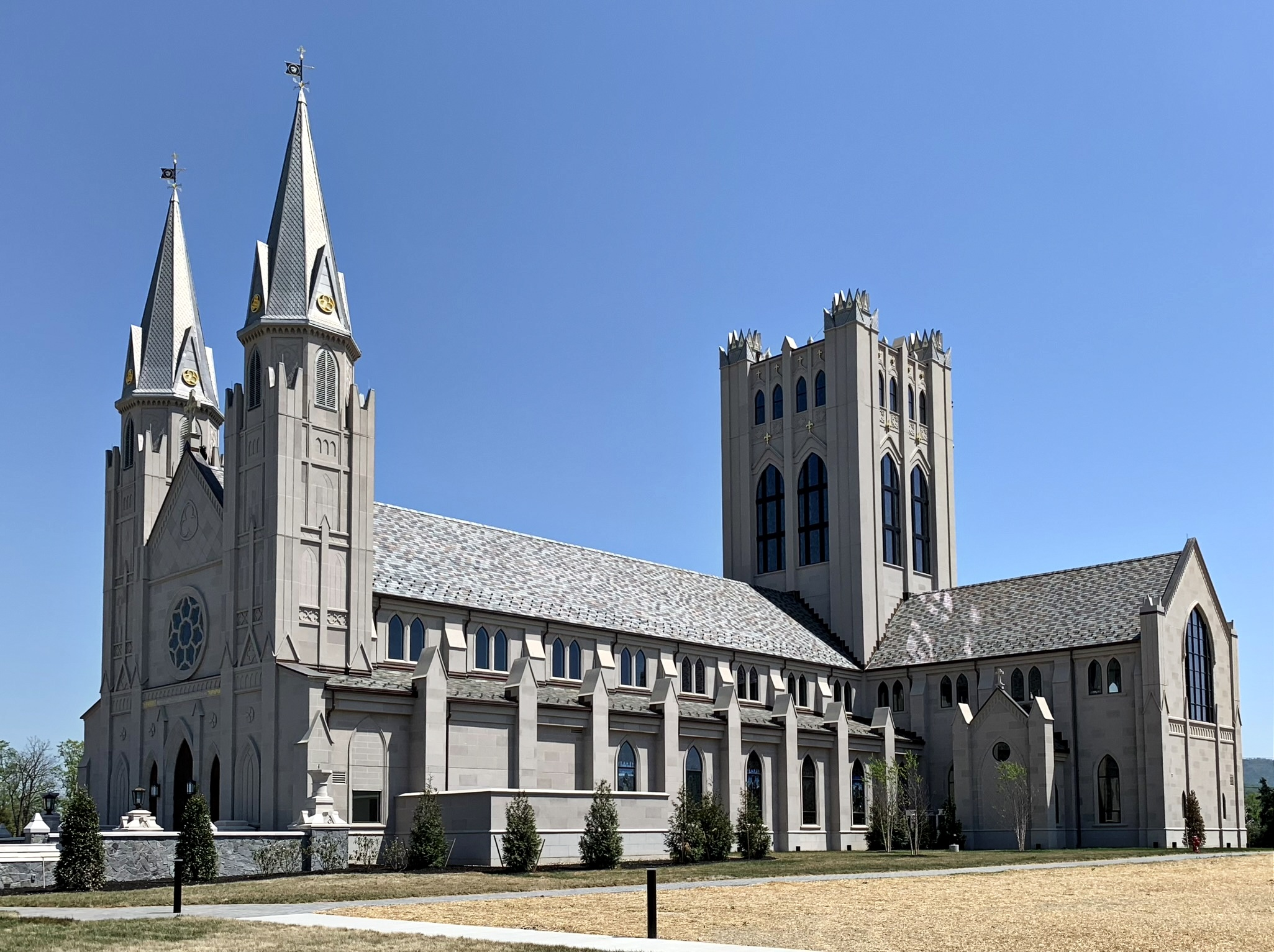
Christ the King Chapel at Christendom College, Front Royal, Virginia (2023)

=== High schools ===
==== Diocesan high schools ====
- Bishop Denis J. O'Connell High School – Arlington
- Bishop Ireton High School – Alexandria
- Saint John Paul the Great Catholic High School – Dumfries
- St. Paul VI Catholic High School – Chantilly

==== Independent high schools ====
- Chelsea Academy – Front Royal
- Seton School – Manassas
- St. Michael the Archangel High School – Fredericksburg

=== Colleges and universities ===
- Christendom College – Front Royal
- Divine Mercy University – Sterling
- Marymount University – Arlington

== Catholic Charities ==
The Diocese of Arlington coordinates and supports a range of charitable activities focused on assistance to the vulnerable, fund-raising and education. Initiatives include counseling, prison visits and foster care. Archduchess Kathleen of Habsburg-Lorraine is a former communications director of the CCDA.
