= Confederate Memorial Chapel =

- U.S. National Register of Historic Places
- Virginia Landmarks Register
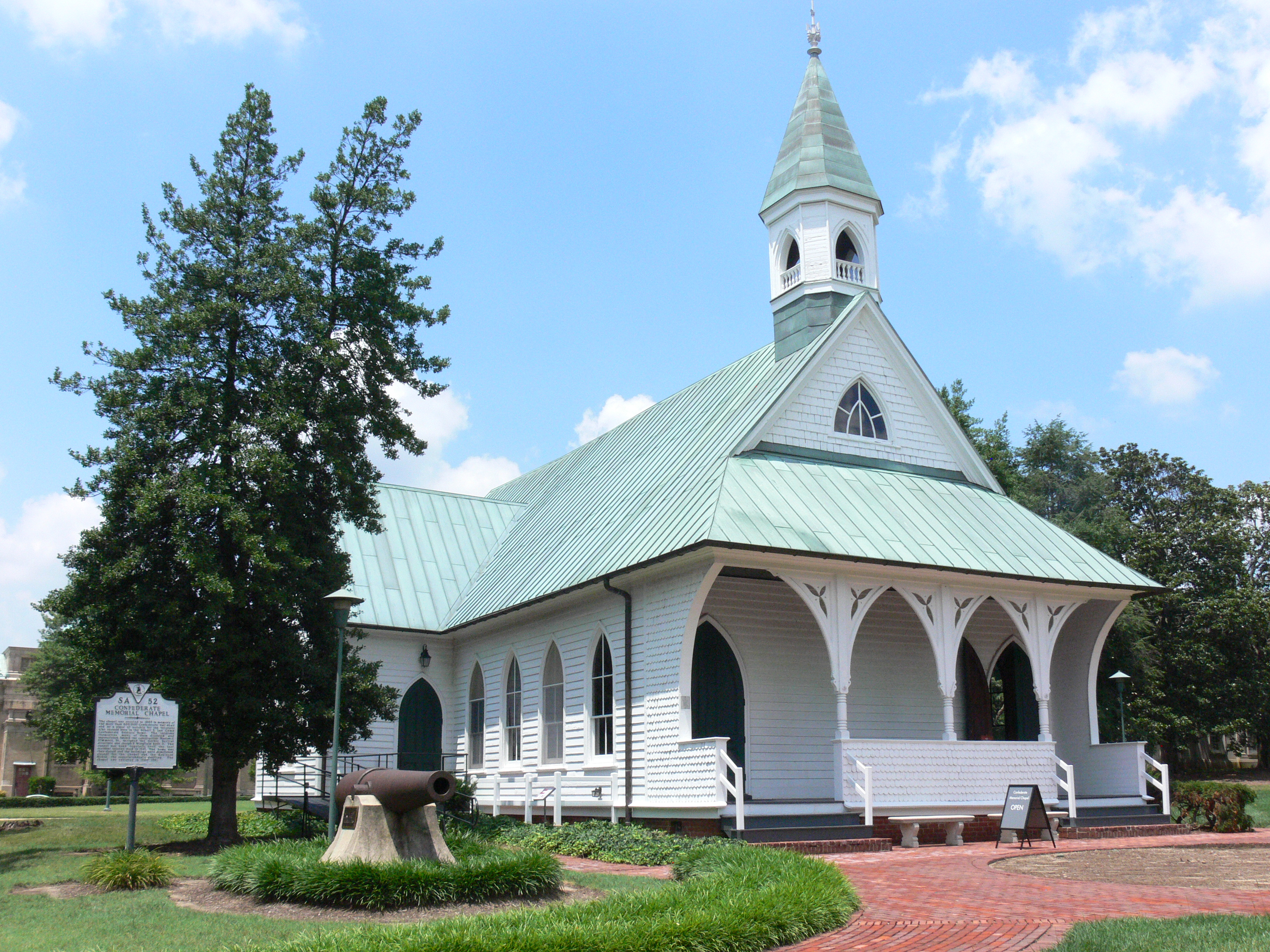
- Confederate Memorial Chapel, July 2011

- Location within Virginia Location within the United States
- Location: 2900 Grove Ave., Richmond, Virginia
- Coordinates: 37°33′20″N 77°28′33″W
- Area: 9.9 acres (4.0 ha)
- Built: 1887
- Built by: Joseph F. Wingfield
- Architect: Marion J. Dimmock
- Architectural style: Gothic Revival
- NRHP reference No.: 72001520
- VLR No.: 127-0224

Significant dates
- Added to NRHP: February 23, 1972
- Designated VLR: November 16, 1971

Confederate Memorial Chapel is a historic interdenominational memorial chapel located in Richmond, Virginia. Dedicated on May 8, 1887, it is a white frame, Gothic Revival style structure with a clipped gable roof of grey tin and a belfry. The chapel's construction was funded by private citizens, veterans, and the proceeds from benefit auctions of donated tobacco, totaling $4,000.

The chapel served as a place of worship for the R. E. Lee Camp Confederate Soldiers' Home, which was the nation's first successful and longest operating residential complex for Confederate veterans of the Civil War.

Not only did the chapel represent a place of worship, but it also played a significant role in the daily lives of those that lived at the soldiers' home as the structure served as an auditorium for lectures, concerts, and meeting. The chapel also held the distinction for holding approximately 1,700 funeral services.

The chapel's interior is of pine with vaulted ceilings. Rows of hand-hewn pews face a raised chancel furnished with gothic revival chairs, lectern, and pulpit. These are then framed by a soaring three-arch opening inscribed with gilded lettering. The central arch proclaims: "This Chapel is Dedicated to the Memory of the Confederate Dead" and its flanking arches state: "In this Place Will I Give Peace" / "Saith the Lord of Hosts."

The sides of the chapel also features eight commemorative stained glass windows manufactured by the Belcher Mosaic Company which all date back to the 19th century and are dedicated to the soldiers and/or battalions of the Confederacy.

It was listed on the National Register of Historic Places in 1972.
