= Cappella gentilizia =

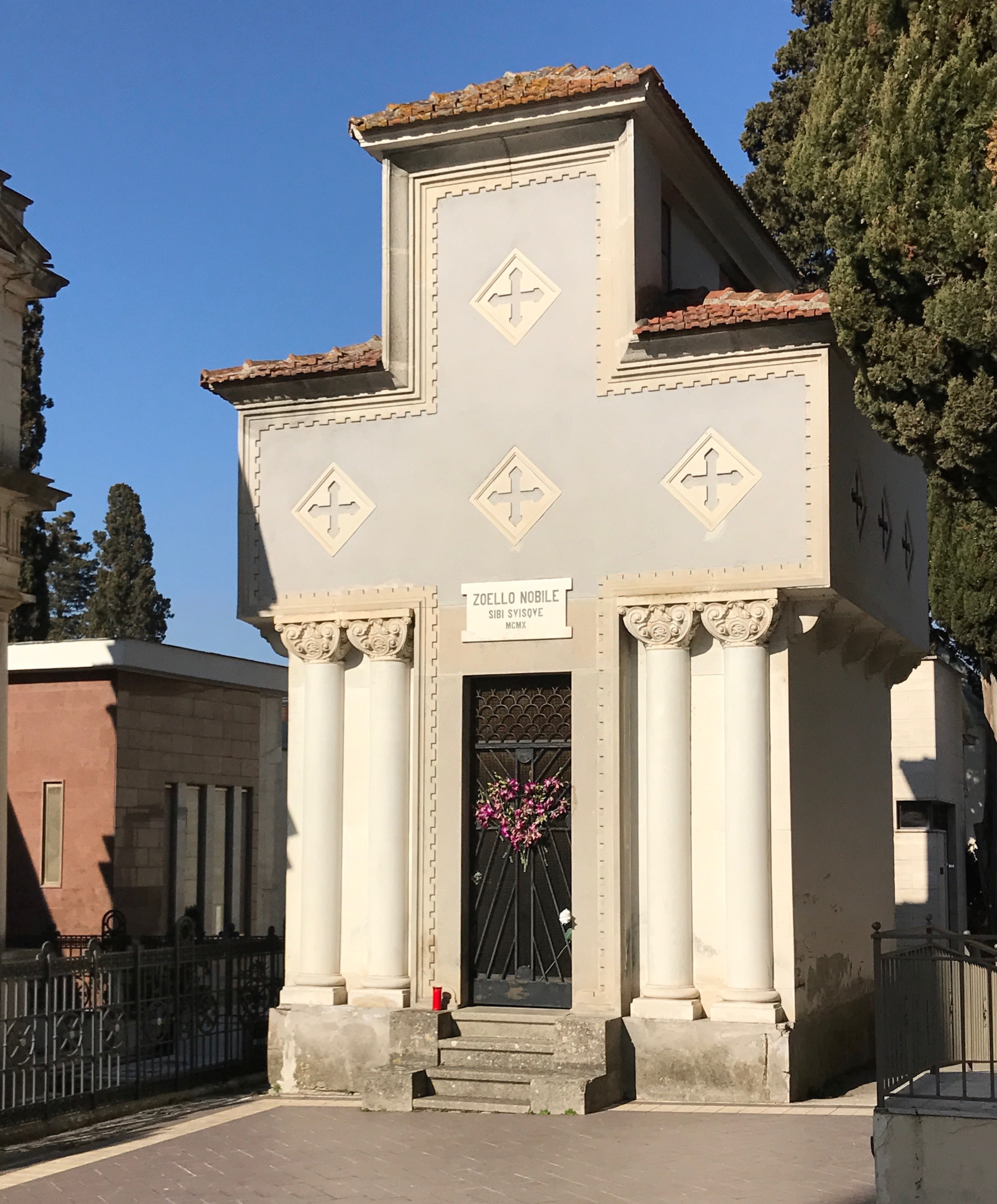
Cappella gentilizia in Benevento, Italy

A cappella gentilizia or cappella familiare (the latter term literally translated as "family chapel") is a type of freestanding private cemetery chapel commonly found in the cemeteries of Italy.

The cappella gentilizia is built as a final resting place and used for burial for members of one family. It can be compared to a small, modest mausoleum.

Cappelle gentilizie are built within cemeteries. Specific areas within a given cemetery are designated by local municipal authorities for the construction of these private mortuary chapels.

From a legal standpoint, the right to burial in a cappella gentilizia is based on kinship. This right belongs to either the immediate or the extended family of the chapel's founder, based on the will expressed by the founder in the deed of foundation. The right of burial in the family's cappella gentilizia is non-transferable and inalienable.

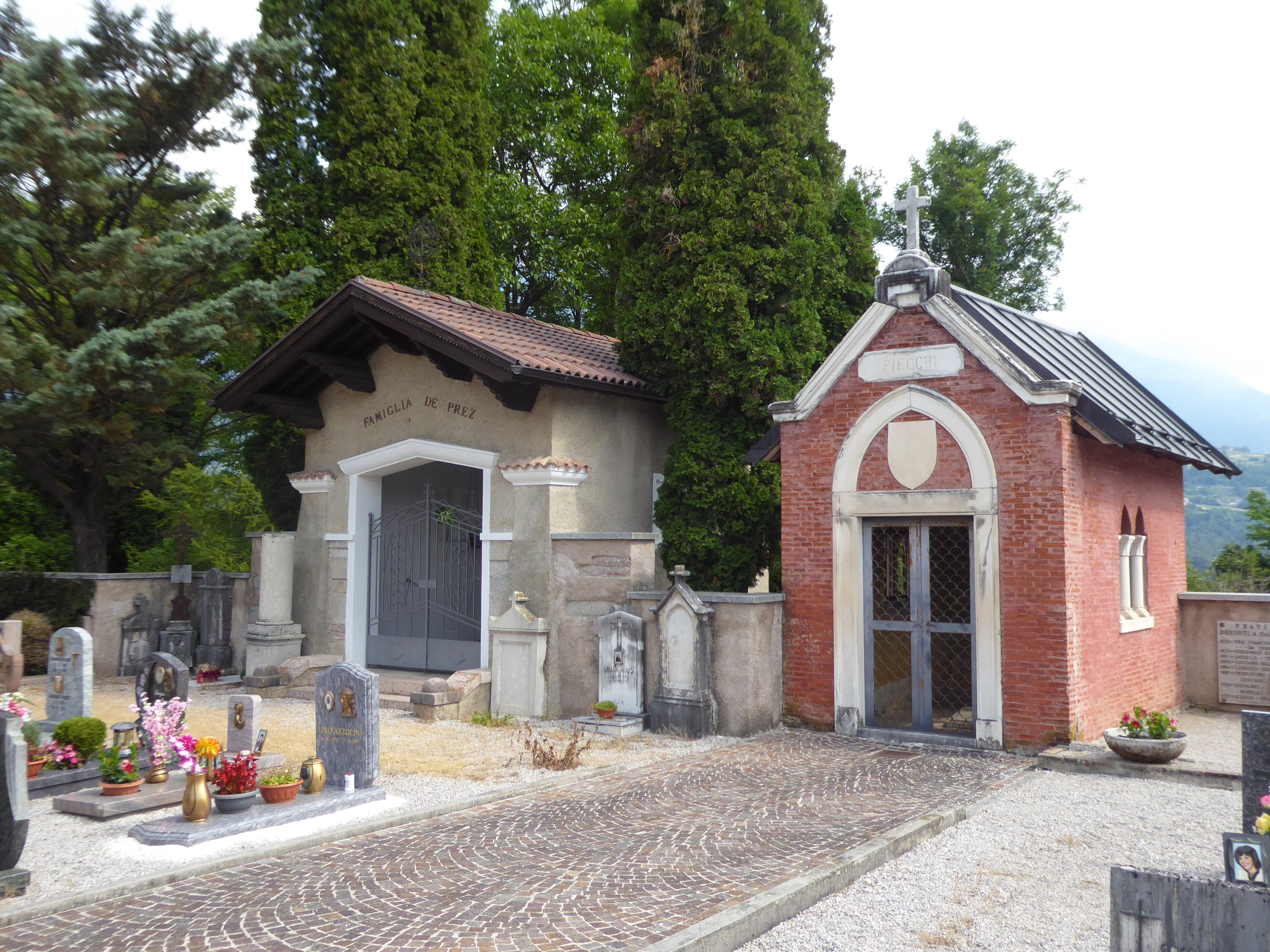
Cappelle gentilizie in the cemetery of Campo Lomaso

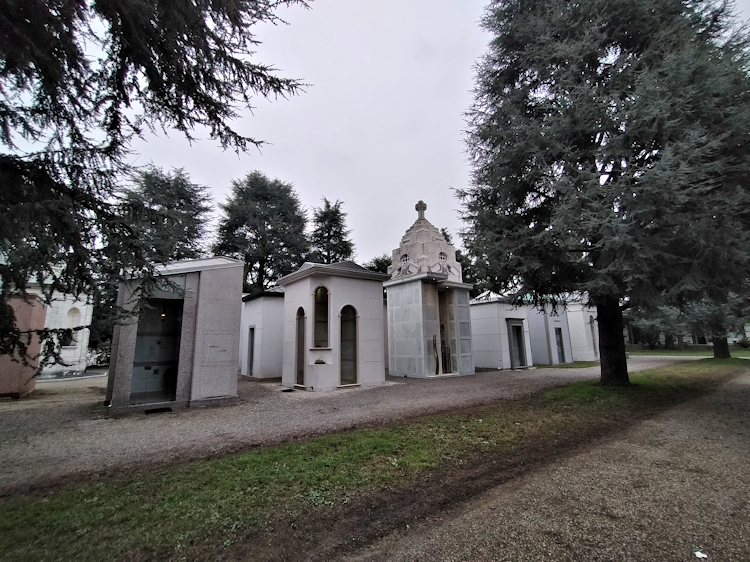
Cappelle gentilizie in the Maggiore cemetery in Crema

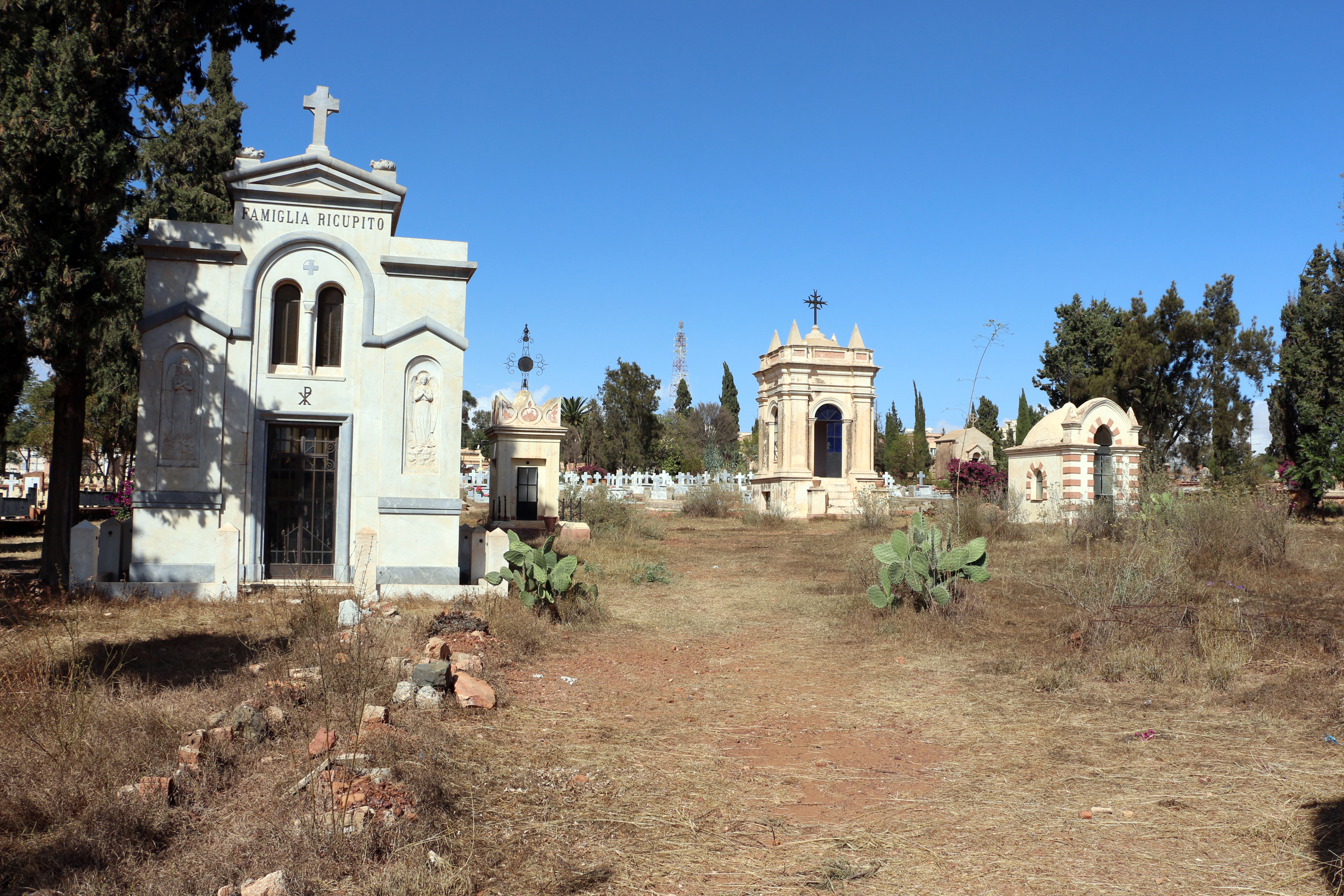
Cappelle gentilizie in the Italian cemetery in Asmara, Eritrea

== See also ==
- Grabkapelle
