= Chapel =

Christian place of prayer and worship

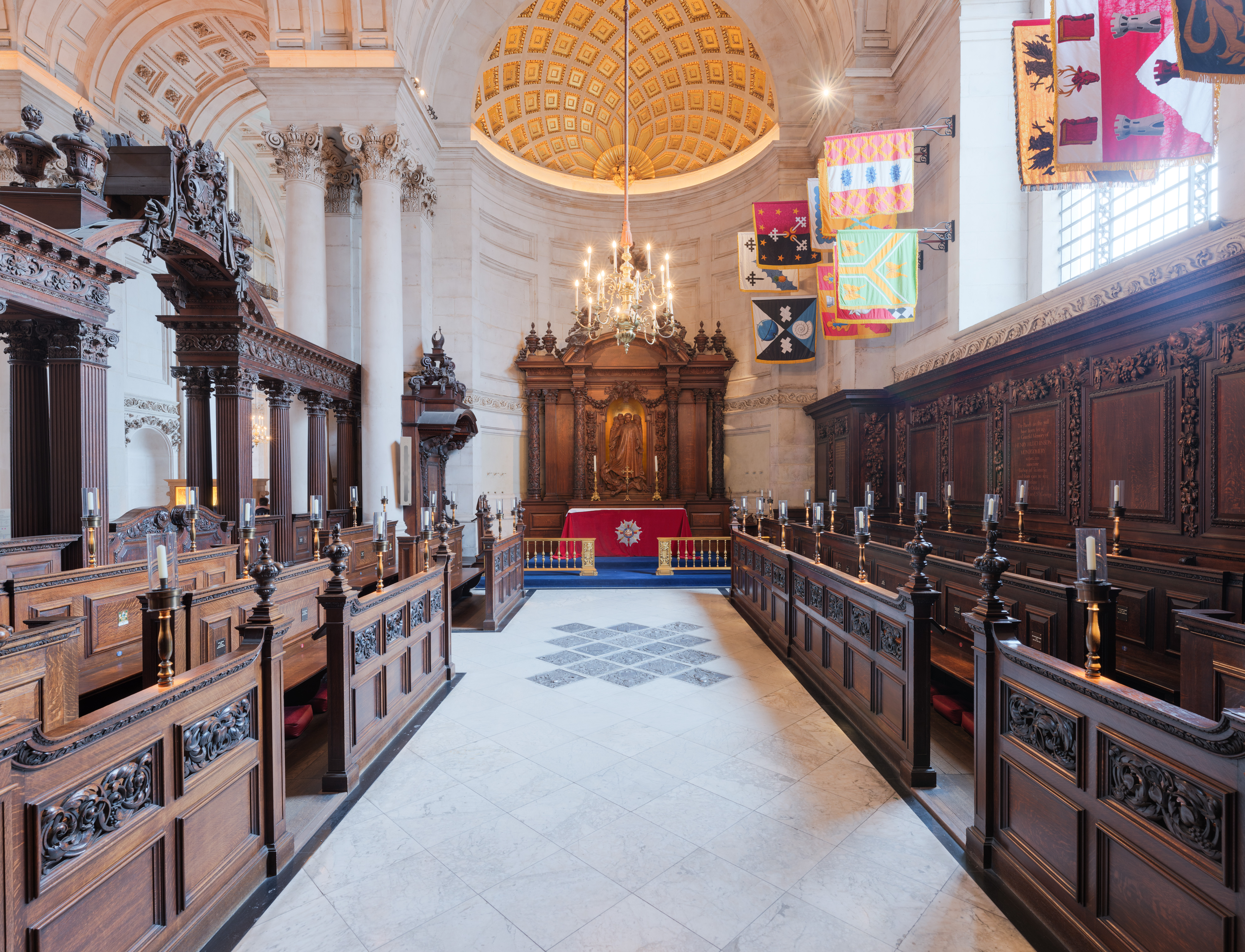
Chapel of St Michael and St George at St Paul's Cathedral in London

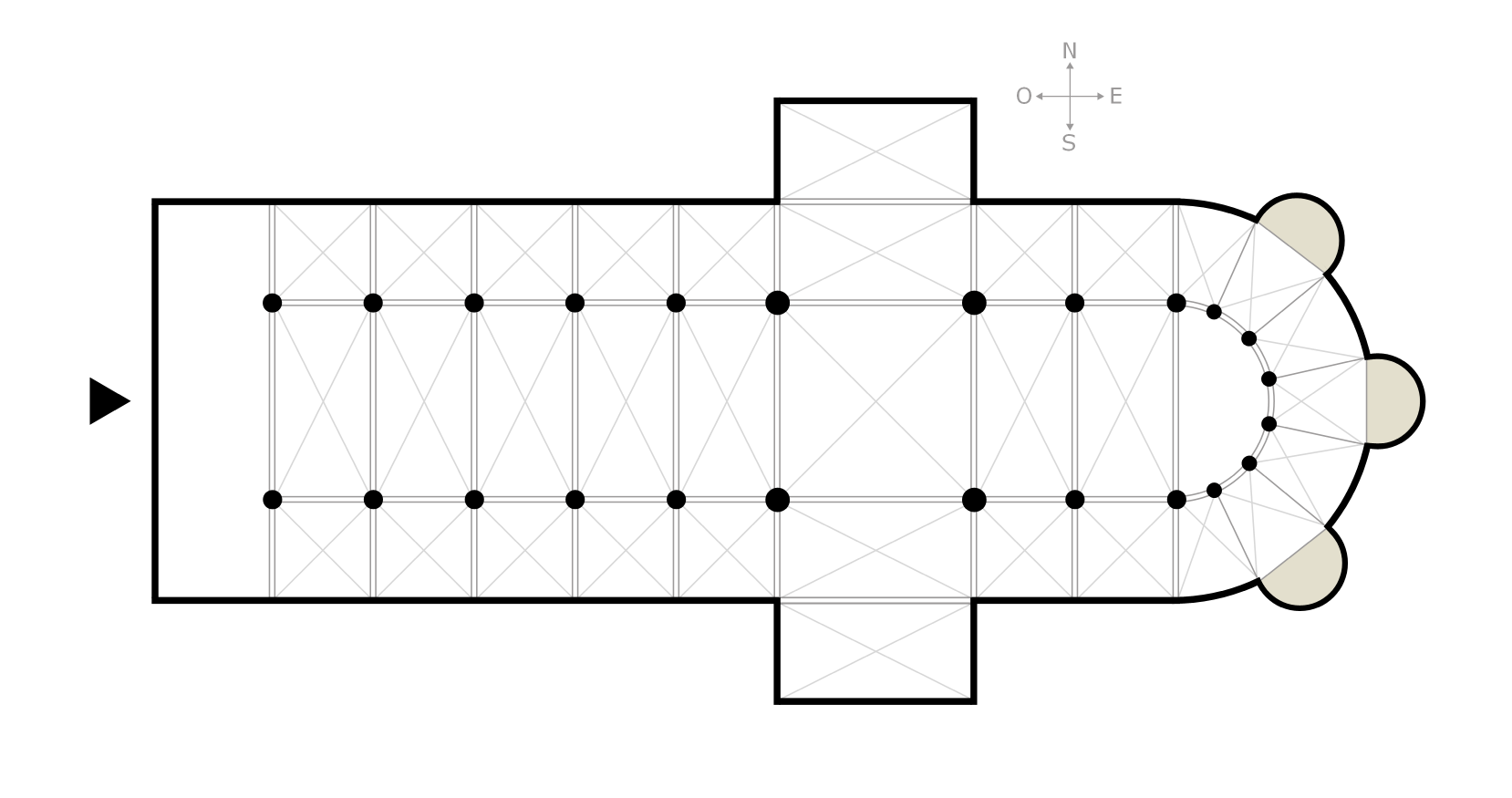
Schematic rendering of typical "side chapels" in the apse of a cathedral, surrounding the ambulatory

A chapel (from Latin: cappella, a diminutive of cappa, meaning "little cape") is a Christian place of prayer and worship that is usually relatively small. The term has several meanings. First, smaller spaces inside a church that have their own altar are often called chapels; the Lady chapel is a common type of these. Second, a chapel is a place of worship, sometimes interfaith, that is part of a building, complex, or vessel with some other main purpose, such as a school, college, hospital, palace or large aristocratic house, castle, barracks, prison, funeral home, cemetery, hotel, airport, or military or commercial ship. Third, chapels are small places of worship, built as satellite sites by a church or monastery, for example in remote areas; these are often called a chapel of ease. A feature of all these types is that often no clergy are permanently resident or specifically attached to the chapel.

For historical reasons, chapel is also often the term used by independent or nonconformist denominations for their places of worship in England and especially in Wales, even where they are large and in practice operate like a parish church.

The earliest Christian places of worship are now often referred to as chapels, as they were not dedicated buildings but rather a dedicated chamber within a building. Most larger churches had one or more secondary altars which, if they occupied a distinct space, would often be called a chapel. In Russian Orthodox tradition, the chapels were built underneath city gates, where most people could visit them; a famous example is the Iberian Chapel.

Although chapels frequently refer to Christian places of worship, they are also found in Jewish synagogues and do not necessarily denote a specific denomination. In England—where the Church of England is established by law—interdenominational or interfaith chapels in such institutions may be consecrated by the local Anglican bishop. Chapels that are not affiliated with a particular denomination are commonly encountered as part of a non-religious institution such as a hospital, airport, university or prison. Many military installations have chapels for the use of military personnel, normally under the leadership of a military chaplain.

== History ==
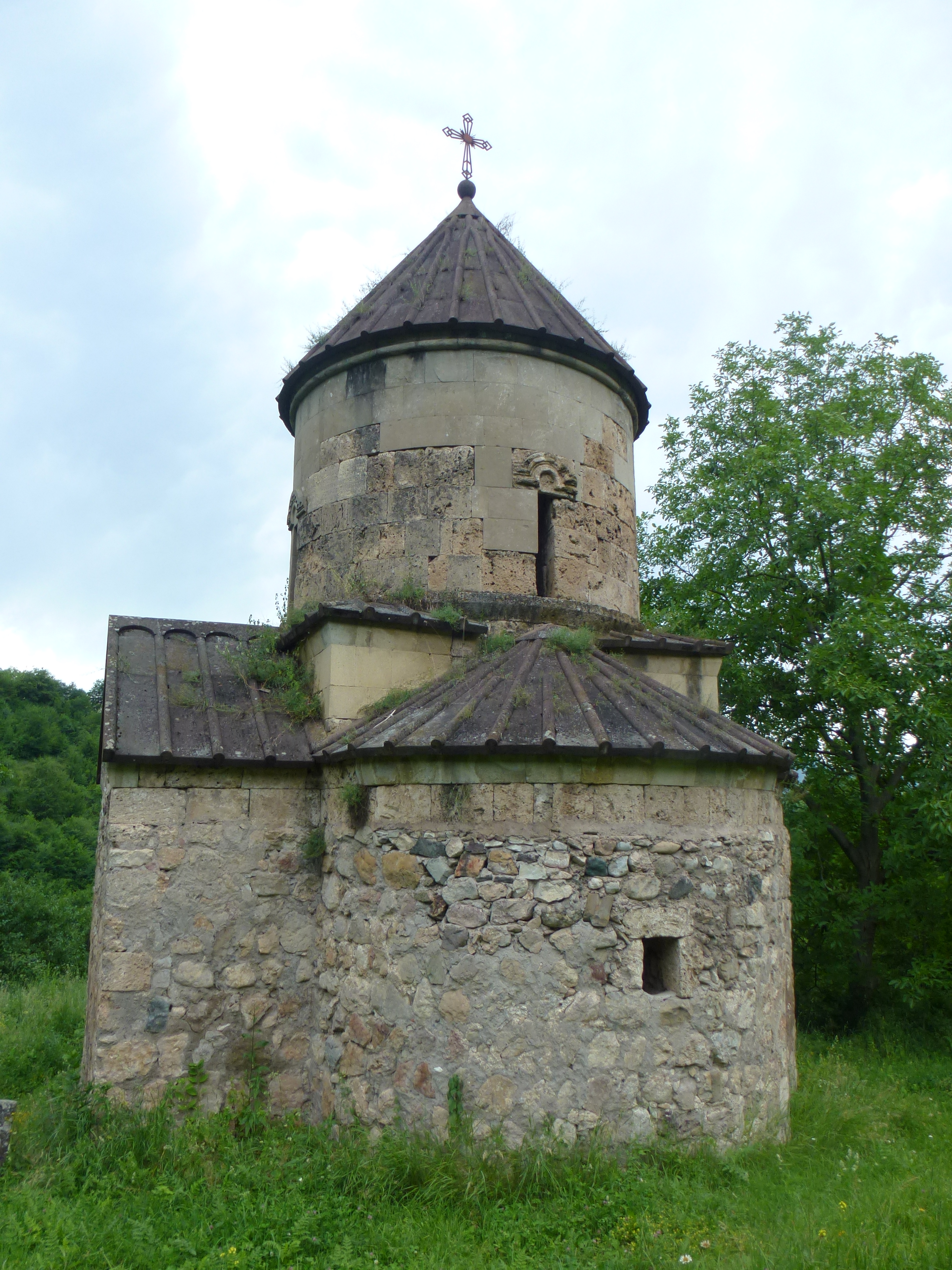
The Tsrviz Chapel in Armenia, one of the oldest chapels in the world

The earliest Christian places of worship were not dedicated buildings but rather a dedicated chamber within a building, such as a room in an individual's home. Here, one or two people could pray without being part of a communion or congregation. People who like to use chapels may find it peaceful and relaxing to be away from the stress of life, without other people moving around them.

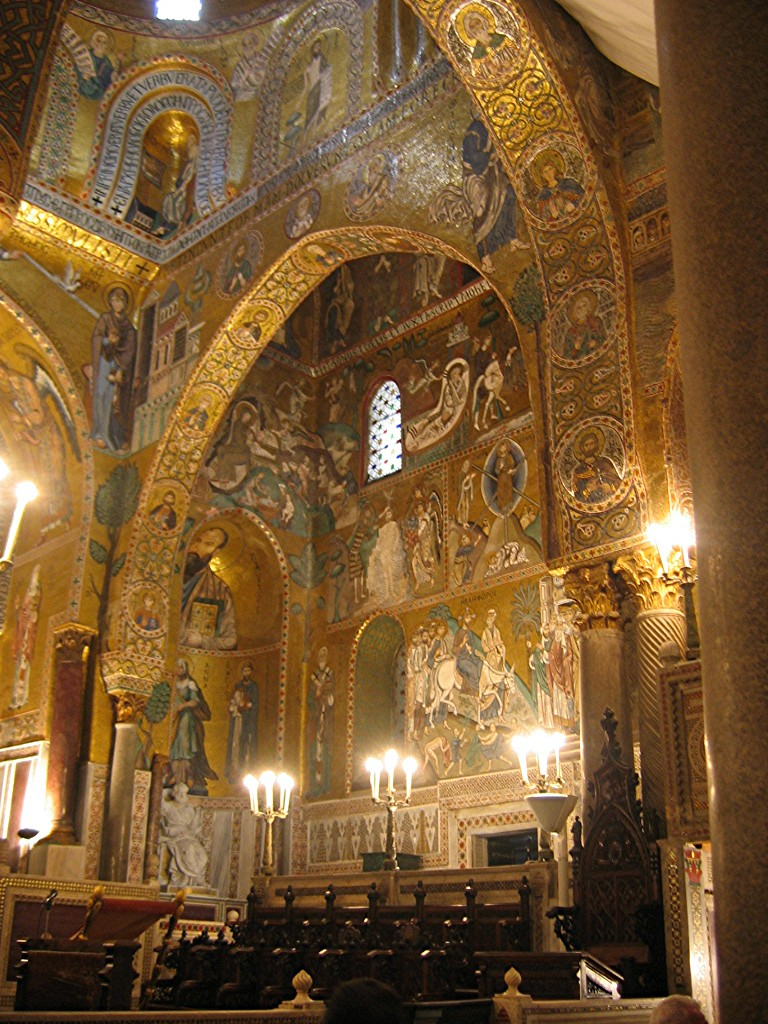
The Cappella Palatina in Palermo, Italy (pictured), and the Palatine Chapel in Aachen, two of the most famous palace chapels of Europe

The word chapel, like the associated word chaplain, is ultimately derived from Latin. More specifically, the word is derived from a relic of Saint Martin of Tours: traditional stories about Martin relate that while he was still a soldier, he cut his military cloak in half to give part to a beggar in need. The other half he wore over his shoulders as a "small cape" (Latin: cappella). The beggar, the stories claim, was Christ in disguise, and Martin experienced a conversion of heart, becoming first a monk, then abbot, then bishop. This cape came into the possession of the Frankish kings, and they kept the relic with them as they did battle. The tent which kept the cape was called the capella and the priests who said daily Mass in the tent were known as the capellani. From these words, via Old French, we get the names "chapel" and "chaplain".

The word also appears in the Irish language (Gaelic) in the Middle Ages, as Welsh people came with the Norman and Old English invaders to the island of Ireland. While the traditional Irish word for church was eaglais (derived from ecclesia), a new word, séipéal (from cappella), came into usage.

In British history, "chapel" and "meeting house" were formerly the standard designations for church buildings belonging to independent or Nonconformist religious societies and their members. They were particularly associated with the pre-eminence of independent religious practice in rural parts of England and Wales, the northern industrial towns of the late 18th and 19th centuries, and centres of population close to but outside the City of London. As a result, "chapel" is sometimes used as an adjective in England and Wales to describe members of such churches: for example in the sentence, "I'm Chapel."

== Modern usage ==
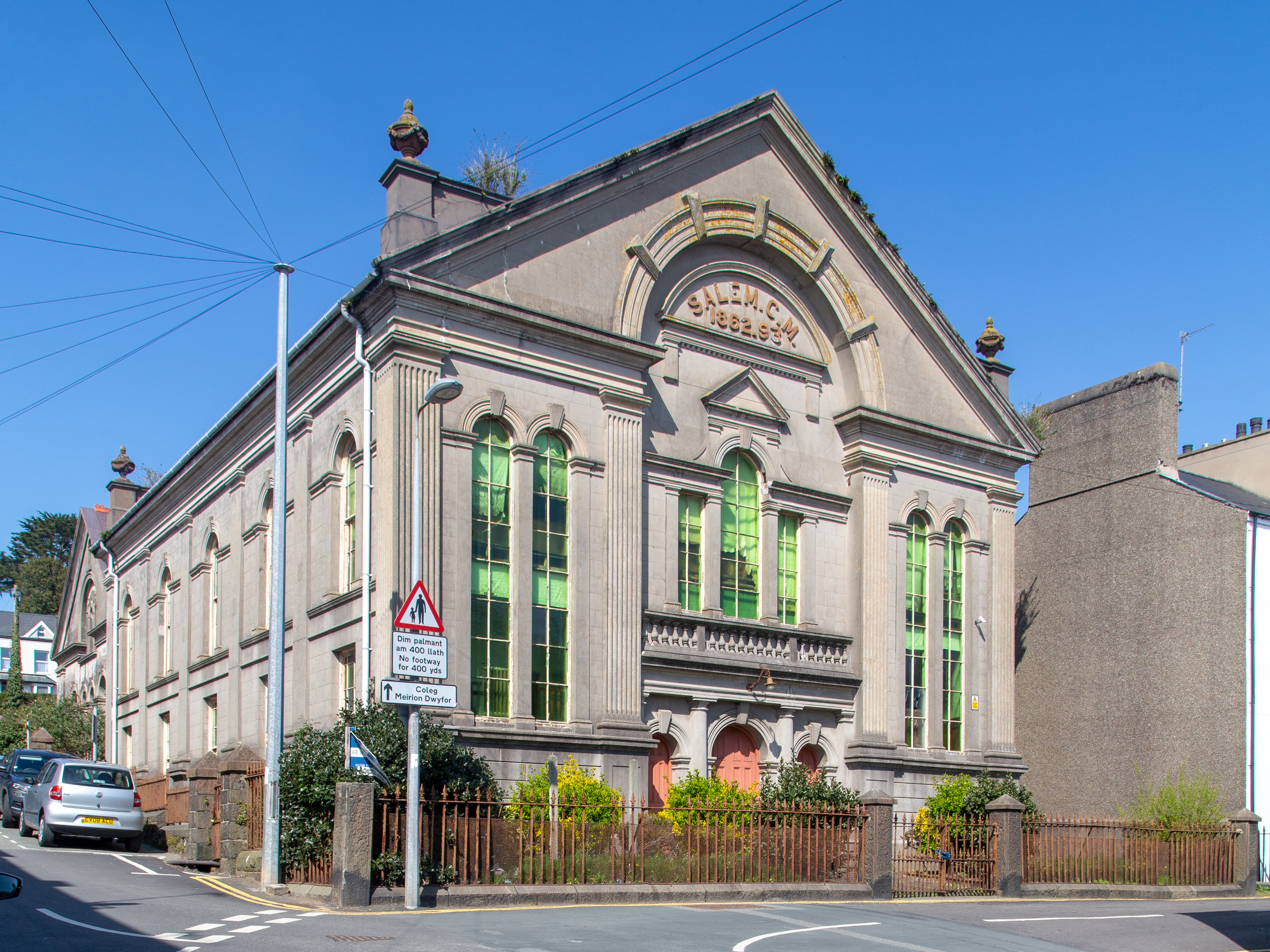
Capel Salem, a nonconformist chapel in Pwllheli, Wales. Unlike earlier types of chapel, this chapel is not attached to a larger place of worship.

While the word chapel is not exclusively limited to Christian terminology, it is most often found in that context. Nonetheless, the word's meaning can vary by denomination, and non-denominational chapels (sometimes called "meditation rooms") can be found in many hospitals, airports, and even the United Nations headquarters. Chapels can also be found for worship in Judaism.

"Chapel" is in particularly common usage in the United Kingdom, and especially in Wales, for Nonconformist places of worship; and in Scotland and Ireland for Catholic churches. In England and Wales, due to the rise in Nonconformist chapels during the late 18th and early 19th centuries, by the time of the 1851 census, more people attended the independent chapels than attended the state religion's Anglican churches. (The Anglican Church does not function as the established church in Scotland.)

In Catholic Church canon law, a chapel, technically called an "oratory", is a building or part thereof dedicated to the celebration of services, particularly the Mass, which is not a parish church. This may be a private chapel, for the use of one person or a select group (a bishop's private chapel, or the chapel of a convent, for instance); a semi-public oratory, which is partially available to the general public (a seminary chapel that welcomes visitors to services, for instance); or a public oratory (for instance, a hospital or university chapel).

== Types of chapel ==
Chapels that are built as part of a larger church are holy areas set aside for some specific use or purpose: for instance, many cathedrals and large churches have a "Lady chapel" in the apse, dedicated to the Virgin Mary; parish churches may have such a Lady chapel in a side aisle or a "chapel of Reservation" or "Blessed Sacrament chapel" where the consecrated bread of the Eucharist is kept in reserve between services, for the purpose of taking Holy Communion to the sick and housebound and, in some Christian traditions, for devotional purposes.

Other common uses of the word chapel today include:

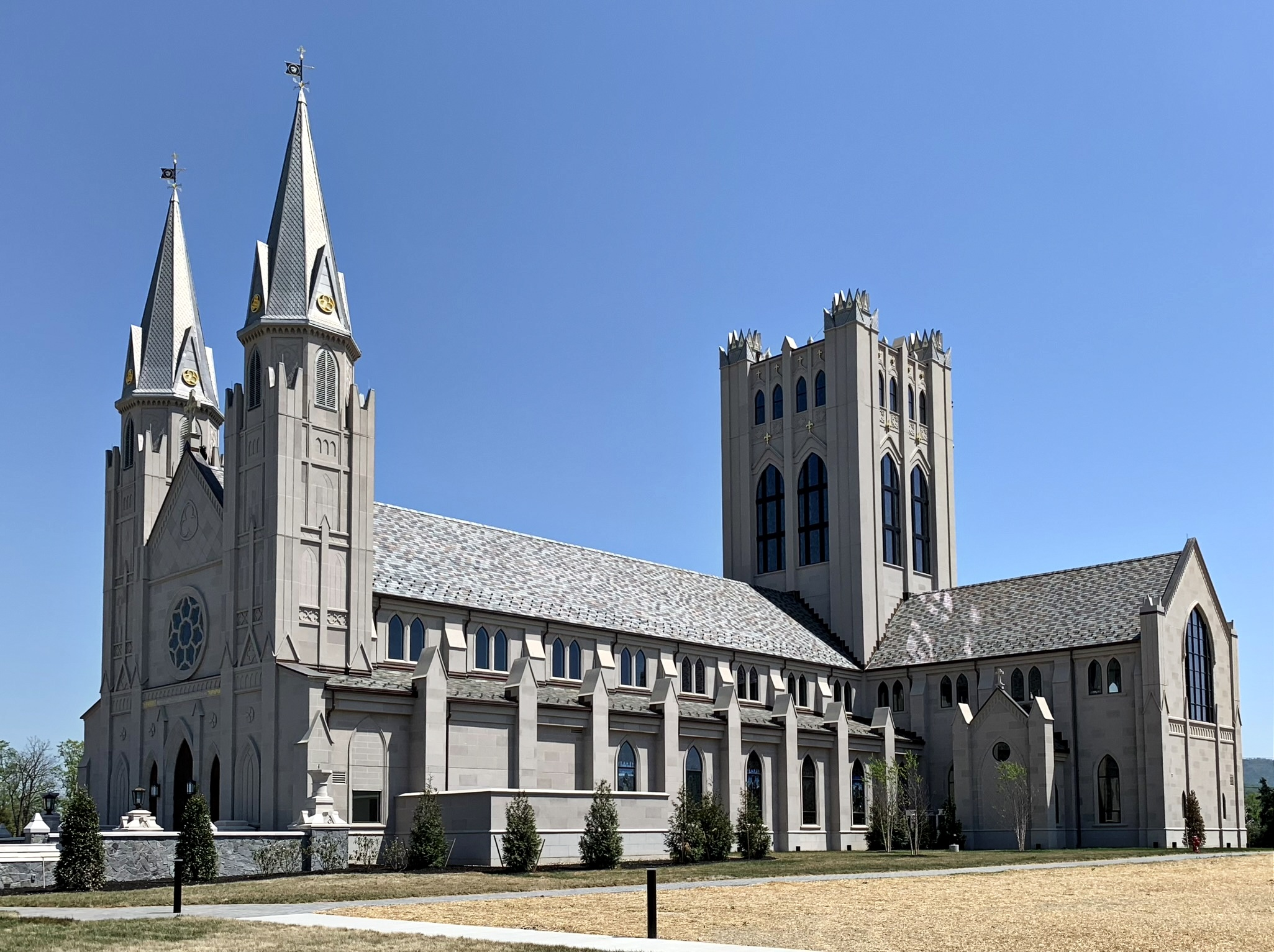
Christ the King Chapel on the campus of Christendom College is an example of a college chapel.

- Airport chapel: the first airport chapel was created in 1951 in Boston for airport workers but grew to include travelers. It was originally Catholic, but chapels today are often multifaith.
- Ambassador's chapel – originally created to allow ambassadors from Catholic countries to worship whilst on duty in Protestant countries.
- Bishop's chapel – in Anglican and Catholic canon law, bishops have the right to have a chapel in their own home, even when travelling (such personal chapels may be granted only as a favor to other priests)
- A bridge chapel is a small place of Christian worship, built either on, or immediately adjacent to, a road bridge; they were commonly established during pre-Reformation mediaeval era in Europe. Some chantry chapels are bridge chapels, e.g. the Chantry Chapel of St Mary the Virgin, Wakefield
- A castle chapel, in European architecture, is a chapel built within a castle.
- A capilla abierta (open chapel) is one of the most distinct Mexican church construction forms, mostly built in the 16th century during the early colonial period.
- Cappella gentilizia - a type of private mortuary chapel used for burials; commonly found in the cemeteries of Italy.
- Cemetery chapel - an indoor venue in a cemetery where families, friends and clergy gather for funeral services including music, eulogies, Scriptural reading, pastoral prayers and intimate reflection (moments of silence). It additionally protects them from rain, summertime heat or cold wintry weather.
- Chapel of ease – constructed in large parishes to allow parishioners easy access to a church or chapel.
- Chapel of rest – not a place of worship as such, but a comfortably decorated room in a funeral director's premises, where family and friends can view the deceased before a funeral.
- College chapel - located on college or university campuses that are or were once affiliated with a religion
- A court chapel is a chapel as a musical ensemble associated with a royal or noble court. Most of these are royal (court) chapels, but when the ruler of the court is not a king, the more generic "court chapel" is used, for instance for an imperial court.
- Family chapel - private chapel for royal families and other wealthy families.
- Funeral chapel – a venue for funerals or memorial services/celebrations of life at a funeral home. In the case of cremation ceremonies, families and visitors would gather in a crematorium.
- Hospital chapel – location for praying for the sick or recently deceased. It can be used for memorial services or celebrations of life.
- Mausoleum chapel, also known as a Chapel mausoleum: a cemetery chapel featuring above ground crypts where families, friends and clergy gather for funeral services including Scriptural reading, eulogies, pastoral prayers and intimate reflection (moments of silence). It additionally keeps them from enduring weather conditions of summertime heat, cold wintry weather or rain.
- Military chapel – U.S. military bases often have chapels designated for use by varying denominations. As no specific denomination or faith is the "owner", such a site is commonly referred to as a chapel instead of a church, mosque, or synagogue. Service members can often receive services for nondenominational Christian, Catholic, Islamic, and Jewish faiths, as well as information for other services in the local area.
- Multifaith chapel – found within hospitals, airports and universities, etc.; often converted from being exclusively Christian.
- A proprietary chapel is one that originally belonged to a private individual. They were common in the 19th century, often being built to cope with urbanisation. Frequently they were established by evangelical philanthropists with a vision of spreading Christianity in cities whose needs could no longer be met by the parishes. Some functioned more privately, with a wealthy person building a chapel so that they could invite their favorite preachers. They are anomalies in the English ecclesiastical law, having no parish area, but being permitted to have an Anglican clergyman licensed there. Historically many Anglican churches were proprietary chapels. Over the years they have often been converted into normal parishes.
- A royal chapel is a chapel associated with a monarch, a royal court, or in a royal palace.
- A school chapel is a chapel built in or associated with a school, historically found in Anglican or Catholic public schools in England and Wales
- A side chapel is a chapel within a cathedral or larger church building, often a place for quiet prayer or dedicated to a particular saint, or built to house religious objects such as relics. A parecclesion or parakklesion is a type of side chapel found in Byzantine architecture. A Lady chapel is really a form of side chapel: such chapels are common in the Catholic Church and the Anglican Communion. They are dedicated to the veneration of the Blessed Virgin Mary.
- A slipper chapel is small building where pilgrims used to remove their footwear before completing their pilgrimage into a cathedral, or place of worship.
- Summer chapel – a small church in a resort area that functions only during the summer when vacationers are present.
- Wayside chapel or country chapel – small chapels in the countryside
- Wedding chapel – a venue for weddings.

== Notable chapels ==
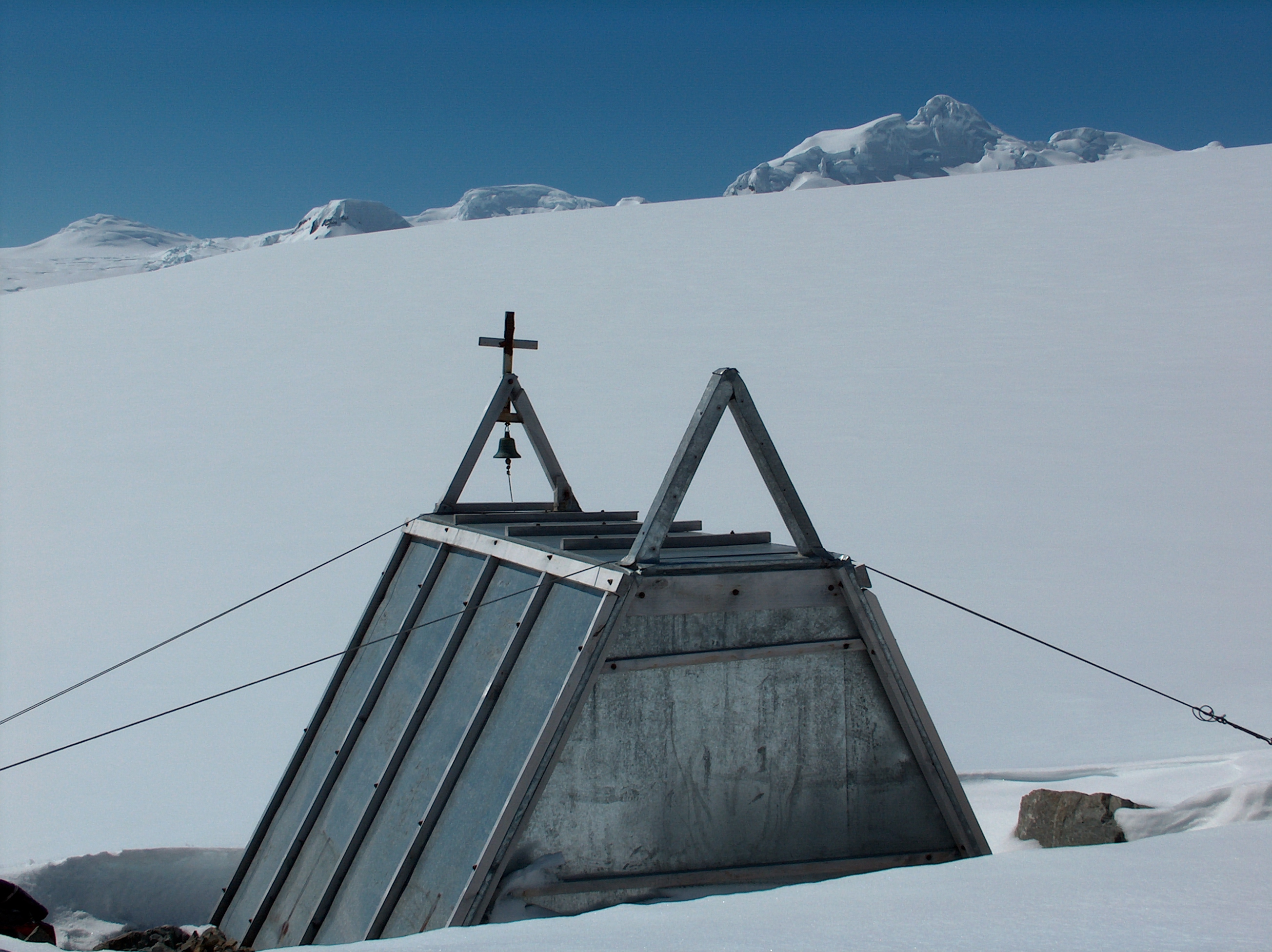
The old premises of St. Ivan Rilski Chapel in Antarctica

Notable chapels
Chapel	Year	Location
Bethesda Methodist Chapel	1887	Hanley, Staffordshire, England
Boardwalk Chapel	1945	The Wildwoods, New Jersey, United States
Brancacci Chapel	1386	Church of Santa Maria del Carmine, Florence, Italy
Christ Church Cathedral, Oxford	1160–1200	It is also the chapel of Christ Church, a college of the University of Oxford. This dual role as cathedral and college chapel is unique in the Church of England.
Chigi Chapel	1507–1661	Church of Santa Maria del Popolo, Rome, Italy
Contarelli Chapel	1585	Church of San Luigi dei Francesi, Rome, Italy
Duke Chapel	1932	Duke University, Durham, North Carolina, United States
Eton College Chapel	1440 – c. 1460	Eton College, Eton, Berkshire, England
Chapelle expiatoire	1824	Paris, France
Gallus Chapel	1330–1340	Greifensee ZH, Switzerland
Heinz Memorial Chapel	1938	University of Pittsburgh, Pittsburgh, Pennsylvania, United States
Henry VII Chapel	1503	Westminster Abbey, London, England
Chapel of the Holy Shroud	1694	Turin, Italy
King's College Chapel	1446	King's College in the University of Cambridge, Cambridge, England
King's College Chapel	1831	King's College, London, England
Lancing College Chapel	1868	Lancing College, Lancing, West Sussex, England
Llandaff Oratory	1925	Van Reenen, South Africa
Marcùs Chapel	12th century	Plaça Marcùs, Barcelona, Spain
Magi Chapel	1459–1461	Palazzo Medici Riccardi, Florence, Italy
Medici Chapels	1519–1524; 1602	Church of San Lorenzo, Florence, Italy
Niccoline Chapel	1447–1449	Apostolic Palace, Vatican City
Notre-Dame du Haut	1955	Ronchamp, France
Palatine Chapel	786	Aachen Cathedral, Aachen, Germany
Palatine Chapel	1132	Palazzo dei Normanni, Palermo, Sicily, Italy
Pauline Chapel	1540	Apostolic Palace, Vatican City
Pazzi Chapel	c. 1442 – 1443	Church of Santa Croce, Florence, Italy
Pettit Memorial Chapel	1907	Belvidere, Illinois, United States
Queen's Chapel	1623	St James's Palace, London, England
Chapelle Rouge	15th century BC	Karnak, Egypt
Chapelle du Rosaire de Vence	1951	Vence, France
Rosary Chapel	1531–1690	Puebla City, Puebla, Mexico
Rosslyn Chapel	1440	Roslin, Midlothian, Scotland
Rothko Chapel	1964	Houston, Texas, United States
Royal Chapel of Granada	1517	Granada, Spain
Royal Chapel	designed 1748	Royal Palace of Madrid, Spain
Royal Chapel, Sweden	1754	Stockholm Palace, Sweden
Chapelle royale de Dreux	1816	Dreux, Eure-et-Loir, France
St. Aloysius Chapel	1884	Mangalore, India
St George's Chapel	1348	Windsor Castle, England
Chapel of Saint Helena	12th century	Church of the Holy Sepulchre, Jerusalem
St. Ivan Rilski Chapel	2003	Livingston Island, Antarctica
St. Joan of Arc Chapel	15th century	Relocated to Marquette University, Milwaukee, United States
St. Paul's Chapel	1766	New York City, United States
Chapel of St Peter-on-the-Wall	654	Bradwell-on-Sea, Essex, England
St Salvator's Chapel	1450	St Andrews University, St Andrews, Scotland
Sainte-Chapelle	1246	Île de la Cité, Paris, France
Sansevero Chapel	1590	Naples, Italy
Sassetti Chapel	1470	Church of Santa Trinita, Florence, Italy
Scrovegni Chapel	c. 1303 – 1305	Padua, Italy
Sigismund's Chapel	1519	Wawel Cathedral, Kraków, Poland
Sistine Chapel	1473	Apostolic Palace, Vatican City
Skull Chapel	1776	Kudowa, Silesia, Poland
Slipper Chapel	1340	Norfolk, England
Chapel of the Snows	1989	McMurdo Station, Ross Island, Antarctica
Tabernacle Chapel	1874–1877	Morriston, Swansea, Wales
Chapelle de la Trinité	1622	Lyon, France
University Chapel	1867	Washington and Lee University, Lexington, Virginia, US
Chapels of Versailles	17th–18th centuries	Palace of Versailles, France

== Gallery ==
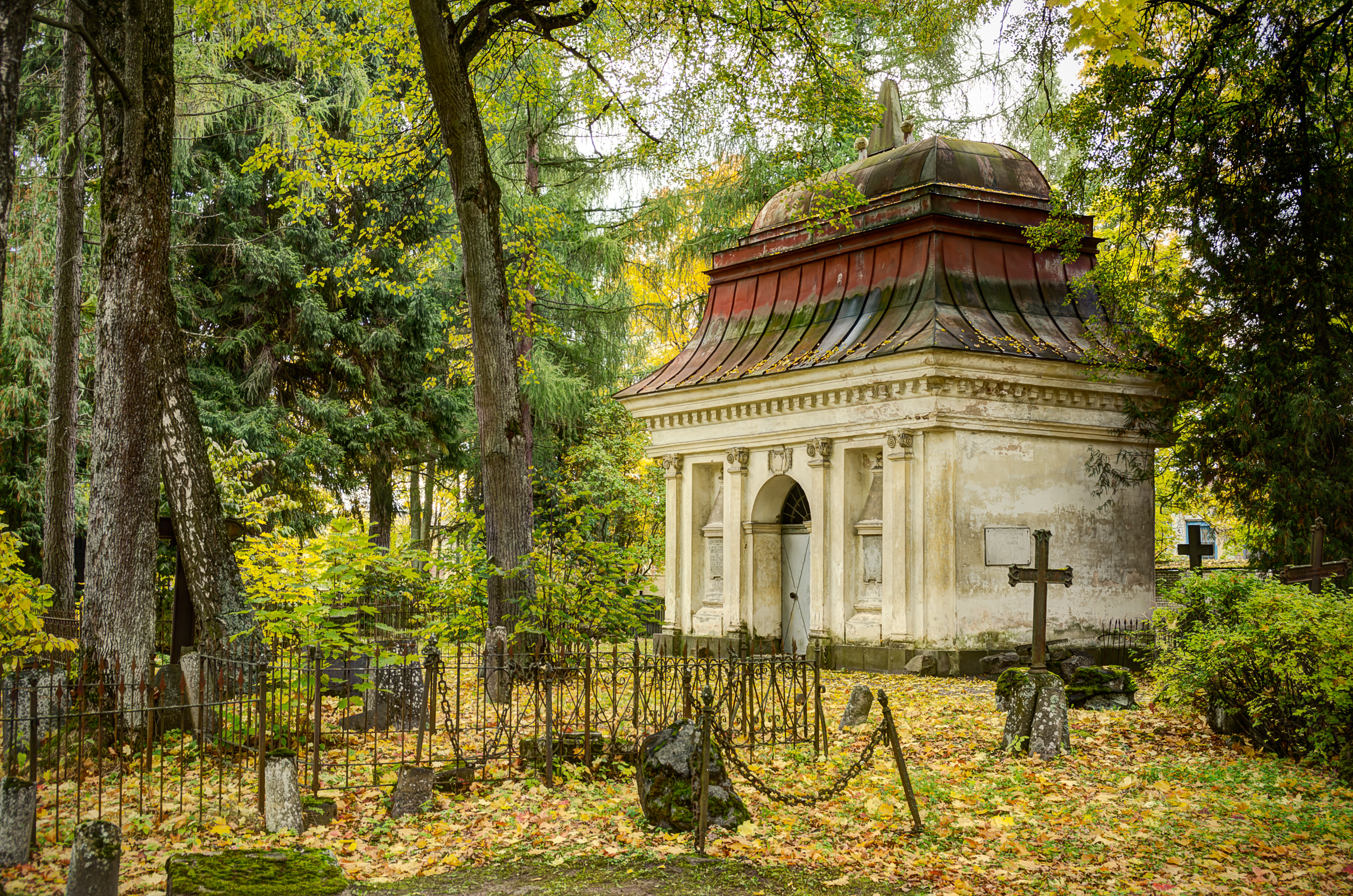
Teller Chapel in Tartu, Estonia

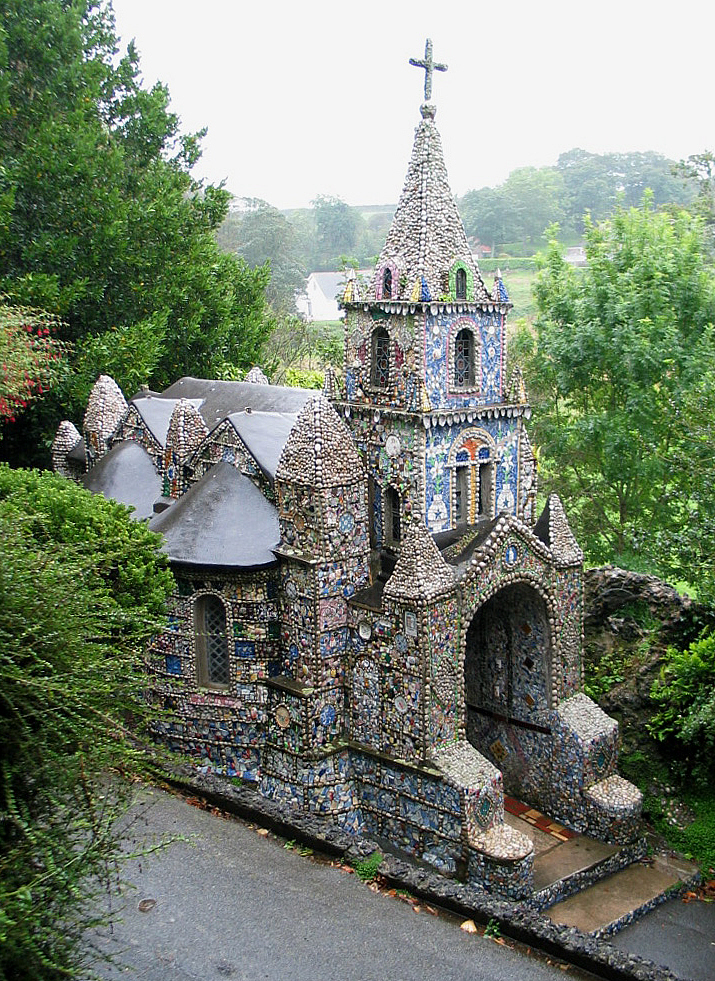
The Little Chapel, Guernsey

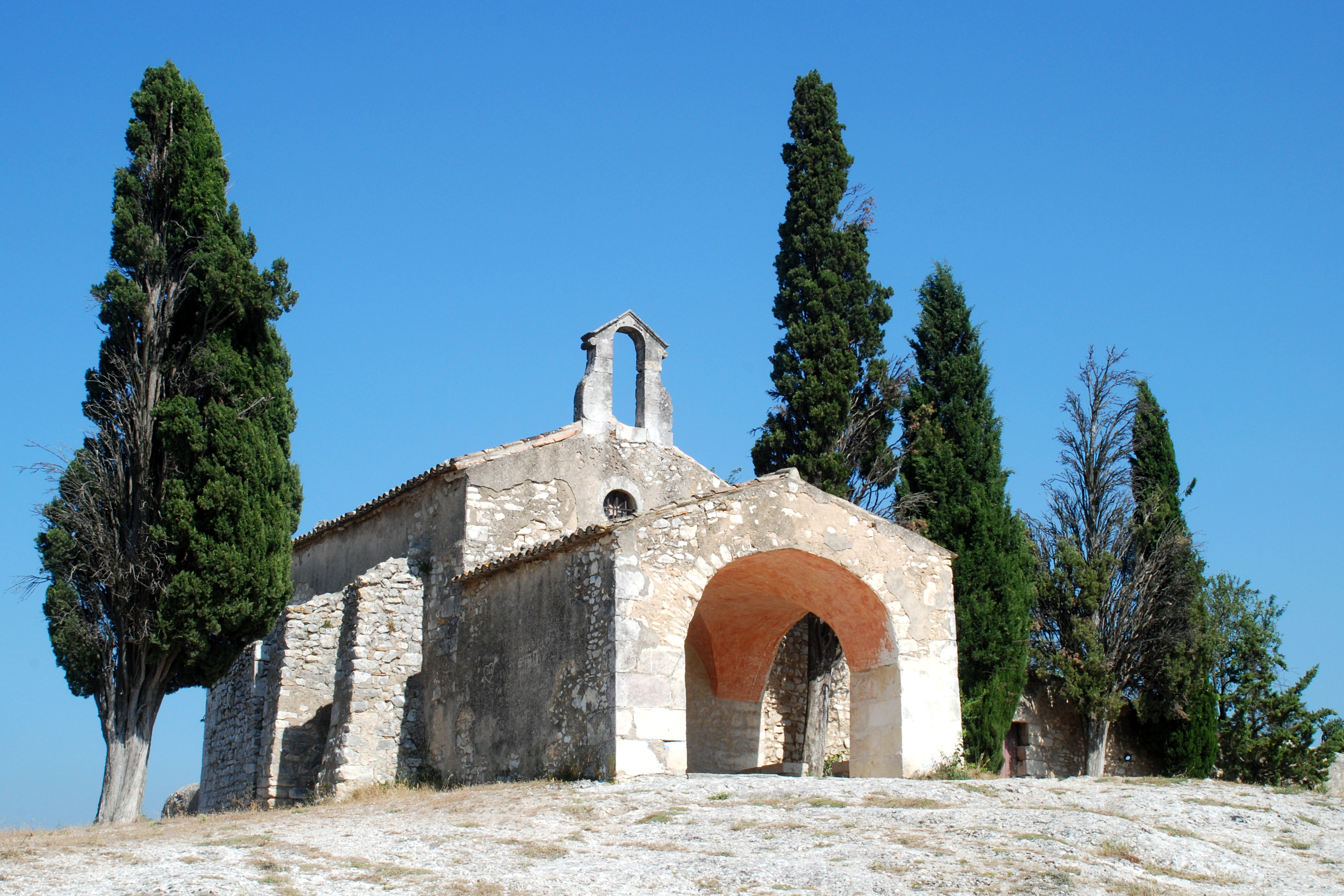
Chapelle Saint-Sixte d'Eygalières, Bouches-du-Rhône, Provence, France

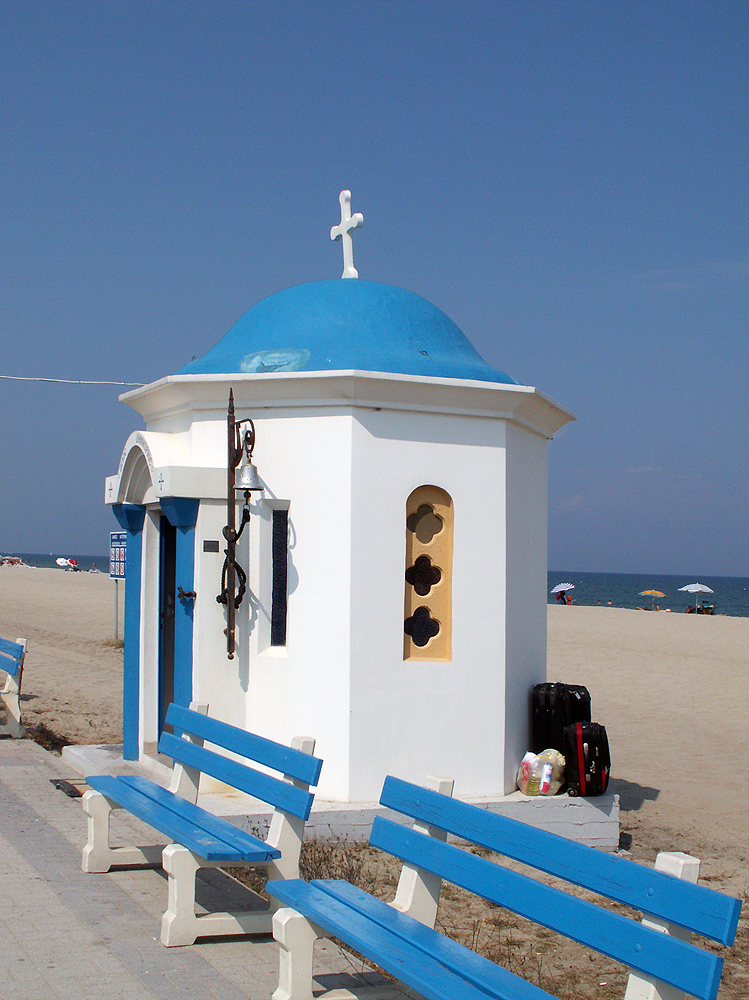
St. Dimitrius Chapel on the beach of Olympiaki Akti, Greece

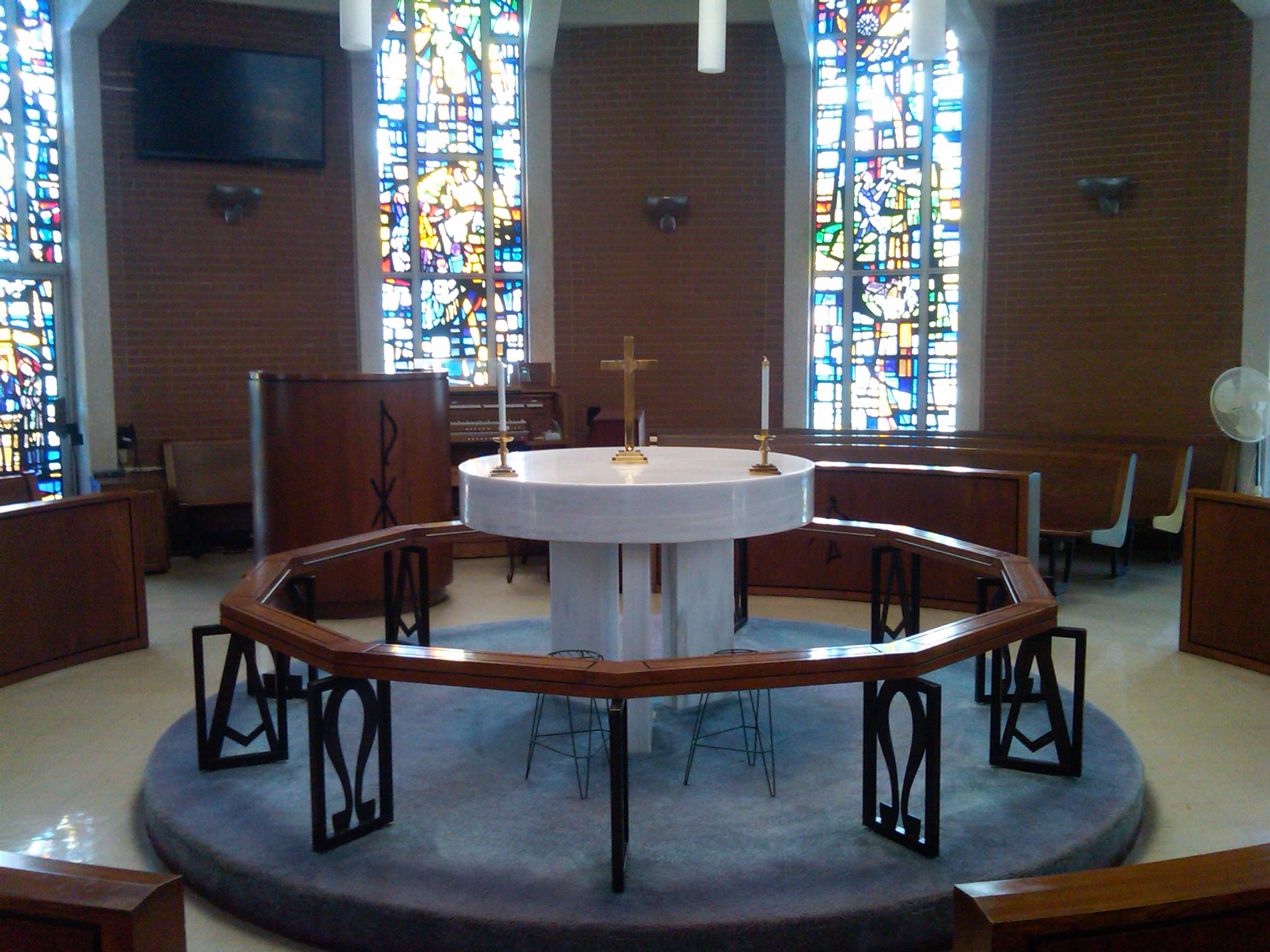
Methodist Chapel in Kent, Ohio, United States

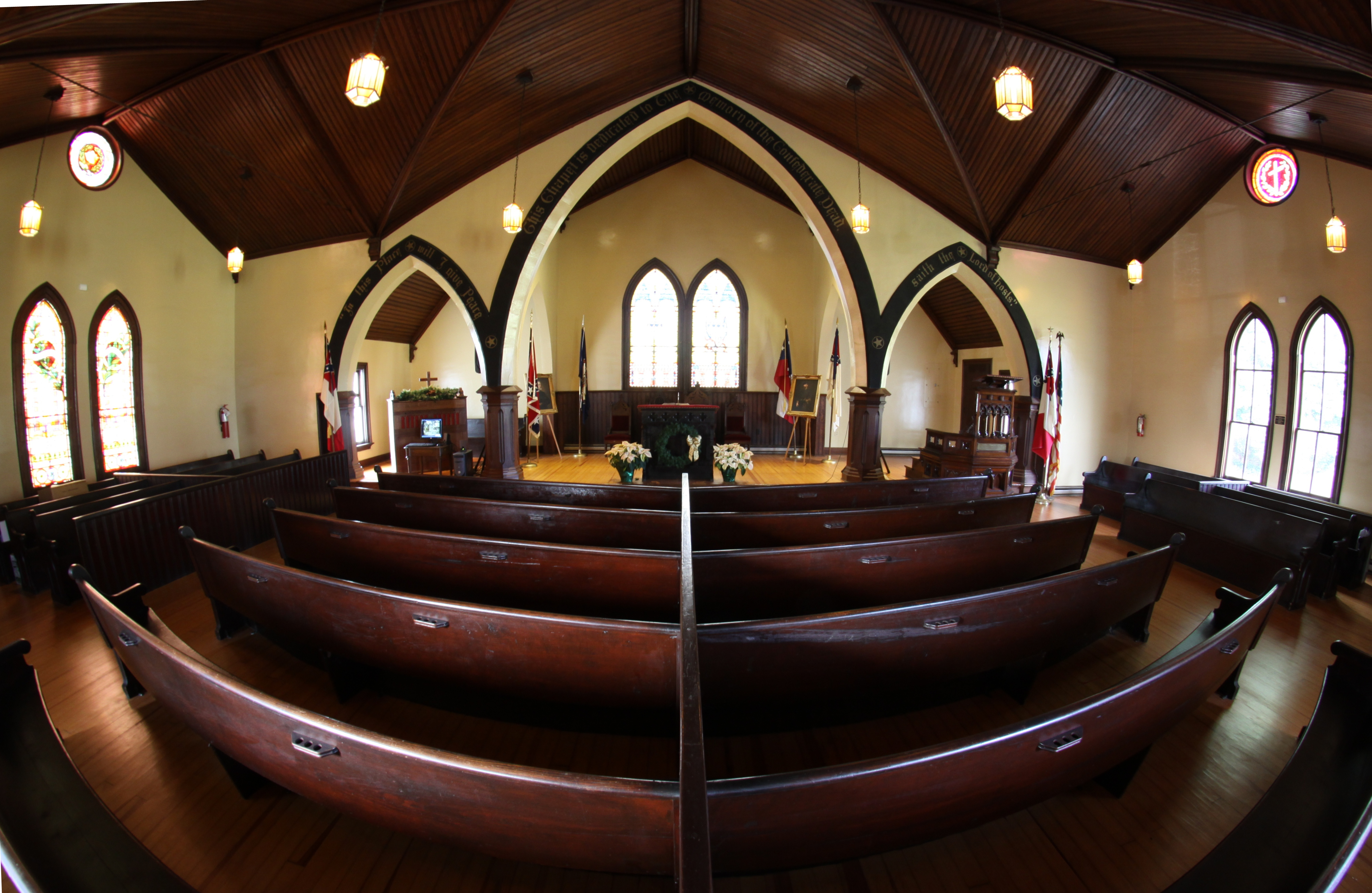
Confederate Memorial Chapel, Richmond, Virginia, United States

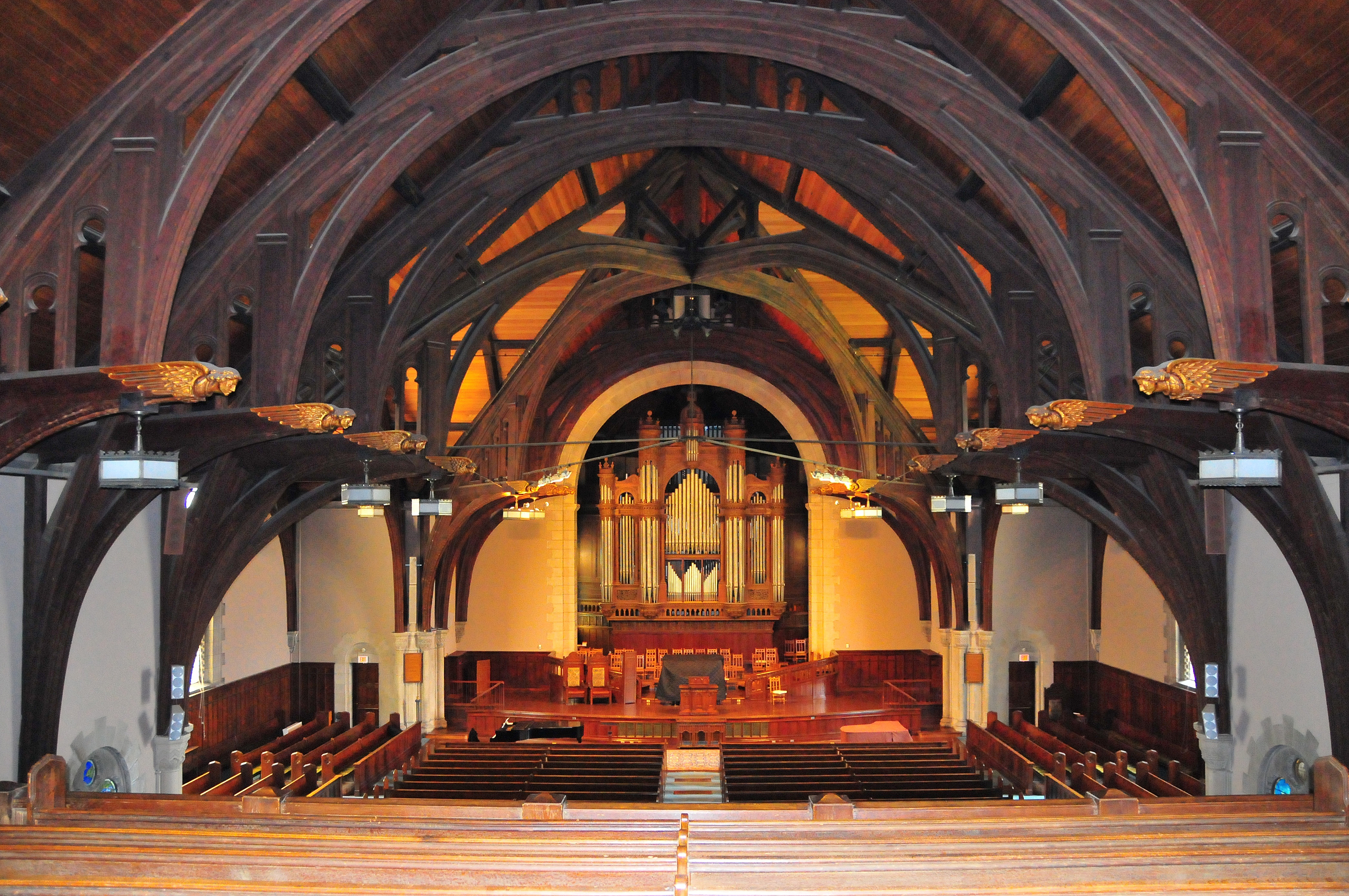
Vassar Chapel Interior, Vassar College, Poughkeepsie, New York

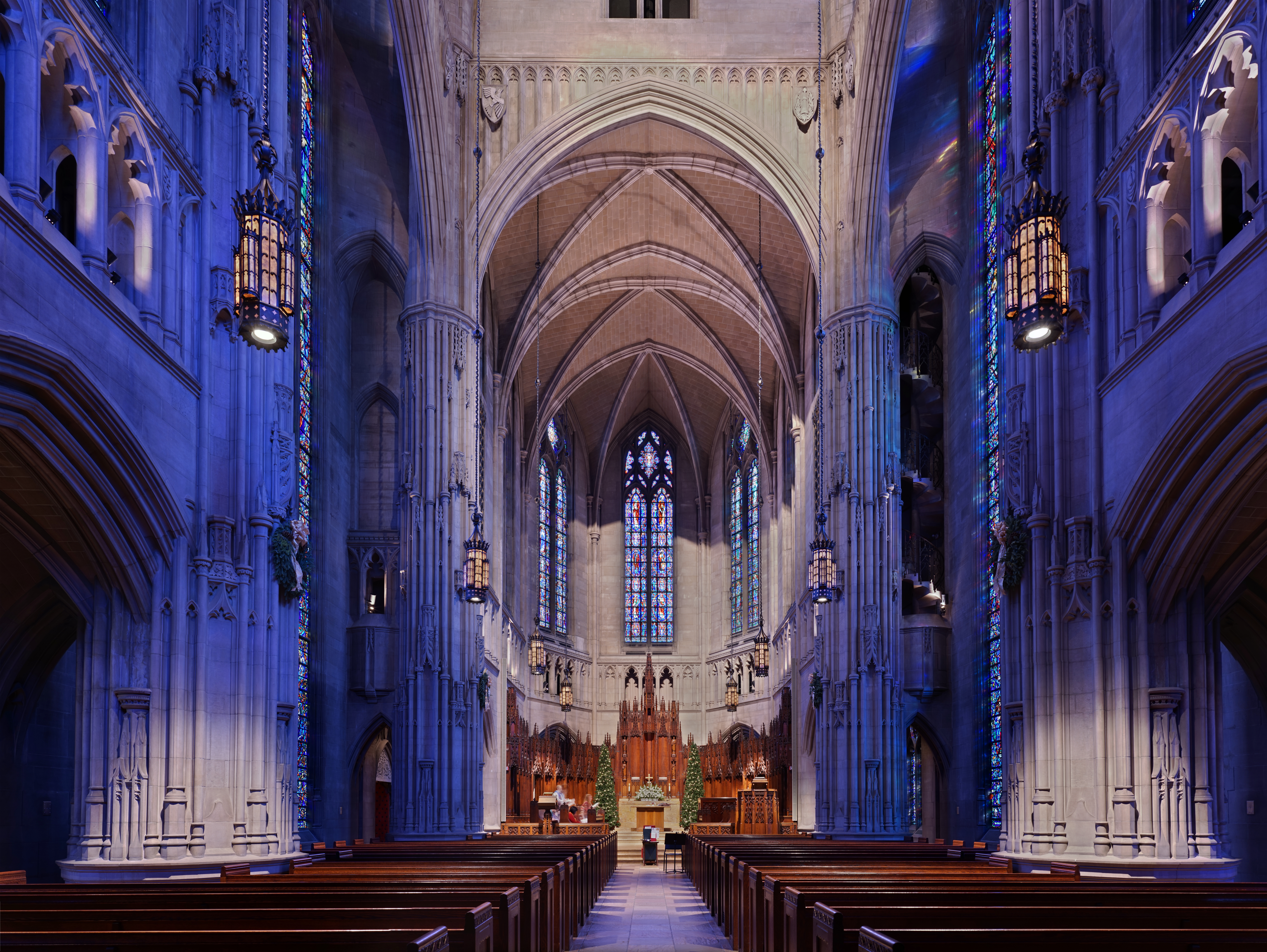
Interior of Heinz Chapel, University of Pittsburgh

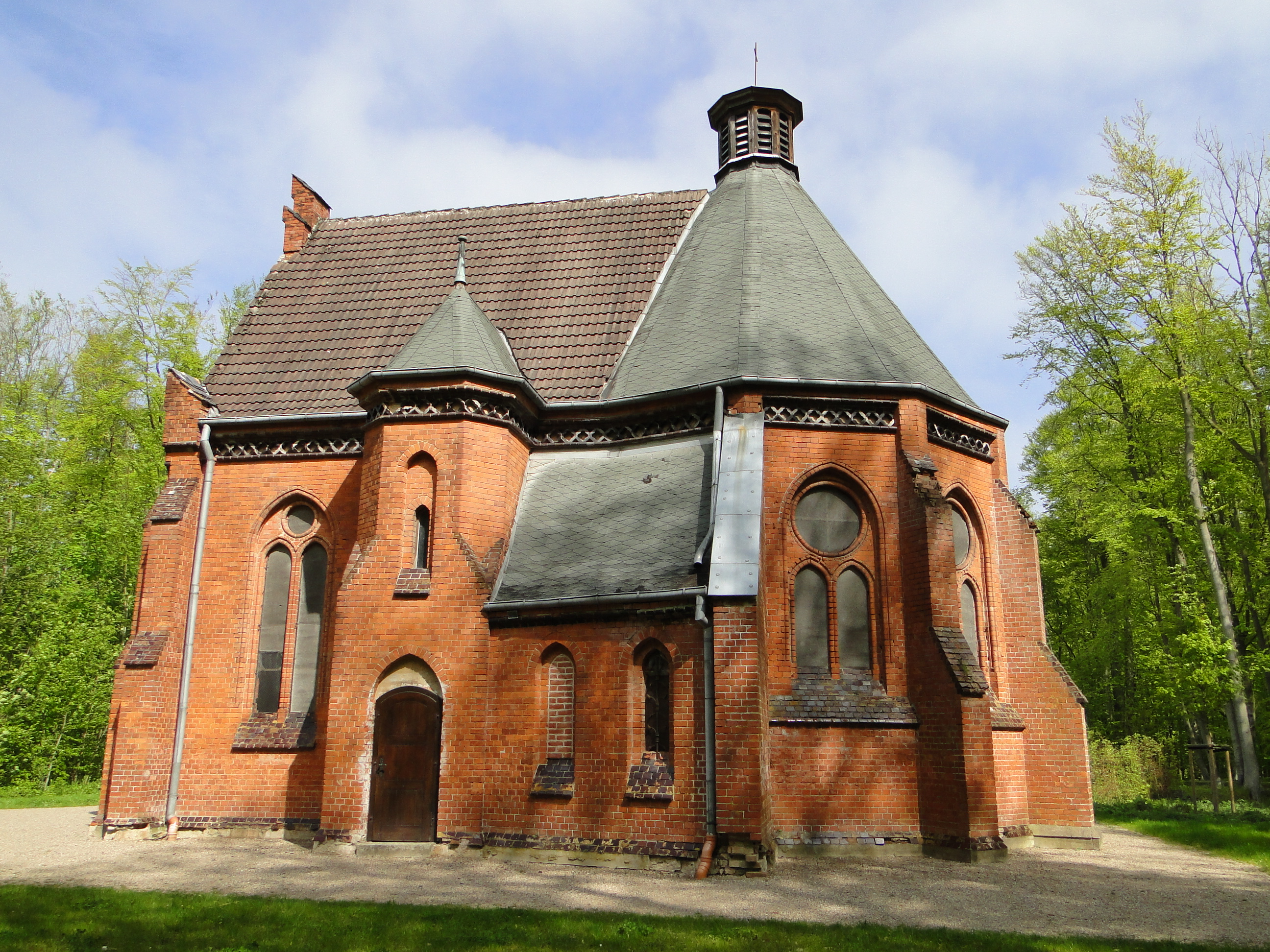
Forest chapel in Heiligendamm, Bad Doberan, Mecklenburg-Vorpommern, Germany

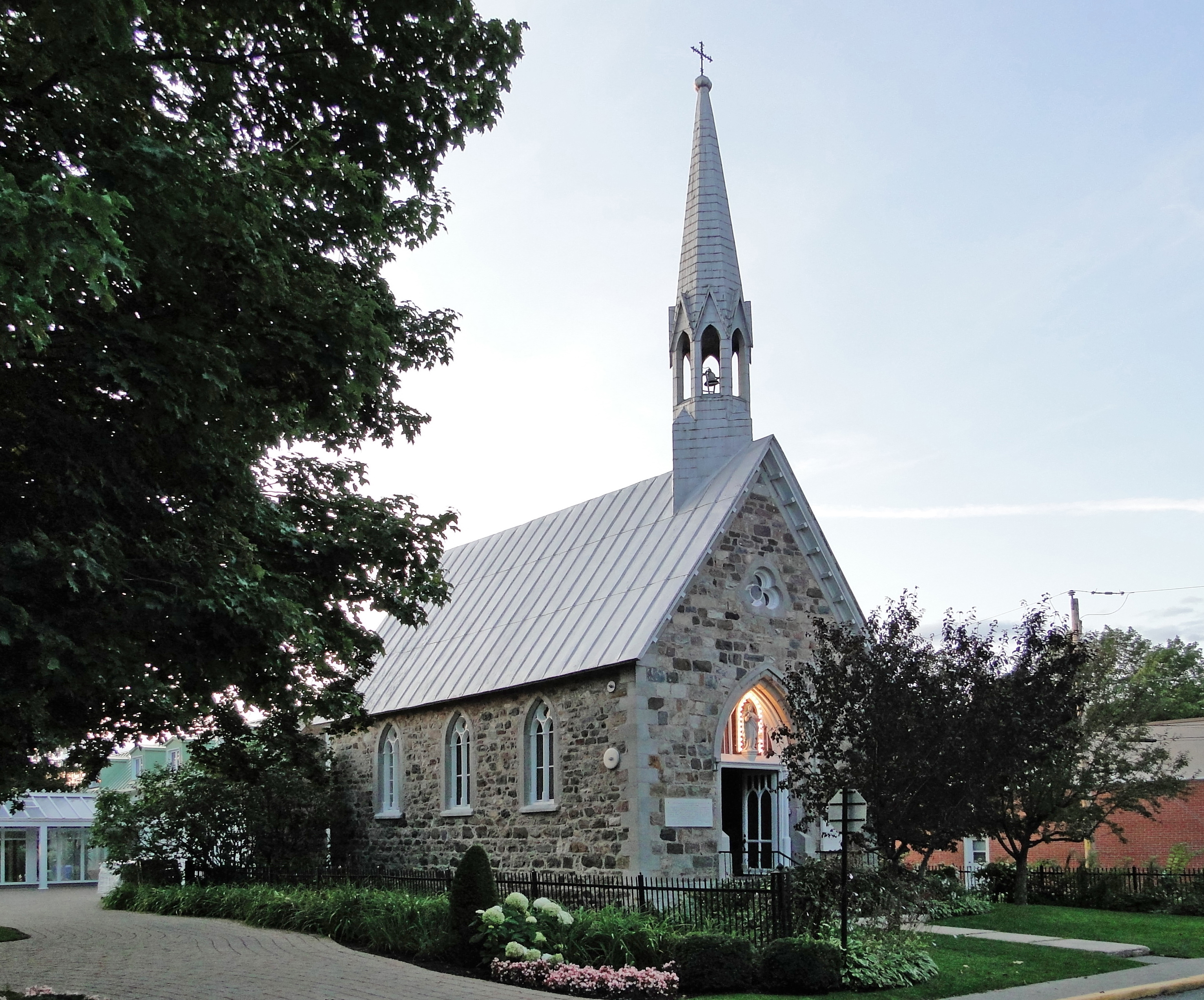
Processional Chapel in Varennes, Quebec

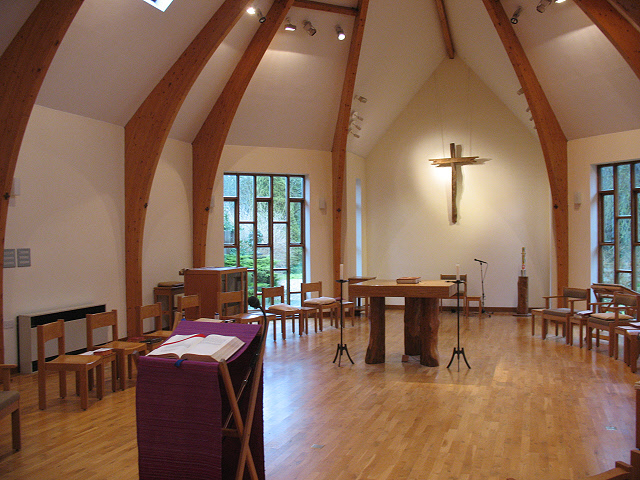
Turvey Abbey, chapel interior

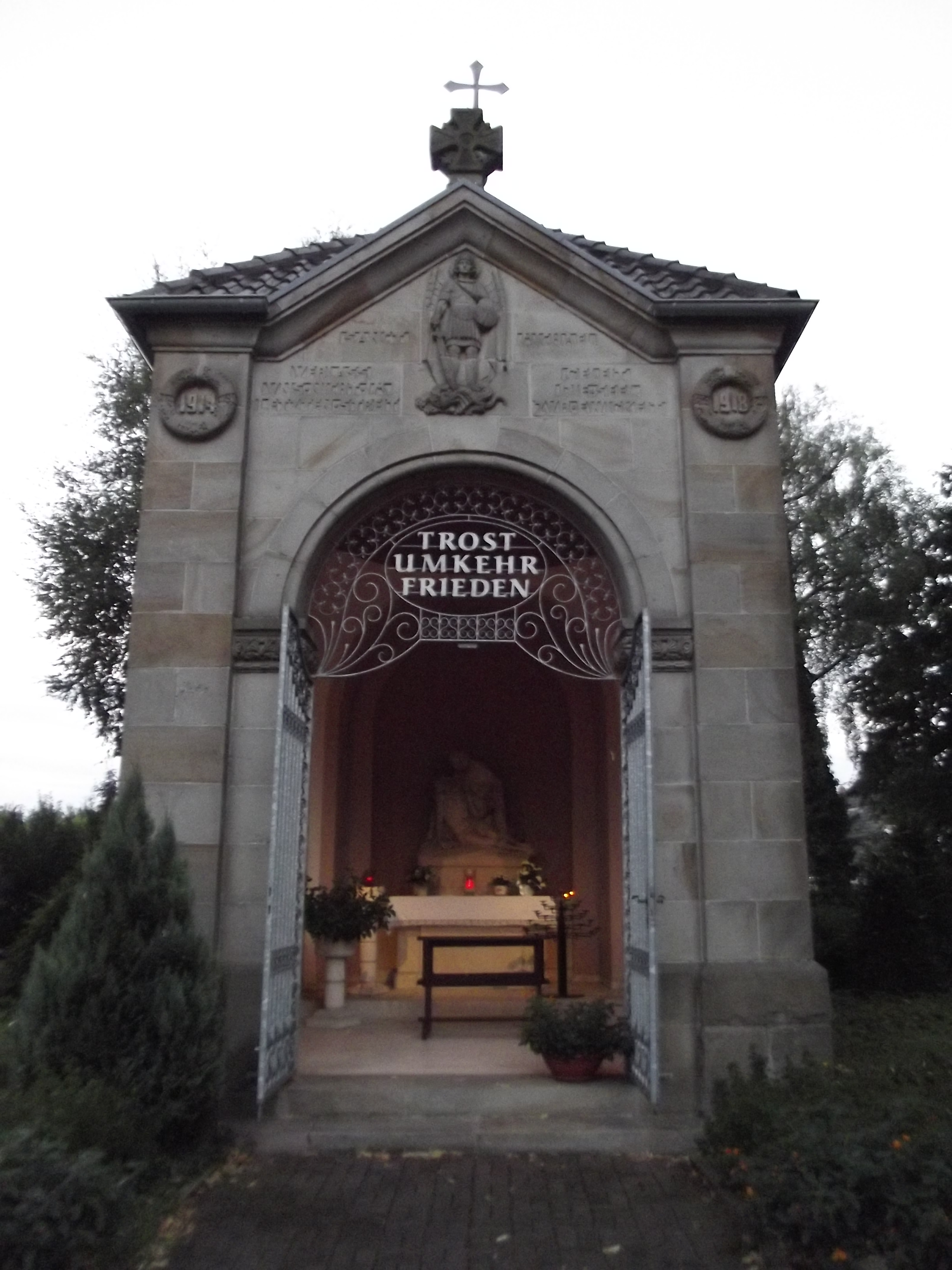
Open Chapel in Steinfurt, Germany

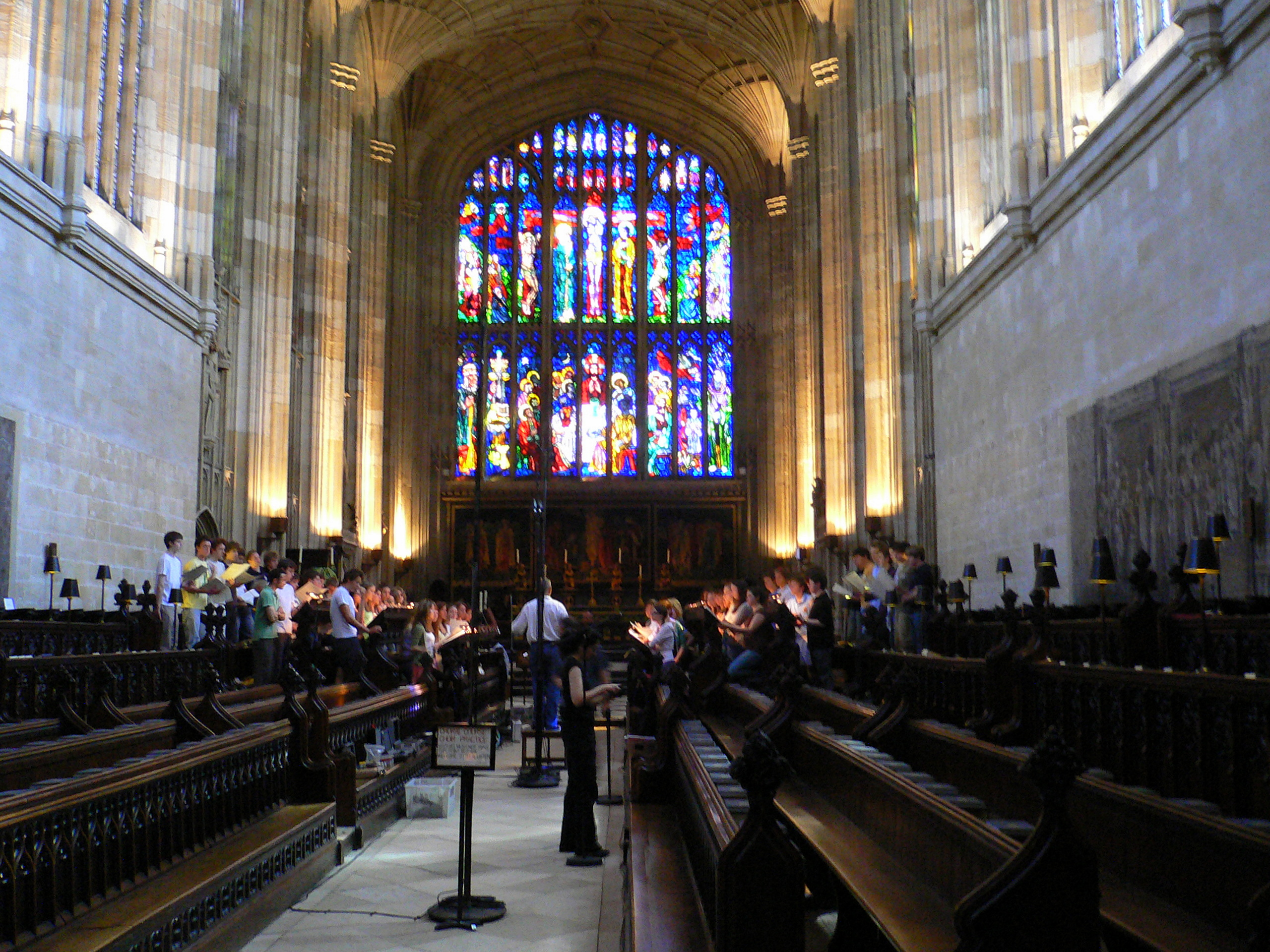
Eton College Chapel in Eton College, England

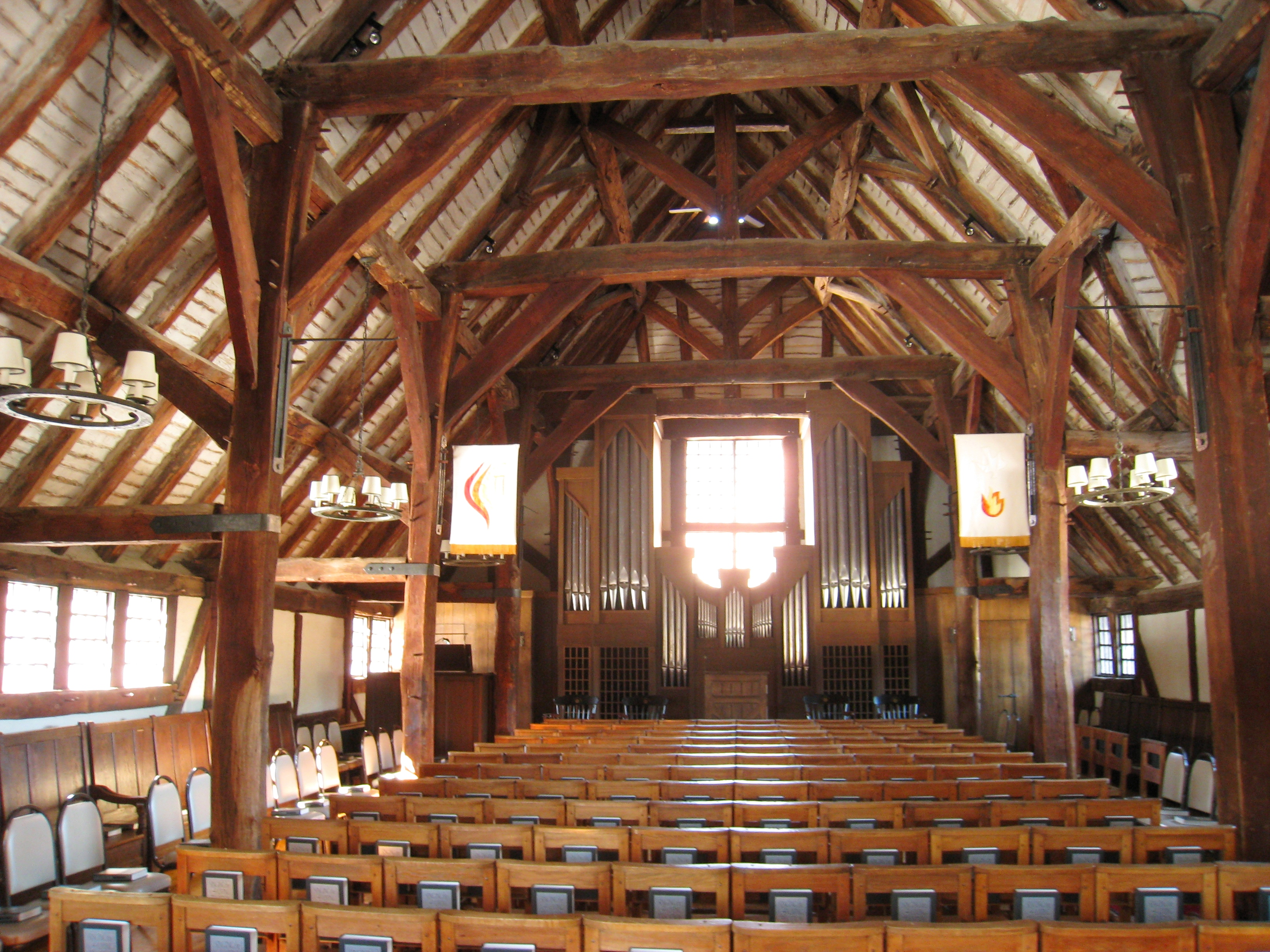
Avon Old Farms School - the chapel

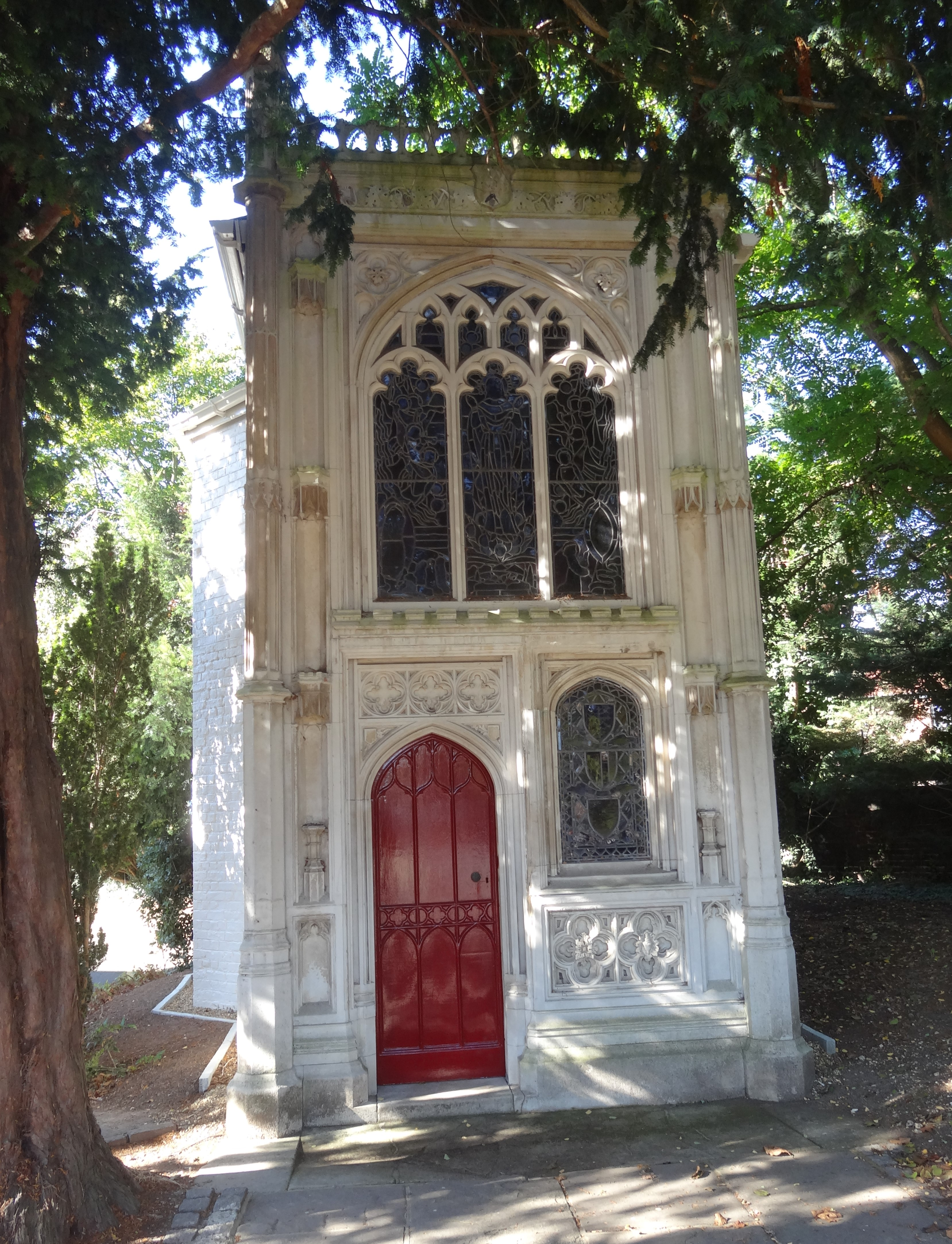
Chapel in the Wood, Strawberry Hill House, near London

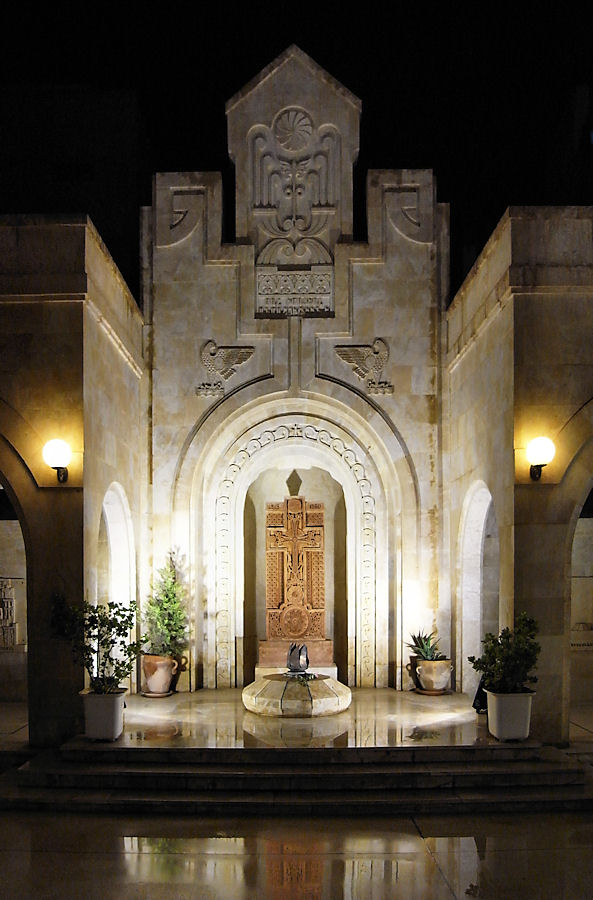
Chapel in the Armenian Cathedral Deir Ez Zor

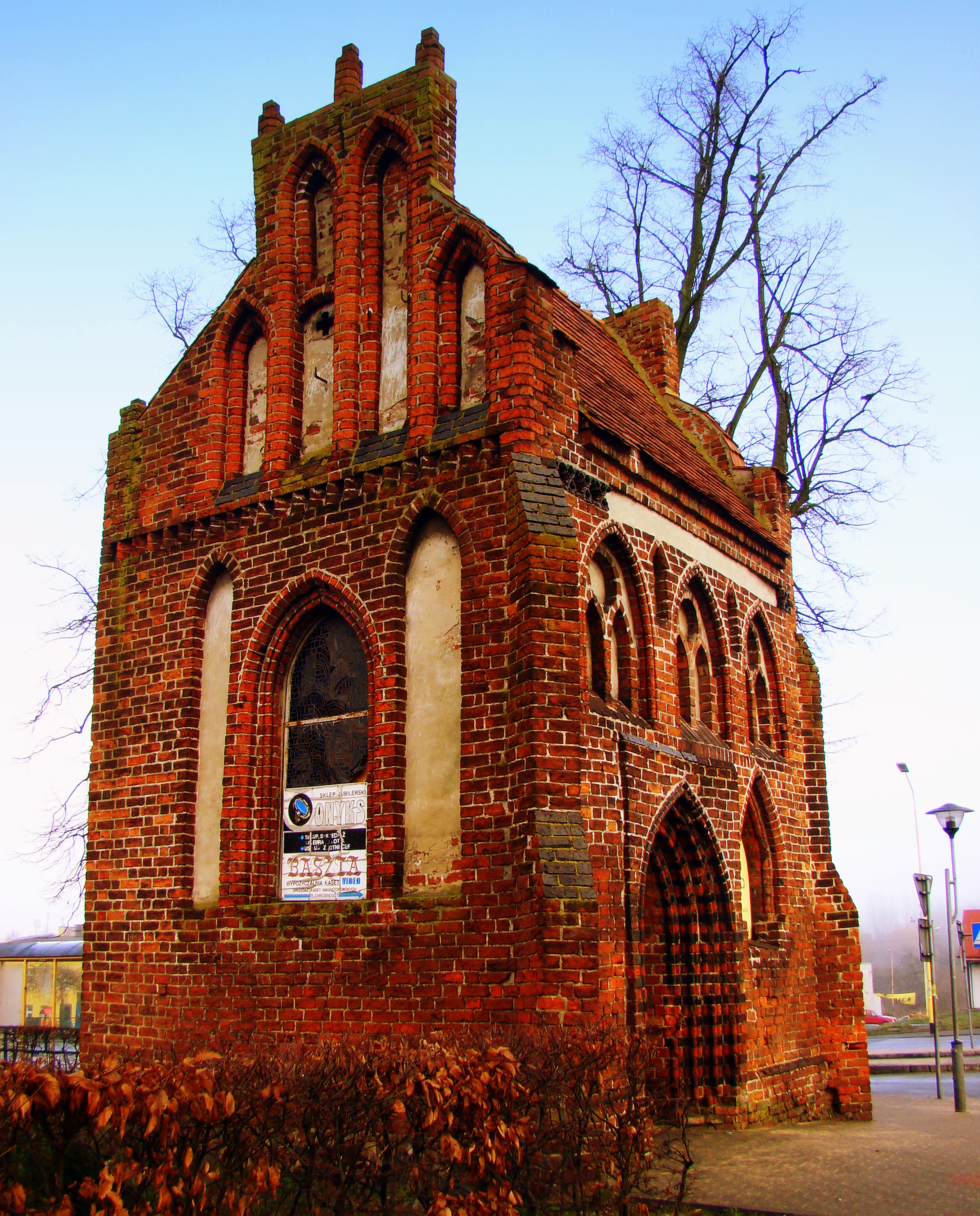
Gothic Chapel (15th century) in The Chrobry Square, Police, Poland

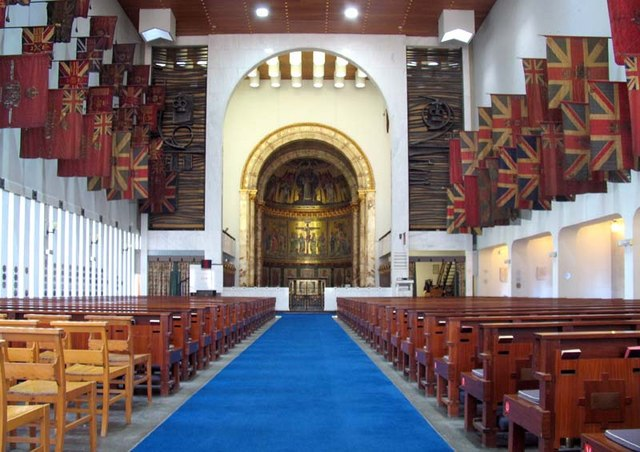
Guards Chapel, Wellington Barracks, London, largely rebuilt after bombing in 1944

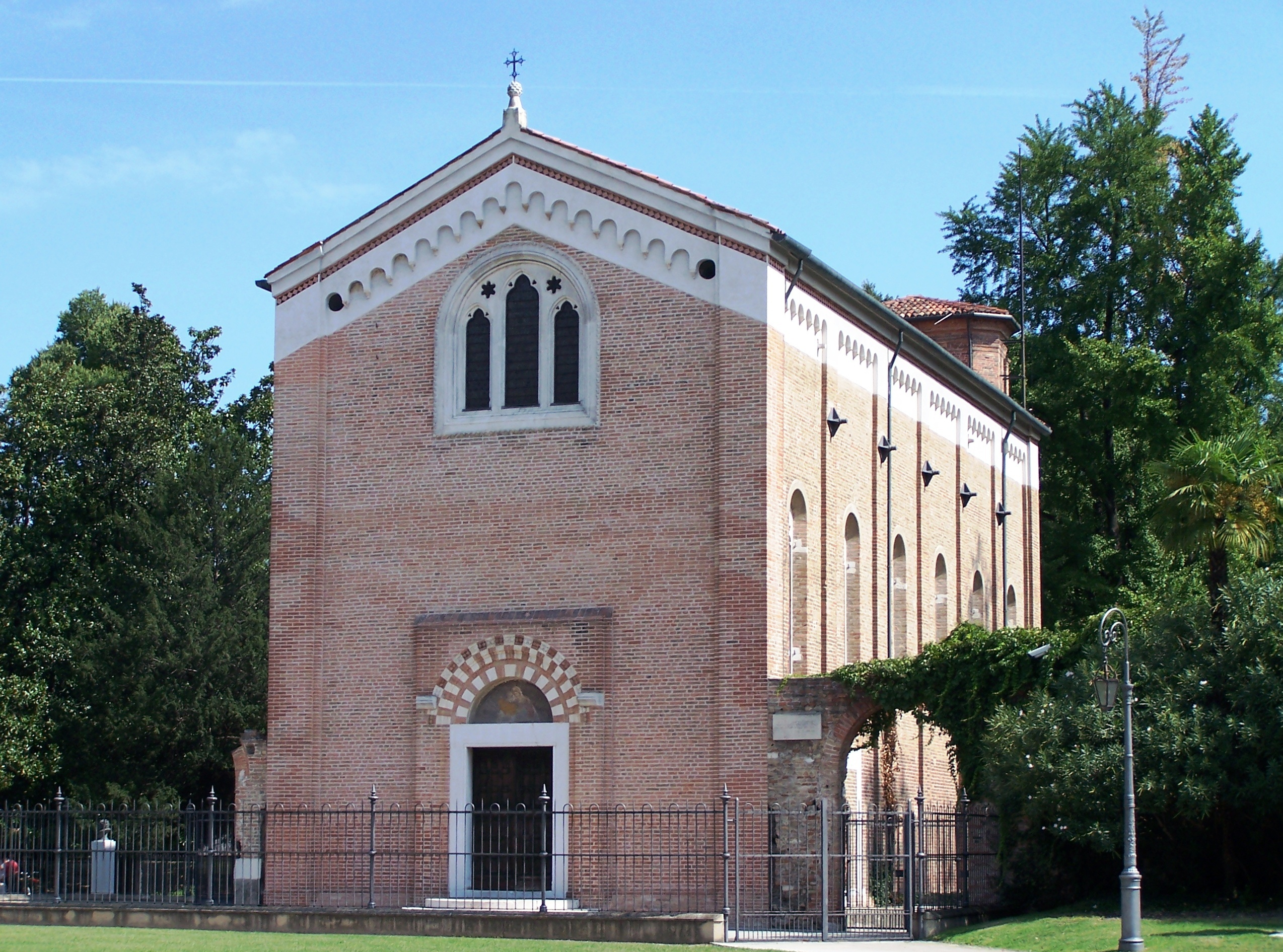
Cappella degli Scrovegni in Padua, Italy

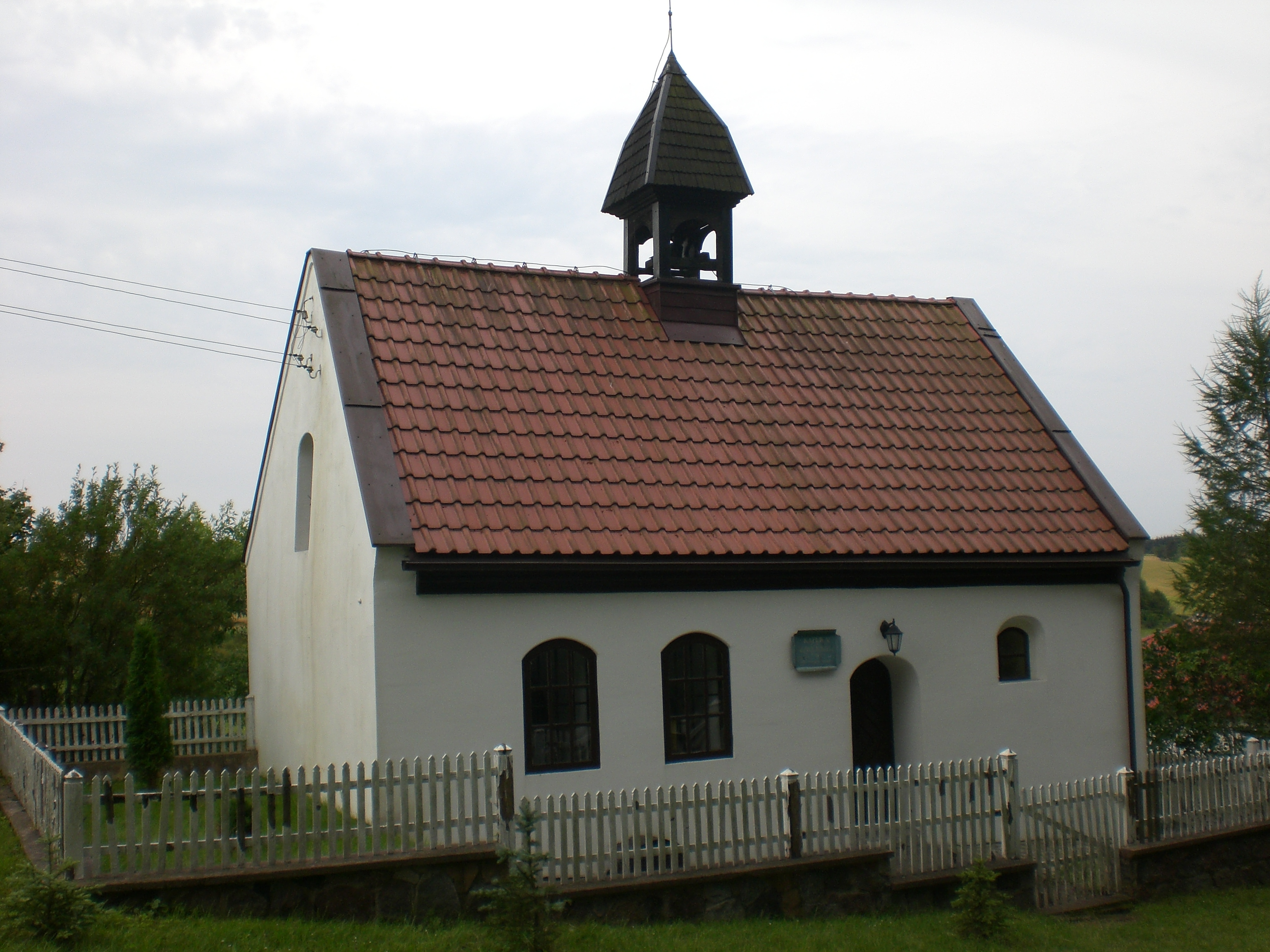
Chapel in Mirachowo, Kashubia (bd. 1740)

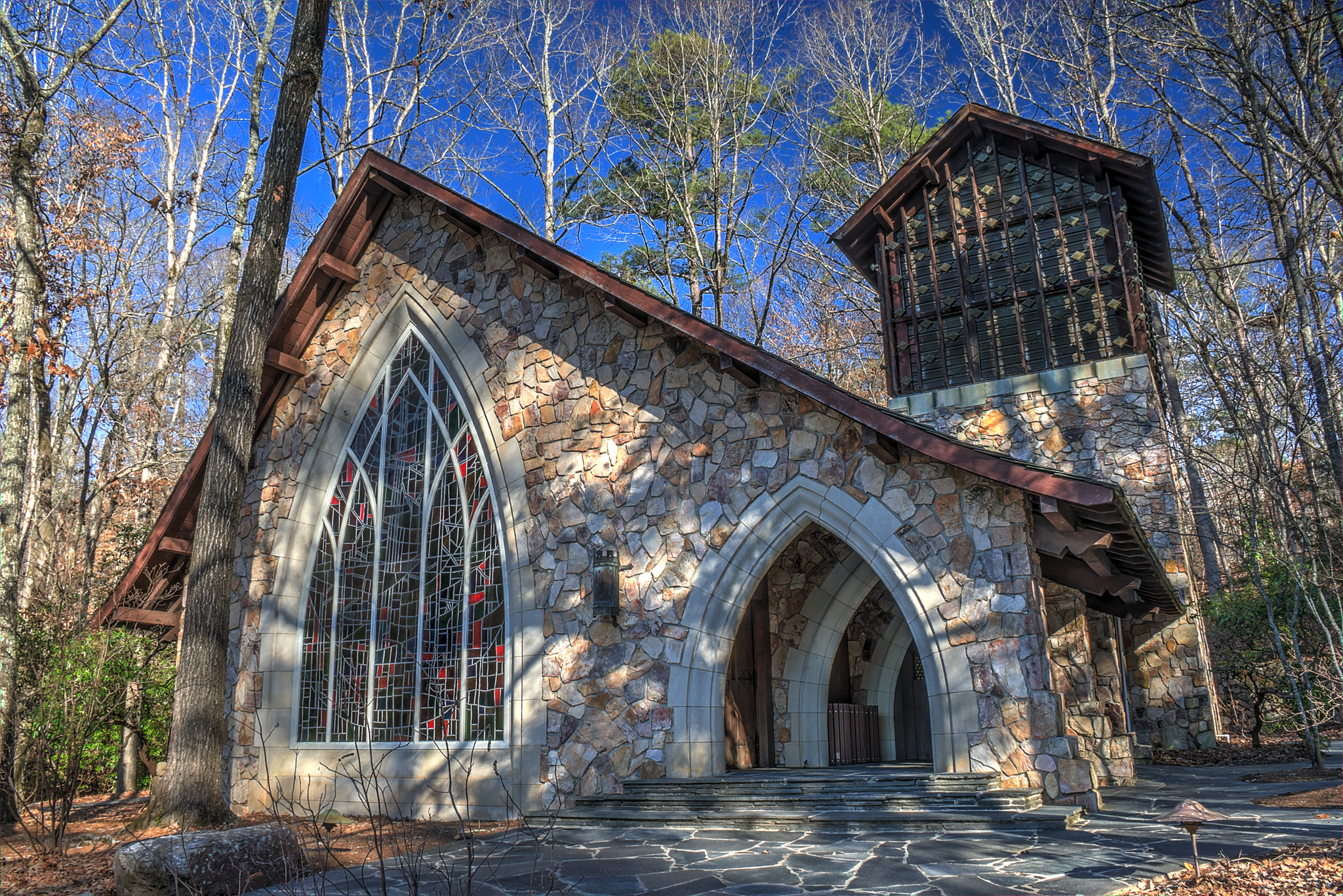
Chapel at Callaway Gardens in holiday resort

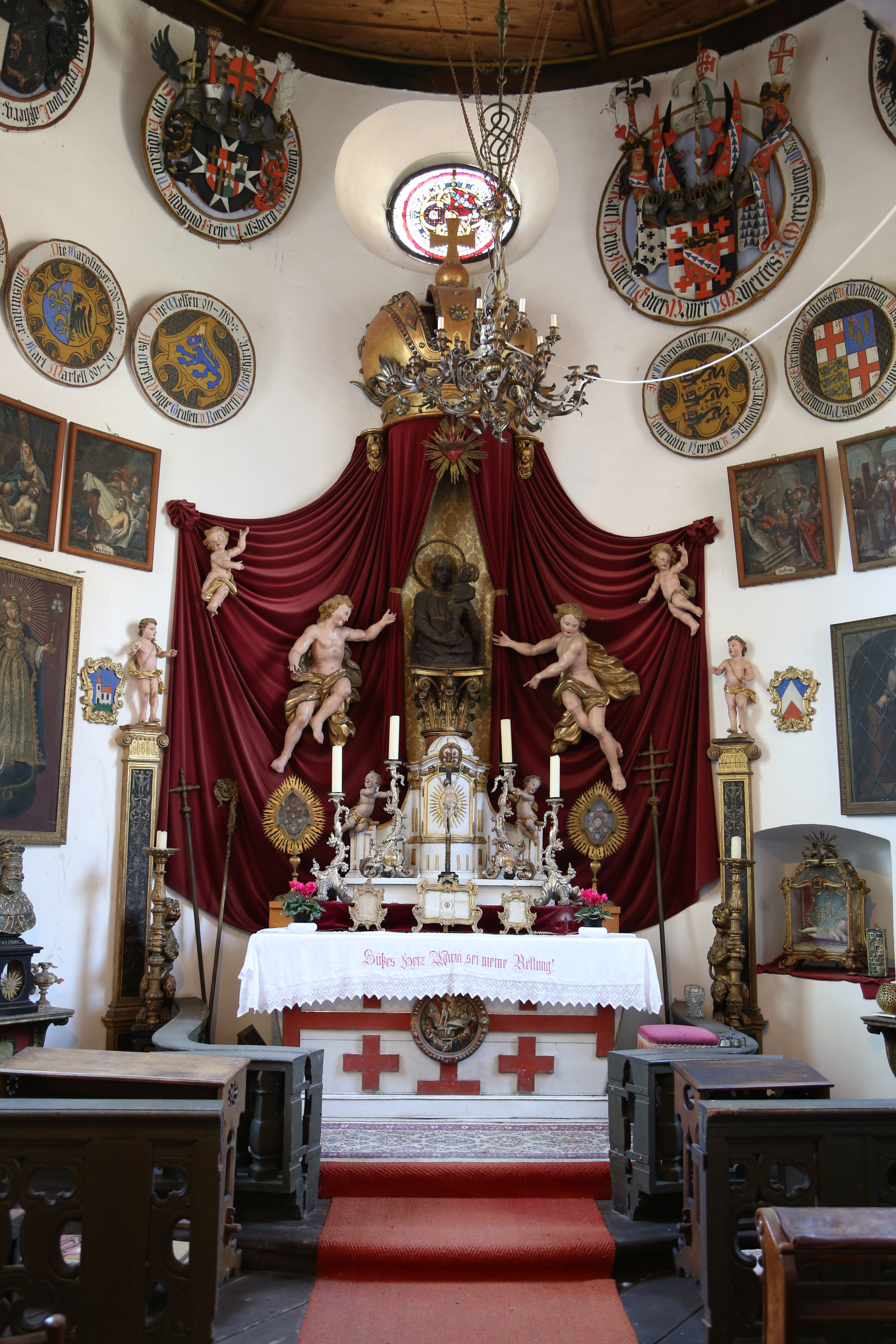
German castle chapel

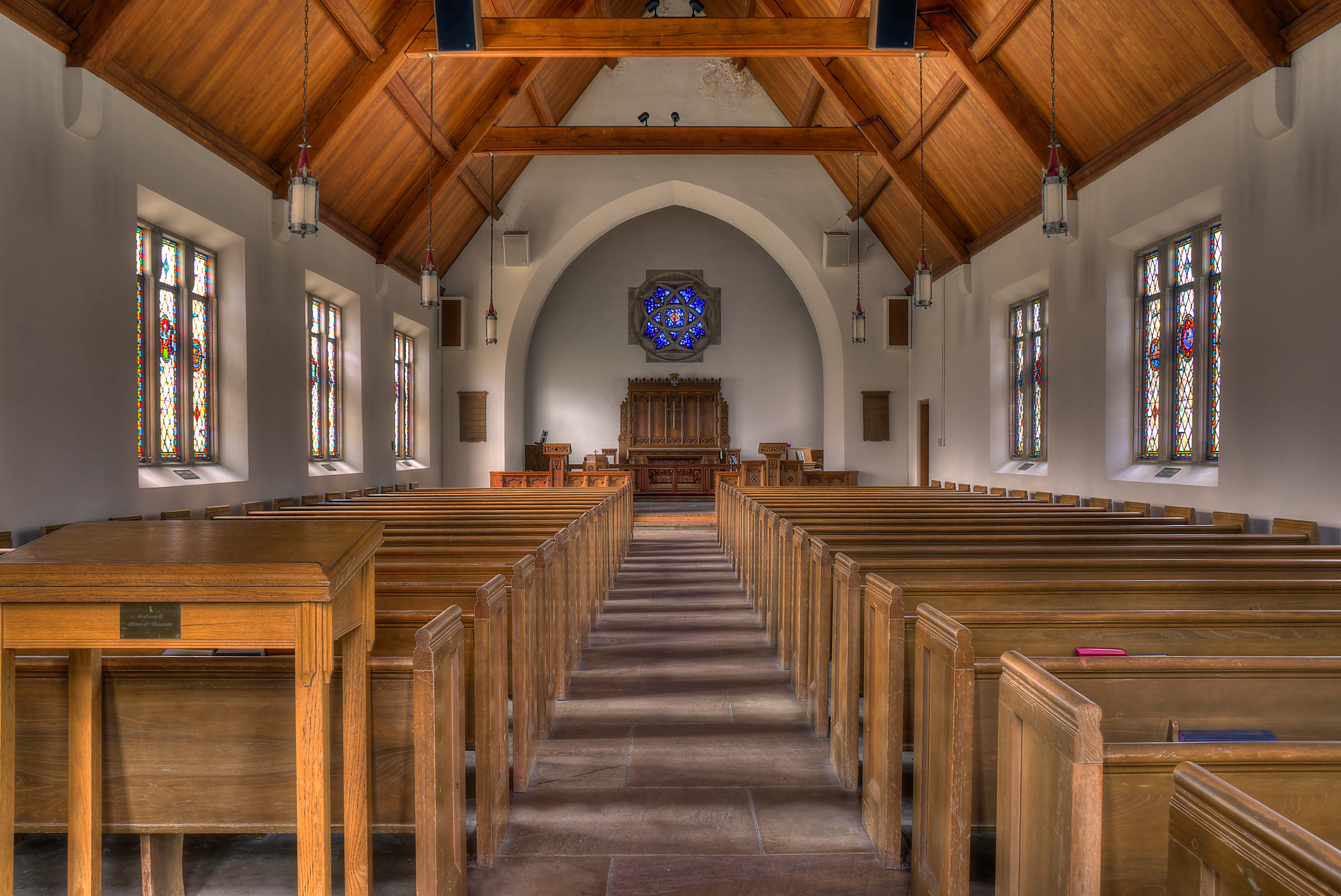
Memorial Chapel at Lake Junaluska

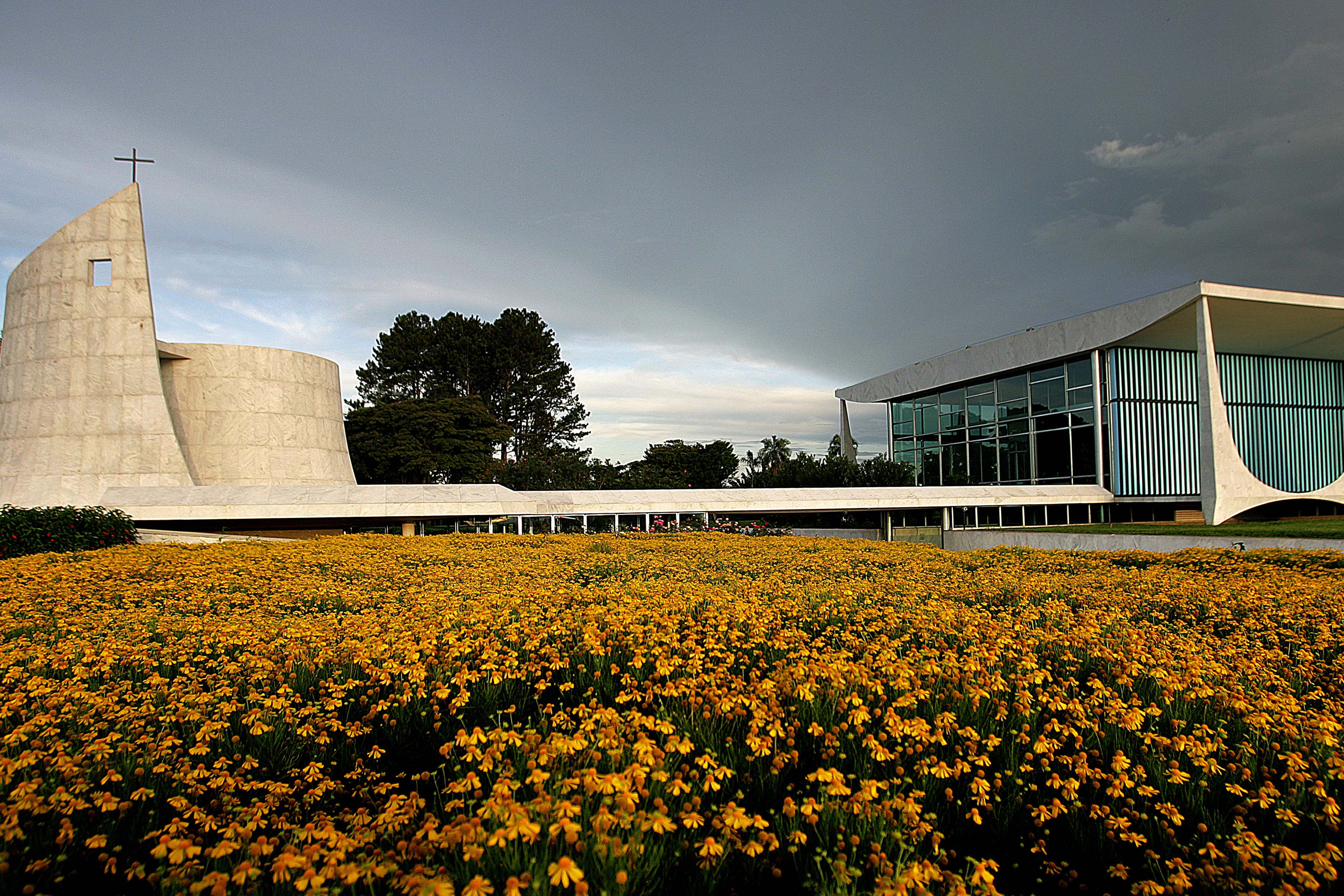
The modernist presidential chapel (left) at the Palácio da Alvorada, the official residence of the President of Brazil

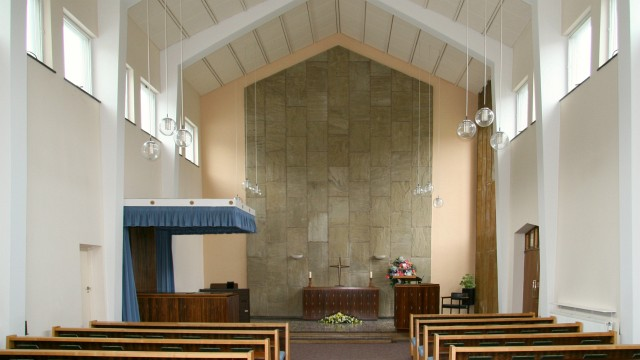
Funeral chapel at Woodlands Crematorium, Scarborough, England

== See also ==
- Chapel (music)
- Church (building)
- Father of the Chapel
- Sacri Monti
- Corpse road
- Railroad chapel car
- Chapelle de l'Oratoire, Nantes
