= Marcùs Chapel =

Catholic chapel in Barcelona, Spain

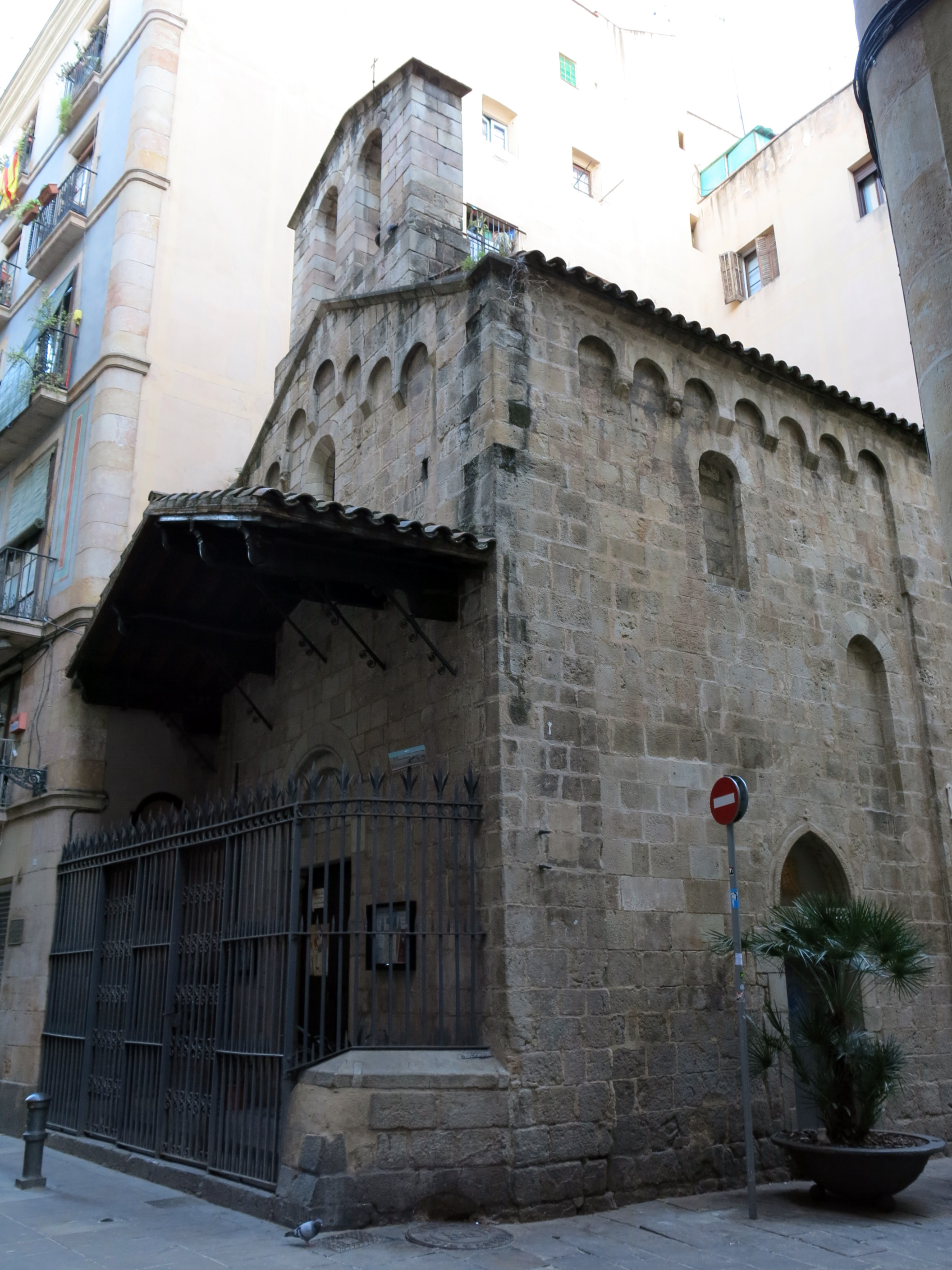
- Facade of the chapel
- Marcùs Chapel
- 41°23′09″N 2°10′48″E
- Location: Barcelona, Spain
- Country: Spain
- Denomination: Catholicism

Architecture
- Groundbreaking: 12th century

Administration
- Diocese: Roman Catholic Archdiocese of Barcelona

The Marcùs Chapel (Catalan: Capella d'en Marcús, Spanish: Capilla de Marcús) is a Catholic religious building, with the status of chapel, located in Barcelona (Spain), on the corner of Carrer dels Carders and Placeta d'en Marcús de Barcelona, listed as a Cultural asset of local interest.

The place of worship is dedicated to the Virgin Mary, but popular tradition has attributed the name of its financier, the powerful banker Bernat Marcús who also built a hospital and a cemetery nearby.

== See also ==
=== Related articles ===
- Romanesque art

=== External links ===
- Guia temàtica Biblioteca ETSAB: La capella d'en Marcús
