= Holy Cross Catholic Church (Durham, North Carolina) =

Catholic church in Durham, North Carolina

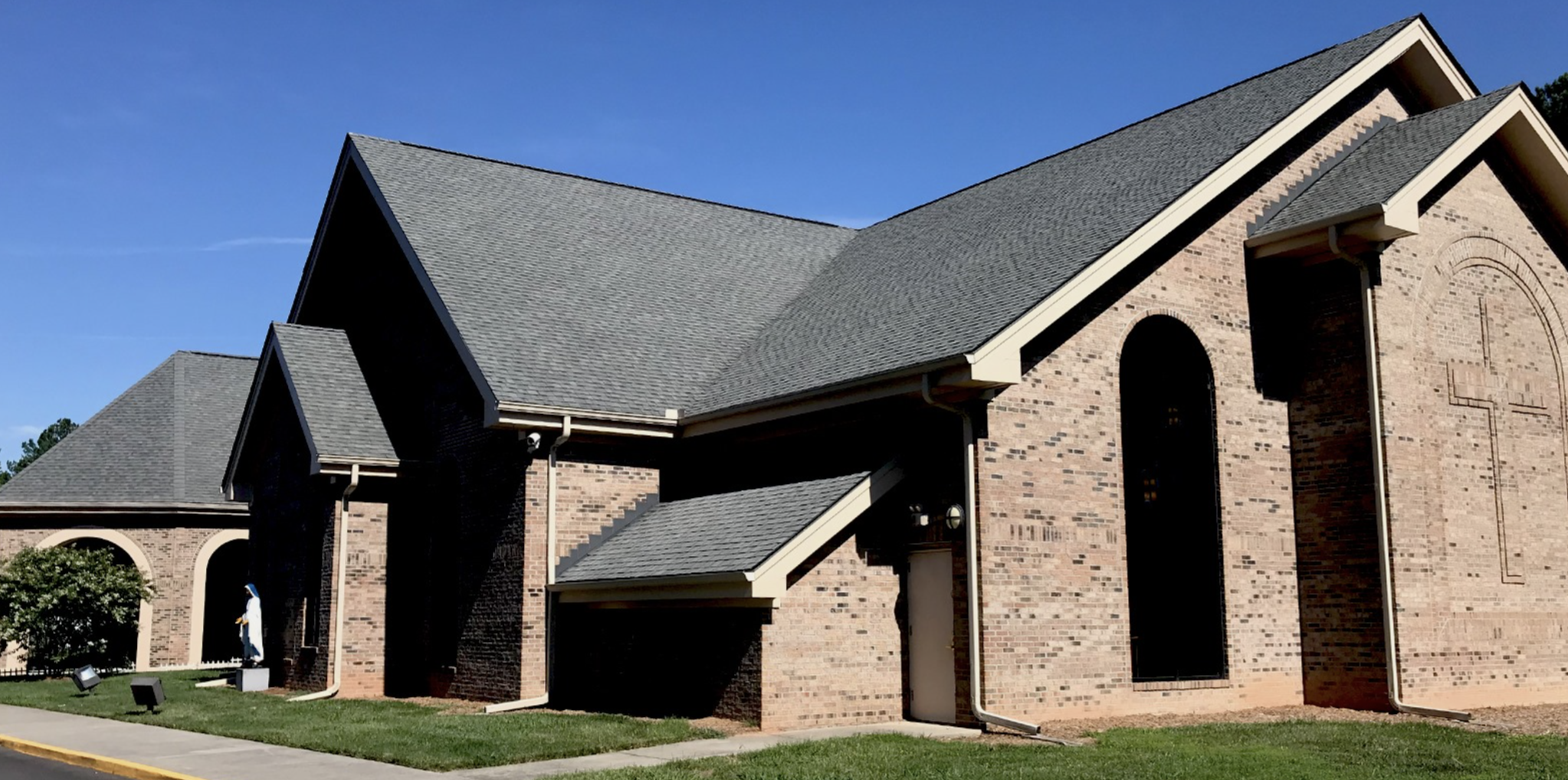
- Holy Cross Church in 2021

Religion
- Affiliation: Catholic Church
- Diocese: Diocese of Raleigh
- Leadership: Bishop Luis R. Zarama
- Status: Active

Location
- Location: 2438 S Alston Avenue; Durham, North Carolina, United States
- Interactive map of Holy Cross Catholic Church
- Coordinates: 35°57′14″N 78°53′01″W

Website
- holycrossdurham.org

Holy Cross Catholic Church is a historically African-American Catholic church in Durham, North Carolina.

== History ==
Holy Cross Catholic Church was founded in 1939 by the Maryland Province of the Society of Jesus as one of North Carolina's first African-American Catholic congregations. The congregation had a rectory constructed in 1942, using one room as a chapel. A sanctuary was built in 1953 at 1400 South Alston Avenue.

In 1996, a walk-out was organized by Latino parishioners at the church, who criticized resistance to the arrival of Latino immigrants in the community.

In 2006, the congregation sold their land to North Carolina Central University, which was developing around the church, and moved the church to the corner of Fayetteville Street and Pekoe Avenue. The NCCU School of Nursing was built on the church's original site. The congregation later left their original building, which is now owned by the university and was renamed Centennial Chapel in 2010, and purchased a new lot on South Alston Avenue. Since 2014, the church has been run by the Franciscan Friars Conventual from Our Lady of the Angels Province in Maryland.

In July 2021, Fr. Pius Wekesa was appointed as pastor of the church, becoming the first African Catholic priest, and the first diocesan priest, to serve the congregation.
