= St. Thomas More Academy =

Private, Conservative, College-Preparatory school in North Carolina

Location
- 3109 Spring Forest Road; Raleigh, North Carolina, Wake County 27616; United States; 35°51′21″N 78°35′18″W

Information
- Type: Private, Conservative, College Preparatory
- Motto: Ad Majorem Dei Gloriam (For the Greater Glory of God)
- Religious affiliation: Roman Catholic
- Founded: 2002 (24 years ago)
- Founder: Robert L. Luddy
- CEEB code: 343204
- Chairman: Robert L. Luddy
- Headmaster: Deacon Brad Watkins
- Staff: 4
- Faculty: 15
- Grades: 6–12
- Enrollment: Over 200 (2020)
- Athletics conference: North Carolina Independent Schools Athletic Association (NCISAA)
- Mascot: Chancellor
- Rivals: The Epiphany School
- Tuition: $6,500
- Website: www.stmacademy.org

St. Thomas More Academy (STMA) is a private, co-educational, college preparatory school operated by Catholic laity. It is operated independently of the Roman Catholic Diocese of Raleigh. It serves students and their families in the Raleigh, North Carolina area. Formerly a 9–12 school, starting in the 2020–2021 school year, they added a middle school program to serve grade 6–8.

== History ==
The school was founded in 2002 by Robert L. Luddy to meet the growing needs of Raleigh Catholics. Some families approached Bishop Francis Joseph Gossman about starting and gaining approval for this independent school to operate. The first classes were held at St. Luke the Evangelist Catholic Church in Raleigh. The school relocated to a larger facility at Paragon Park Road in Raleigh in 2004. In 2006, the school relocated to a larger space on Spring Forest Road. Since that time the school has grown and opened a new three-acre campus in August 2007. In 2012, the campus was further expanded to include a second building. The campus houses classrooms, faculty offices, laboratories, two small theaters, a library, and a chapel.

== Student life ==
Service and outreach work is a requirement for all students at St. Thomas More Academy. Freshmen serve the young at St. Joseph Preschool, Sophomores feed the hungry at the Raleigh Rescue Mission and at Catholic Parish Outreach, Juniors care for the elderly at Raleigh Heritage Senior Living Center, and Seniors work at Habitat for Humanity construction sites to build shelters for the homeless. Every year, a group of students from St. Thomas More Academy joins the Bishop of Raleigh and other members of the Diocese in Washington, D.C. at the March for Life.

St. Thomas More Academy offers a variety of clubs, special events, and sports. More than seventy-five percent of the student body is engaged in extracurricular activities, with most programs being started through the initiative of students.

== Athletics ==
St. Thomas More is a member of the Carolina Independent Conference. Sports offered at STMA include soccer, basketball, cross country, swimming, volleyball, ultimate frisbee, track & field, and baseball.

== See also ==
- Cardinal Gibbons High School
- National Catholic Educational Association
