= Sacred Heart Church (Raleigh, North Carolina) =

Historic church in North Carolina, United States

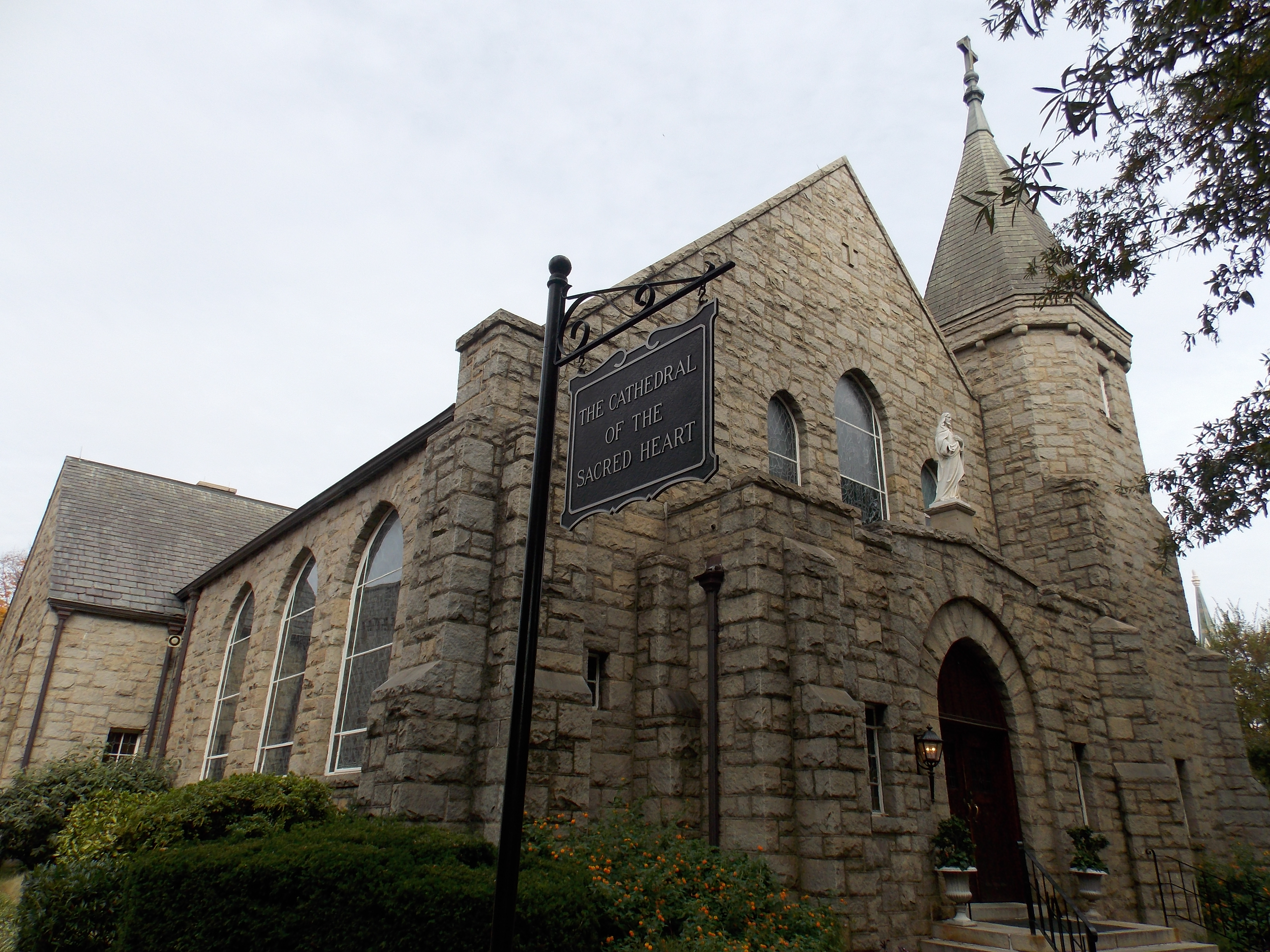
- Sacred Heart Church, Raleigh

- Location in North Carolina
- 35°46′51″N 78°38′31″W
- Location: 200 Hillsborough St. Raleigh, North Carolina
- Country: United States
- Denomination: Roman Catholic Church
- Website: http://www.sacredheartcathedral.org/ (Site address currently being used for both Sacred Heart Church and the Holy Name of Jesus Cathedral)

History
- Former name: Sacred Heart Cathedral
- Founded: 1879
- Dedicated: October 1924

Architecture
- Style: Neo-Gothic
- Groundbreaking: 1922
- Completed: 1924

Specifications
- Capacity: 320
- Materials: Stone

Administration
- Diocese: Raleigh

Clergy
- Bishop: Luis Rafael Zarama
- Rector: David D. Brockman
- Cathedral of the Sacred Heart
- U.S. Historic district – Contributing property
- Part of: Capitol Area Historic District (ID78001978)
- Added to NRHP: April 15, 1978

Sacred Heart Church is a Catholic church located on Hillsborough Street in downtown Raleigh, North Carolina, United States. The church served as the cathedral of the Diocese of Raleigh from 1924 to 2017. In 1978 it, and the other parish buildings, was included as a contributing property in the Capitol Area Historic District, which is listed on the National Register of Historic Places. Sacred Heart is also the location of the Cathedral School, formally called Sacred Heart Cathedral School.

== History ==
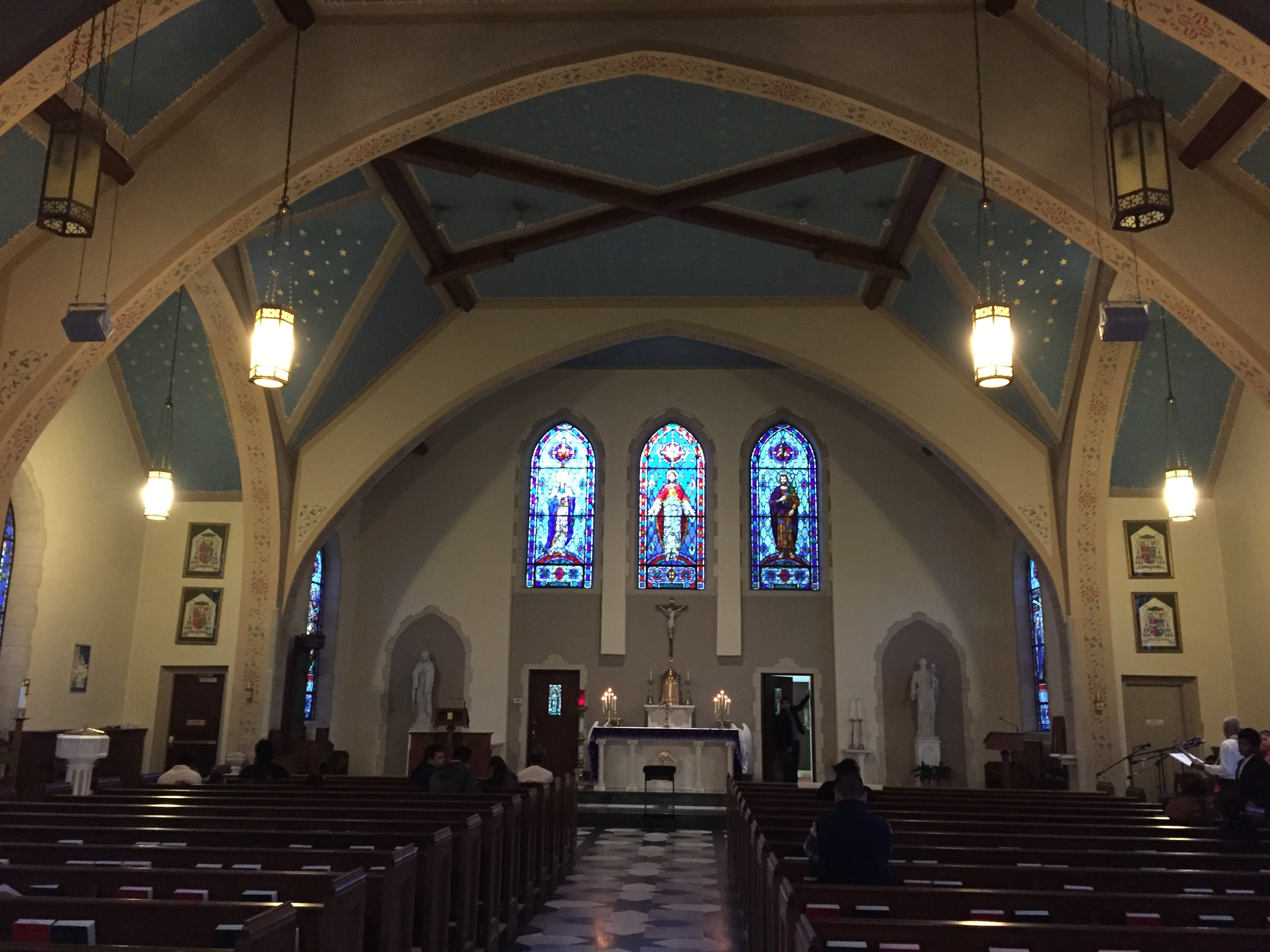
Interior of the church in 2017

Sacred Heart Parish was established in 1879. Ground was broken for the present church building in 1922, and it was completed two years later. Later in 1924 the Apostolic Vicariate of North Carolina was elevated to the Diocese of Raleigh, and Sacred Heart Church became the diocesan cathedral. North Carolina was the last state to have a diocese established within it, and Catholics were small in number.

The rectory, which sits behind the church, was completed in 1917, the convent that housed Dominican sisters was completed in 1927, and the school building was completed in 1938. While the buildings in the complex differ in style, they each feature irregular rough hewn ashlar stone with raised mortar joints. The church building itself is rather simple in its design. It features Gothic elements, such as pointed arches, lancet windows, mock buttresses, and a corner tower with a spire. There is a statue of the Sacred Heart of Jesus above the main entrance.

With seating for about 300 people, Sacred Heart had become the smallest Roman Catholic cathedral in the continental United States and the second smallest in the country. Due to the church's size, eleven Masses were necessary per weekend to accommodate all of the attendees. In 2011, Bishop Michael F. Burbidge announced the construction of a new cathedral to replace Sacred Heart, which could no longer accommodate the growing parish and diocese. Fund-raising began in September of that year for the new facility, and it is located on the 39 acres (16 ha) where the diocesan offices and Cardinal Gibbons High School were formerly located. Groundbreaking for the new Holy Name of Jesus Cathedral took place January 3, 2015. Built for $41 million and seating 2,000 people, the new cathedral was dedicated on July 26, 2017. Sacred Heart continues to be used for daily Mass, weddings, and funerals but no longer holds Sunday Mass.

== School ==
Cathedral School is a Pre-K through eighth-grade school located next to Sacred Heart Church. The school was established in 1909 and educates young Catholics and prepares them for High School. Cathedral School feeds into Cardinal Gibbons High School. Cardinal Gibbons High School had originally been at Sacred Heart Cathedral and was called Sacred Heart High School and then Cathedral Latin High School. In 2007, Cathedral School received a National Blue Ribbon of Excellence Award. The Cathedral School will move to the new cathedral site when complete.

== Gallery ==
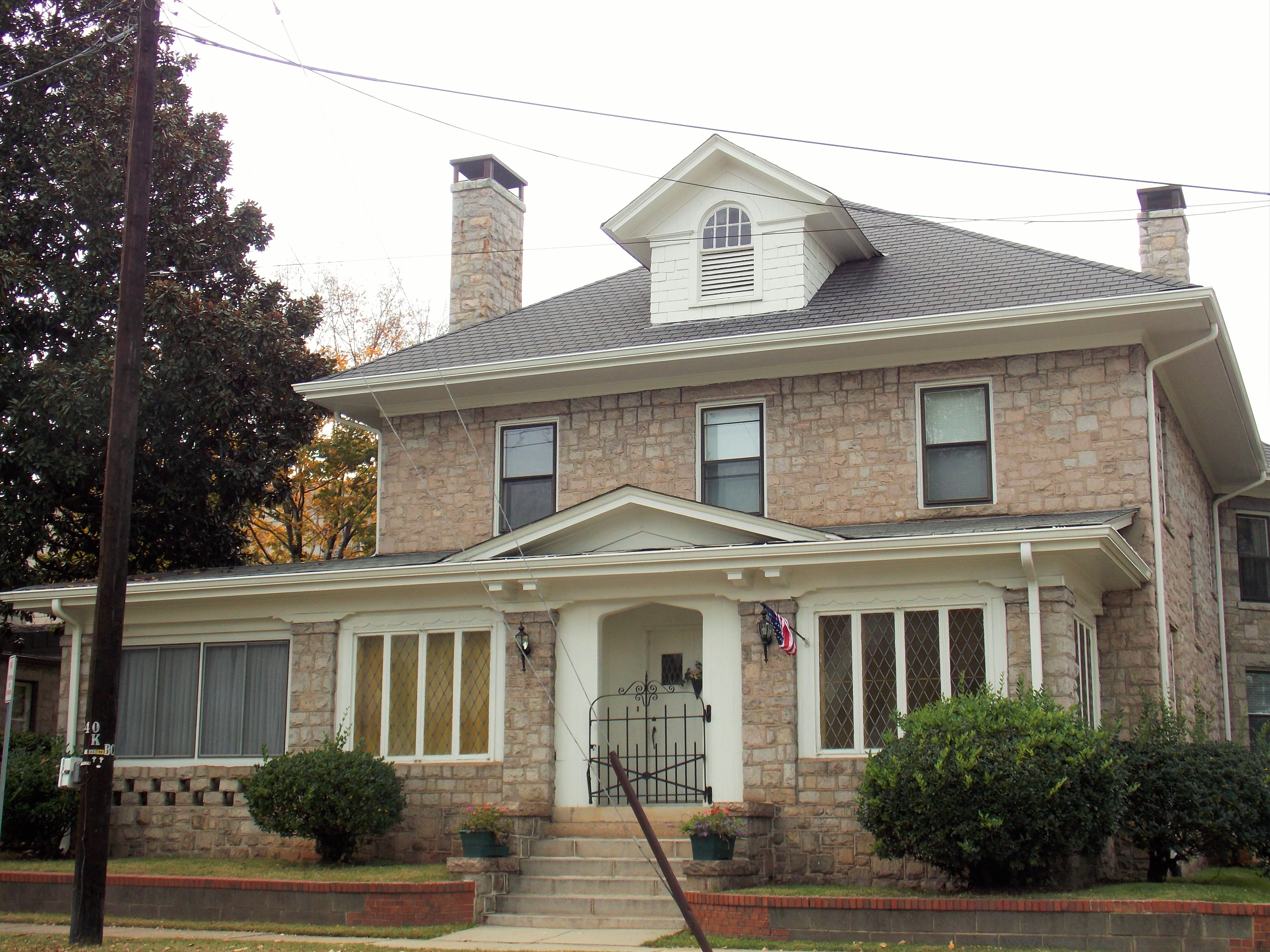
Rectory

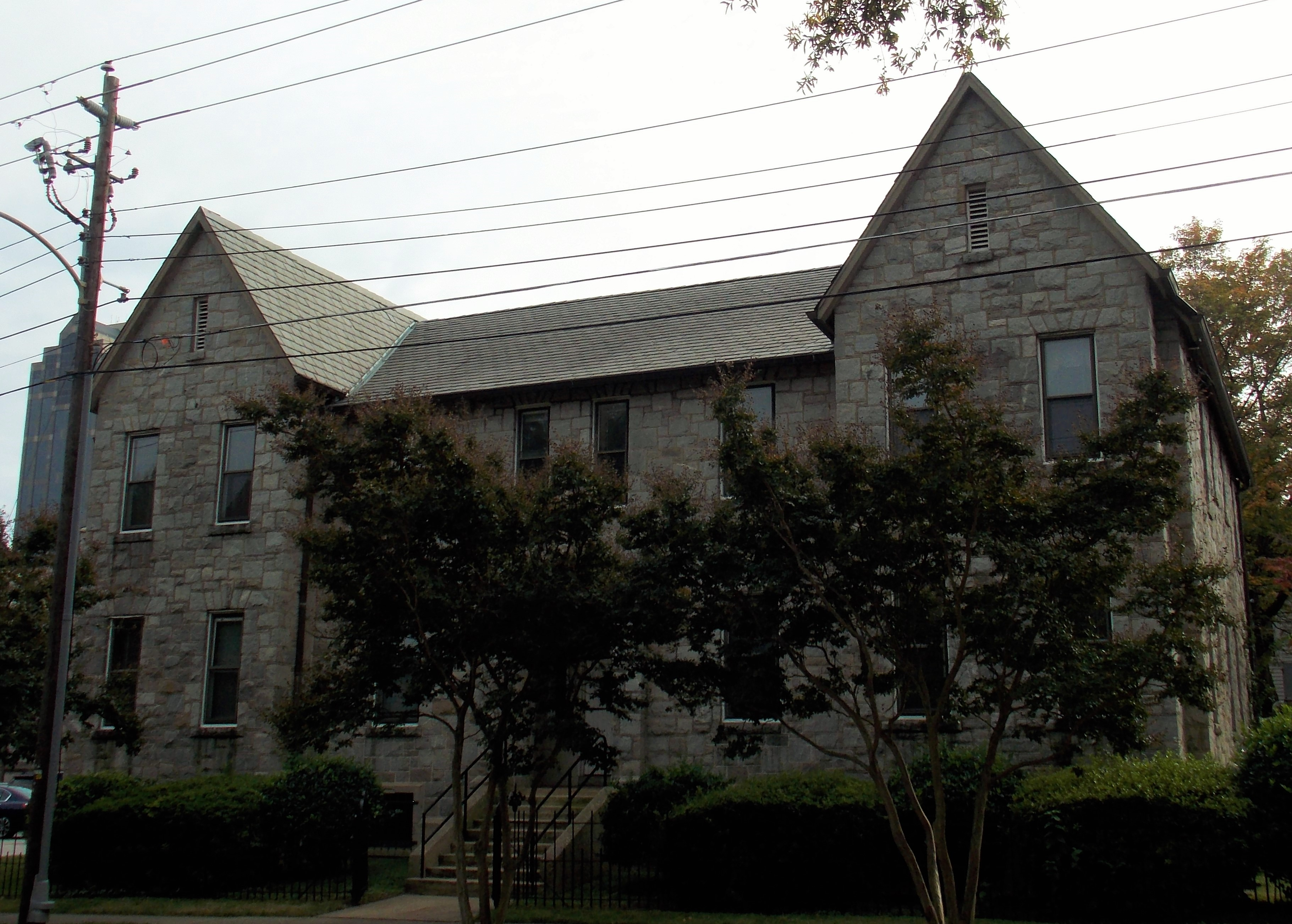
Convent

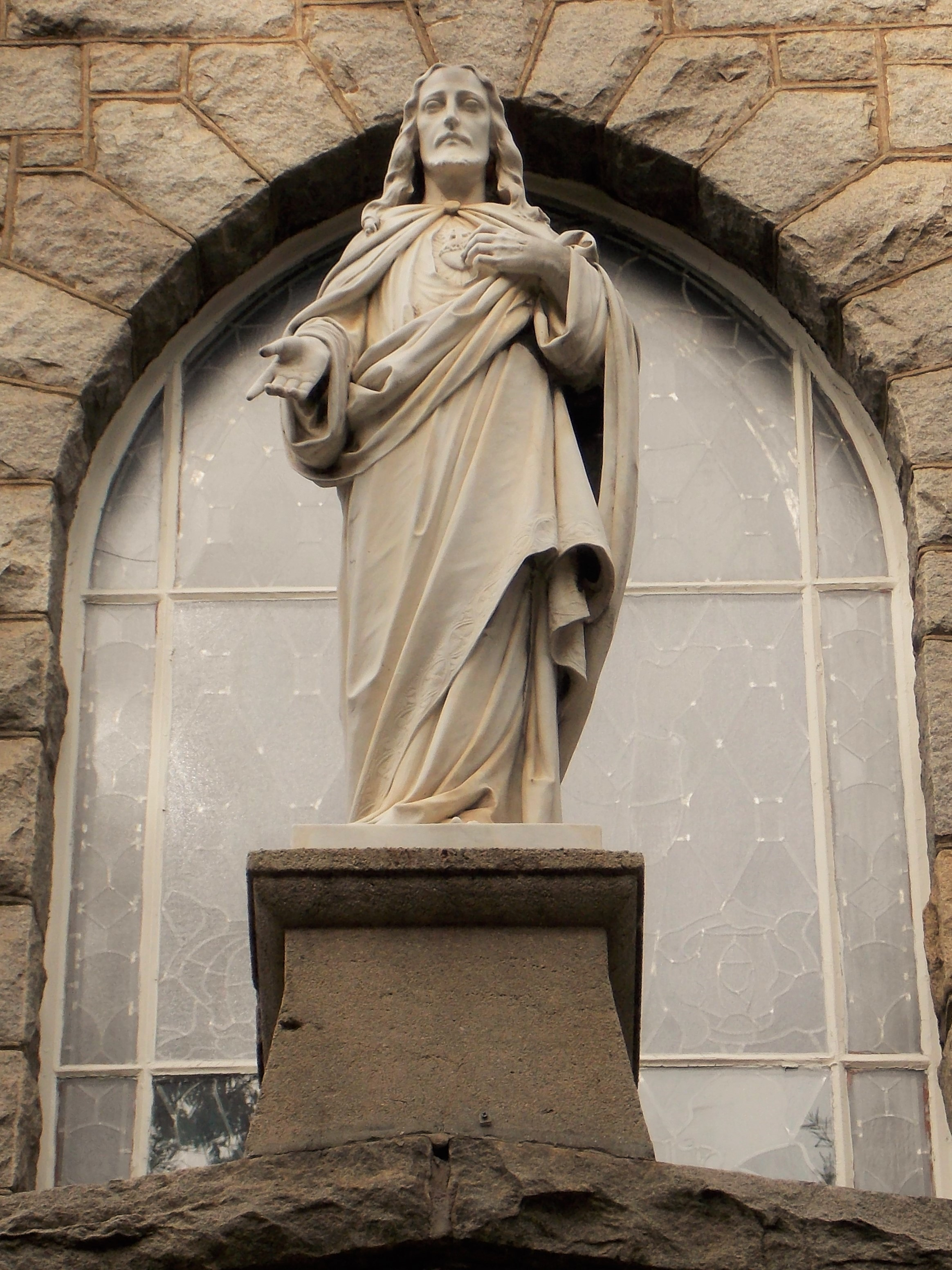
Sacred Heart statue above the main entrance.

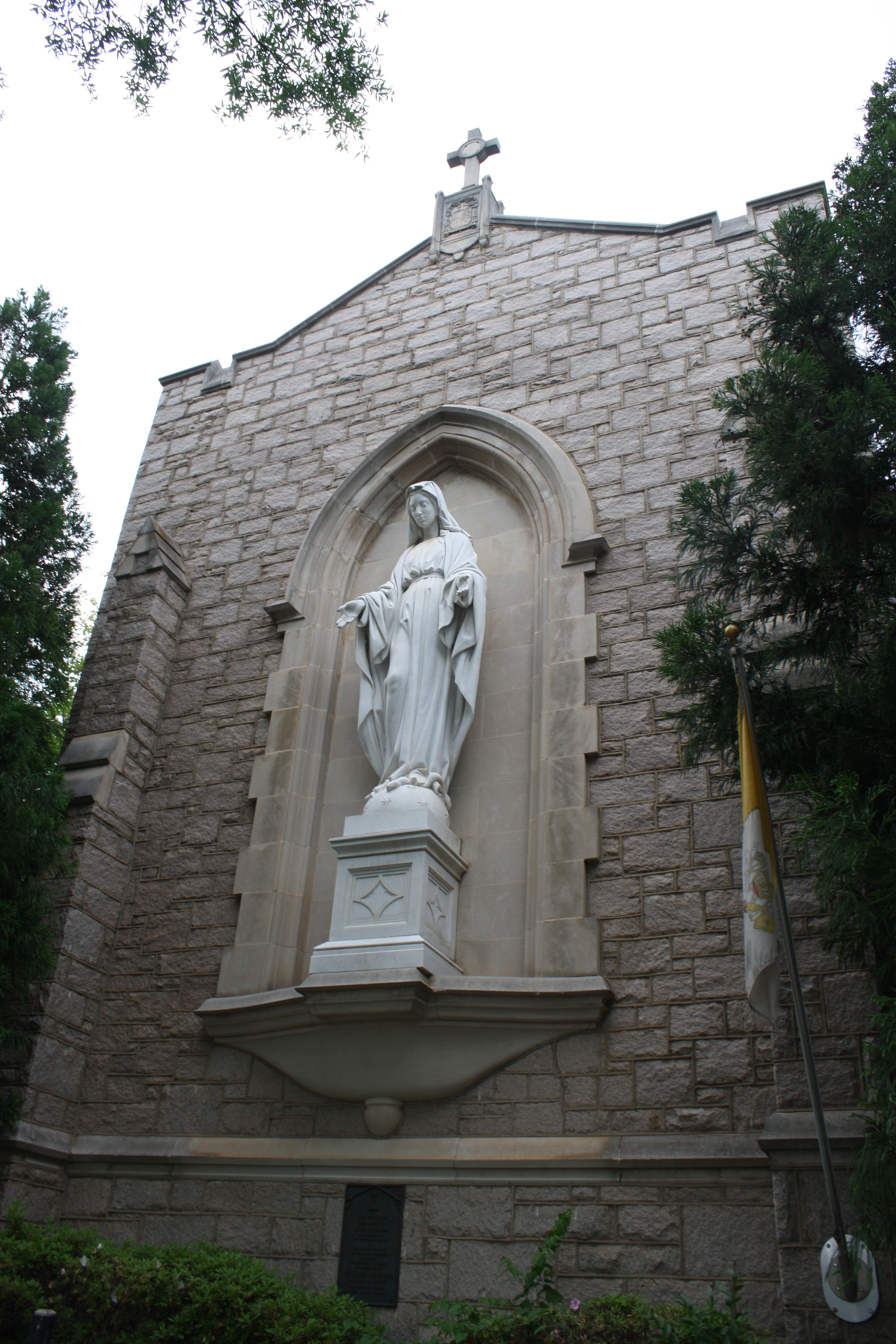
Statue of Our Lady of North Carolina at the front of the school.

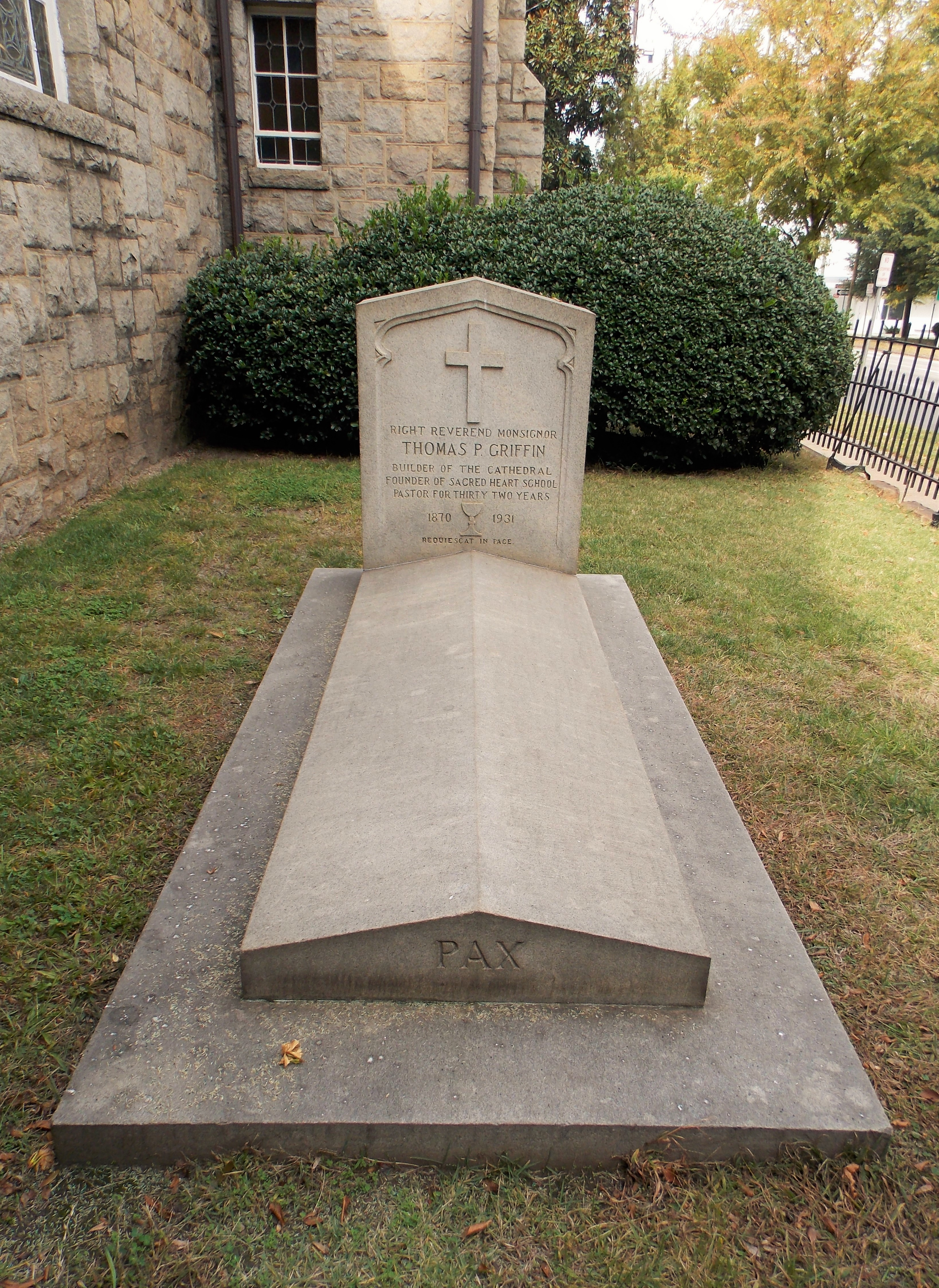
Grave of Msgr. Thomas P. Griffin who built the church and founded the school.
