= F. Joseph Gossman =

American prelate

His Excellency, The Most Reverend Francis Joseph Gossman
- Bishop of Raleigh; Titular Bishop of Aguntum
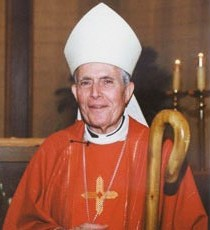
- Diocese: Diocese of Raleigh
- Installed: April 8, 1975
- Term ended: June 8, 2006
- Predecessor: Vincent Stanislaus Waters
- Successor: Michael Francis Burbidge
- Other posts: Vice-chancellor of Baltimore; Assistant pastor of the Basilica of the Assumption; Administrator of the Cathedral of Mary Our Queen; Auxiliary Bishop of Baltimore

Orders
- Ordination: December 17, 1955 by Martin John O’Connor
- Consecration: September 11, 1968 by Lawrence Shehan

Personal details
- Born: April 1, 1930 Baltimore, Maryland, US
- Died: August 12, 2013 (aged 83) Raleigh, North Carolina, US
- Denomination: Roman Catholic
- Residence: Raleigh, North Carolina, US
- Parents: Frank Gossman and Genevieve Steadman Gossman
- Education: St. Mary's Seminary; Pontifical Gregorian University, Catholic University of America

Styles of F. Joseph Gossman
- Reference style: The Most Reverend
- Spoken style: Your Excellency
- Religious style: Bishop
- Posthumous style: not applicable

Francis Joseph Gossman (April 1, 1930 – August 12, 2013) was an American prelate of the Roman Catholic Church. He served as bishop of the Diocese of Raleigh in North Carolina from 1975 to 2006.

== Biography ==
=== Early life ===
Francis Gossman was born on April 1, 1930, in Baltimore, Maryland, to Frank and Genevieve (née Steadman) Gossman. He attended St. Charles College in Ellicott City, Maryland. He then entered St. Mary's Seminary in Baltimore, where he obtained a bachelor's degree in 1952. Gossman furthered his studies at the Pontifical North American College in Rome.

=== Priesthood ===
Gossman was ordained a priest for the Archdiocese of Baltimore by Archbishop Martin O’Connor in Rome on December 17, 1955. He earned a Licentiate of Sacred Theology from the Pontifical Gregorian University in 1956. Upon his return to the United States, Gossman began his graduate studies at the Catholic University of America School of Canon Law in Washington, D.C., receiving a Doctor of Canon Law degree in June 1959.

In 1963, Gossman participated in the March on Washington for Jobs and Freedom, organized by several African-American civil rights organizations.

Gossman then served as vice-chancellor for the Archdiocese of Baltimore and assistant pastor at the Basilica of the Assumption in Baltimore. In 1968, he was named administrator of the Cathedral of Mary Our Queen in Baltimore. Gossman was raised by the Vatican to the rank of monsignor on June 27, 1965.

=== Auxiliary Bishop of Baltimore ===
On July 15, 1968, Gossman was appointed auxiliary bishop of Baltimore and titular bishop of Aguntum by Pope Paul VI. He received his episcopal consecration on September 11, 1968, in Baltimore from Cardinal Lawrence Sheehan, with Bishops Thomas Murphy and Thomas Mardaga serving as co-consecrators. As an auxiliary bishop, Gossman served as vicar for inner city Baltimore.

=== Bishop of Raleigh ===
Paul VI named Gossman as the fourth bishop of Raleigh on April 8, 1975. After a 31-year-long tenure and reaching the mandatory retirement age of 75, his resignation was accepted by Pope Benedict XVI on June 8, 2006.

=== Death and legacy ===
Francis Gossman died in Raleigh from a long-term illness on August 12, 2013, at age 83.

The Cardinal Gibbons High School in Raleigh gives the Bishop F. Joseph Gossman Award each year to a high school senior with high personal, spiritual and academic achievement.

== See also ==
- Catholic Church hierarchy
- Catholic Church in the United States
- Historical list of the Catholic bishops of the United States
- List of Catholic bishops of the United States
- Lists of patriarchs, archbishops, and bishops

== Notes ==
Catholic Church titles
Preceded by Vincent Stanislaus Waters	Bishop of Raleigh; 1975–2006	Succeeded by Michael Francis Burbidge
Preceded by –	Auxiliary Bishop of Baltimore; 1968–1975	Succeeded by –
