= Cardinal Gibbons High School (North Carolina) =

Private Catholic school in North Carolina

Location
- 1401 Edwards Mill Road; Raleigh, North Carolina 27607; United States; 35°48′10″N 78°43′44″W

Information
- Type: Private
- Motto: Cum Deo Omnia Possum
- Religious affiliation: Catholic
- Established: 1909 (117 years ago)
- CEEB code: 343205
- Head of school: Jeff Bell
- Chaplain: Fr. John Kane
- Faculty: 79
- Grades: 9–12
- Gender: Coeducational
- Enrollment: 1,545 (2021)
- Colors: Green and gold
- Athletics: NCHSAA 7A
- Athletics conference: Triangle Six 6A/7A
- Nickname: Crusaders
- Accreditation: Southern Association of Colleges and Schools
- Newspaper: The Crusader
- Yearbook: Landmark
- Tuition: $15,150 (Catholic rate) $20,395 (non-affiliated rate)
- Affiliation: Diocese of Raleigh
- Art and Literary Magazine: Repeater
- Website: cghsnc.org

Cardinal Gibbons High School (CGHS) is a private coeducational college-preparatory Catholic high school in Raleigh, North Carolina. Cardinal Gibbons and St. Thomas More Academy are the only Catholic high schools in Raleigh, and two of three high schools in the Diocese of Raleigh.

== History ==
Cardinal Gibbons was originally called Sacred Heart High School, and was the first Catholic High School in Raleigh, North Carolina. The school was originally at the Pulaski Cowper mansion, which was later transformed into Sacred Heart Cathedral, the smallest cathedral in the continental United States. The school was later named "Cathedral Latin High School." In 1962 a new school building opened on Western Boulevard in Raleigh and the school was renamed "Cardinal Gibbons Memorial High School." The site was used for an orphanage until the 1950s. Cathedral School still exists as an elementary and middle school which feeds into Cardinal Gibbons High. The school currently occupies a campus on Edwards Mill Road, which was completed in 1999. The former school site is the new location for Holy Name of Jesus Cathedral.

== Athletics ==
Cardinal Gibbons are members of the North Carolina High School Athletic Association (NCHSAA), and are currently classified as a 7A high school. The schools team name is the Crusaders, with the school colors being green and gold. Listed below are sports offered at Cardinal Gibbons.

- Boys sports: Baseball, Basketball, Cross Country, Football, Golf, Lacrosse, Soccer, Swimming, Tennis, Track & Field, Wrestling
- Girls sports: Basketball, Cheerleading, Cross Country, Dance Team, Field Hockey, Flag Football, Golf, Lacrosse, Soccer, Softball, Swimming, Tennis, Track & Field, Volleyball

The 2021 Cardinal Gibbons Crusaders football team won the school's first football state championship, by defeating the Julius L. Chambers Cougars 14-2 in the NCHSAA 4A (North Carolina's former highest classification for high school athletics) state championship game at NC State's Carter-Finley Stadium.

== Notable alumni ==
- Vernetta Alston, politician
- Claire Curzan, World Champion swimmer and Olympic silver medalist at the 2020 Summer Olympics
- Conor Donovan, professional soccer player
- Christina Gibbons, professional soccer player
- Jeremy Kelly, professional soccer player
- Jaden Lucas Miller, American actor
- Morgan Reid, professional soccer player
- Max Schrock, MLB second baseman
- Julie Shea, runner and politician
- Leigh Smith, Olympic javelin thrower at the 2008 Summer Olympics

== See also ==
- National Catholic Educational Association
- St. Thomas More Academy
