= Jillian Johnson =

American politician

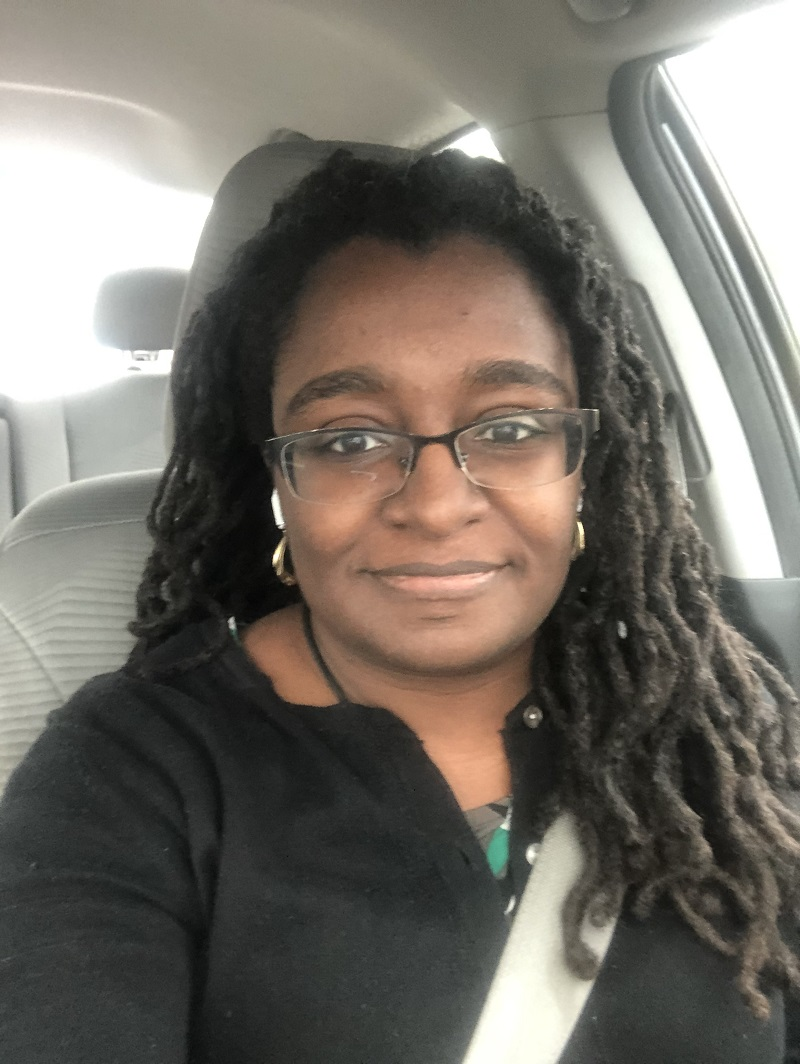
- Johnson in 2020

Durham City Councilwoman
- In office 2015–2023

Mayor Pro Tempore of Durham, North Carolina
- In office 2017–2021
- Succeeded by: Mark-Anthony Middleton

Personal details
- Born: Charlottesville, Virginia
- Party: Democratic
- Children: 2
- Education: Maggie L. Walker Governor's School for Government and International Studies; Duke University
- Occupation: politician, non-profit administrator
- Website: jillianjohnson.net

Jillian Johnson is an American politician and non-profit administrator. From 2015 to 2023, she served on the Durham City Council, and was the first LGBTQ member to be elected to the council. From 2017 to 2021, she served as the Mayor Pro-Tempore of Durham, North Carolina.

== Early life and education ==
Johnson grew up in Virginia and attended the Maggie L. Walker Governor's School for Government and International Studies in Richmond. In 1999, she moved to Durham, North Carolina to attend Duke University. She graduated in 2003 with a bachelor of arts degree in public policy and a minor in women's studies.

== Career ==
Johnson is a member of the Democratic Party. She was elected to the Durham City Council in 2015, focusing her campaign on racial, economic, and environmental justice, police accountability, and equitable development. Upon her election to office, she became the first openly LGBTQ person elected to the city council and, at the time of her swearing in, was the youngest member of the council. In 2017, she was chosen, by unanimous vote from the council, to serve as Mayor Pro Tempore of Durham until 2021. She was re-elected to her second term on the council in 2019.

Johnson was appointed by the mayor to serve on the Audit Services Oversight Committee, the Durham Housing Authority Board, the Human Relations Commission, the Joint City-County Committee, the Mayor's Council For Women, the Participatory Budgeting Steering Committee, the Race Equity Commission, the Racial Equity Task Force, the Workers' Rights Commission, and the Council Subcommittee on Housing. She was also appointed as the Vice Chair of the Council Procedures Committee and as an alternate member of the Durham Bicycle and Pedestrian Advisory Commission and the Community Safety and Wellness Task Force. She also foused on police reform and funding alternative programs to assist in crisis response.

In February 2019, Johnson and then-councilwoman Vernetta Alston were both disinvited from speaking at a Black History Month celebration held at Immaculata Catholic School. Alston and Johnson were originally invited by the school's African-American Heritage Committee as part of the school's "Influential African American Women" theme. The invitation was rescinded after there were threats to protest the event due to Alston and Johnson being openly gay public officials. Fr. Christopher VanHaight, the pastor at Immaculate Conception Catholic Church and Head of Immaculata Catholic School, said he made the decision to rescind the invitation and close the school for a day after receiving messages from some school parents voicing concern about having a "pro-gay marriage" politician speak at the school He also stated that the school "needed a break from politicians." Fr. VanHaight's decision was supported by Bishop Luis R. Zarama and the Diocese of Raleigh.

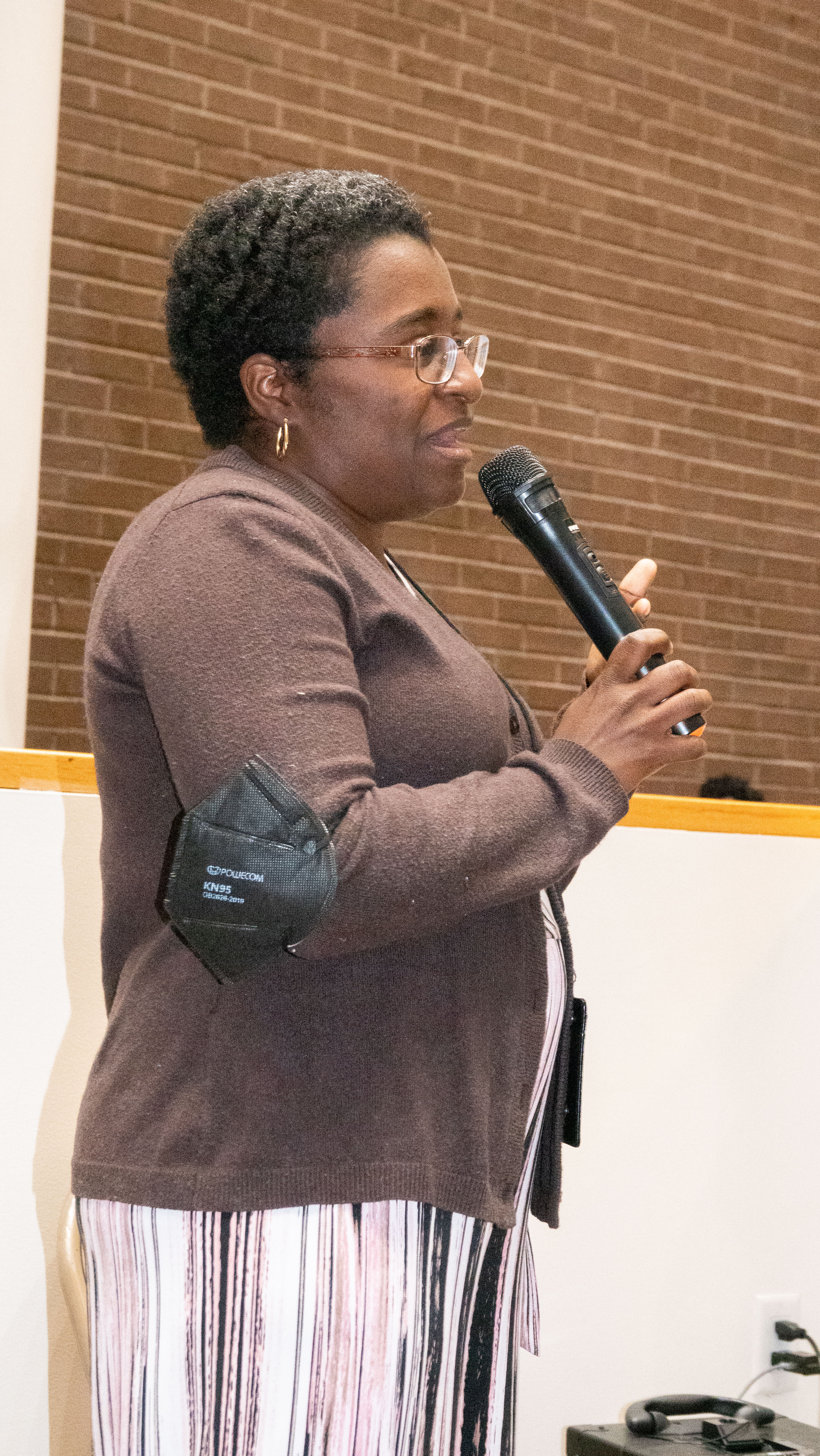
Johnson at a city council event in 2022

In April 2020 Johnson, alongside Durham mayor Steve Schewel, Durham County Board of Commissioners chairwoman Wendy Jacobs, Durham County Commissioner Heidi Carter, Durham City Council members Javiera Caballero, Mark-Anthony Middleton, and Charlie Reece, and Raleigh City Council members Saige Martin and Nicole Stewart, pledged to take part in the #ShareYourCheck Challenge. They pledged all or part of their federal stimulus payments, part of an aid package to help Americans through the COVID-19 recession onset by the COVID-19 pandemic, to go to Siembra Solidarity Fund. The fund helps undocumented residents who were shut out of financial assistance due to their immigration status.

Since June 2020, Johnson has served as the North Carolina State Advisor for Movement Voter Project. She is also the co-founder of Durham for All and a co-founder and board co-chair of Southern Vision Alliance. In March 2022, she was elected as co-chair of Local Progress, a networking organization for elected officials, and is co-chair of the organization's North Carolina chapter.

In March 2023, allegations of extorsion were made against another Durham city council member, Monique Holsey-Hyman. Johnson spoke at a meeting, addressing the allegations against Holsey-Hyman, saying that the allegations "reflect on our entire council, our city, our commitments to our community, and the way we use our power and authority." Johnson introduced a resolution to censure Holsey-Hyman, which was set to be voted on at the meeting on April 3.

In June 2023, Johnson announced that she was not running for a third term, and would be continuing work in grantmaking as the North Carolina State Advisor for Movement Voter Project. She left office that year.

== Personal life ==
Johnson lives in Durham with her partner and two children.
