= Diocese of Raleigh =

Latin Catholic ecclesiastical jurisdiction in North Carolina, United States

Coordinates: 35.7769°N 78.6728°W

Diocese of Raleigh Diœcesis Raleighiensis
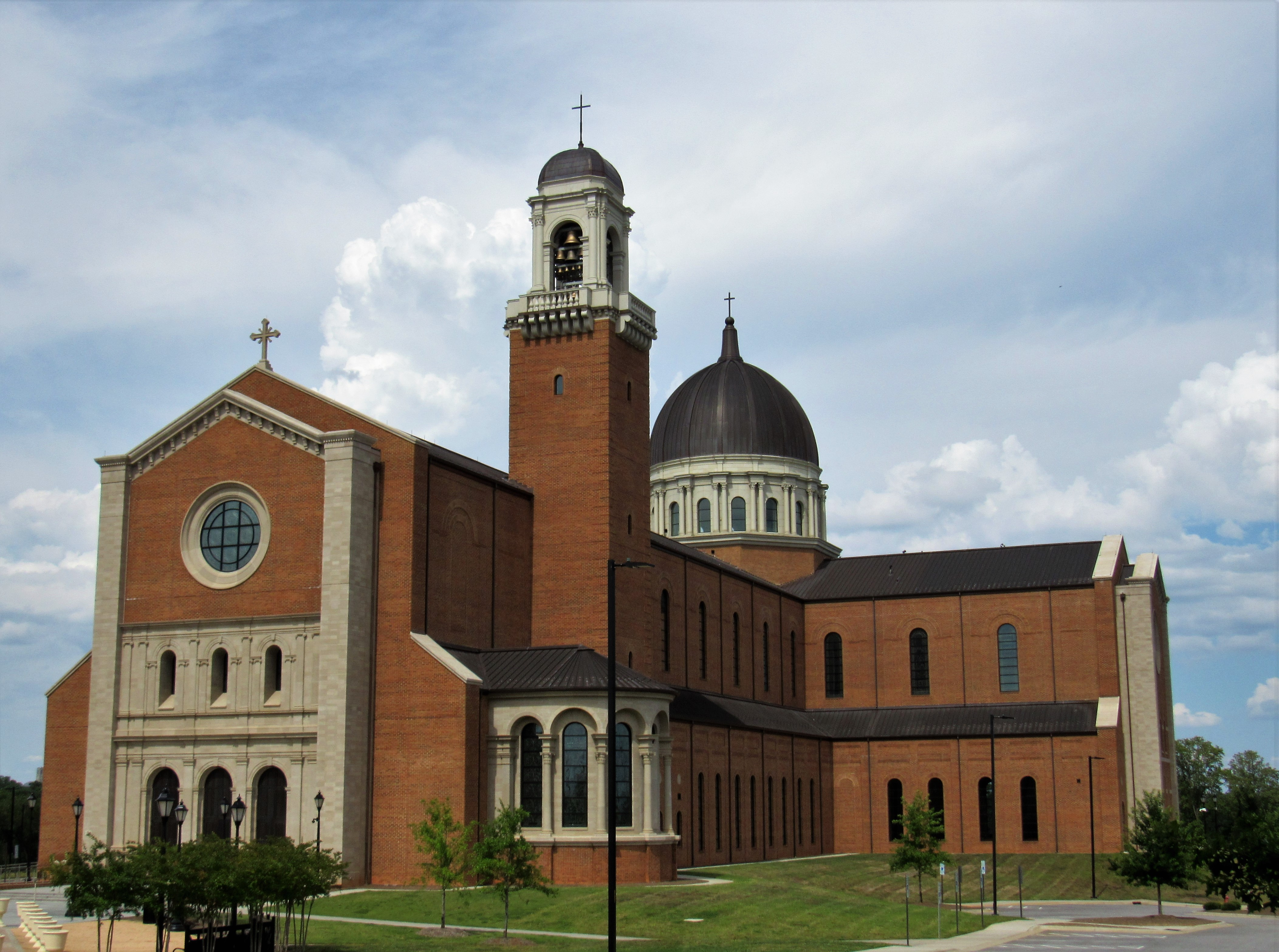
- Holy Name of Jesus Cathedral

- Coat of arms

Location
- Country: United States
- Territory: Eastern half of North Carolina
- Ecclesiastical province: Atlanta
- Metropolitan: Atlanta

Statistics
- Area: 31,875 km^{2} (12,307 sq mi)
- Population: Total; Catholics: (as of 2025); 5,305,066.; 510,000 (9.6%)
- Parishes: 81

Information
- Denomination: Catholic
- Sui iuris church: Latin Church
- Rite: Roman Rite
- Established: March 3, 1868 (158 years ago)
- Cathedral: Holy Name of Jesus Cathedral

Current leadership
- Pope: Leo XIV
- Bishop: Luis Rafael Zarama
- Metropolitan Archbishop: Gregory John Hartmayer

Map
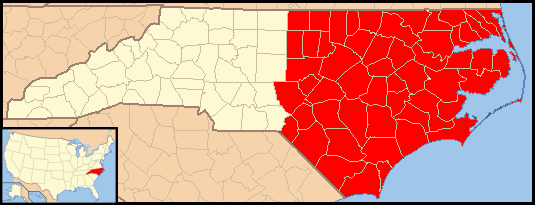

Website
- dioceseofraleigh.org

The Diocese of Raleigh (Latin: Dioecesis Raleighiensis) is a diocese of the Catholic Church that covers eastern North Carolina in the United States. It is a suffragan diocese of the Archdiocese of Atlanta. The bishop is Luis Rafael Zarama. Holy Name of Jesus Cathedral in Raleigh was recently consecrated.

== Territory ==
The Diocese of Raleigh encompasses the counties of Beaufort, Bertie, Bladen, Brunswick, Camden, Carteret, Caswell, Chatham, Chowan, Columbus, Craven, Cumberland, Currituck, Dare, Duplin, Durham, Edgecombe, Franklin, Gates, Granville, Greene, Halifax, Harnett, Hertford, Hoke, Hyde, Johnston, Jones, Lee, Lenoir, Martin, Nash, New Hanover, Northampton, Onslow, Orange, Pamlico, Pasquotank, Pender, Perquimans, Person, Pitt, Randolph, Robeson, Rockingham, Sampson, Scotland, Tyrrell, Vance, Wake, Warren, Washington, Wayne, and Wilson in North Carolina.

== Statistics ==
As of 2025, the Diocese of Raleigh was divided into eight deaneries, with 81 parishes, 13 missions and four campus ministries. The total population is 5,305,066, with 510,000 Catholics who are served by 171 diocesan and religious order priests.

== History ==
=== 1700 to 1868 ===
Before and during the American Revolutionary War, the Catholics in all of the British colonies in America were under the jurisdiction of the Apostolic Vicariate of the London District in England. Discrimination and persecution of Catholics in the North Carolina colony was common until it became a royal colony in 1729. Anyone wanting to hold public office had to sign an oath stating that Protestantism was the true Christian faith. With the passage of the U.S. Constitution in 1789 after the American Revolution, Catholics were guaranteed freedom of worship throughout the new nation.

Pope Pius VI erected the Prefecture Apostolic of the United States in 1784, encompassing the entire United States. Five years later, he converted the prefecture into the Diocese of Baltimore. The Diocese of Charleston was erected by Pope Pius VII on July 11, 1820. The new diocese included states of Georgia, North Carolina, and South Carolina, all removed from the Archdiocese of Baltimore.

During the early 19th century, Irish Catholic immigrants started entering North Carolina to work on the railroads and other construction projects. The first Catholic church in Raleigh was built in 1834. By 1860, there were 350 Catholics living in seven North Carolina parishes.

Coat of arms of the former Vicariate Apostolic of North Carolina (1868–1924; coat of arms first used in 1911).

=== 1868 to 1924 ===
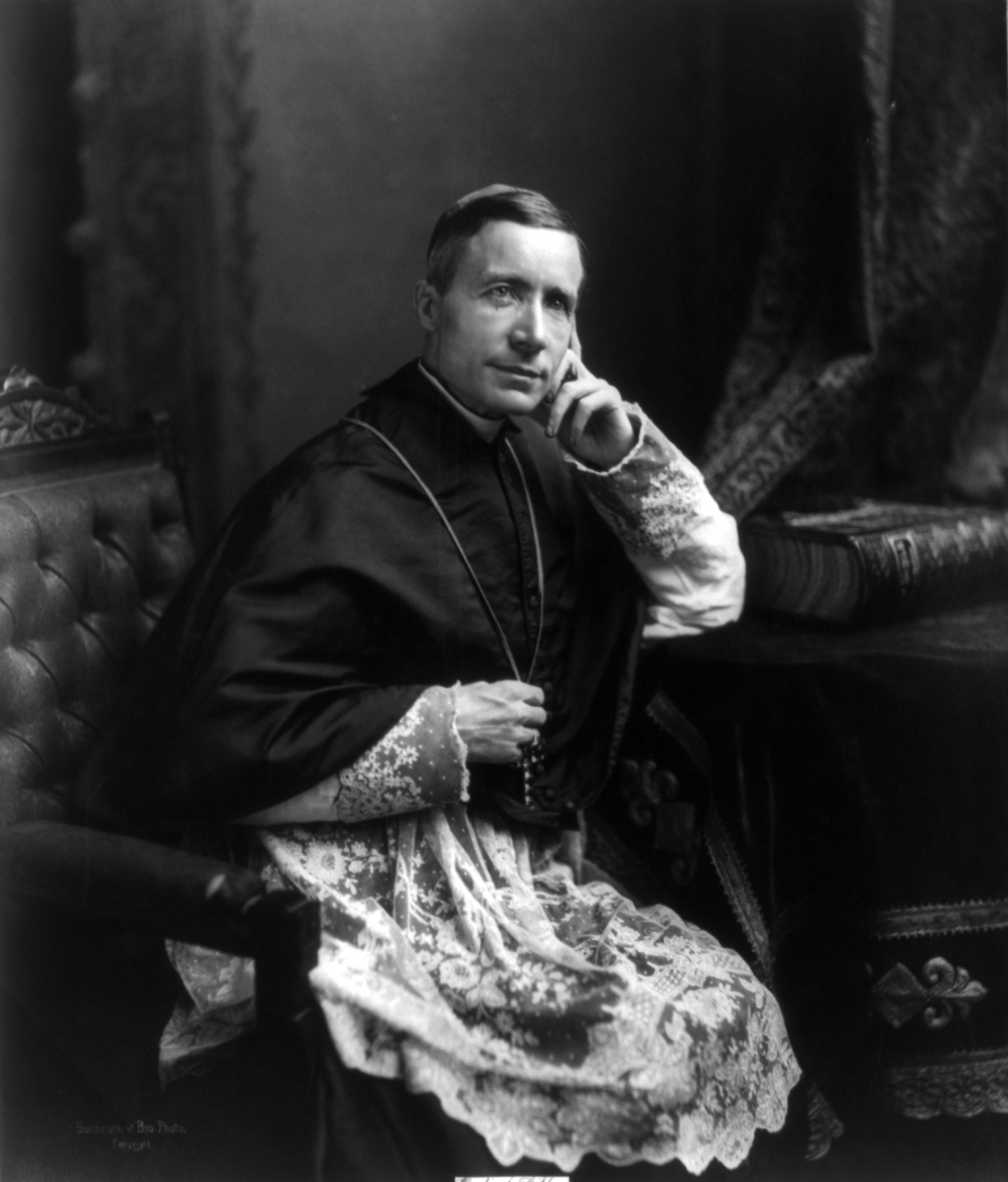
Bishop Gibbons (1886)

On March 3, 1868, Pope Pius IX erected the Vicariate Apostolic of North Carolina, removing all of North Carolina from the Diocese of Charleston. At that time, the pope James Gibbons as the first vicar apostolic.

When Gibbons became vicar apostolic, North Carolina counted fewer than 700 Catholics. In his first four weeks in office, he traveled almost a thousand miles, visiting towns and mission stations and administering the sacraments. He also befriended many Protestants, who greatly outnumbered Catholics in the state, and preached at their churches. Gibbons made many converts to Catholicism. In 1872, Pius IX appointed Gibbons as bishop of the Diocese of Richmond. The Vatican would not replace Gibbons in North Carolina for the next 11 years. In 1876, Benedictine monks from St. Vincent's Archabbey in Latrobe, Pennsylvania, arrived in Belmont to establish Belmont priory.

In 1881, Leo XIII appointed Henry P. Northrop as the new vicar apostolic of North Carolina. Two years later, the pope named Northrup to also serve as bishop of the Diocese of Charlotte. Northrup held both positions until 1888, when the Vatican allowed him to resign as vicar apostolic and only serve as bishop of Charleston.

In 1888, Leo XIII appointed Leo Michael Haid to replace Northrup as apostolic vicar of North Carolina, while allow Haid to remain as abbot of Belmont. In 1910, Pope Pius X designated Belmont Abbey as a territorial abbey, giving it control of eight counties from the Vicariate Apostolic of North Carolina to Belmont Abbey. Haid now led two different Catholic jurisdictions in North Carolina. Haid died in 1924.

=== 1924 to 1962 ===
On December 12, 1924, Pope Pius XI elevated the Apostolic Vicariate of North Carolina into the Diocese of Raleigh, making it the first Catholic diocese in North Carolina. The pope appointed Monsignor William Hafey of Baltimore as its first bishop. In 1937, Pius XI named Hafey as coadjutor bishop of the Diocese of Scranton. To replace Hafey as bishop of Raleigh, the pope appointed Monsignor Eugene J. McGuinness from the Archdiocese of Philadelphia that same year. In 1944, Pope Pius XII transferred seven counties from Belmont Abbey to the Diocese of Raleigh. Later in 1944, Pius XII named McGuiness as bishop of the Diocese of Oklahoma City.

Pius XII appointed Monsignor Vincent Waters from the Diocese of Richmond as the new bishop of Raleigh in 1944. Waters was accused by some of the diocesan clergy of holding on to idle church property worth millions of dollars while some parishes were in debt. He also denied requests for the creation of a priests' senate; 20% of his priests sent a request to the Vatican asking for Waters' removal. In 1953, Waters ordered the racial desegregation of all Catholic churches and schools in the diocese. He described racial segregation as a product of "darkness," and declared that "the time has come for it to end." He also said,

"I am not unmindful, as a Southerner, of the force of this virus of prejudice among some persons in the South, as well as in the North. I know, however, that there is a cure for this virus, and that is our faith."

Pope John XXIII transferred Gaston County, Belmont Abbey's last county, to the Diocese of Raleigh in 1960. Although it remained a territorial abbey, Belmont now only had jurisdiction over its own campus. In 1962, John XXIII elevated the Diocese of Atlanta to the Archdiocese of Atlanta. He designated the Diocese of Raleigh and Belmont Abbey as suffragans of the new archdiocese.

=== 1962 to present ===
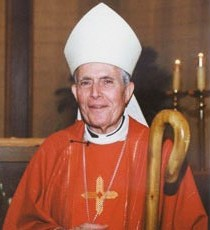
Bishop Gosman (2010)

In 1962, John XXIII elevated the Diocese of Atlanta to the Archdiocese of Atlanta and transferred the Diocese of Raleigh to it from the Archdiocese of Baltimore. Pope Paul VI in 1971 erected the Diocese of Charlotte. He removed Belmont Abbey and several counties from the Diocese of Raleigh. This action created the current boundaries of the Diocese of Raleigh. In 1972, Waters expelled five Sisters of Providence nuns from the diocese for not wearing their religious habits while teaching.

After Waters died in 1974, Pope Paul VI appointed Auxiliary Bishop F. Joseph Gossman of Baltimore in 1975 to replace him. Gossman served as bishop in the diocese for 31 years. After his resignation in 2006, Pope Benedict XVI appointed Auxiliary Bishop Michael Burbidge of the Archdiocese of Philadelphia as the new bishop of Raleigh. In 2007, the diocese paid almost $2 million to settle sexual misconduct claims against at least 15 priests since the 1950s. In 2009, the Diocese of Raleigh established a chapter of Courage International, a Catholic ministry for LGBTQ+ Catholics.

After the tornado outbreak of April 2011, which killed 24 people in North Carolina and other states, Burbidge urged Catholics to include victims and survivors in their Holy Week prayers. He directed the diocese's parishes and mission churches to hold a special collection for a disaster relief fund to be used to help survivors. The diocese supported the 2012 North Carolina Amendment 1, which would prohibit the state from recognizing same-sex marriag]. In 2013, the diocese left the ecumenical North Carolina Council of Churches after the council spoke out against North Carolina Amendment 1. Soon after taking office, Burbidge announced the building of a new cathedral for the diocese, the Cathedral of the Holy Name of Jesus. The preparations began in 2013, and the groundbreaking was in 2014.

In 2016, Pope Francis appointed Burbidge as bishop of the Diocese of Arlington. The pope named Auxiliary Bishop Luis Zarama of Atlanta as the first Hispanic bishop of Raleigh. The Cathedral of the Holy Name of Jesus was dedicated in 2017. In August 2018, a grand jury report regarding sexual abuse in the Catholic Church in Pennsylvania named two former North Carolina priests in the list of priests with credible abuse accusations against them. In 2019, LGBTQ city councilors Vernetta Alston and Jillian Johnson were barred from speaking at a Black History Month event at the Immaculate Conception Catholic Church. In August 2025, Clemente Olvera Guerrero, a pastor, was charged with soliciting prostitution and was swiftly removed from the ministry by the diocese.

As of 2026, Zarama is the current bishop of the diocese.

== Cathedral churches ==
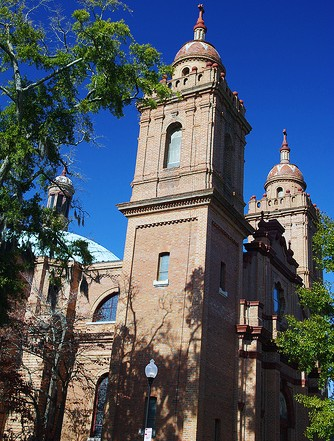
Basilica Shrine of St. Mary, Wilmington, North Carolina (2010)

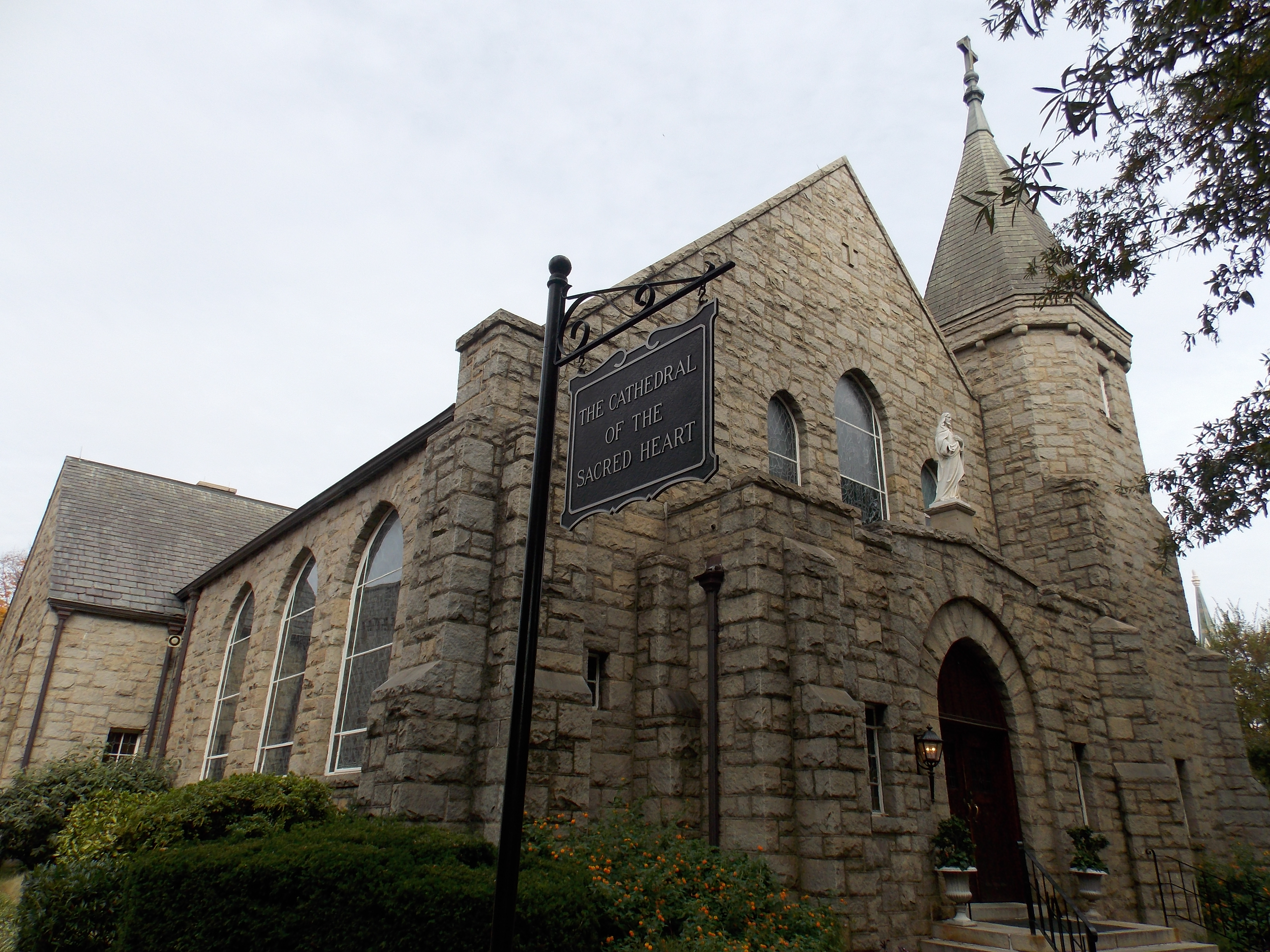
Sacred Heart Church, Raleigh, North Carolina (2015)

Holy Name of Jesus Cathedral in Raleigh is the mother church of the Diocese of Raleigh. It was designed by the architects O'Brien and Keane in the Romanesque Revival style. It contains a cruciform floor plan with a dome over the crossing. Its 42 stained glass windows and stations of the cross came from closed churches in the Archdiocese of Philadelphia. The Beyer Studio restored the windows before they were installed. Construction on the cathedral commenced in 2015 and it was dedicated in 2017.

The two former cathedrals include:

- Sacred Heart Church in Raleigh served as the diocesan cathedral from 1924 to 2017. After the dedication of Holy Name of Jesus in 2017, Sacred Heart was relegated to a parish church.
- The Basilica Shrine of St. Mary in Wilmington served as a cathedral for the Vicariate Apostolic of North Carolina until its suppression in 1924. The diocese sold the former Pro-Cathedral of St. Thomas the Apostle in Wilmington.

== Bishops ==
=== Vicars Apostolic of North Carolina ===
1. James Gibbons (1868–1877), appointed Bishop of Richmond and later Archbishop of Baltimore (elevated to Cardinal in 1886)
  - Stanislaus Mark Gross (1880) - appointed, but never actually took possession
2. Henry Pinckney Northrop (1882–1888), appointed Bishop of Charleston
3. Leo Michael Haid, O.S.B. (1888–1924), concurrently abbot of Belmont Abbey

=== Bishops of Raleigh ===
1. William J. Hafey (1925–1937), appointed Bishop of Scranton
2. Eugene J. McGuinness (1937–1945), appointed Bishop of Oklahoma City-Tulsa
3. Vincent S. Waters (1945–1974)
4. Francis J. Gossman (1975–2006)
5. Michael Francis Burbidge (2006–2016), appointed Bishop of Arlington
6. Luis Rafael Zarama (2017–present)

=== Auxiliary bishops ===
- James Johnston Navagh (1952–1957), appointed Bishop of Ogdensburg and later Bishop of Paterson
- Charles Borromeo McLaughlin (1964–1968), appointed Bishop of Saint Petersburg
- George Edward Lynch (1970–1985)

=== Other diocesan priests who became bishops ===
- Joseph Lennox Federal, appointed Auxiliary Bishop of Salt Lake in 1951
- Michael Joseph Begley, appointed Bishop of Charlotte in 1971
- Joseph Lawson Howze, appointed Auxiliary Bishop of Natchez-Jackson in 1972
- Bernard Shlesinger, appointed Auxiliary Bishop of Atlanta in 2017

== Education ==
As of 2026, the Diocese of Raleigh operated two high schools and 28 middle and primary schools with an enrollment of approximately 9653 students. The diocese also includes an independent high school run by lay staff and a high school in the Cristo Rey Network.

=== High schools ===
- Cardinal Gibbons High School – Raleigh
- John Paul II Catholic High School – Greenville
- St. Thomas More Academy – Raleigh (operated by laypeople)
- Cristo Rey Research Triangle High School – Durham

== Radio stations ==
=== WSHP-LP ===
WSHP-LP was a community low-power FM radio station that operated from 2018 to 2023. Licensed to the Diocese of Raleigh, it broadcast from Cary. WSHP-LP was operated by Divine Mercy Radio, Inc., a local lay apostolate organization. Due to its short antenna height and low power, coverage was limited to central and eastern Cary.

The initial application to construct WSHP-LP was filed in 2013, and plans for this station were announced in 2014. WSHP-LP was first licensed in February 2018. Its original programming consisted of EWTN's English service, in addition to Ave Maria Radio and locally produced religious programs and announcements. In July 2018, WSHP-LP temporarily suspended operations, as Divine Mercy prepared to transfer the EWTN programming to AM 540, WETC, which went live in February 2019. WSHP-LP resumed broadcasting in March 2019, now with Spanish language programs from EWTN's Radio Católica Mundial. The diocese surrendered WSHP-LP's license to the Federal Communications Commission in 2023.

=== WETC ===
In August 2018, the diocese made arrangements to purchase WETC, AM 540 in Wendell. After a period off the air, WETC resumed regular operations in February 2019.

=== WPJL ===
In 2024, WPJL, AM 1240 in Raleigh was sold to Divine Mercy Radio. Its community of license was changed to Knightdale, and it began simulcasting WETC's programming.

== Sources and external links ==
- Roman Catholic Diocese of Raleigh Official Site
- GCatholic with Google map ^{[self-published]}
- Catholic Hierarchy of Raleigh, North Carolina ^{[self-published]}
- NC Catholic Magazine
