= Holy Name of Jesus Cathedral (Raleigh, North Carolina) =

Church in the United States

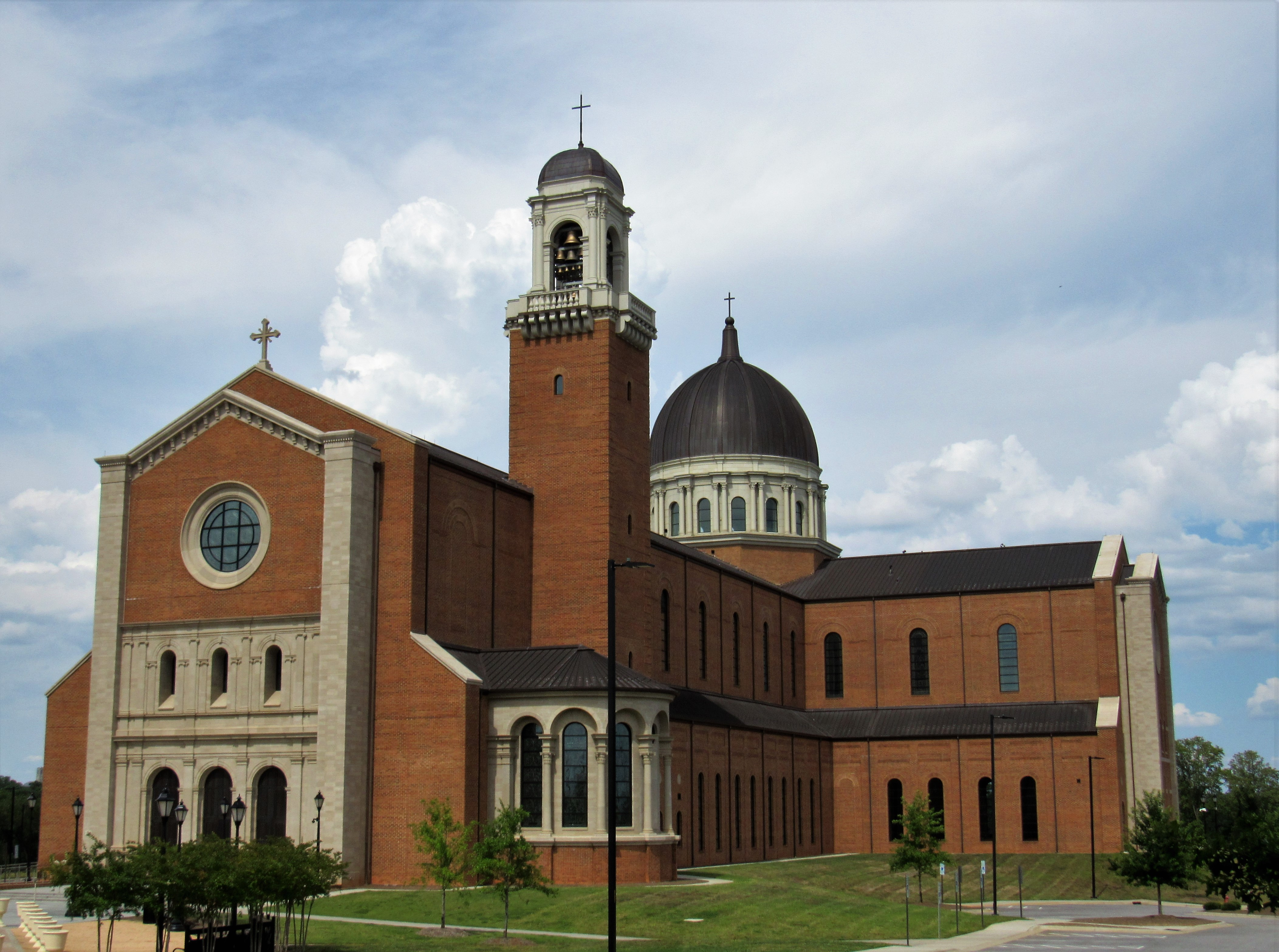

- Location within North Carolina
- 35°46′39″N 78°40′11″W
- Location: 715 Nazareth St. Raleigh, North Carolina
- Country: United States
- Denomination: Catholic Church
- Sui iuris church: Latin Church
- Website: www.raleighcathedral.org

History
- Dedicated: July 26, 2017

Architecture
- Architect(s): O'Brien and Keane
- Style: Romanesque Revival
- Groundbreaking: January 3, 2015
- Completed: 2017
- Construction cost: $46 million

Specifications
- Capacity: 2,000 sitting

Administration
- Diocese: Raleigh

Clergy
- Bishop: Luis Rafael Zarama
- Rector: Rev. Monsignor David D. Brockman

Holy Name of Jesus Cathedral is a Catholic cathedral that is the seat of the Diocese of Raleigh in Raleigh, North Carolina, in the United States. It replaced Sacred Heart Cathedral.

The cathedral accommodates more than 2,000 worshippers and serves as the site for major liturgical celebrations, pilgrimages, and events for the Catholic community of eastern North Carolina. It is the fifth largest Catholic cathedral in the United States.

== History ==
During the 20th century, the Diocese of Raleigh was served by Sacred Heart Cathedral, which was constructed in 1924. It had a seating capacity of 300 worshipers. By the early 2000s, the growth of the diocese necessitated the construction of a new, larger cathedral.

Bishop Michael F. Burbidge announced a fundraising campaign for a new cathedral in 2011. The cathedral was to be built on property that had previously served as the site of the former Cathedral Latin High School and the diocesan offices. Burbidge selected the architectural firm of O'Brien and Keane of Arlington, Virginia, to design the new building. The groundbreaking for the cathedral took place on January 3, 2015, and it was dedicated on July 26, 2017. The project cost $46 million. It is the fifth largest cathedral in the country.

In 2025, the diocese announced plans for the construction of a cemetery on the cathedral grounds.

== Cathedral exterior ==
Holy Name of Jesus Cathedral is arranged in a cruciform layout that covers approximately 43,000 square feet (4,000 m^{2}) The main axis of the building is oriented east–west, with the entrance facing the west.

=== Blessed Sacrament Chapel ===
The chapel's primary function in the cathedral is to provide a quiet space for reflection and adoration of the Blessed Sacrament. As such, the architecture presents an elevated design and incorporates the Corinthian Order. Its exterior is rendered completely in cast stone, to distinguish it from the rest of the building and denote its importance.

The chapel windows, salvaged from the former Church of the Ascension in Philadelphia, were designed by the JM Kase Company in Reading, Pennsylvania. The chapel has four windows depicting the Four Evangelists, two decorative windows, and one round window depicting an angel.

=== Cornerstone ===
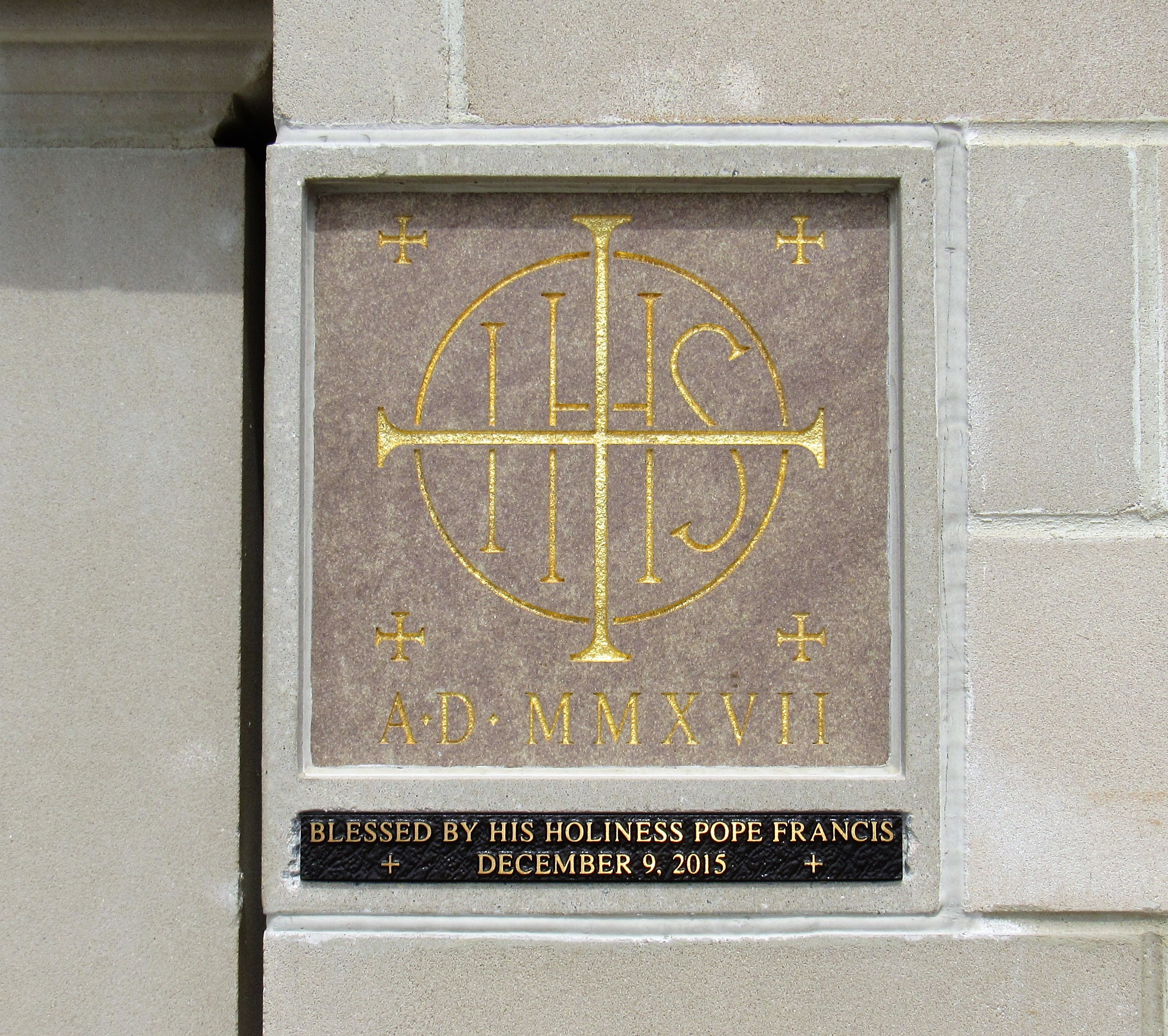
Cornerstone of cathedral (2019)

In December 2015, Burbidge presented Pope Francis with the cornerstone for the Holy Name of Jesus Cathedral for blessing. Made of Santafiora stone, it is inscribed with a christogram rendered in gold. The cornerstone was installed on July 21, 2017, five days before the dedication of the new cathedral.

=== Dome ===
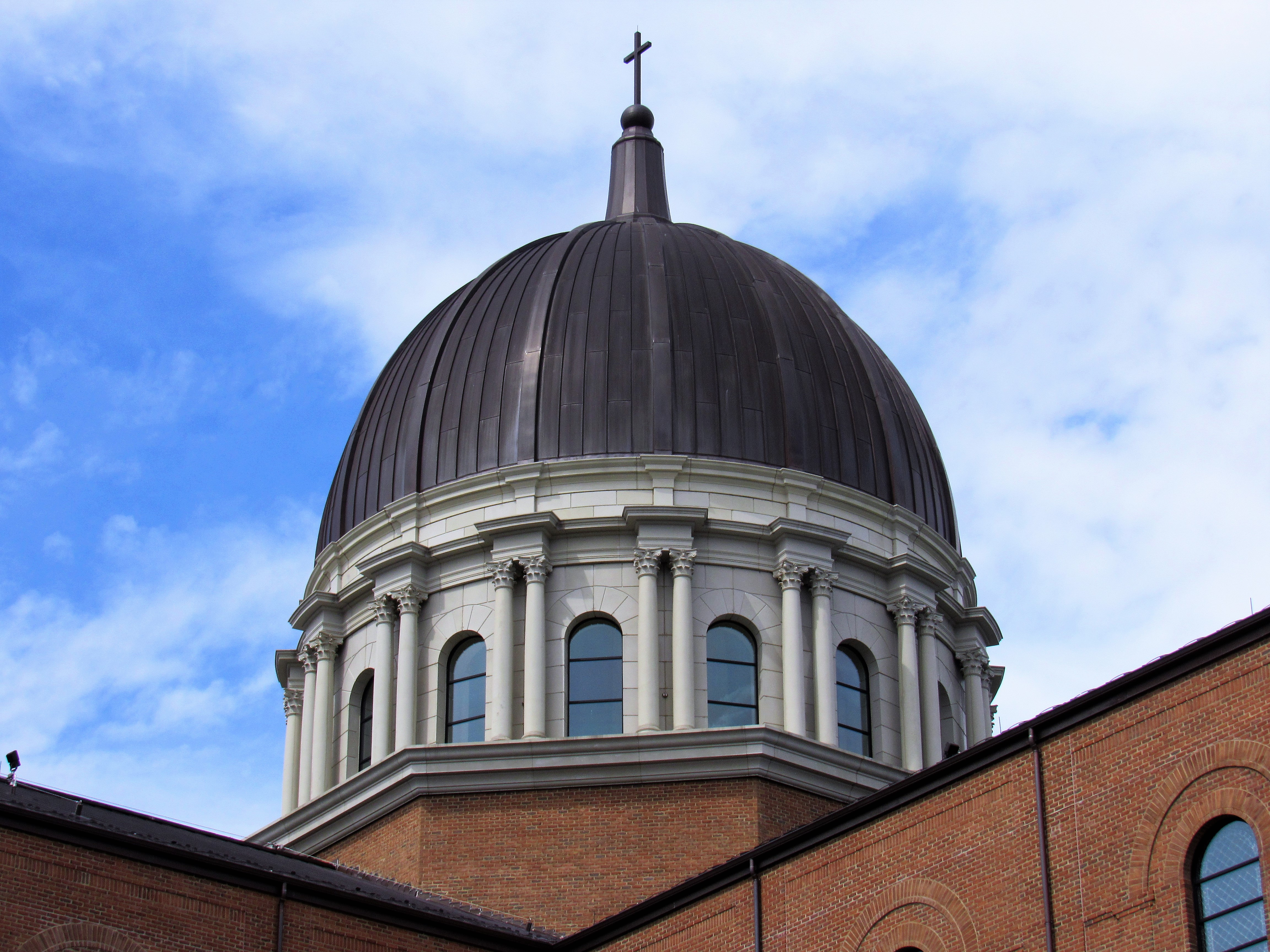
Dome (2019)

The architect of the cathedral described the significance of the dome to the structure:

The word dome itself originated in the Latin word domus, meaning home. Thereby designated as the 'home' of the diocesan family, Holy Name of Jesus Cathedral is where the faithful will gather in union with the whole Church, under the leadership of the bishop, to encounter Our Lord in Word and Sacrament. .

— James H. O'Brien, principal architect, O'Brien & Keane

The contractor assembled the 162-ton copper-clad, ribbed dome on the ground and lifted it into place using a crane. A decorative finial and a cross are installed on the top of the dome, which reaches a total height of 172 feet (52 m) .

The 137 feet (42 m) dome is composed of an inner and outer shell. A cavity between them allows for access to the engineering systems at the top of the structure. The dome interior displays Corinthian pilasters and ribs. The drum of the dome is located directly above the sanctuary platform. It displays a range of paired Corinthian columns and entablature, along with sixteen arched windows.

=== Materials ===
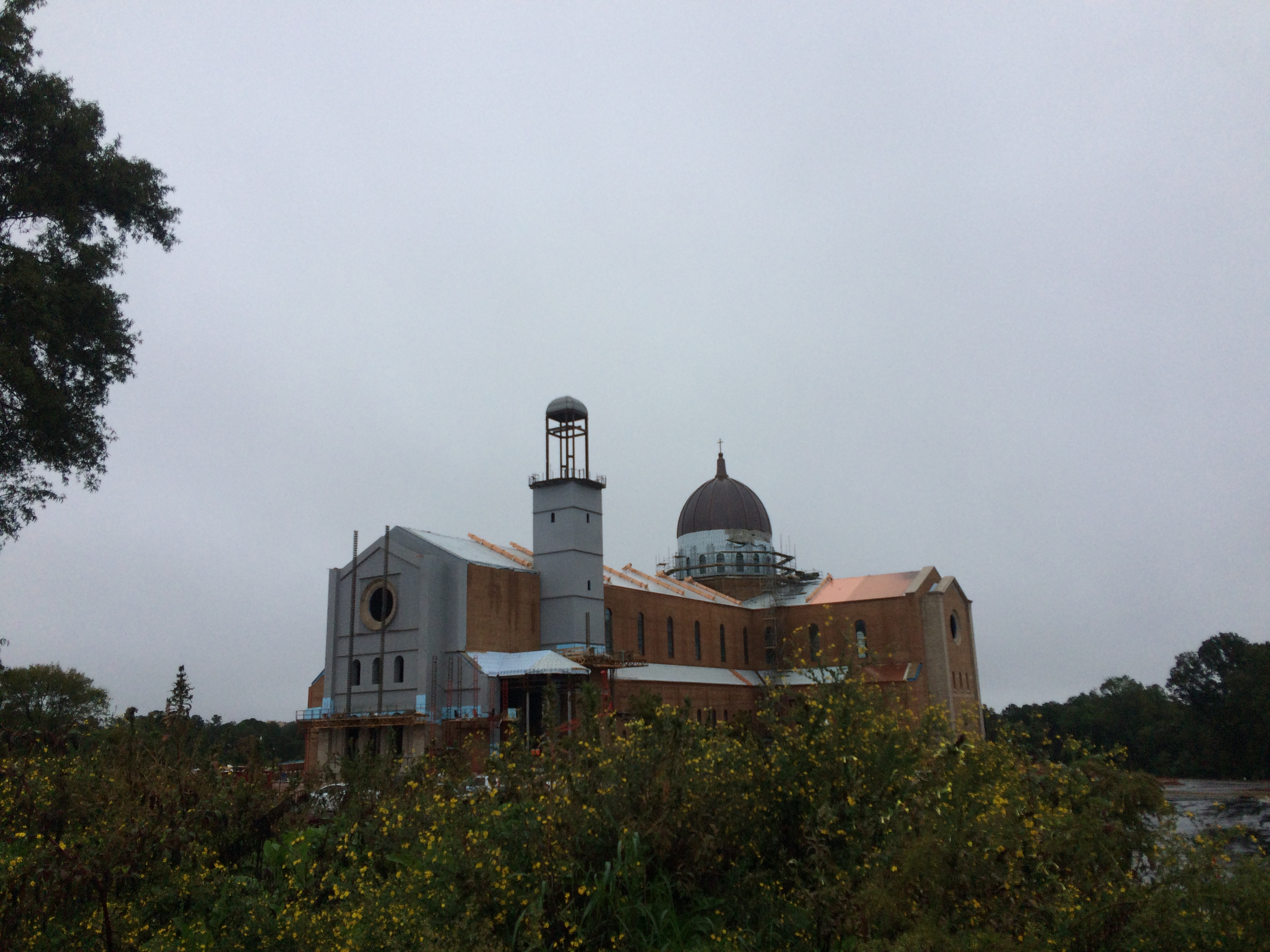
Cathedral under construction (2016)

The cathedral façade is composed predominantly of wood-mold brick, yielding a soft impression to the masonry. The brick was specified in a "rose" color, with a high degree of color range, intended to lend visual interest to the building's exterior. This material and color recalls the region's architectural heritage, as do the grapevine mortar joints. Cast stone, specified in a range of colors, is incorporated into the most prominent parts of the building, such as the west entry façade and the exterior of the chapel. The roof is clad in copper.

=== Nave and transept walls ===
The exterior walls of the nave and transepts feature paired arched windows at the floor level, arranged in a total of 22 bays. Single-arched windows are centered above the paired windows in the clerestory of each bay. The masonry features corbelling. The voussoirs forming the arches are custom-made tapered shapes, in order to allow the joints to remain parallel.

The cathedral obtained twelve stained glass windows that were salvaged from the former Ascension of Our Lord Church in Philadelphia. They were restored by Beyer Studios in Philadelphia, which also designed several new windows. The new windows feature the same border design as the original windows, but include translucent glass fields instead of biblical scenes. The diamond-patterned window fields reference the diamond motif that is repeated throughout the cathedral. This pattern also references the diocesan coat of arms, which incorporates seven diamonds.

=== Bell tower ===
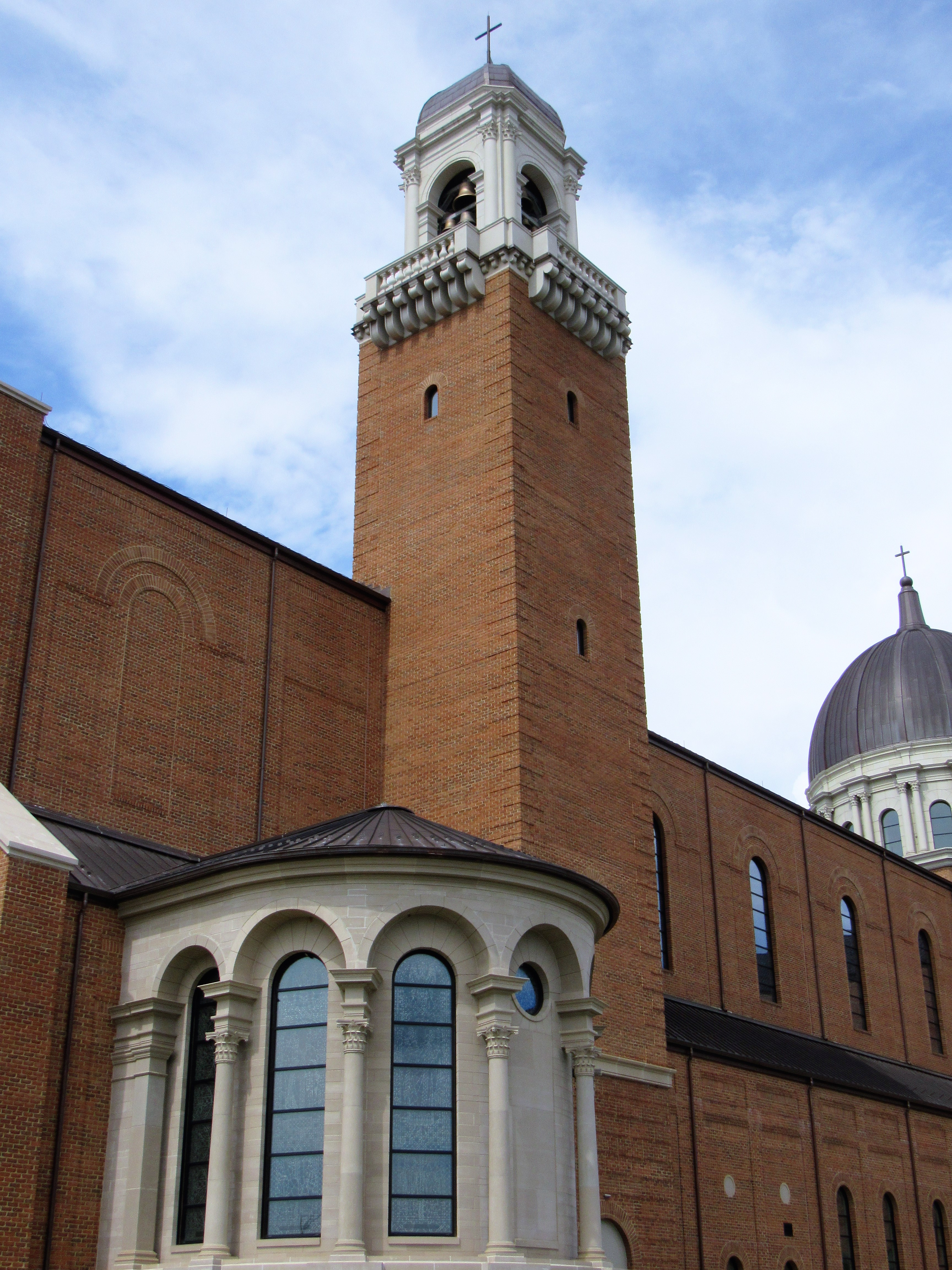
Bell tower (2019)

The cathedral bell tower is 154 feet (47 m) tall, topped with a cross and a decorative flag. The bell tower also includes a decorative balustrade, engaged Corinthian columns and moldings, rustication of the brickwork, and quoins along the tower's corners.

The bell tower contains a 50-bell carillon. The bells range in weight from 18 pounds (8.2 kg) to nearly a ton. Forty-nine of the bells were fabricated by the Verdin Company of Cincinnati, Ohio. One bell was salvaged from the original Holy Name of Jesus Chapel, which previously stood on the property. The bells were blessed by Burbidge in 2016 and installed in 2017. Five of these bells are inscribed with the mottos of five bishops of the diocese. The inscriptions are:

- "Emitte spiritum tuum" (Send forth thy spirit) – Bishop William J. Hafey
- "Omnia omnibus" (All things to all men ) – Bishop Eugene J. McGuinness from 1 Corinthians 9:22
- "Omnia per Mariam" (All through Mary) – Bishop Vincent S. Waters
- "To serve, not be served" – Bishop F. Joseph Gossman
- "Walk humbly with God" – Burbidge

=== Transept ends ===
The brickwork, cast stone piers, parapet, and window surrounds of the transept ends relate visually the entry façade in composition, but are rendered in a simplified design expression, without the Doric or Ionic features visible at the entrance of the building.

=== West (entry) façade ===
The facade for the west entry has Doric columns for its first tier and Ionic columns for the second tier. The entry is made of cast stone, with brickwork above it. It has a round window 12 feet (3.7 m) in diameter, framed with cast stone. Cast stone piers and an entablature frame the entry.

== Cathedral interior ==
=== Chapel of All Saints ===
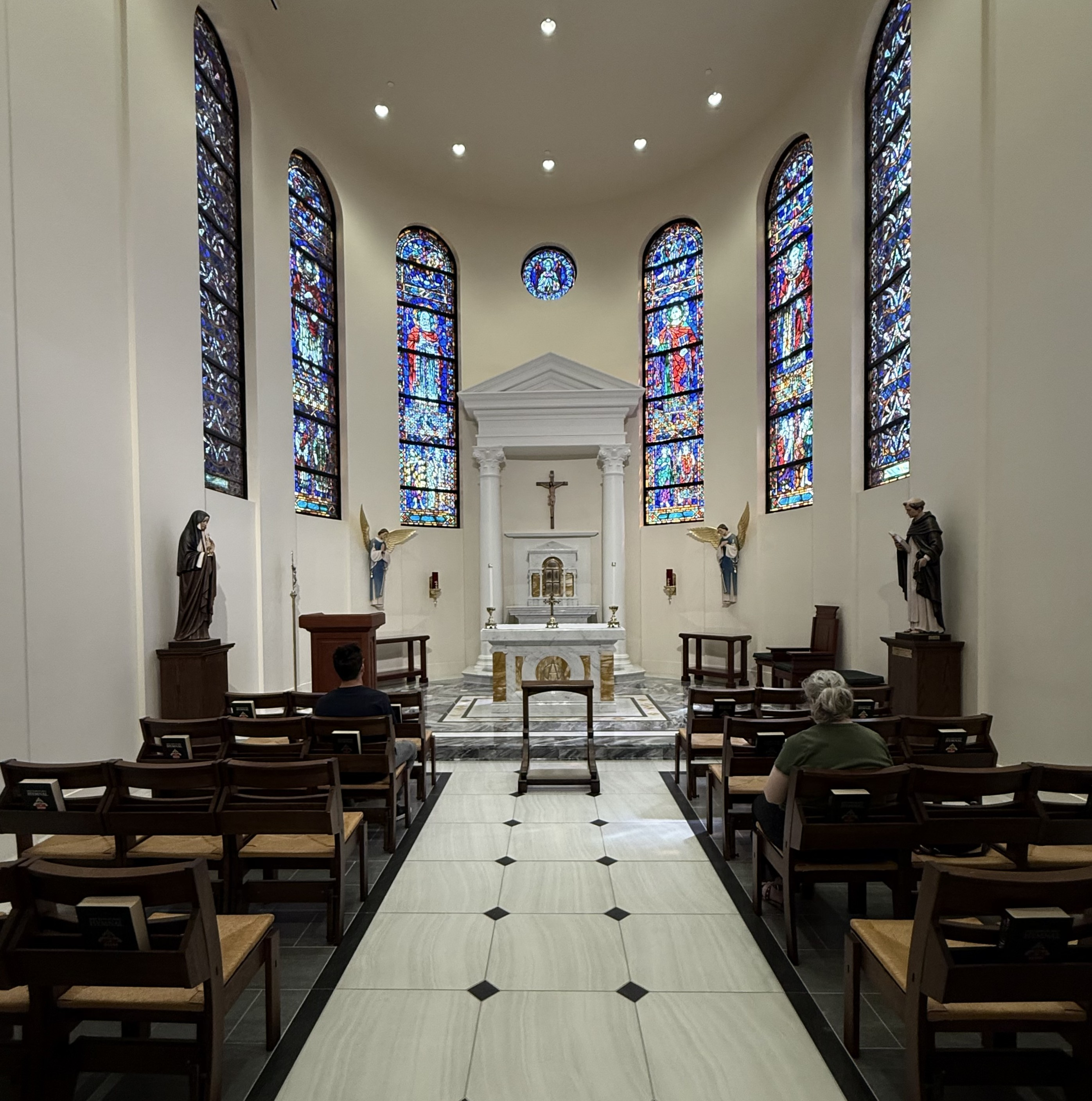
Chapel of All Saints (2025)

The Chapel of All Saints is located inside the cathedral off the narthex. It is designed for worshippers engaged in perpetual adoration of the eucharist and those looking for a quiet place to pray. The chapel seats forty congregants

The chapel contains marble liturgical furnishings that relate to those in the main sanctuary. The tabernacle displays a detached range of Corinthian columns, as seen on the exterior of the actual chapel, as well as a hip roof. The tabernacle and altar are both rendered in Bianco Carrara C marble with Giallo Sienna marble accents. The altar is inscribed with the Alpha and Omega symbol

=== Choir loft and mezzanine ===
The mezzanine, including the choir loft and organ, is approximately 3,500 square feet (330 m^{2}). The choir loft seats approximately 60 people, including seating for 30 instrumental musicians. The loft features risers for the choir as well as a platform for the seated musicians and space for a piano.

The pipe organ (Opus 147) was designed and built by the CB Fisk Company of Gloucester, Massachusetts, and features 61 stops. According to Fisk, "the organ's tonal design, developed with the requirements of the Roman Catholic liturgies in mind, is largely, but not exclusively, influenced by the English Romantic organs." The organ was installed in 2018.

=== Endo narthex and narthex ===
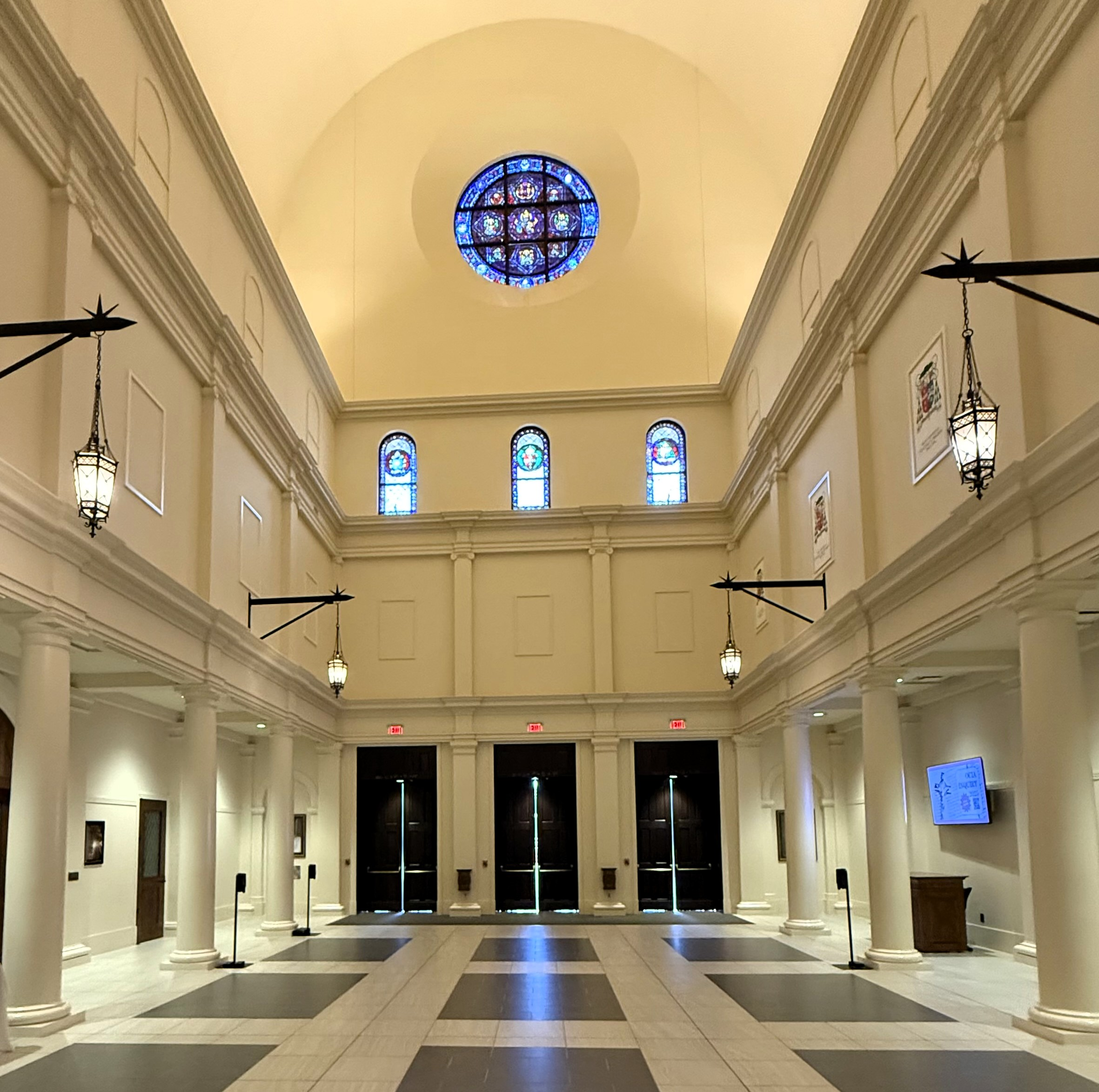
Narthex (2025)

The endo-narthex, located between the narthex and the nave, houses the four stained-oak confessionals. Their design was inspired by confessionals Burbidge saw on a trip to Italy.

The narthex has both Doric and Ionic columns and a barrel vault. This space allow the congregants to gather and greet one another prior to mass. The architect commented that "the design will be similar to other Cathedrals, in that we are building on a 2000-year heritage of sacred architecture. At the same time, the Cathedral is intended to be a reflection of the values of the faithful of North Carolina, and so it is bound to be unique in that way."

=== Nave and transepts ===
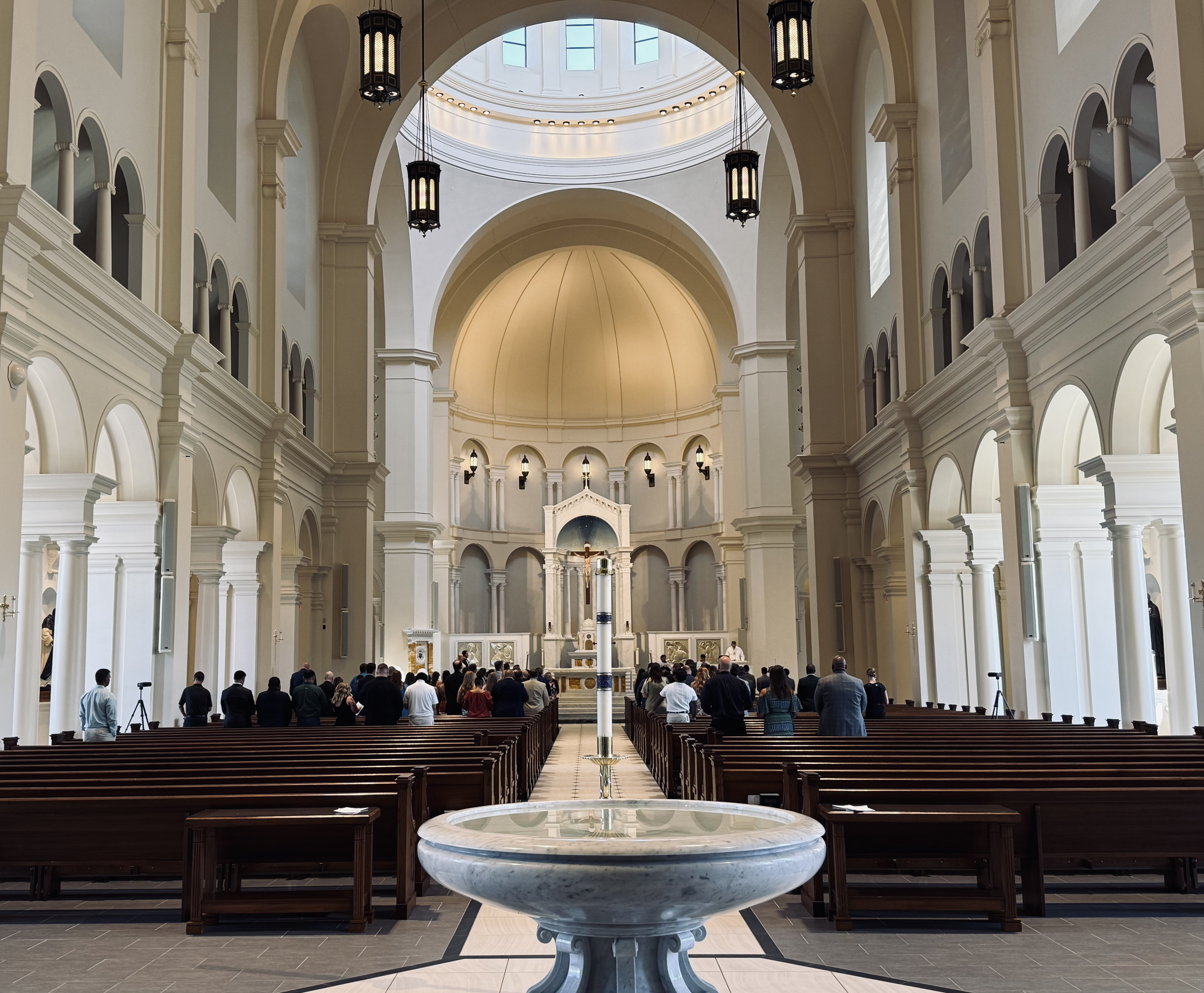
Nave (2025)

The nave and transepts contain both Ionic and Doric columns on the arcade and triforium. Colossal piers superimposed over these two tiers support the ribs of the barrel vault. The apex of the barrel vault reaches 77 feet (23 m).

Each transept seats 500 worshippers and the nave seats 1,000 worshippers. The cathedral layout placed the pews close to the altar. The two ends of the transepts house the Our Lady of the Immaculate Conception and St. Joseph the Worker shrine. Each shrine features a carved statue.

In the nave, the side aisles contain 24 statues of saints mounted in niches. One empty niche is reserved for Reverend Thomas Frederick Price, a Servant of God as of 2026. The 14 stations of the cross in the nave and transept aisles are made of restored, painted wood.

The baptismal font is located at the western end of the nave. The font basin is 6 feet (1.8 m) in diameter and is constructed of solid Bianco Carrara C marble. The baptismal font stands atop an octagonal marble flooring made of Bardiglio Nuvolato marble. It is arranged so that the natural veins of the marble appear to radiate from the font, representing the flow of water.

=== Sanctuary ===
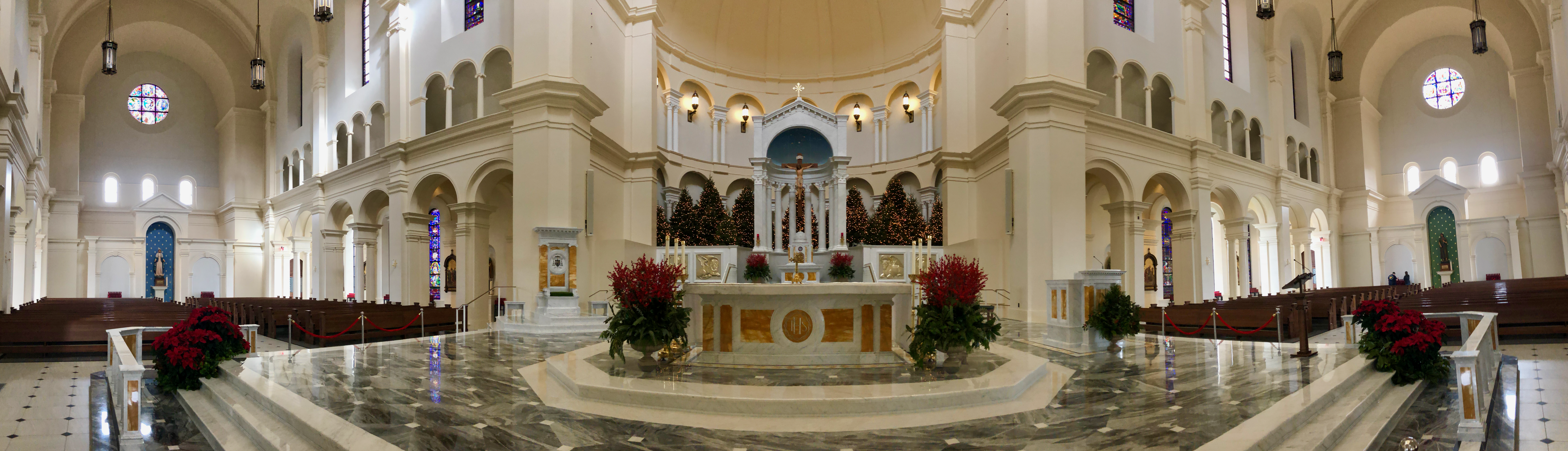

The sanctuary, located under the dome, contains the altar of sacrifice, ambo, and cathedra. All of them are rendered in Bianco Carrara C marble, with Giallo Siena marble accents on the pilasters and panels. The altar, ambo, and cathedra are surrounded by borders of Bianco Carrara C marble with Giallo Siena diamond accents. The sanctuary flooring features Bardiglio Nuvolato marble slabs with diamond accents of Bianco Carrara C.

The tabernacle is located on an elevated platform within the eastern apse. The apse design was inspired by a passage from the Book of Revelations in the New Testament that mentions 24 elders in white robes with golden crowns, and seven lamps. The tabernacle was constructed entirely in marble. It features a lapis lazuli and mother-of-pearl roundel and a gold door.

== See also ==
- List of Catholic cathedrals in the United States
- List of cathedrals in the United States
