= Luis R. Zarama =

Roman Catholic prelate

His Excellency, The Most Reverend Luis Rafael Zarama Pasqualetto
- Bishop of Raleigh
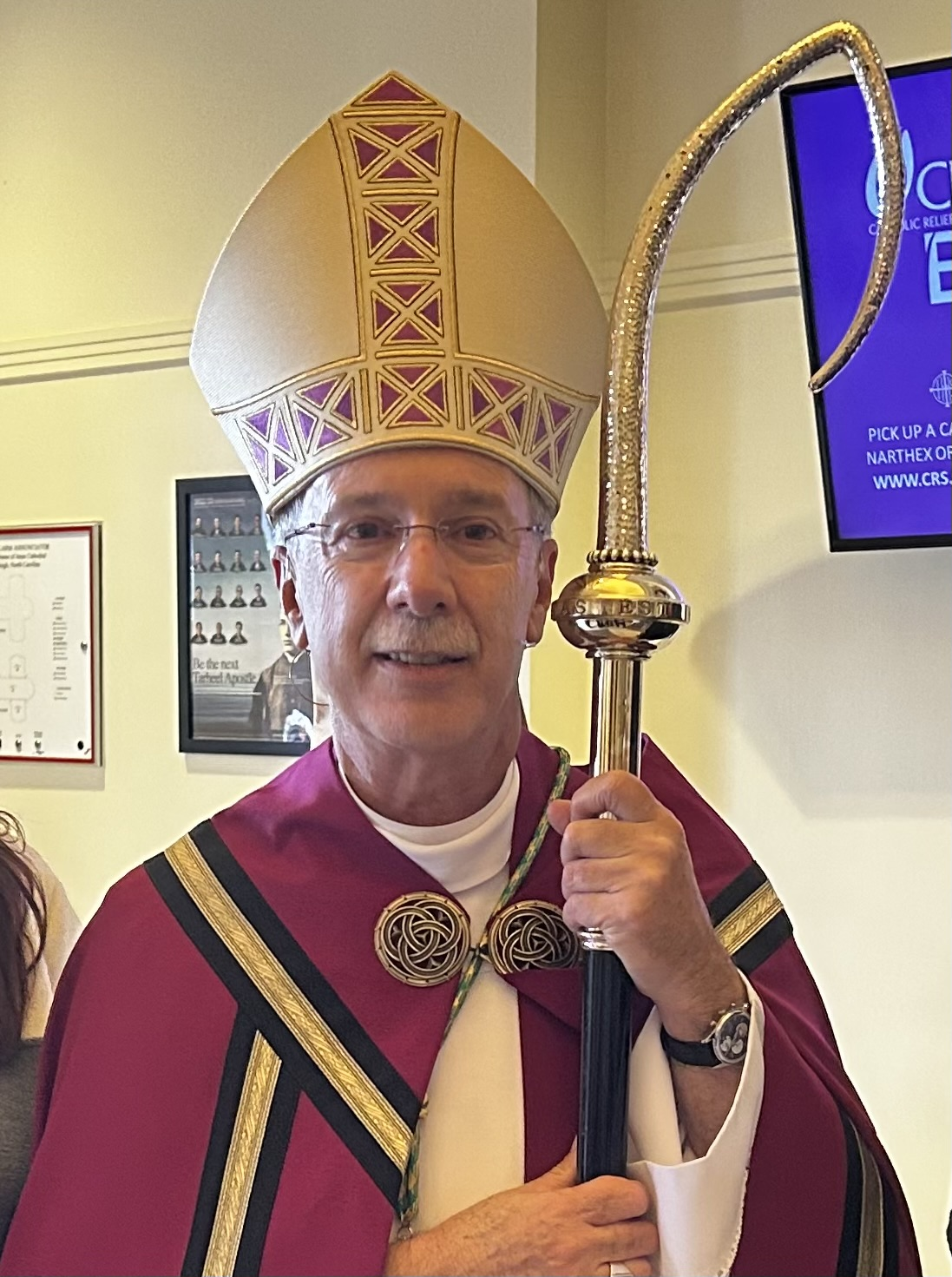
- Bishop Zarama in 2023
- Diocese: Raleigh
- Appointed: July 5, 2017
- Installed: August 29, 2017
- Predecessor: Michael Francis Burbidge
- Previous post: Auxiliary Bishop of Atlanta and Titular Bishop of Bararus (2009-2017)

Orders
- Ordination: November 27, 1993 by John Francis Donoghue
- Consecration: July 27, 2009 by Wilton Daniel Gregory, Eusebius J. Beltran, and John Francis Donoghue

Personal details
- Born: November 28, 1958 (age 67) Pasto, Colombia
- Denomination: Roman Catholic Church
- Residence: Raleigh, North Carolina
- Education: Seminary of Pasto; Universidad Mariana; Pontificia Universidad Javeriana
- Motto: Deus caritas est (God is love)

Styles of Luis Rafael Zarama
- Reference style: His Excellency; The Most Reverend
- Spoken style: Your Excellency
- Religious style: Bishop

Luis Rafael Zarama Pasqualetto (born November 28, 1958) is a Colombian-born American prelate of the Roman Catholic Church who has served as bishop of Raleigh in North Carolina since 2017. He previously served as an auxiliary bishop for the Archdiocese of Atlanta in Georgia from 2009 to 2017. Zarama is the first Hispanic bishop of Raleigh and the first foreign-born bishop. He is also the first Colombian bishop to lead an American diocese.

== Biography ==
=== Early life ===
Luis Zarama was born on November 28, 1958, in Pasto, Nariño, Colombia, the oldest of the six children of Rafael Zarama and Maria Pasqualetto de Zarama. Deciding to become a priest, Luis Zarama entered the seminary of Pasto in 1982. While at the seminary, Zarama taught at local high schools in Pasto. He also studied philosophy and theology at the Universidad Mariana in Pasto.

Zarama went to Bogotá in 1987 to study canon law at the Pontificia Universidad Javeriana. After earning his licentiate, he emigrated to the United States in 1989.

=== Priesthood ===
Zarama was ordained into the priesthood by Archbishop John Francis Donoghue for the Archdiocese of Atlanta at the Cathedral of Christ the King in Atlanta on November 27, 1993. After his ordination, the archdiocese assigned Zarama as parochial vicar at Sacred Heart Parish in Atlanta. At the same time, he was appointed as an advocate for the Ecclesiastical Province of Atlanta court of appeals, holding that post until 1997.

In 1996, the archdiocese appointed Zarama as administrator of St. Helena Mission in Clayton, Georgia, and pastor of St. Mark Parish in Clarkesville, Georgia. He later said that the mountains of Northern Georgia reminded him of Colombia and that his time there was a great learning experience. The next year, he also assumed the position of defender of the bond for the archdiocese. Zarama became an American citizen on July 4, 2000. He remarked: "I'm happy here, I choose to be here, and I feel like I'm part of the system as a citizen."

Donoghue named Zarama as assistant director of the Vocations Office in 2000. In 2006, Archbishop Wilton Daniel Gregory named him as vicar general. In 2007, the Vatican raised Zarama to the rank of chaplain of his holiness. In addition to his duties as vicar general, Wilton named Zarama as judicial vicar in 2008 and designated him as the archbishop's delegate to North Georgia's Hispanic community.

While in Atlanta, Zarama was also a member of the Committee for Continuing Education of Priests and the priest personnel board.

=== Auxiliary Bishop of Atlanta ===
Coat of arms as auxiliary bishop of Atlanta

On July 27, 2009, Zarama was appointed auxiliary bishop of Atlanta and titular bishop of Bararus by Pope Benedict XVI. He received his episcopal consecration on September 29, 2009, with Gregory as the principal consecrator and Donoghue and Archbishop Eusebius Beltran as co-consecrators, at the Cathedral of Christ the King.

While serving as auxiliary bishop, Zarama remained vicar general and judicial vicar for the archdiocese. Zarama presided over the Sunday mass and delivered the homily at the Steubenville Atlanta Youth Conference in 2016.

=== Bishop of Raleigh ===
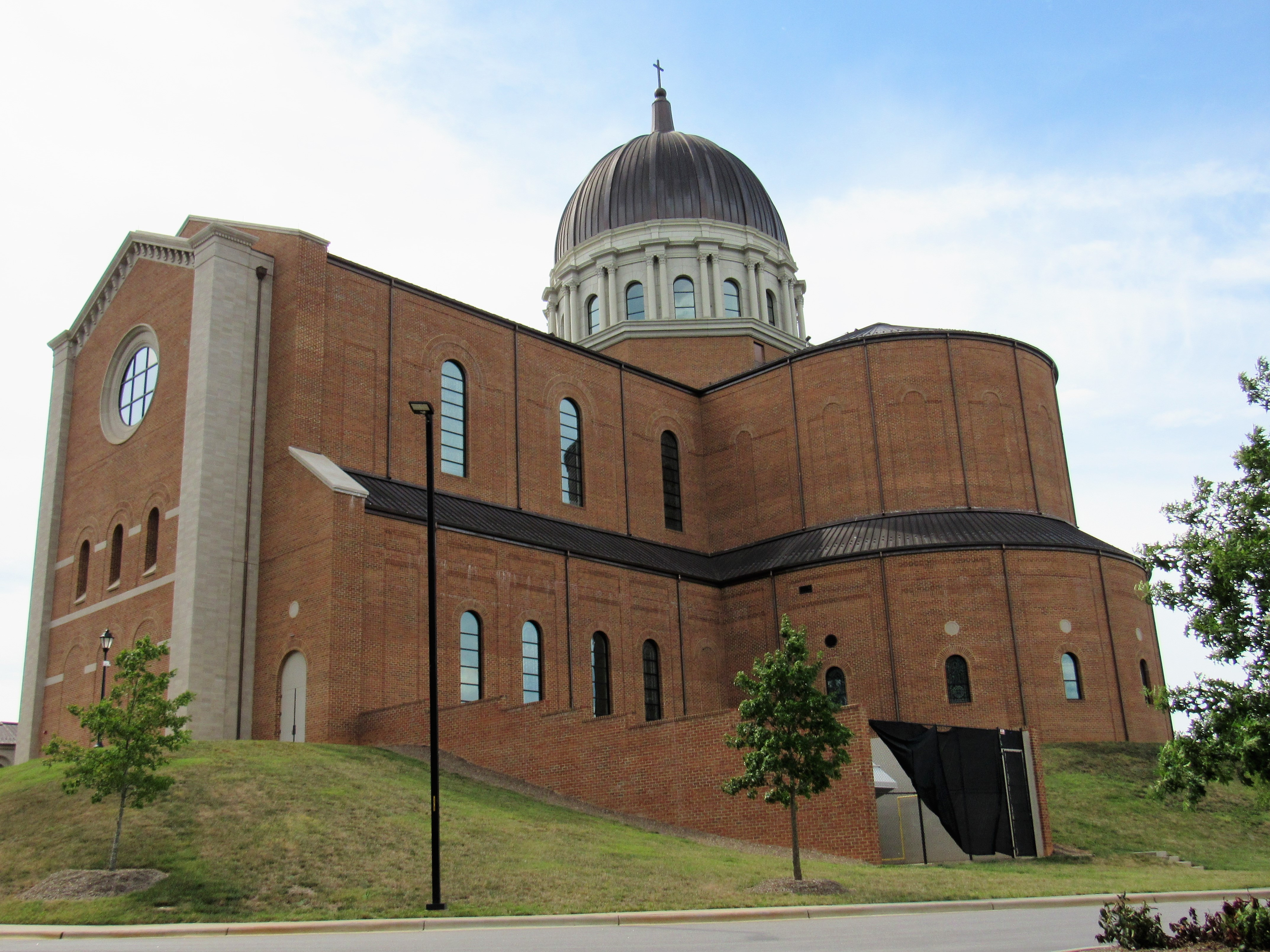
Holy Name of Jesus Cathedral, Raleigh, North Carolina (2019)

On July 5, 2017, Pope Francis appointed Zarama as bishop of Raleigh. He was installed on August 29, 2017, at Holy Name of Jesus Cathedral in Raleigh. He became the first Hispanic and non-native bishop of Raleigh and the first Colombian-born bishop to lead a Catholic diocese in the United States.

In August 2018, after the resignation of Cardinal Theodore McCarrick for the sexual abuse of minors, Zarama stated that he would pray for the renewal of church leadership and the courage to take the necessary steps to end clerical sexual abuse.

After the release in August 2018 of the Pennsylvania grand jury report on sexual abuse of minors in that state, Zarama called the revelations "sad" and "shameful". He voiced his support for the United States Conference of Catholic Bishops' goals to investigate, report, and resolve recent accounts of sexual abuse and for the Catholic Church to do so with higher level involvement of the laity. He asked for Catholics to continue to pray for all victims of abuse, stating that they are the Church's priority.

On March 12, 2020, Zarama waived the obligation to attend Sunday mass during the COVID-19 pandemic. On March 14, 2020, Zarama cancelled all weekend masses until further notice and directed all Catholic schools in the diocese to comply with North Carolina Governor Roy Cooper's executive order to close all schools in North Carolina for a minimum of two weeks. On March 16, Zarama officially suspended all masses.

In October 2021, Zarama responded to the apostolic letter Traditionis custodes, regarding continued use of the Tridentine Mass (or Latin mass), that was issued by Francis. Zarama reduced the number of Latin masses being celebrated and allowed them only on Sunday afternoons He also allowed one Latin mass one evening per week. Zarama continued to allow additional Latin masses at Holy Name of Jesus Cathedral and the Basilica Shrine of St. Mary.

Zarama also stipulated that the parishes could continue using Epistle and Gospel Bible readings in Latin, but the English translations must come from the Ordo Lectionum Missae or the 2011 edition of the New American Bible. Zarama decreed that "only priests who have received faculties" from him could celebrate the Latin mass. His ruling went into effect on January 1, 2022.In 2022, Zarama addressed the Archdiocese of Atlanta Eucharistic Congress.

== Viewpoints ==
=== Immigration ===
On September 5, 2017, Zarama issued a statement in response to U.S. President Donald Trump's decision to end Deferred Action for Childhood Arrivals (DACA), calling for comprehensive immigration reform.

=== Gun violence ===
On June 28, 2023, Zarama and the other seven bishops of the province of Atlanta issued a statement calling for gun control legislation.

=== LGBTQ rights ===
On February 8, 2019, Zarama released a statement supporting Reverend Christopher Van Height of Immaculate Conception Catholic Church in Durham. Van Height had banned Durham City Councilors Vernetta Alston and Jillian Johnson from speaking at a Black History Month event at Immaculata Catholic School because they were lesbians who openly supported same-sex marriage.

== Coat of arms ==
Zarama's coat of arms contains a blue field with an extra wide chevron of gold (yellow). This device gives the illusion of two mountains; a gold one and a blue one. The gold mountain (the chevron) is charged with a scattering (semé) of red crosses to represent Pasto in Colombia." The lower mountain (part of the blue field) has a golden lion's head to represent Mark the Evangelist, the titular patron of the parish in Clarkesville, Georgia, on a mountain, where Zarama served as pastor. Above the chevron are a gold rose for Thérèse of the Child Jesus, also known as "The Little Flower," and a silver (white) lily for Saint Joseph, who is Zarama's patron saint. Zarama selected as his episcopal motto the Latin phrase Deus Caritas Est (God is love), the title of an encyclical by Pope Benedict XVI.

The achievement is completed with the external ornaments which are a gold episcopal processional cross, that is placed in back of and which extends above and below the shield, and the galero hat, with its six tassels, in three rows, on either side of the shield, all in green. These are the heraldic insignia of a bishop.

== See also ==
- Catholic Church hierarchy
- Catholic Church in the United States
- Historical list of the Catholic bishops of the United States
- List of Catholic bishops of the United States
- Lists of patriarchs, archbishops, and bishops

Catholic Church titles
Preceded by Michael Francis Burbidge	Bishop of Raleigh; 2017–present	Succeeded by Incumbent
Preceded by –	Auxiliary Bishop of Atlanta; 2009–2017	Succeeded by -
