= Christ the King Chapel (Christendom College) =

Catholic chapel at Christendom College, Virginia, US

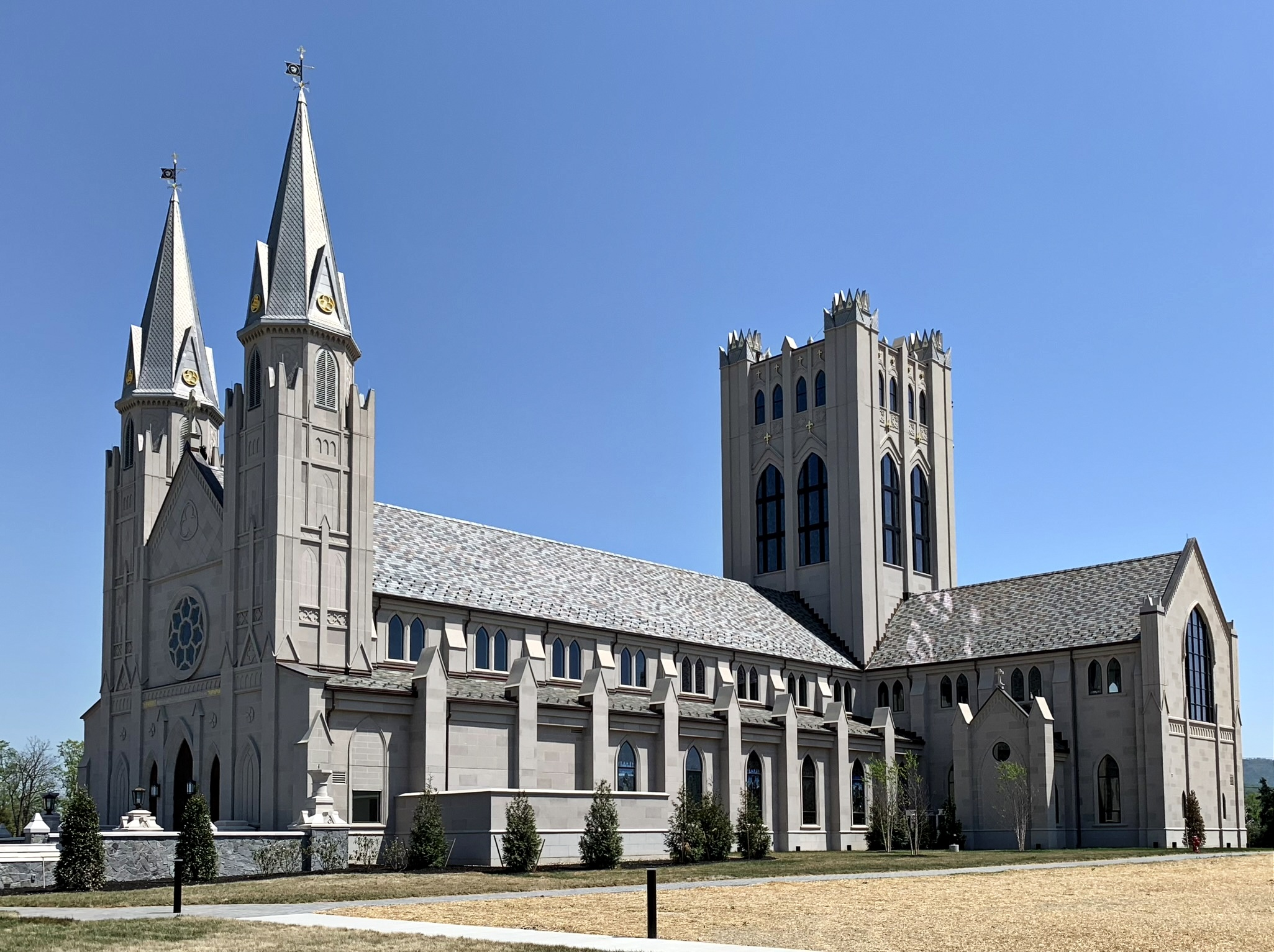
- Christ the King Chapel in 2023
- Christ the King Chapel
- 38.947433°N 78.147359°W
- Location: 134 Christendom Drive Front Royal, Virginia
- Country: United States
- Denomination: Catholic Church
- Sui iuris church: Latin Church
- Tradition: Roman Rite
- Website: chapel.christendom.edu

History
- Dedication: April 15, 2023; 3 years ago

Architecture
- Architect(s): O'Brien & Keane
- Architectural type: Gothic Revival
- Groundbreaking: September 2018
- Completed: 2023
- Construction cost: $30 million

Administration
- Diocese: Arlington

Clergy
- Bishop: Michael F. Burbidge

Christ the King Chapel is a Catholic chapel located on the campus of Christendom College in Front Royal, Virginia, United States. The $30 million chapel replaced the college's former church building, also named Christ the King Chapel, that was used from 1995 until the new chapel was completed. After a two-year fundraising campaign that began in 2016, groundbreaking took place in 2018 and the dedication was held on April 15, 2023. Those in attendance for the dedication and Mass included Michael F. Burbidge, bishop of the Diocese of Arlington, and Cardinal Francis Arinze.

The Gothic Revival chapel, designed by O'Brien & Keane and easily visible to people traveling on nearby Interstate 66, is in the shape of a cross. It features a 114-foot (34.7 m) tall crossing tower, two bell towers, and a piazza. A cornerstone blessed by Pope Benedict XVI is in the building's façade. There are over 100 stained-glass windows in the building. Interior details include a Lady Chapel, a pipe organ featuring 2,825 pipes, four shrines, and ten statues. A golden oculus in the crossing tower is surrounded by painted figures.

== History ==
=== Planning ===
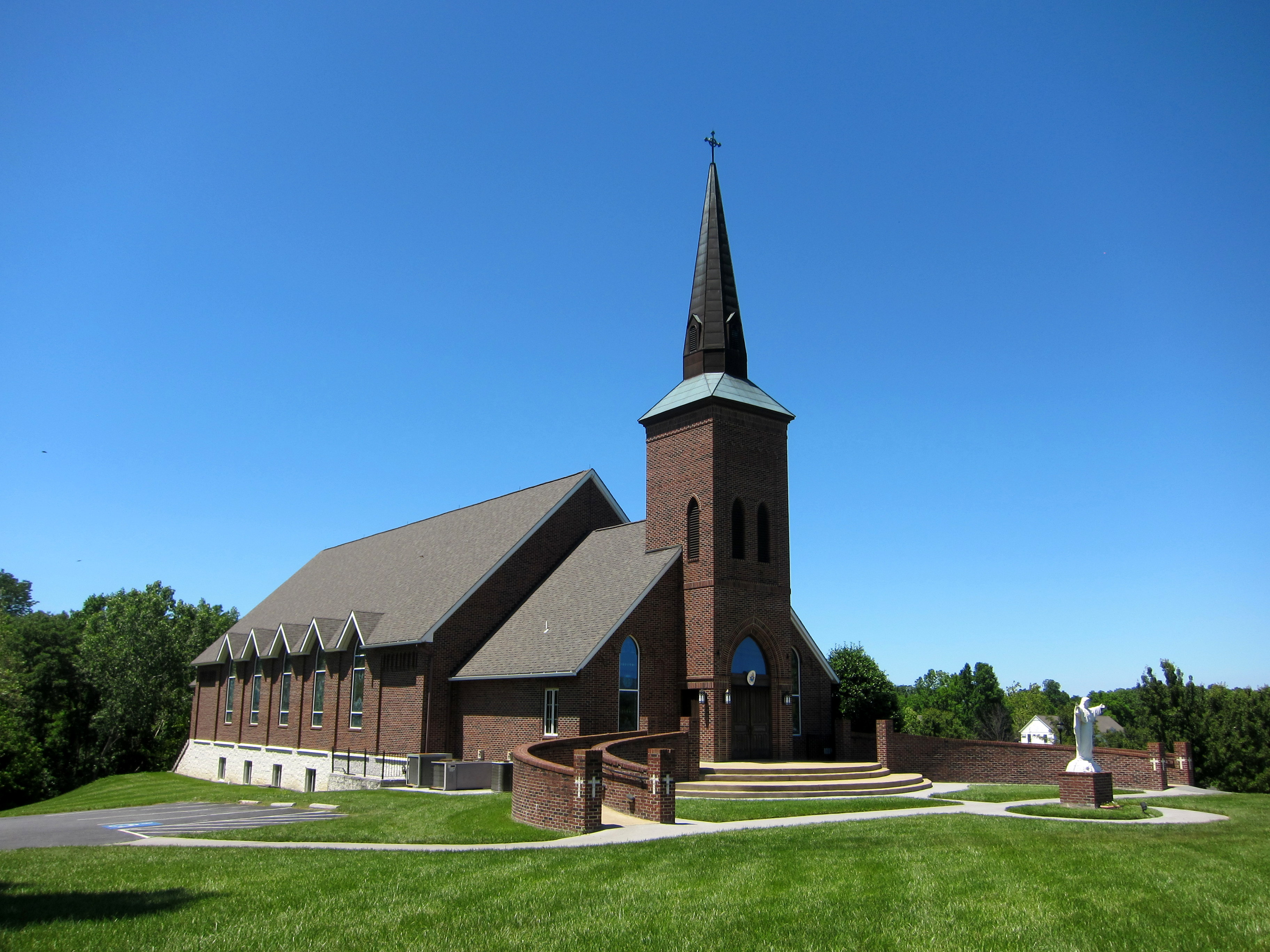
Christendom's former chapel

Christendom College in Front Royal, Virginia, is a Catholic liberal arts college founded in 1977. The college's first chapel was a repurposed building constructed in the 1940s and later expanded in 1988. A new building, also named Christ the King Chapel, opened in 1995 and was consecrated by Cardinal Jan Pieter Schotte. Due to increased enrollment in the 21st century, the college outgrew the chapel and plans were made to build a larger structure.

College officials chose to build a much larger, Gothic Revival chapel on the highest point of the campus, visible to people traveling on nearby Interstate 66. In 2008, the cornerstone was brought to Vatican City, where it was blessed by Pope Benedict XVI. He was also shown the new chapel's building plans and remarked "It is beautiful." According to Timothy T. O'Donnell, president of Christendom College, Gothic-styled architecture was chosen for the new chapel to "epitomize the name Christendom" and evoke the Middle Ages.

In 2016, the college began a fundraising campaign named "A Call to Greatness." The goal was to raise $40 million by 2018 when Christendom would celebrate its 40th anniversary. The campaign was to build the new chapel, double the college's endowment, and to increase the funds available for student aid. Within two years the campaign had raised $45 million.

=== Construction ===
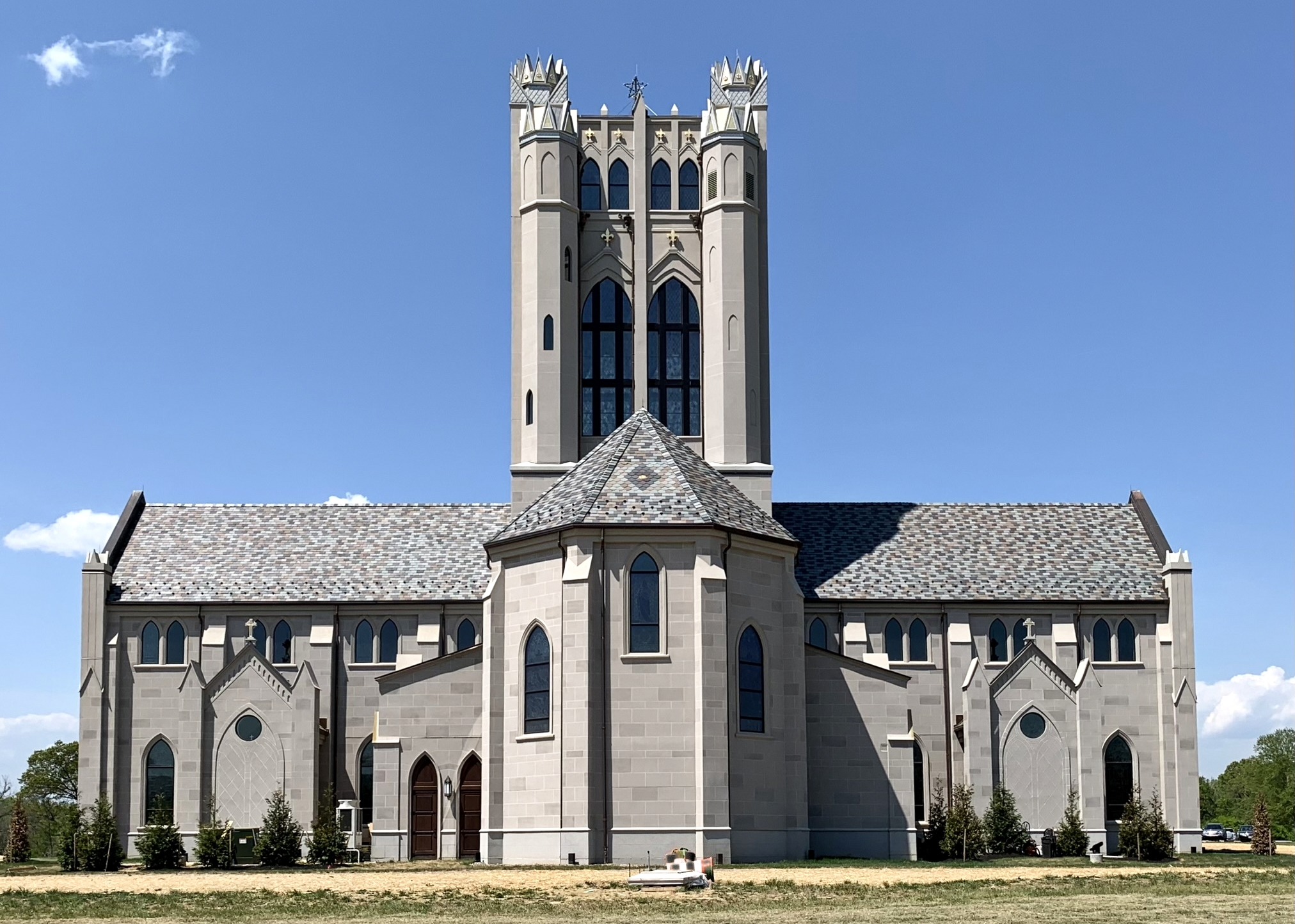
Rear view of the chapel

A groundbreaking ceremony took place in September 2018 shortly after Michael F. Burbidge, bishop of the Diocese of Arlington, blessed the construction site. Hoar Construction was chosen as the general contractor and, following initial site work and gathering necessary permits, work began on the chapel's construction in the summer of 2019. O'Brien & Keane was the architectural firm chosen to design the chapel. The building's stained-glass windows were designed and restored by the Beyer Studio.

In January 2020, a topping-out ceremony took place at the construction site. College officials, along with students and alumni, gathered to sign the last beam that was later installed. The McShane Bell Company made the chapel's twelve bronze bells that were "baptized" in November 2020 during the Feast of Christ the King. Construction continued during the COVID-19 pandemic and the chapel's two steeples were added in late 2021. Beginning in January 2023, the handcrafted pipe organ was installed. The instrument, which has 2,825 pipes and took 14 months to construct, was made by Kegg Pipe Organ Builders. After it was built, the organ was disassembled and delivered from Ohio to the chapel via tractor trailers.

Alumni, staff, and students assisted with the construction process. Examples include Sharon Hickson, a professor at Christendom, who assisted with decorating the chapel's interior. Corey Morgan, a graduate of Christendom, detailed wood for the chapel's interior. A large portion of the wood Morgan used came from trees on the college campus. Another alumna, Mandy Hain, worked with other artists to paint portions of the chapel, including the tower's ceiling and the Sanctus located above the sanctuary. Hain died before the chapel was dedicated and the college plans to install a memorial plaque in the future.

A few months before Benedict XVI's death in December 2022, he wrote a letter to Christendom's president:

Dear Doctor O'Donnell,

You kindly informed me about the consecration of the new Chapel at Christendom College, which will take place on April 15, 2023.

As I had the privilege to bless the cornerstone for the new Chapel, it fills me with joy that this beautiful Church is now almost completed and will be consecrated and dedicated to Christ the King in the coming year. It is my wish, and my prayer, that this Chapel may be a visible expression that the truth and love of Christ continue to animate, to guide, and to distinguish the activities of Christendom College.

Invoking God's abundant blessings upon you, the professors, students, and staff of Christendom College, I am fraternally yours in Christ.

Benedictus XVI

=== Dedication and usage ===
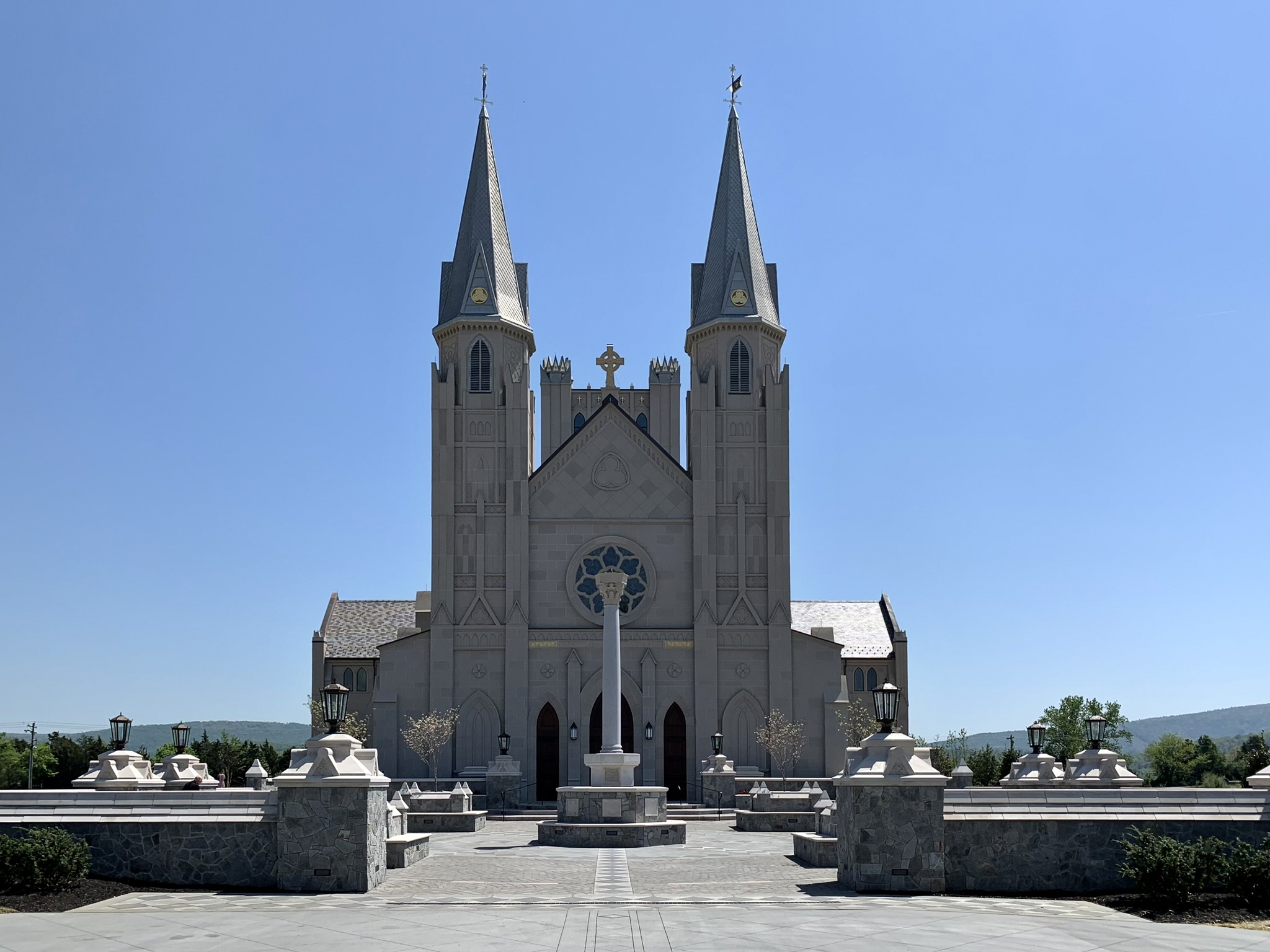
Dedication attendees gathered at the piazza in front of the chapel.

On April 13, 2023, a ribbon-cutting ceremony took place for the new $30 million chapel, which began a weekend of planned events for the building's dedication. The dedication on April 15 was attended by approximately 700 people, including college officials, alumni, and donors. Bishop Burbidge and Cardinal Francis Arinze were among those in attendance. Twenty-five of the alumni in attendance are ordained priests. EWTN, a Catholic-interest television network, aired the event live.

Prior to the dedication and Mass, religious officials gathered at the old Christ the King Chapel, which college officials plan to convert into additional class space and a Catholic cultural center. The officials proceeded to the piazza where they joined the rest of the attendees. During the event, the choir and the rest of those in attendance recited the Litany of the Saints and sang hymns. A relic of Thomas Aquinas was deposited into the altar by Burbridge. He later blessed the altar and, along with Christendom chaplain Father Marcus Pollard and Deacon Andrew W. Clark of nearby St. John the Baptist Church, anointed the chapel's walls with incense. Communion took place before the final blessing and conclusion of the event.

Members of the public are able to visit the chapel. The college plans to hold graduation ceremonies in the chapel, along with religious events, and the building will be available for weddings. Special events will also take place on the piazza.

== Design ==
=== Exterior ===
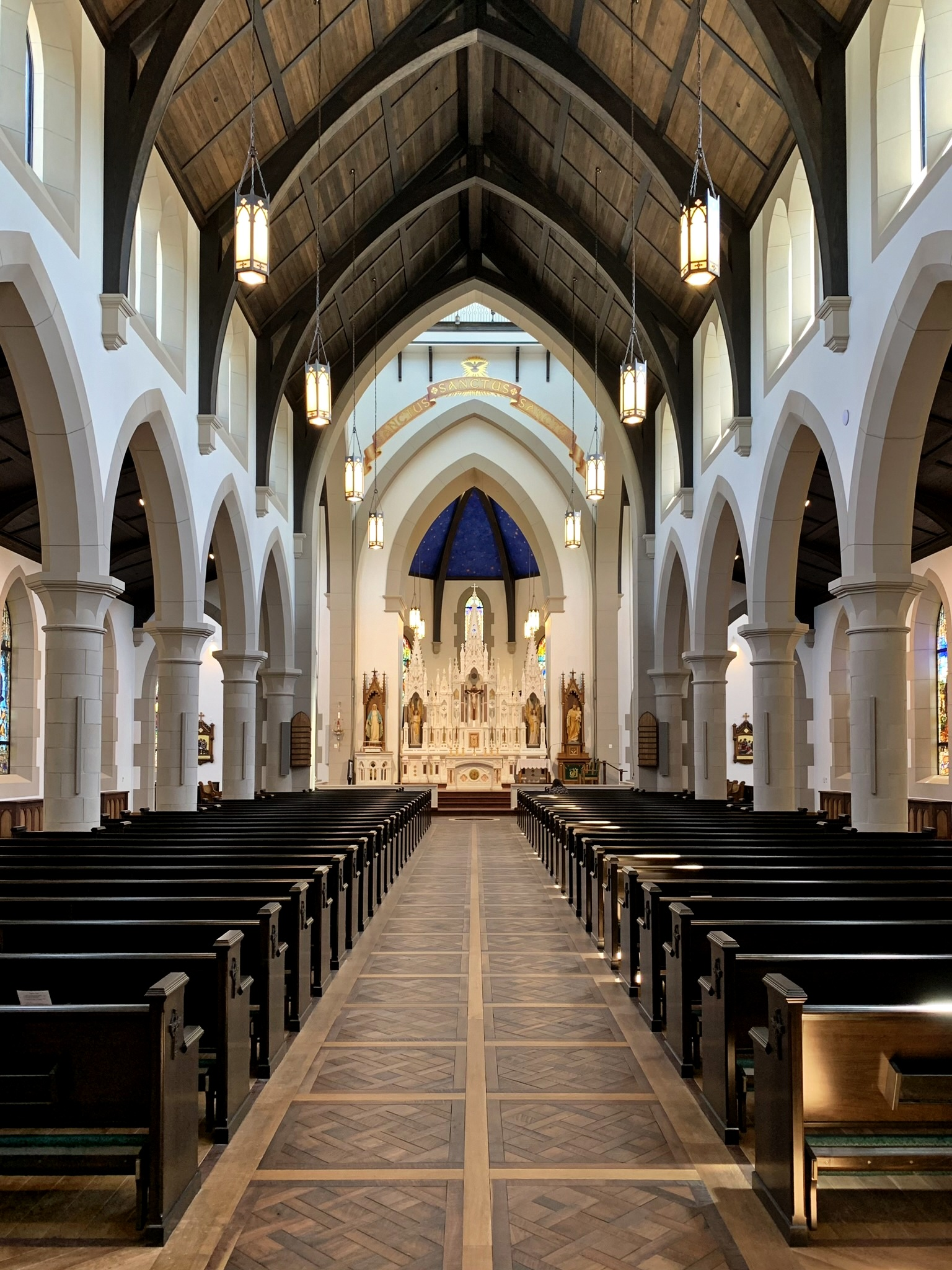
Facing towards the altar

The Gothic Revival chapel is 24,000 square feet (2,230 sq m) and seats 750 people. The building is in the shape of the Christian cross. The chapel's crossing tower is 114 feet (34.7 m) tall and the two bell towers at the entrance measure 35 feet (10.7 m). The twelve bells inside the towers are each named after one of the Twelve Apostles. The doors are made of mahogany and red oak. The piazza, which is planned to include statues and fountains, is in front of the chapel. The cornerstone blessed by Benedict XVI, which features his coat of arms and shield, is located in the façade.

=== Interior ===
According to architect James O'Brien, whose company designed the chapel, the building's two prominent features are the interior's height, which is meant to uplift people, and the stained-glass windows. Inside the sanctuary are twelve columns representing the Twelve Apostles.

There are 114 stained-glass windows in the chapel depicting saints and Biblical events. Some of the windows were repurposed from the old Christ the King Chapel. The rose window on the façade features seven exterior sections, each depicting an angel that holds an image representing liberal arts (rhetoric, grammar, logic, astronomy, mathematics, geometry, and music). The center portion of the rose window depicts Mary, mother of Jesus. The stained-glass windows in the nave depict Saint Peter and Saint Paul.

The pipe organ is located in the upstairs balcony. The High Altar, Altar of Sacrifice, altar rail, and the four shrines located on either side of the chapel, were installed by Rugo Stone. The four shrines depict the crucifix, the Sacred Heart, Our Lady of Fátima, and the last features the Divine Mercy image and images of Saint Faustina and Pope John Paul II. Plans for the Crucifix Shrine include stained-glass windows depicting Our Lady of Sorrows, the eclipse on Good Friday, and John the Apostle. There are ten statues in the chapel by artist Edwin Gonzalez, including ones that depict Pietà, Saint Anthony of Padua, and Saint Joseph.

On the east side of the building is the Lady Chapel, which is dedicated to Mary. The stained-glass windows inside this chapel depict Mary's Annunciation, Visitation, Assumption, and Coronation. There is also a painting of Mary and Joseph's wedding and a carpet from the House of the Virgin Mary, a Catholic shrine near Ephesus, Turkey.

The ceiling of the crossing tower, located above the chancel, features a golden oculus representing the Eucharist surrounded by painted angels. The rest of the ceiling is painted deep blue with stars to depict the sky. On each corner of the ceiling is a painted archangel. The painted Sanctus lettering and dove representing the Holy Spirit are also above the chancel. In 2024, the college installed a 5-foot (1.5 m) thurible (known as a botafumeiro), modeled after the one found at Santiago de Compostela Cathedral.

== Gallery of interior details ==
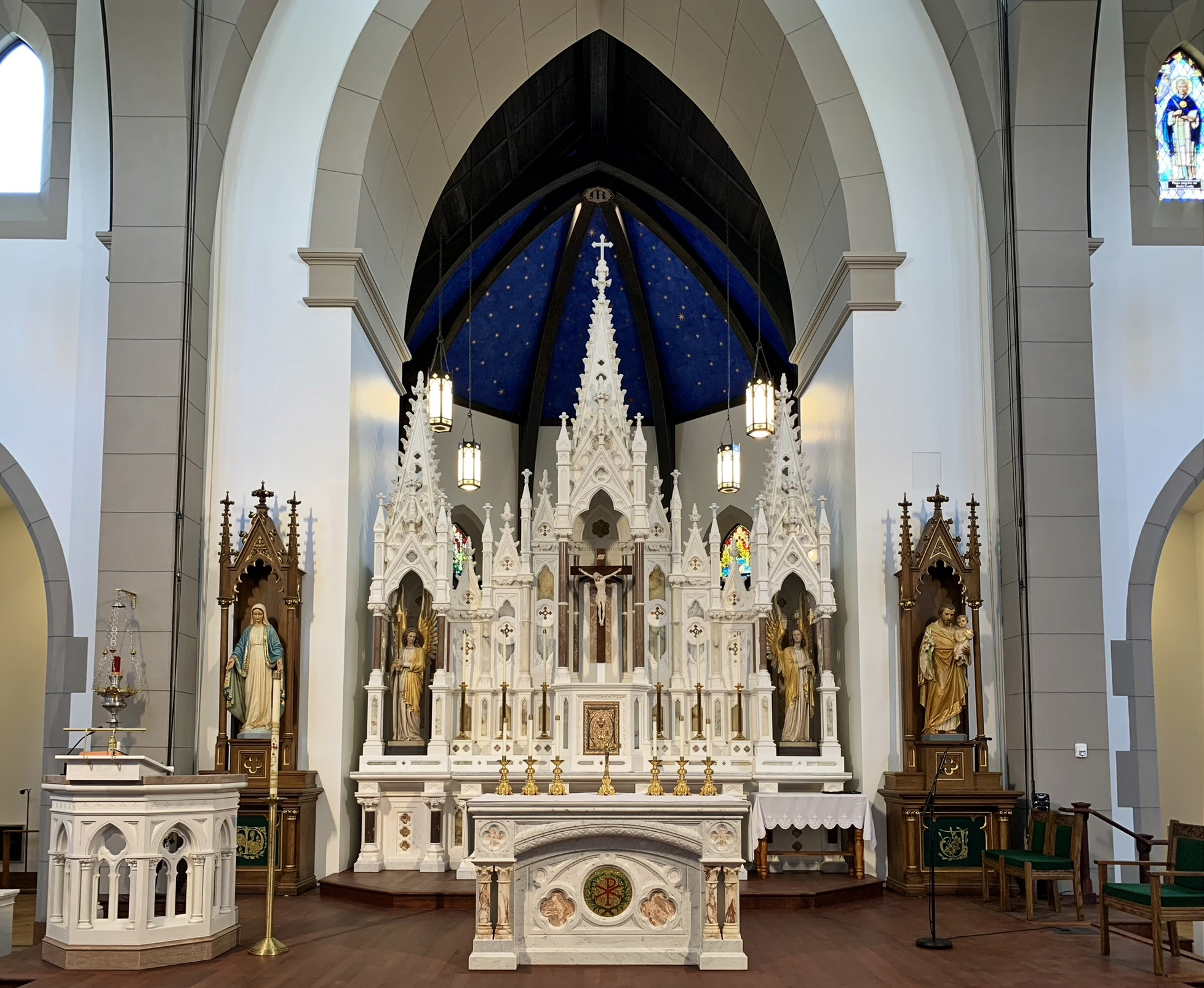
Chapel's altar

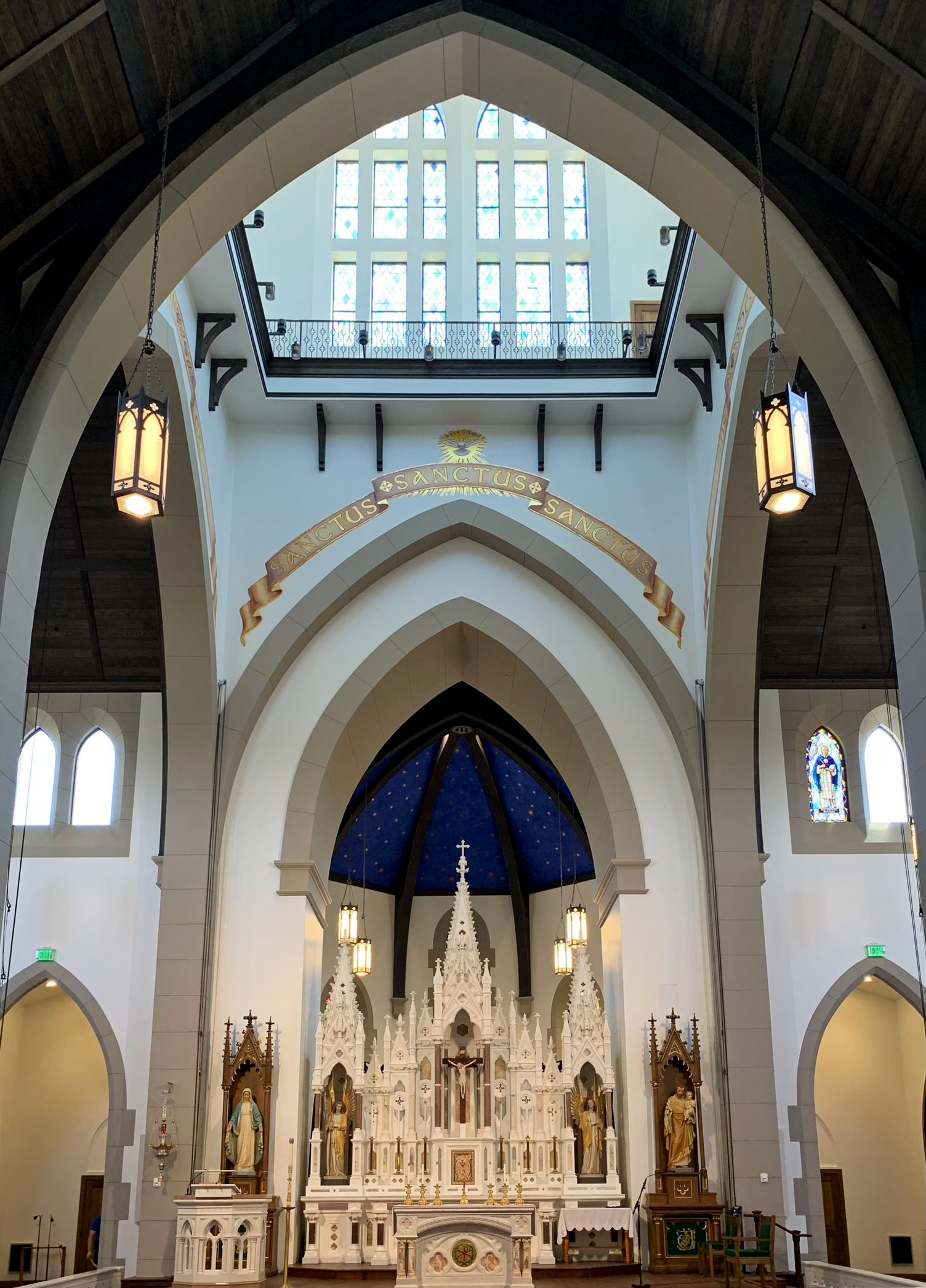
Altar and crossing tower

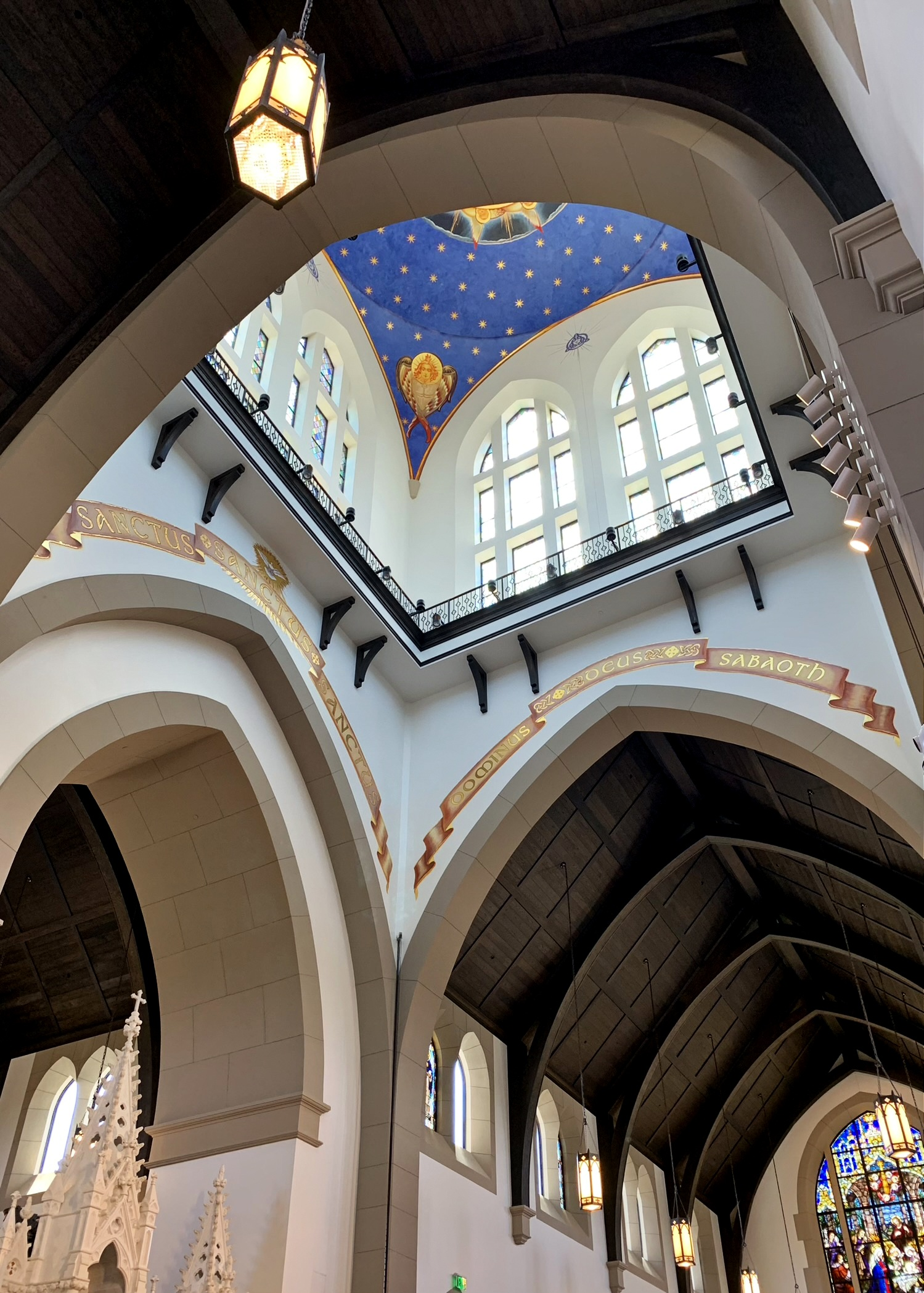
Crossing tower

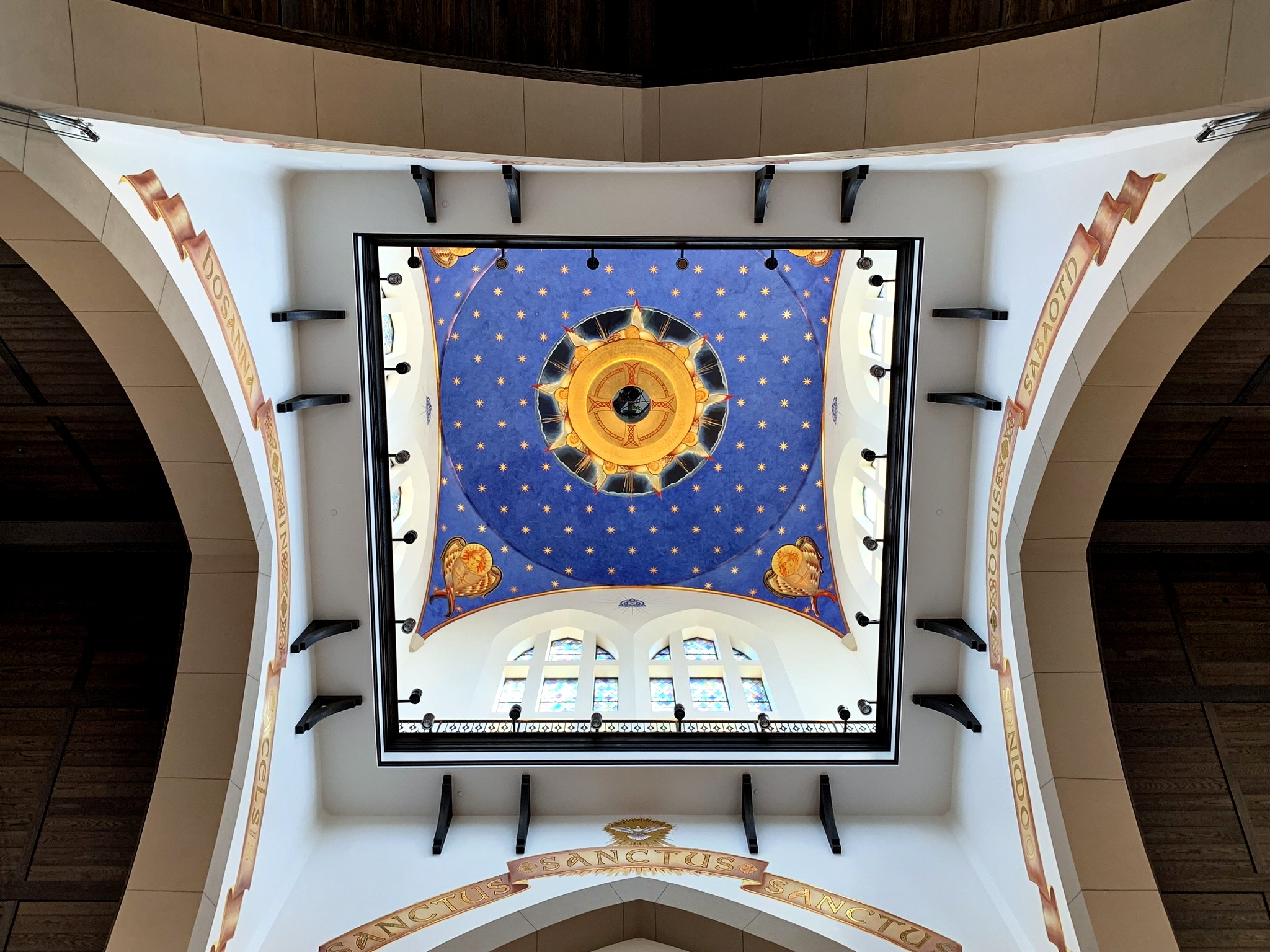
Crossing tower ceiling

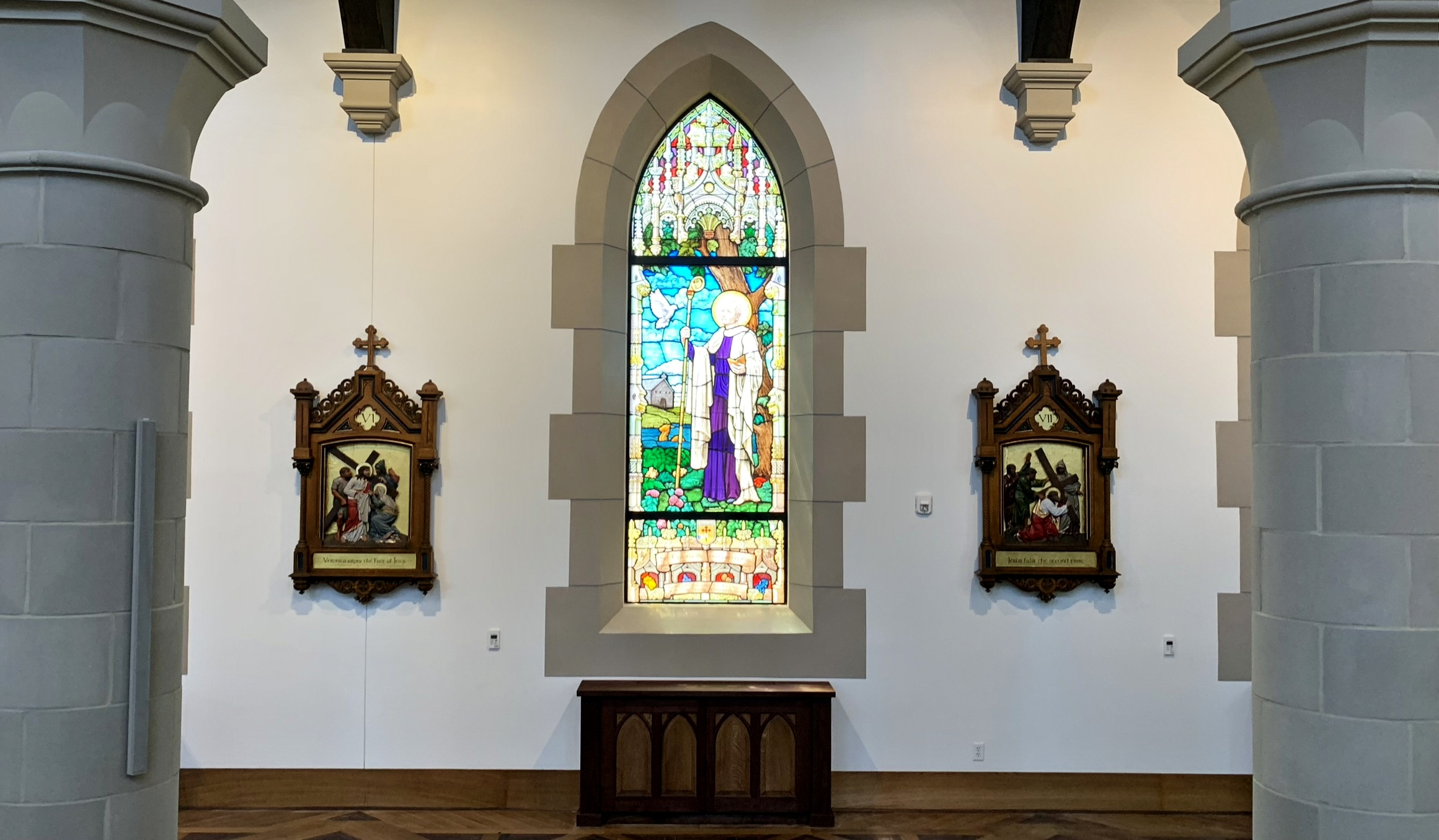
Stained-glass window

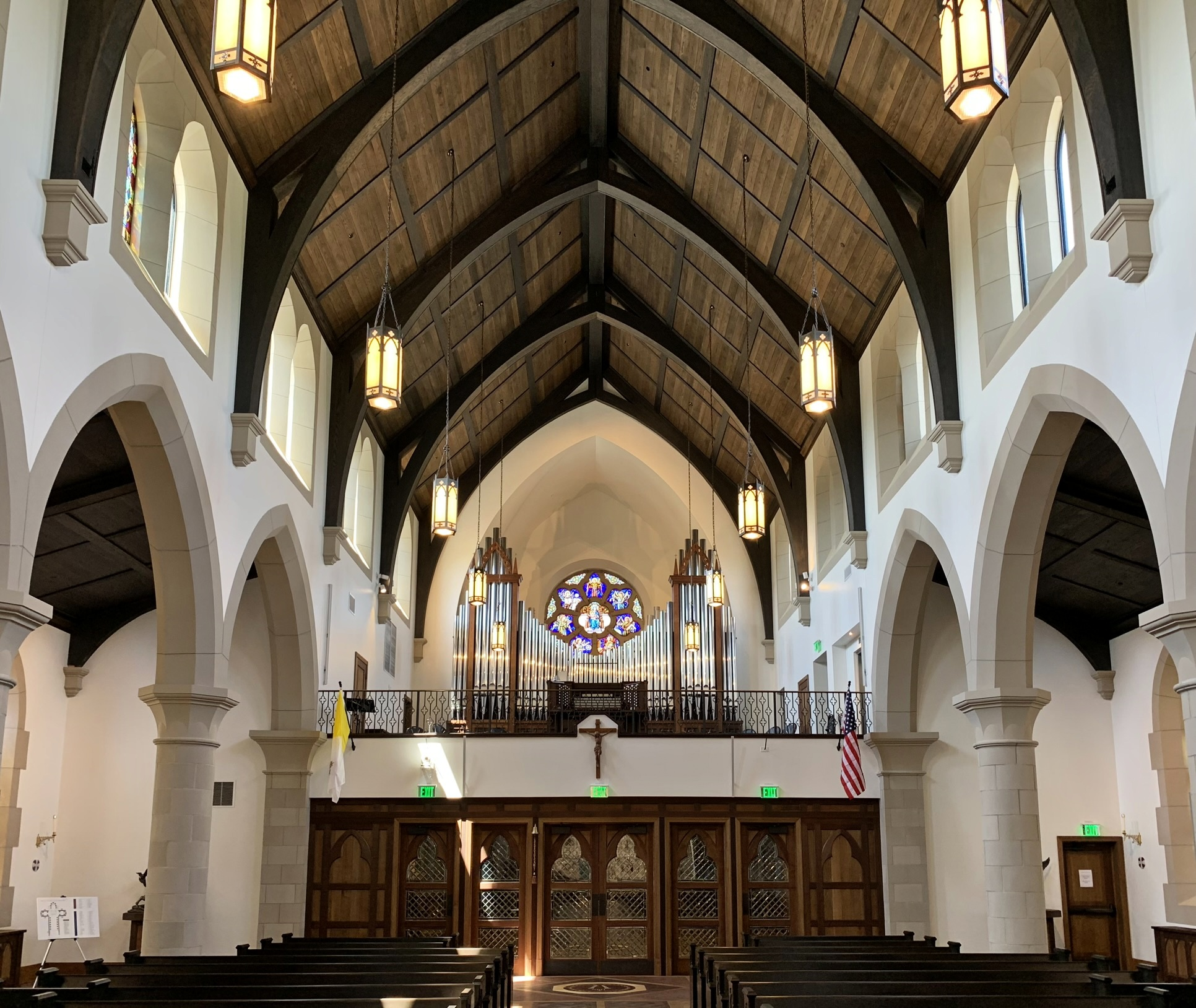
Pipe organ and balcony

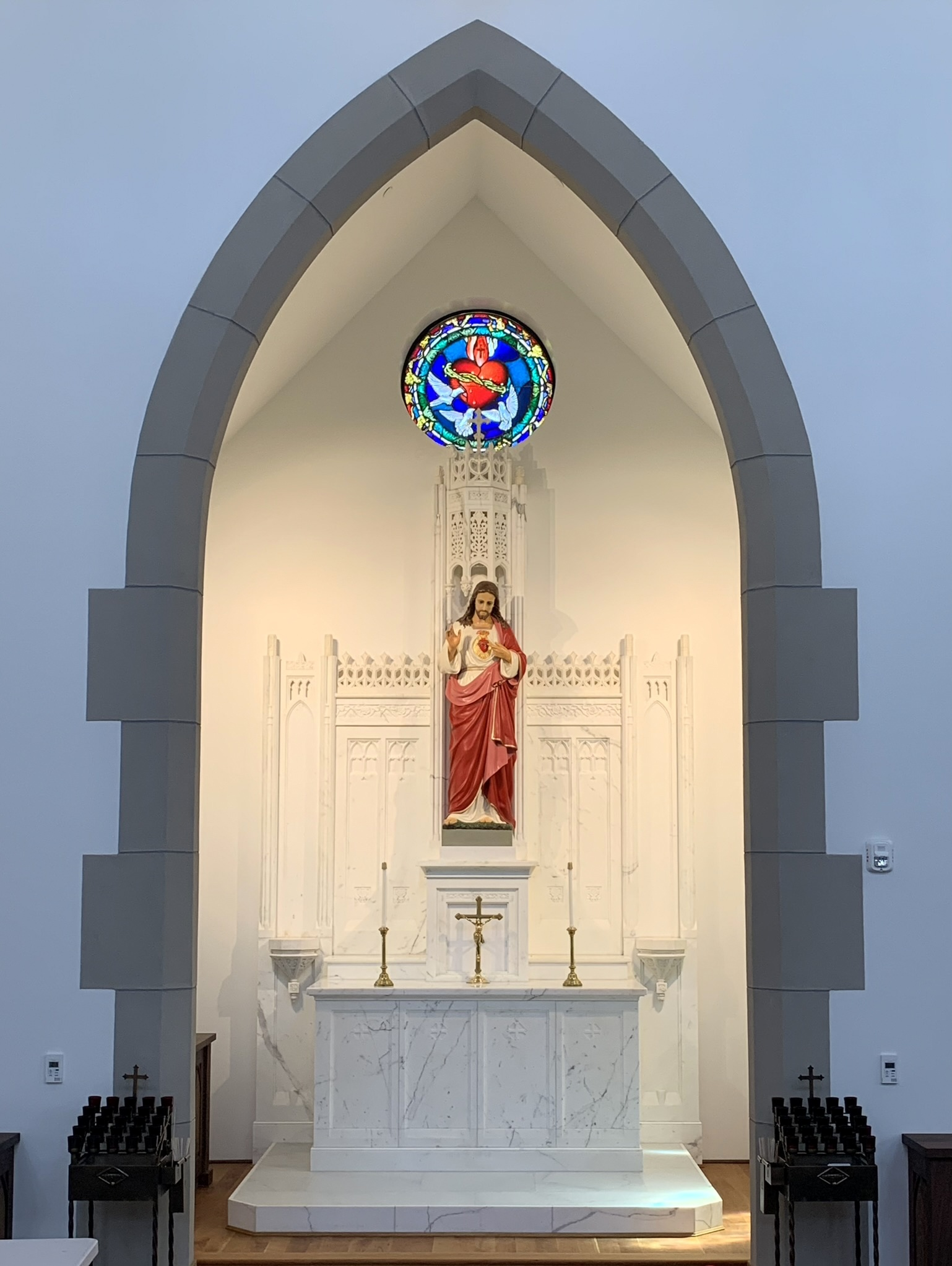
Sacred Heart Shrine
