= Christendom College =

Catholic college in Front Royal, Virginia, US

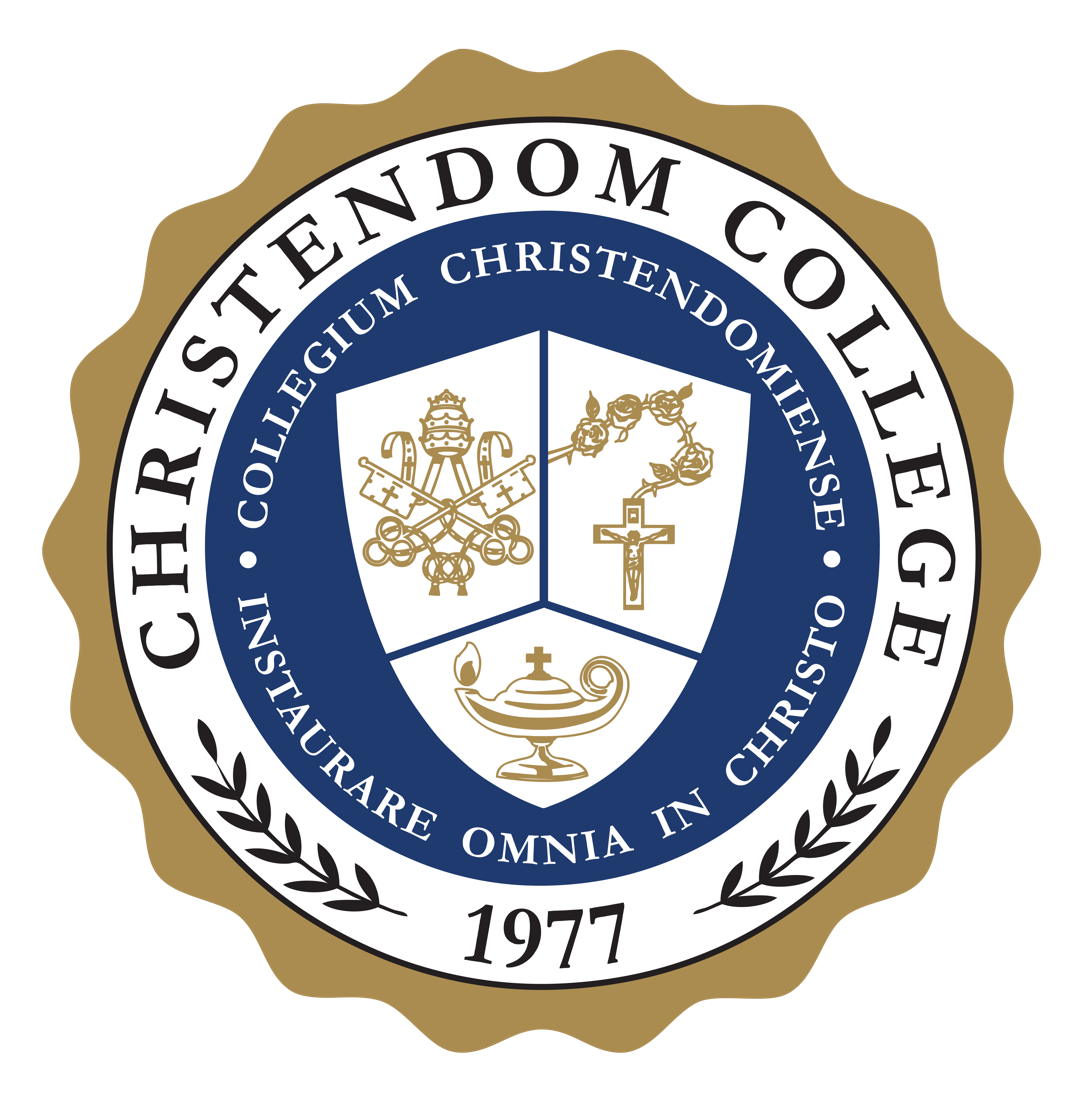
- Official seal for Christendom College
- Motto: Instaurare Omnia In Christo
- Motto in English: "To Restore All Things in Christ"
- Type: Private; lay-run Catholic
- Established: September 14, 1977; 48 years ago
- Religious affiliation: Catholic Church
- Endowment: $28 million
- President: George A. Harne
- Faculty: 44
- Administrative staff: 41
- Undergraduates: 550 (2023-24)
- Postgraduates: 100
- Location: 134 Christendom Drive, Front Royal, Virginia, US; 38°57′7″N 78°8′45.9″W
- Campus: 100 acres (0.40 km^{2})
- Founder: Warren H. Carroll
- Colors: Blue and white
- Sporting affiliations: USCAA
- Mascot: The Crusaders
- Website: www.christendom.edu

Christendom College is a private Catholic college in Front Royal, Virginia, United States. It was established in 1977.

== History ==
=== 1977—2000 ===
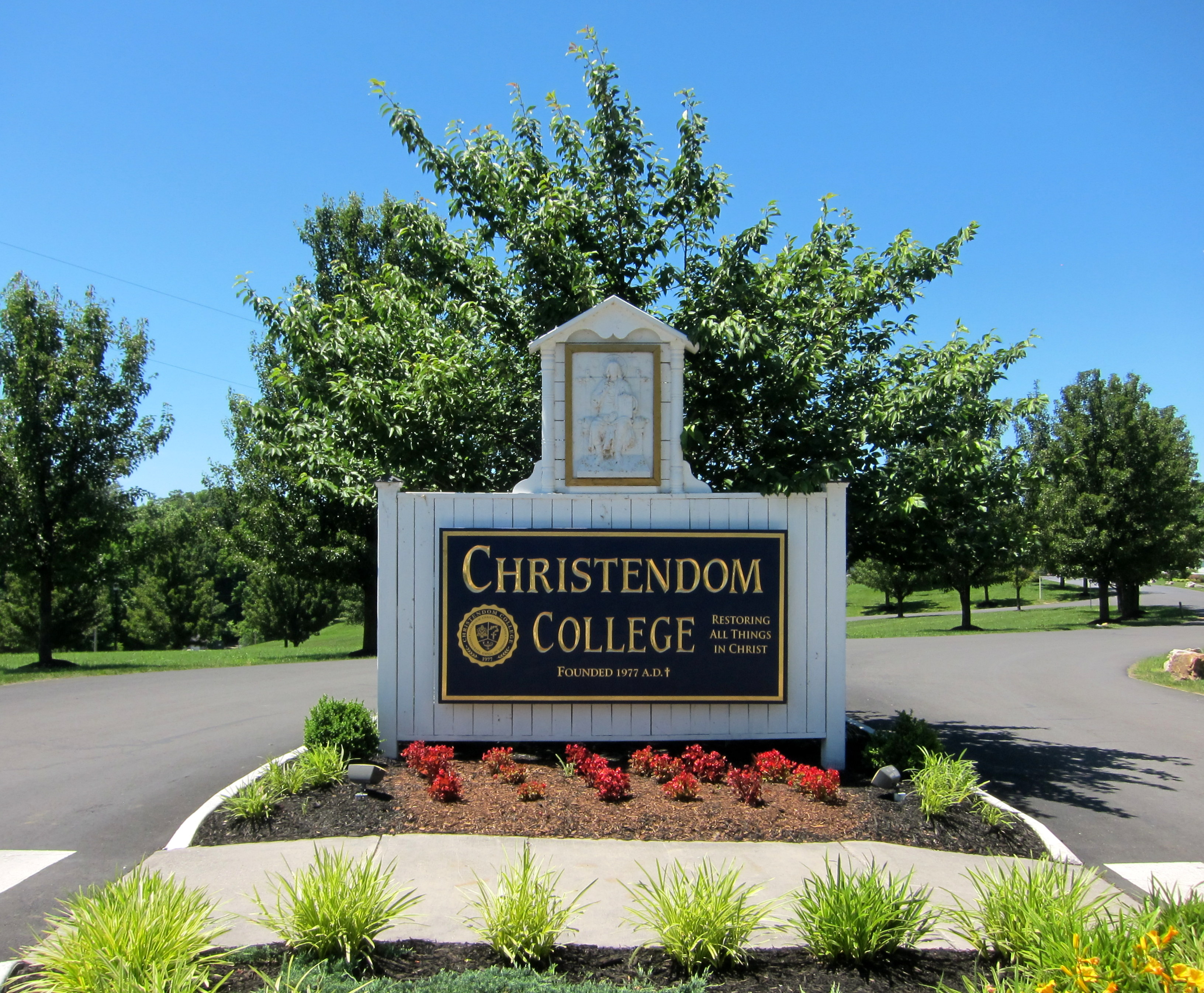
Entrance Sign

Christendom College was founded by Warren H. Carroll, a contributor at Triumph magazine. Carroll decided not to accept federal funding at the college, choosing instead to rely on benefactors. Carroll served as president until 1985 and remained chairman of the history department until his retirement in 2002.

Damian Fedoryka became the second president in 1985.

In 1992, Timothy T. O'Donnell, a professor at Christendom since 1985, became the college's third president. During his tenure, the college expanded to over 20 buildings and also acquired the Notre Dame Institute. In 1997, the Institute merged with Christendom College and became the Notre Dame Graduate School of Christendom College, now the Graduate School of Theology.

=== 2000—present ===
On January 16, 2018, Catholic blogger Simcha Fisher broke the story of three rape and sexual harassment allegations that were brought to the college administration's attention and mishandled. Timothy O'Donnell acknowledged victims in an official statement, saying, "We have failed some of our students. I am grateful to each woman who has come forward with her story. We need to hear you and your experience. Disclosing abuse and its aftermath is painful and difficult, and it takes a tremendous amount of courage. To those students who have been harmed, I am deeply sorry. We will do better." This statement has since been removed from the college website. The college has since updated the apology with a Sexual Misconduct FAQs page that outlines the steps the college takes when cases of sexual misconduct are brought to its attention.

Since the story broke, at least 18 additional allegations of sexual violence and harassment over the past 45 years have been made. In response, a group of alumni called for the school to adopt Title IX policies to better protect students in the future and also called for the resignation of O'Donnell.

By refusing to accept most forms of federal funding, Christendom College is exempt from guidelines like Title IX, is not required to comply with federal regulations on sex-based discrimination, investigations into sexual abuse, or transparency regarding on-campus crimes.

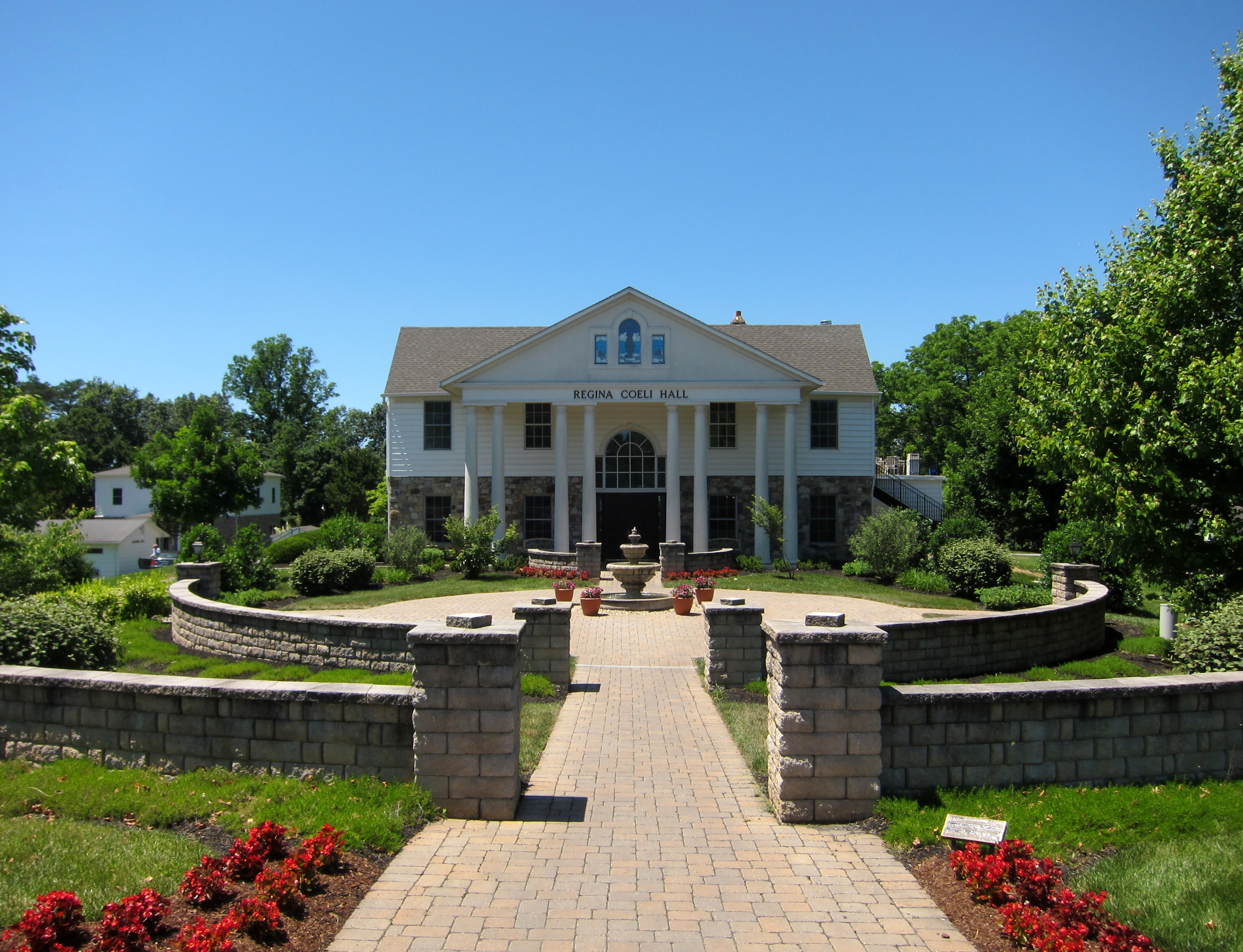
Regina Coeli Hall

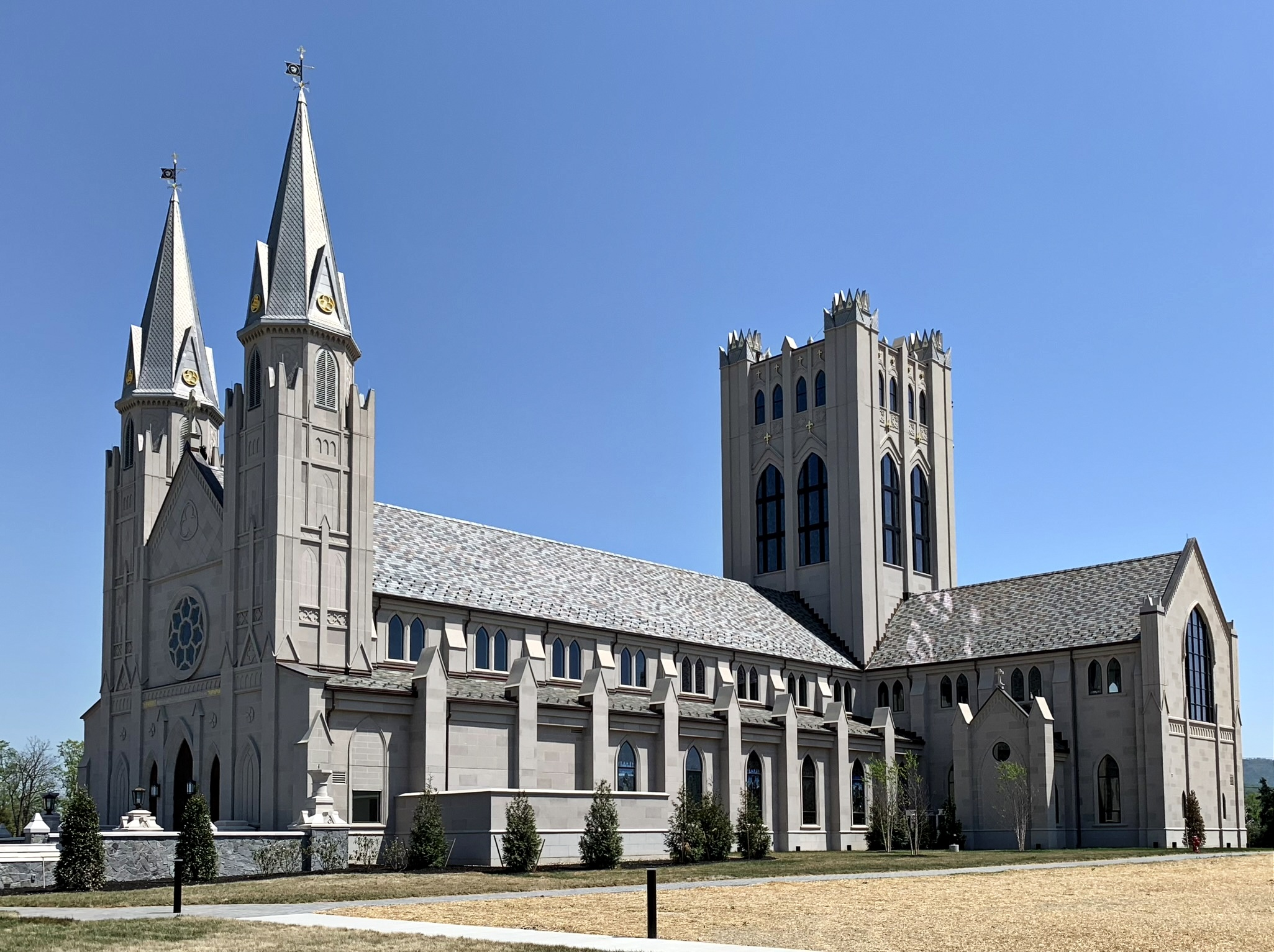
The new Christ the King Chapel was dedicated in 2023.

On May 1, 2023, Timothy O'Donnell announced his intention to retire from the college as President at the end of the 2023–24 academic year.

On July 1, 2024, George Harne became the college's fourth President.

The Department of Environmental Quality investigated the college for releasing high amounts of ammonia and sludge solids into the Shenandoah River from 2023 to 2025.

== Accreditation and admissions ==
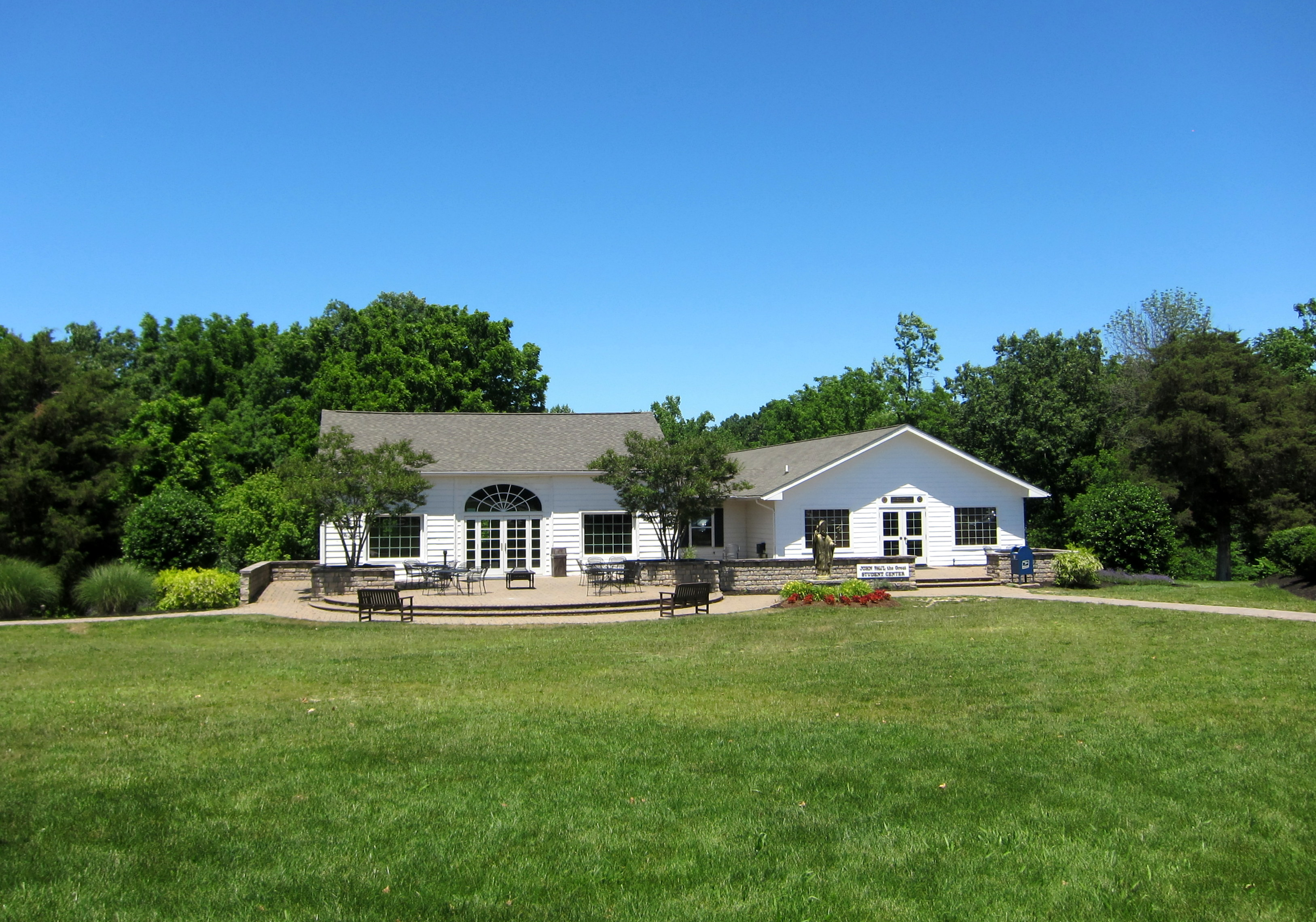
John Paul the Great Student Center

Christendom College is accredited by the Southern Association of Colleges and Schools.

Christendom College does not use the FAFSA. Instead it uses the College Board's CSS Profile to determine aid. According to their website, the typical student pays $25,000 per year to attend.

Christendom's acceptance rate is 83% with a 47% yield rate. It has a freshman retention rate of 78% and a four-year graduation rate of 70%.

== Student life ==
In 2024, Christendom enrolled 554 students from 39 states and four countries.

=== Student protests ===
Christendom College promotes its student-run pro-life group, Shield of Roses, on its web site, and students regularly protest at regional abortion clinics and other events, sometimes with the Bishop in attendance. Shield of Roses has been active since at least 2009 at major rallies, according to the school's web site. On January 23, 2012, the college shut down to send the entire student body to the 39th March for Life rally. Students protested at the Falls Church Health Care Center, where abortions are performed, in Falls Church, Virginia, in April 2017.

=== Athletics ===
Christendom's athletic teams are known as the Crusaders. The college is a member of the Eastern States Athletic Association, which is part of the United States Collegiate Athletic Association (USCAA). Christendom competes at the USCAA Division II level in basketball, soccer and women's volleyball. For sports such as baseball, cross country, and softball, the USCAA does not have separate divisions. Since the USCAA does not sponsor rugby, the men's rugby team competes in National Collegiate Rugby's Small College Division as a member of the Cardinals Collegiate Rugby Conference.

In 2017, Christendom's rugby team won the National Small College Rugby Organization (NSCRO) 7s national championship. The team defeated St. Mary's College of Maryland in overtime to capture the title, earning the school its first national championship. In 2021, the rugby team won its second rugby national championship defeating New Mexico Tech.

Christendom College women’s basketball team won its first national title in women’s basketball defeating Johnson & Wales Charlotte 76-65 in the USCAA DII National Championship game in Petersburg, Virginia, on March 13, 2024, and they continued their success by winning the title again in 2025.

== See also ==
- WXDM
- WHFW
