= WHFW =

- Winchester, Virginia; United States
- Broadcast area: Winchester, Virginia; Eastern Frederick County, Virginia; Western Clarke County, Virginia
- Frequency: 89.7 MHz
- Branding: Radio Christendom

Programming
- Format: Catholic Religious
- Affiliations: EWTN Radio

Ownership
- Owner: Christendom College; (Christendom Educational Corporation)
- Sister stations: WXDM

History
- First air date: July 22, 2013
- Call sign meaning: Holy Family Winchester (former owner)

Technical information
- Licensing authority: FCC
- Facility ID: 176296
- Class: A
- ERP: 185 watts
- HAAT: 53 meters (174 ft)
- Transmitter coordinates: 39°9′27.70″N 78°6′27.20″W

Links
- Public license information: Public file; LMS
- Webcast: Listen live (via iHeartRadio)
- Website: christendom.edu/about/radio

WHFW is a Catholic Religious formatted broadcast radio station licensed to Winchester, Virginia, serving the City of Winchester, along with Eastern Frederick County and Western Clarke County in Virginia. WHFW is owned and operated by Christendom College.

== Station sold ==
On December 2, 2014, Holy Family Communications began the process to sell WHFW to Christendom College, owner of WXDM, for $1,000. The sale of the station was closed on January 16, 2015.
