= WXDM =

- Front Royal, Virginia; United States
- Broadcast area: Northern Shenandoah Valley
- Frequency: 90.3 MHz
- Branding: Radio Christendom

Programming
- Format: Catholic Religious
- Affiliations: EWTN Radio

Ownership
- Owner: Christendom College; (Christendom Educational Corporation)
- Sister stations: WHFW

History
- First air date: January 18, 2013
- Call sign meaning: X (Christ)-endom

Technical information
- Licensing authority: FCC
- Facility ID: 171272
- Class: A
- ERP: 190 watts
- HAAT: −65.1 meters (−214 ft)
- Transmitter coordinates: 38°56′58.70″N 78°08′49.50″W

Links
- Public license information: Public file; LMS
- Webcast: Listen live (via iHeartRadio)
- Website: WXDM Online

WXDM is a Catholic Religious formatted broadcast radio station licensed to Front Royal, Virginia, serving the Northern Shenandoah Valley. WXDM is owned and operated by Christendom College.

== Station launch ==
Bishop Paul S. Loverde of the Roman Catholic Diocese of Arlington blessed the transmitter and studios of WXDM on January 18, 2013. With the Bishop's blessing, WXDM took to the airwaves as the first Catholic radio station in the Commonwealth of Virginia.

== Simulcast ==
On July 22, 2013, WXDM began simulcasting Winchester-based WHFW.
