= Seton School (Manassas, Virginia) =

- Seton School's crest, a shield divided into three parts: the Papal Keys, a rose (signifying the Virgin Mary), and the symbol of the Daughters of Charity of Saint Vincent de Paul, a branch of which was founded by the school's patron.

Location
- 9314 Maple St. Manassas, Virginia; United States; 38.7525°N 77.4663°W

Information
- Type: Private, Coeducational
- Religious affiliation: Roman Catholic
- Patron saint: Elizabeth Ann Seton
- Established: 1975
- Founder: Anne Carroll
- CEEB code: 471350
- Teaching staff: 22
- Grades: 7–12
- Enrollment: 350
- Student to teacher ratio: 16:1
- Colors: Blue and Gold
- Tuition: $7,600.00 a year
- Website: setonschool.net

Seton School is an accredited, private, co-educational Catholic junior & senior high school located in Manassas, Virginia founded in 1973 by Anne Carroll, wife of Dr. Warren Carroll. According to its website, Seton teaches orthodox, traditional Catholicism in harmony with the Magisterium of the Catholic Church and its leader, Pope Leo XIV. Its mission statement emphasizes Catholicism in the classroom as well as the importance of discipline. It was awarded a place on the Cardinal Newman Society's Catholic High School Honor Roll in 2012, and again in 2014

== About the school ==
The school has evolved considerably since its founding as the Christian Commonwealth School by Anne Carroll in 1973. In 1975, Mrs. Carroll moved the school from Warrenton to Manassas, Virginia and renamed it after St. Elizabeth Ann Seton, who was canonized the same year. In 1982, the Seton Home Study program was founded to complement the School. This program eventually separated and became its own entity, known as the Seton Home Study School. The enrollment of Seton High School passed the hundred mark in 1989. The school completed a purchase of church buildings in 1980 at the present location of the campus, allowing the school to continue its growth process. Further expansions have included the dedication of the St. Joseph's wing in 1992, the John Paul II Center which was opened in 1994 and houses the school gym, the Our Lady of the Rosary wing in 1995, and finally the Corpus Christi Center in 2006. Following the 2006 expansion, the junior high part of the school was moved into the Corpus Christi Center. Currently the school has reached its capacity enrollment of approximately 350.

Seton School requires its students to complete a rigorous course of studies designed to prepare its students to succeed in challenging college coursework. Included in this curriculum are several college level courses that, while not official AP courses, consistently enable the students to score 3 or higher on AP exams in the subject areas of Calculus, Economics, English Language, English Literature, Physics, Statistics, and United States Government. For 2010 through 2012 scores of 3 or greater were obtained on 67% of all AP exams taken.

Due to its commitment to Catholic identity, Seton School was awarded a spot on Cardinal Newman Society's Catholic High School Honor Roll in 2012. According to the Society, this list of 50 Catholic high schools in the United States honors schools that have "overall excellence in Catholic identity, academics and civics education". Seton High School was one of three schools in Virginia to receive this honor. The other two schools were Pope Paul VI High School in Fairfax and Pope John Paul the Great Catholic High School in Dumfries. It was placed on the list again in 2014. Four other Virginia schools received this honor: Paul VI Catholic High School, Pope John Paul the Great Catholic High School, Holy Family Academy and Bishop O'Connell High School.

In 2012, a teacher was charged with attempted indecent liberties with a 15-year-old male student.

== Sports accolades ==
- Boys Baseball: VIS Div II Quarterfinalist 2008, 2009
- Boys Basketball: VIS Div. II Quarterfinalist 2010
- Girls Basketball: VIS Div. II State Champs 2003–2004; Quarterfinalist 2007–2008, 2008–2009; Semifinalist 2016; Runner-Up 2017
- Boys Lacrosse: VIS Div. II State Champs 2007; Semifinalist 2008, 2009, 2011; Quarterfinalist 2010
- Boys Soccer: VIS Div. II State Champs 2004, 2005, 2006; Semifinalist 2007; Runner-Up 2008, 2012
- Girls Soccer: VIS Div. II Semifinalist 2006, 2009, 2016; Quarterfinalist 2010, 2011, 2013–2015; State Champs 2017
- Boys Swimming: VIS Div. II State Champs 2005–2006, 2008–2011; Runner-Up 2006–2007, 2007–2008
- Girls Swimming: VIS Div. II State Champs 2007–2011; Runner-Up 2005–2006, 2012, 2015
- Boys Tennis: VIS Div. II Semifinalist 2009–2010
- Girls Volleyball: VIS Div. II Semifinalist 2008; Quarterfinalist 2007, 2010
- Girls Softball: VIS Div. II Quarterfinalist 2011

== Student awards and honors ==
Award	First place	Second place	Third place
Alex and Geline Williams Pro-life Oratory Contest	2005, 2008, 2015, 2016, 2017, 2018	2009, 2011, 2012, 2016, 2017, 2018	2013, 2016, 2017, 2018
Sea Perch Virginia State Competition	2009, 2018 (Maneuverability, Recovery, Collaboration), 2010 (Maneuverability, Recovery, Relay)	2009 (Recovery, Relay), 2010 (Maneuverability, Collaboration, Relay)	2009 (Relay), 2010 (Maneuverability, Recovery, Collaboration)
National Latin Examination	Gold Medal: 1987–2019		
Intel International Science and Engineering Fair	Finalists: 2001, 2002, 2004, 2009, 2018		
Virginia State Science and Engineering Fair	Category Winners 2002, 2008, 2010, 2011		
Prince William-Manassas Regional Science Fair	2001, 2002, 2004, 2009, 2018		
CAPPIES Theatre Award	2006 (Best Costumes, Leading Actress in a Musical – Annie Get Your Gun)		
VEX Robotics Virginia State Championship	2014, 2015		
Virginia Governor's School	2001–2005, 2007–2012		
Newman Society Catholic High School Honor Roll	2012, 2014		
