= Timothy T. O'Donnell =

American theologian

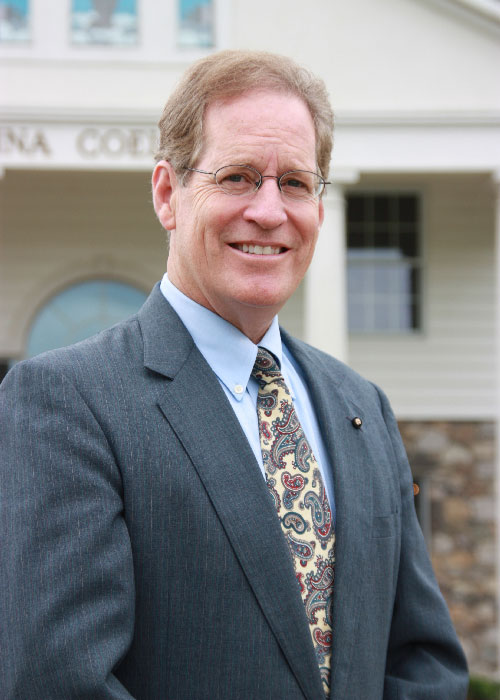
Christendom College President Dr. Timothy O'Donnell

Timothy Terrance O'Donnell is an academic and Catholic theologian and the former president of Christendom College, located in Front Royal, Virginia. He stepped down from his position as president after the completion of the 2023–2024 academic year, having served as the college's third president for 32 years.

== Biography ==
O'Donnell received a Doctorate in Sacred Theology at the Pontifical University of Saint Thomas Aquinas, Angelicum in Rome, Italy, in 1981 with a dissertation entitled A study in the relationship between doctrine and spirituality : the contemporary and perennial value of devotion to the Sacred Heart of Jesus. He is the first layman to receive a licentiate and a doctorate in Ascetical and Mystical Theology from the Angelicum.

He has taught at several colleges, particularly St. John's Seminary in Camarillo, California, and Loyola Marymount University in Los Angeles, California. At Christendom, he teaches courses in History and Theology, such as The History of the Papacy, The History of Ireland, and Ascetical and Mystical Theology.

He is an advisor to the Pontifical Council for the Family, appointed to that position by Pope John Paul II in 2002. He is also a Knight Grand Cross of the Equestrian Order of the Holy Sepulchre of Jerusalem.

On May 31, 2007, O'Donnell was awarded the Distinguished Service Award from the Brent Society for outstanding contributions to Catholic education.

On November 22, 2003, O'Donnell received the "Christ the King Award" from The Christian Law Institute, awarded to O'Donnell, according to Christendom College's press release concerning the award, "in recognition of his outstanding contributions to the cause of Christianization of civil society in America; his distinguished leadership of many years in Catholic higher education; his promotion in his books, articles, and lectures of Catholic apologetics, history and spirituality; his devotion to and work for the Catholic family; and his own family of nine children, all the while remaining faithful to Jesus Christ, His Church, and His Revelation."

O'Donnell and his wife, Cathy, have nine children and live in Stephens City, Virginia.

O'Donnell, his wife, and three of his wife's sisters starred in a 1979 episode of Family Feud.

== Published works ==
=== Books ===
- O'Donnell, Timothy, Swords Around the Cross: The Nine Years War: Ireland's Defense of Faith and Fatherland, 1594-1603, Christendom Press, 2001, ISBN 978-0-931888-78-6
- O'Donnell, Timothy, Heart of the Redeemer: An Apologia for the Contemporary and Perennial Value of the Devotion to the Sacred Heart of Jesus, Ignatius Press, 1992, ISBN 978-0-89870-396-2

=== Lecture series for EWTN ===
- "The Heart of Jesus"
- "The Glory of the Papacy"
- "Saint Luke: Meek Scribe of Christ"
- "Rome's Hidden Churches: A Lenten Pilgrimage"
- "Signs & Glory: The Gospel of Saint John"
- "Saint Matthew: Evangelist of the Church"
- "The Gospel of Mark: The Memoirs of Saint Peter"
